= Komano Station =

Railway station in Kaizu, Gifu Prefecture, Japan

Komano Station 駒野駅
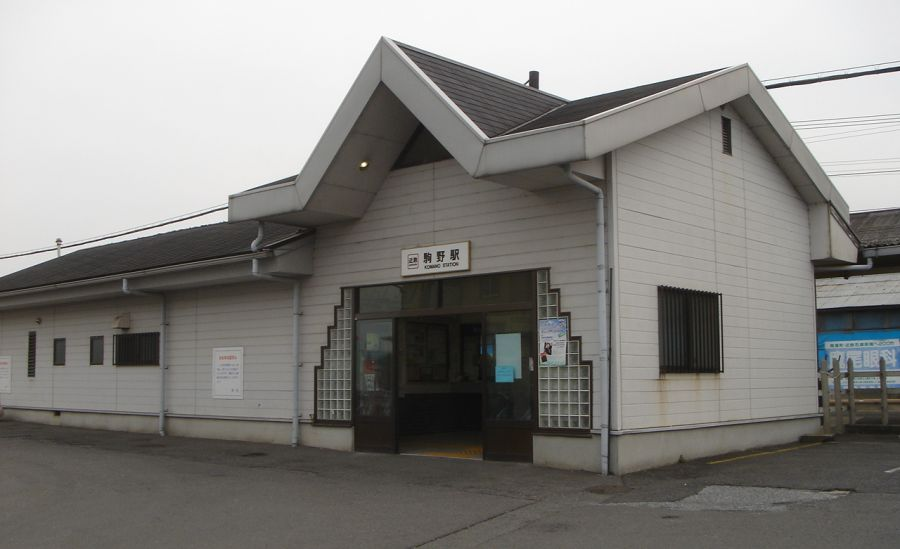
- Komano Station in November 2005

General information
- Location: Nanno-cho Komano, Kaizu-shi, Gifu-ken 503-0411; Japan
- Coordinates: 35.223691°N 136.603594°E
- Operator: Yōrō Railway
- Line: ■ Yōrō Line
- Distance: 19.8 km from Kuwana
- Platforms: 1 side + 1 island platform
- Tracks: 3

Other information
- Status: Staffed
- Website: Official website (in Japanese)

History
- Opened: April 27, 1919

Passengers
- FY2015: 880
Location
- Location within Japan

Komano Station (駒野駅, Komano-eki) is a railway station in the city of Kaizu, Gifu Prefecture, Japan, operated by the private railway operator Yōrō Railway.

== Lines ==
Komano Station is a station on the Yōrō Line, and is located 19.8 rail kilometers from the opposing terminus of the line at Kuwana.

== Station layout ==
Komano Station has one ground-level side platform and one ground-level island platform connected by a level crossing. The station is staffed.

=== Platforms ===
1 / 3	■ Yōrō Line	for Ibi and Ōgaki
2	■ Yōrō Line	for Kuwana

== Adjacent stations ==
«	Service	»
Yōrō Railway
Yōrō Line
Mino-Yamazaki	-	Mino-Tsuya

== History ==
Komano Station opened on April 27, 1919.

== Passenger statistics ==
In fiscal 2015, the station was used by an average of 880 passengers daily (boarding passengers only).

== Surrounding area ==
- Shioryama Junior High School
- National Route 258

== See also ==
- List of railway stations in Japan
