= Mino-Matsuyama Station =

Railway station in Kaizu, Gifu Prefecture, Japan

Mino-Matsuyama Station 美濃松山駅
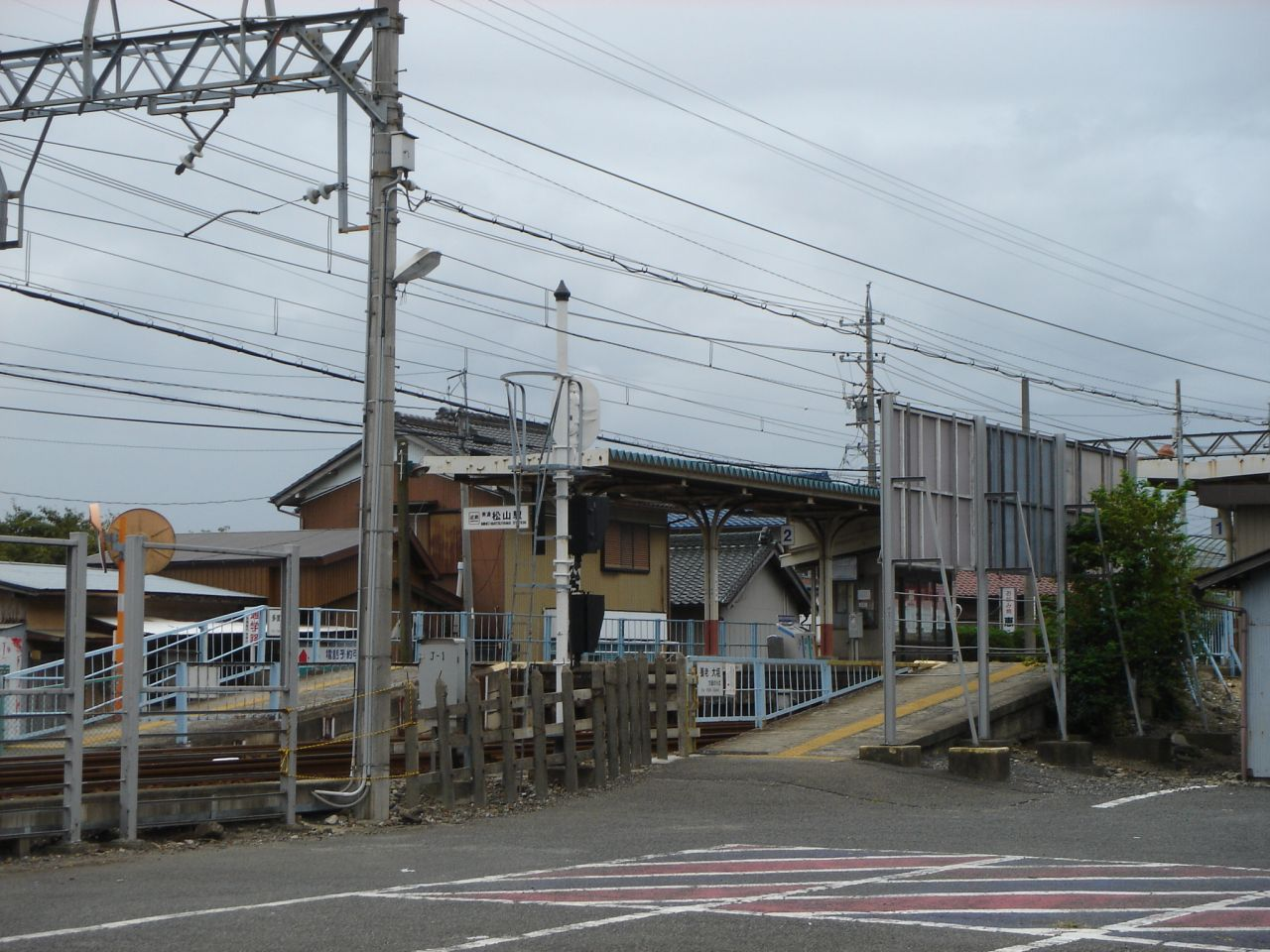
- Mino-Matsuyama Station in September 2007

General information
- Location: Nanno-cho Matsuyama, Kaizu-shi, Gifu-ken 503-0535; Japan
- Coordinates: 35.1606°N 136.6332°E
- Operator: Yōrō Railway
- Line: ■ Yōrō Line
- Distance: 11.9 km from Kuwana
- Platforms: 2 side platforms
- Tracks: 2

Other information
- Status: Unstaffed
- Website: Official website (in Japanese)

History
- Opened: February 24, 1929

Passengers
- FY2015: 763
Location
- Location within Japan

Mino-Matsuyama Station (美濃松山駅, Mino-Matsuyama-eki) is a railway station in the city of Kaizu, Gifu Prefecture, Japan, operated by the private railway operator Yōrō Railway.

== Lines ==
Mino-Matsuyama Station is a station on the Yōrō Line, and is located 11.9 rail kilometers from the opposing terminus of the line at Kuwana.

== Station layout ==
Mino-Matsuyama Station has two opposed ground-level side platforms connected by a level crossing. The station is unattended.

=== Platforms ===
1	■ Yōrō Line	for Ibi and Ōgaki
2	■ Yōrō Line	for Kuwana

== Adjacent stations ==
«	Service	»
Yōrō Railway
Yōrō Line
Tado	-	Ishizu

== History ==
Mino-Matsuyama Station opened on February 24, 1929.

== Passenger statistics ==
In fiscal 2015, the station was used by an average of 763 passengers daily (boarding passengers only).

== Surrounding area ==
- National Route 258

== See also ==
- List of railway stations in Japan
