= Higashi-Akasaka Station =

Railway station in Gōdo, Gifu Prefecture, Japan

Higashi-Akasaka Station 東赤坂駅
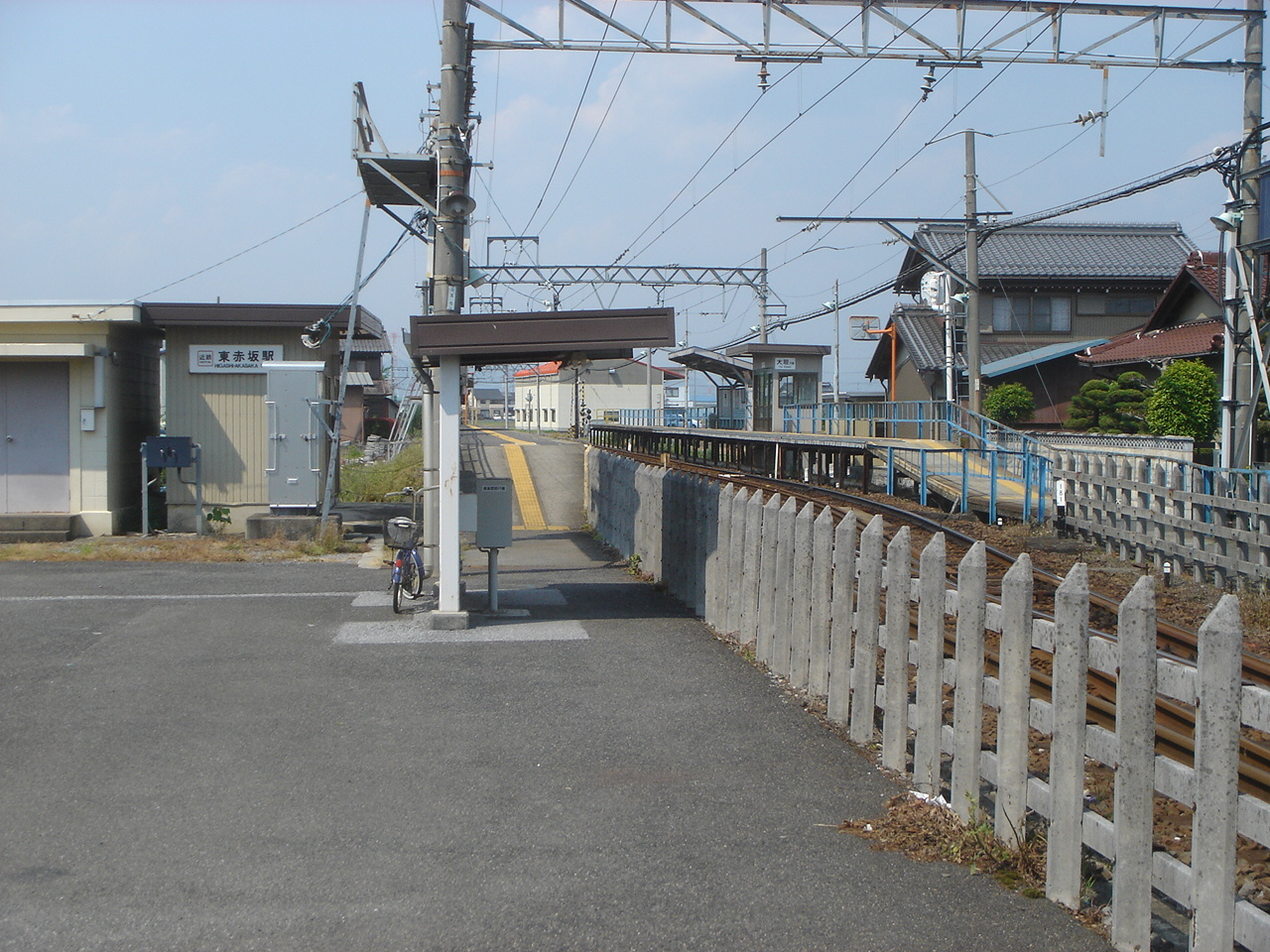
- Higashi-Akasaka Station in May 2007

General information
- Location: Kita-Isshiki, Gōdo-chō, Anpachi-gun, Gifu-ken 503-2306; Japan
- Coordinates: 35.3941°N 136.6010°E
- Operator: Yōrō Railway
- Line: ■ Yōrō Line
- Distance: 47.5 km from Kuwana
- Platforms: 2 side platforms
- Tracks: 2

Other information
- Status: Unstaffed
- Website: Official website (in Japanese)

History
- Opened: January 1, 1914

Passengers
- FY2015: 398
Location
- Location within Japan

Higashi-Akasaka Station (東赤坂駅, Higashi-Akasaka-eki) is a railway station in the town of Gōdo, Anpachi District, Gifu Prefecture Japan, operated by the private railway operator Yōrō Railway.

== Lines ==
Higashi-Akasaka Station is a station on the Yōrō Line, and is located 47.5 rail kilometers from the opposing terminus of the line at Kuwana.

== Station layout ==
Higashi-Akasaka Station has two opposed ground-level side platforms connected by a level crossing. The station is unattended.

=== Platforms ===
| station side | ■ Yōrō Line | for Ibi |
| opp side | ■ Yōrō Line | for Ōgaki, Yōrō and Kuwana |

== Adjacent stations ==
| « | Service | » |
Yōrō Railway
Yōrō Line
| Kita-Ōgaki | - | Hiro-Gōdo |

== History ==
Higashi-Akasaka Station opened on January 1, 1914.

== Passenger statistics ==
In fiscal 2015, the station was used by an average of 398 passengers daily (boarding passengers only).

== Surrounding area ==
- Ogaki Women's College
- National Route 417

== See also ==
- List of railway stations in Japan
