= Mino-Yamazaki Station =

Railway station in Kaizu, Gifu Prefecture, Japan

Mino-Yamazaki Station 美濃山崎駅
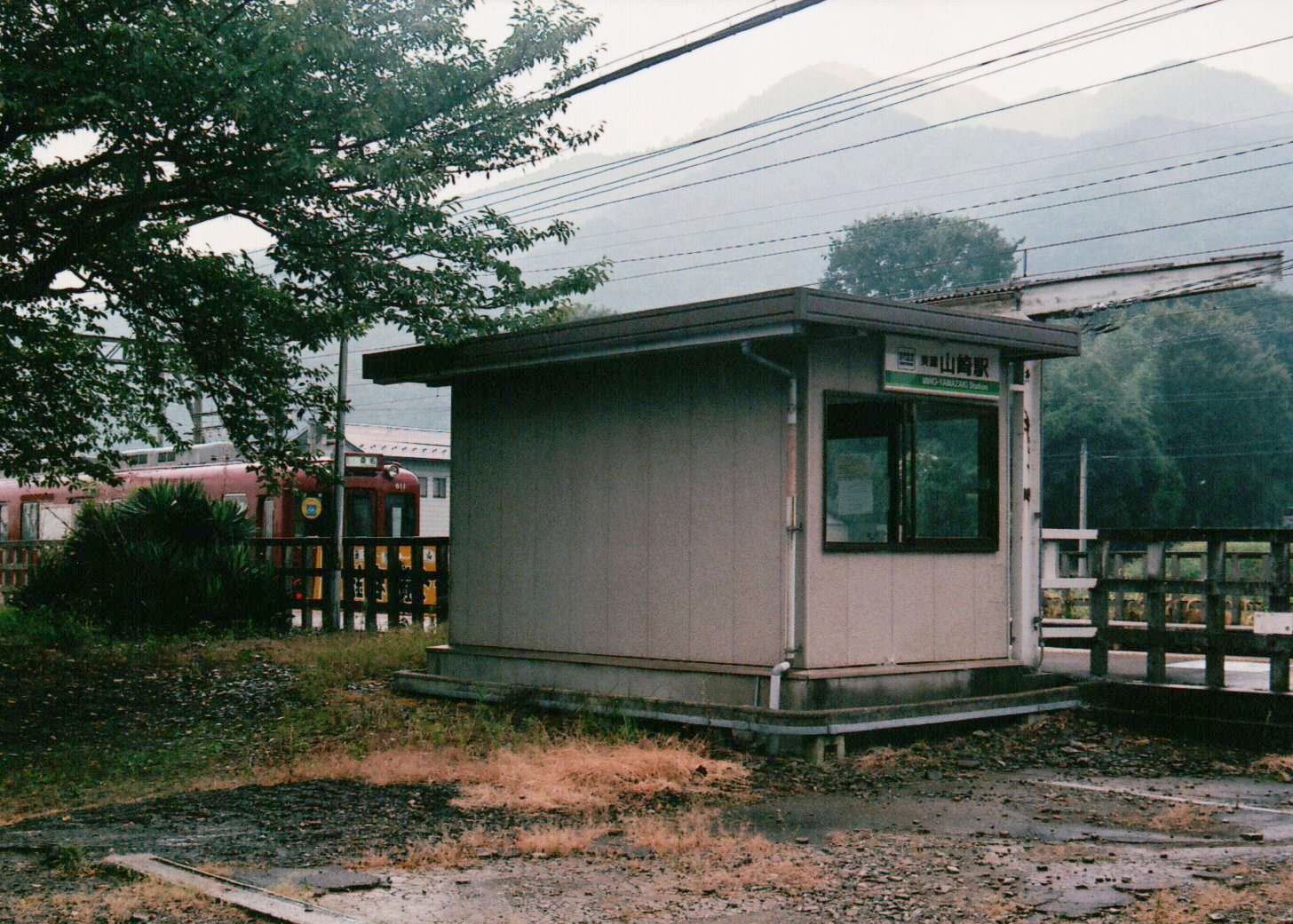
- Mino-Yamazaki Station in October 2011

General information
- Location: Nanno-cho Yamazaki, Kaizu-shi, Gifu-ken 503-0415; Japan
- Coordinates: 35.1986°N 136.6215°E
- Operator: Yōrō Railway
- Line: ■ Yōrō Line
- Distance: 16.2 km from Kuwana
- Platforms: 2 side platforms
- Tracks: 2

Other information
- Status: Unstaffed
- Website: Official website (in Japanese)

History
- Opened: April 27, 1919

Passengers
- FY2015: 141
Location
- Location within Japan

Mino-Yamazaki Station (美濃山崎駅, Mino-Yamazaki-eki; 美濃高田駅) Mino-Takada-eki is a railway station in the city of Kaizu, Gifu Prefecture, Japan, operated by the private railway operator Yōrō Railway.

== Lines ==
Mino-Yamazakia Station is a station on the Yōrō Line, and is located 16.2 rail kilometers from the opposing terminus of the line at Kuwana.

== Station layout ==
Mino-Yamazaki Station has two opposed ground-level side platforms connected by a level crossing. The station is unattended.

=== Platforms ===
west	■ Yōrō Line	for Ibi and Ōgaki
east	■ Yōrō Line	for Kuwana

== Adjacent stations ==
«	Service	»
Yōrō Railway
Yōrō Line
Ishizu	-	Komano

== History ==
Mino-Yamazaki Station opened on April 27, 1919.

== Passenger statistics ==
In fiscal 2015, the station was used by an average of 141 passengers daily (boarding passengers only).

== Surrounding area ==
- Ibi River
- National Route 258

== See also ==
- List of railway stations in Japan
