= Nishi-Ōgaki Station =

Railway station in Ōgaki, Gifu Prefecture, Japan

Nishi-Ōgaki Station 西大垣駅
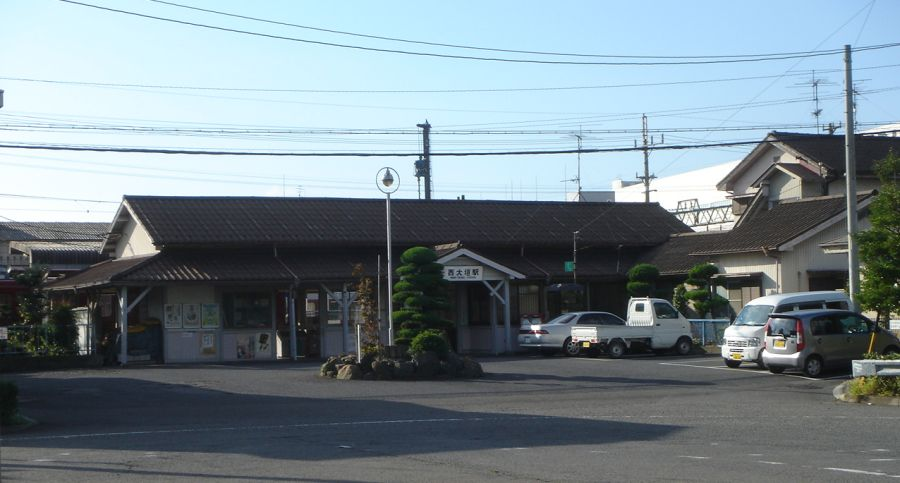
- Nishi-Ōgaki Station in November 2005

General information
- Location: 910 Kido-cho, Ōgaki-shi, Gifu-ken 503-0973; Japan
- Coordinates: 35.3603°N 136.6036°E
- Operator: Yōrō Railway
- Line: ■ Yōrō Line
- Distance: 41.2 km from Kuwana
- Platforms: 2 side platforms
- Tracks: 2

Other information
- Status: Staffed
- Website: Official website (in Japanese)

History
- Opened: July 31, 1913

Passengers
- FY2015: 334
Location
- Location within Gifu Prefecture Location within Japan

Nishi-Ōgaki Station (西大垣駅, Nishi-Ōgaki-eki) is a railway station in the city of Ōgaki, Gifu Prefecture Japan, operated by the private railway operator Yōrō Railway.

== Lines ==
Nishi-Ōgaki Station is a station on the Yōrō Line, and is located 41.2 rail kilometers from the opposing terminus of the line at Kuwana.

== Station layout ==
Nishi-Ōgaki Station has two ground-level side platforms connected by a level crossing. The station is staffed.

=== Platforms ===
opp side	■ Yōrō Line	for Ōgaki, Ibi
station side	■ Yōrō Line	for Ōgaki, and Ibi; Yōrō and Kuwana

== Adjacent stations ==
«	Service	»
Yōrō Railway
Yōrō Line
Mino-Yanagi	-	Ōgaki

== History ==
Nishi-Ōgaki Station opened on July 31, 1913.

== Passenger statistics ==
In fiscal 2015, the station was used by an average of 334 passengers daily (boarding passengers only).

== Surrounding area ==
- Nippon Synthetic Chemical Industry Co., Ltd. Ogaki plant

== See also ==
- List of railway stations in Japan
