= Shimo-Noshiro Station =

Railway station in Kuwana, Mie Prefecture, Japan

Shimo-Noshiro Station 下野代駅
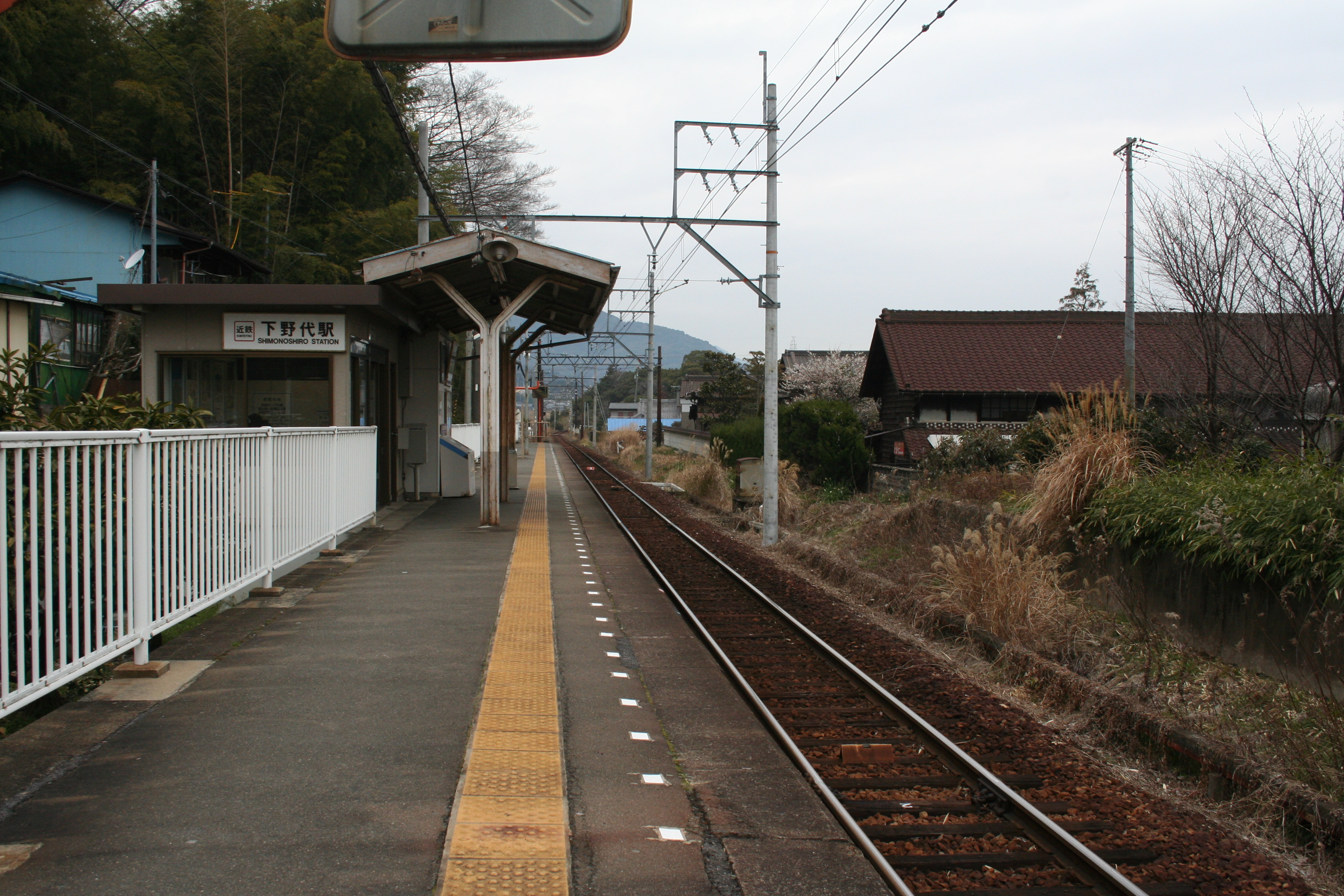
- Shimo-Noshiro Station

General information
- Location: 3162-3 Shimo-Noshiro, Kuwana-shi, Mie-ken 511-0117; Japan
- Coordinates: 35.1159°N 136.6473°E
- Operator: Yōrō Railway
- Line: ■ Yōrō Line
- Distance: 6.6 km from Kuwana
- Platforms: 1 side platform

Other information
- Status: Staffed
- Website: Official website (in Japanese)

History
- Opened: June 1, 1920

Passengers
- FY2019: 170
Location
- Location within Mie Prefecture Location within Japan

Shimo-Noshiro Station (下野代駅, Shimo-Noshiro-eki) is a passenger railway station located in the city of Kuwana, Mie Prefecture, Japan, operated by the private railway operator Yōrō Railway.

== Lines ==
Shimo-Noshiro Station is a station on the Yōrō Line, and is located 6.6 rail kilometers from the terminus of the line at Kuwana.

== Station layout ==
The station consists of one side platform serving bi-directional traffic. The station is unattended.

=== Platforms ===
1	■ Yōrō Line	For Yōrō, Ōgaki; For Kuwana

== Adjacent stations ==
«	Service	»
Yōrō Railway
Yōrō Line
Shimo-Fukaya	-	Tado

== History ==
Shimo-Noshiro Station opened on June 1, 1920 as a station on the Yōrō Railway. The Yōrō Railway became the Ise Electric Railway’s Yōrō Line on October 1, 1929, but re-emerged as the Yōrō Railway on April 20, 1936. It merged with the Sangu Electric Railway on August 1, 1940, and through a series of mergers became part of the Kansai Express Railway on June 1, 1944. The line was split off into the new Yōrō Railway on October 1, 2007.

== Passenger statistics ==
In fiscal 2019, the station was used by an average of 170 passengers daily (boarding passengers only).

== Surrounding area ==
- Kuwana City Tadohigashi Elementary School

== See also ==
- List of railway stations in Japan
