= Mino-Tsuya Station =

Railway station in Kaizu, Gifu Prefecture, Japan

Mino-Tsuya Station 美濃津屋駅
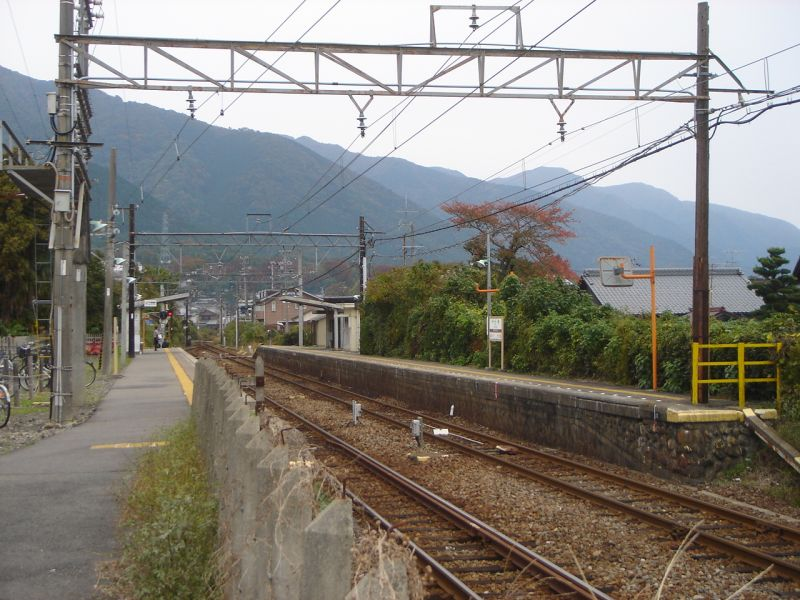
- Mino-Tsuya Station in November 2005

General information
- Location: Nanno-cho Tsuya, Kaizu-shi, Gifu-ken 503-0401; Japan
- Coordinates: 35.2516°N 136.5669°E
- Operator: Yōrō Railway
- Line: ■ Yōrō Line
- Distance: 24.5 km from Kuwana
- Platforms: 2 side platforms
- Tracks: 2

Other information
- Status: Unstaffed
- Website: Official website (in Japanese)

History
- Opened: April 27, 1919

Passengers
- FY2015: 325
Location
- Location within Japan

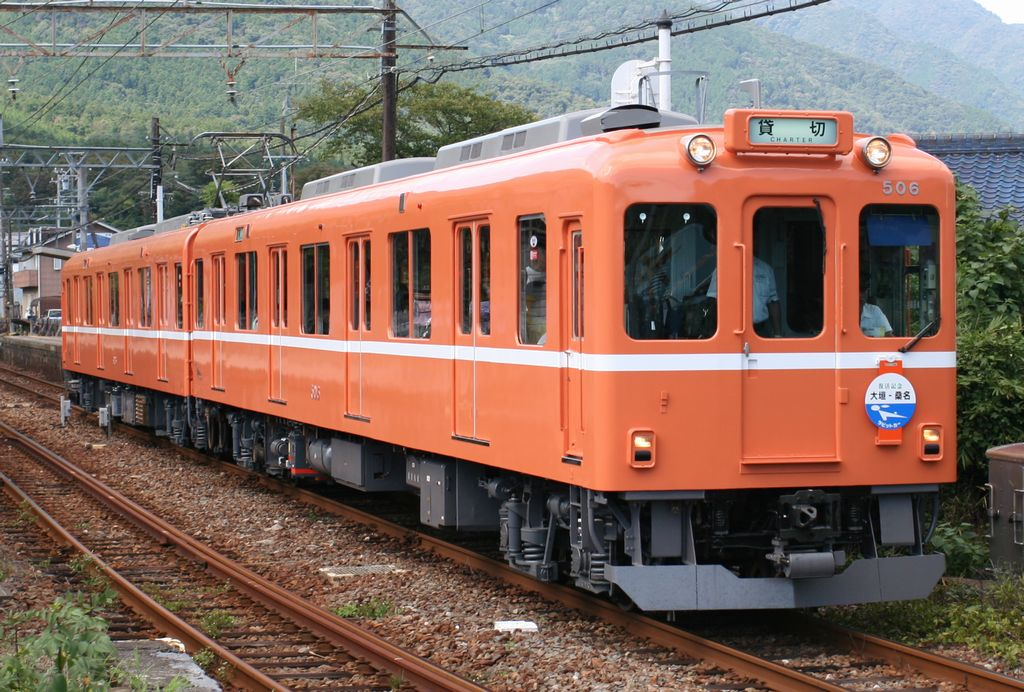
Yōrō Railway 606F at Mino-Tsuya Station

Mino-Takada Station (美濃高田駅, Mino-Takada-eki) is a railway station in the city of Kaizu, Gifu Prefecture, Japan, operated by the private railway operator Yōrō Railway.

== Lines ==
Mino-Tsuya Station is a station on the Yōrō Line, and is located 24.5 rail kilometers from the opposing terminus of the line at Kuwana.

== Station layout ==
Mino-Tsuya Station has two opposed ground-level side platforms connected by a level crossing. The station is unattended.

=== Platforms ===
west	■ Yōrō Line	for Ibi and Ōgaki
east	■ Yōrō Line	for Kuwana

== Adjacent stations ==
«	Service	»
Yōrō Railway
Yōrō Line
Komano	-	Yōrō

== History ==
Mino-Tsuya Station opened on April 27, 1919.

== Passenger statistics ==
In fiscal 2015, the station was used by an average of 325 passengers daily (boarding passengers only).

== Surrounding area ==
- Yōnan Junior High School

== See also ==
- List of railway stations in Japan
