= Shimo-Fukaya Station =

Railway station in Kuwana, Mie Prefecture, Japan

Shimo-Fukaya Station 下深谷駅
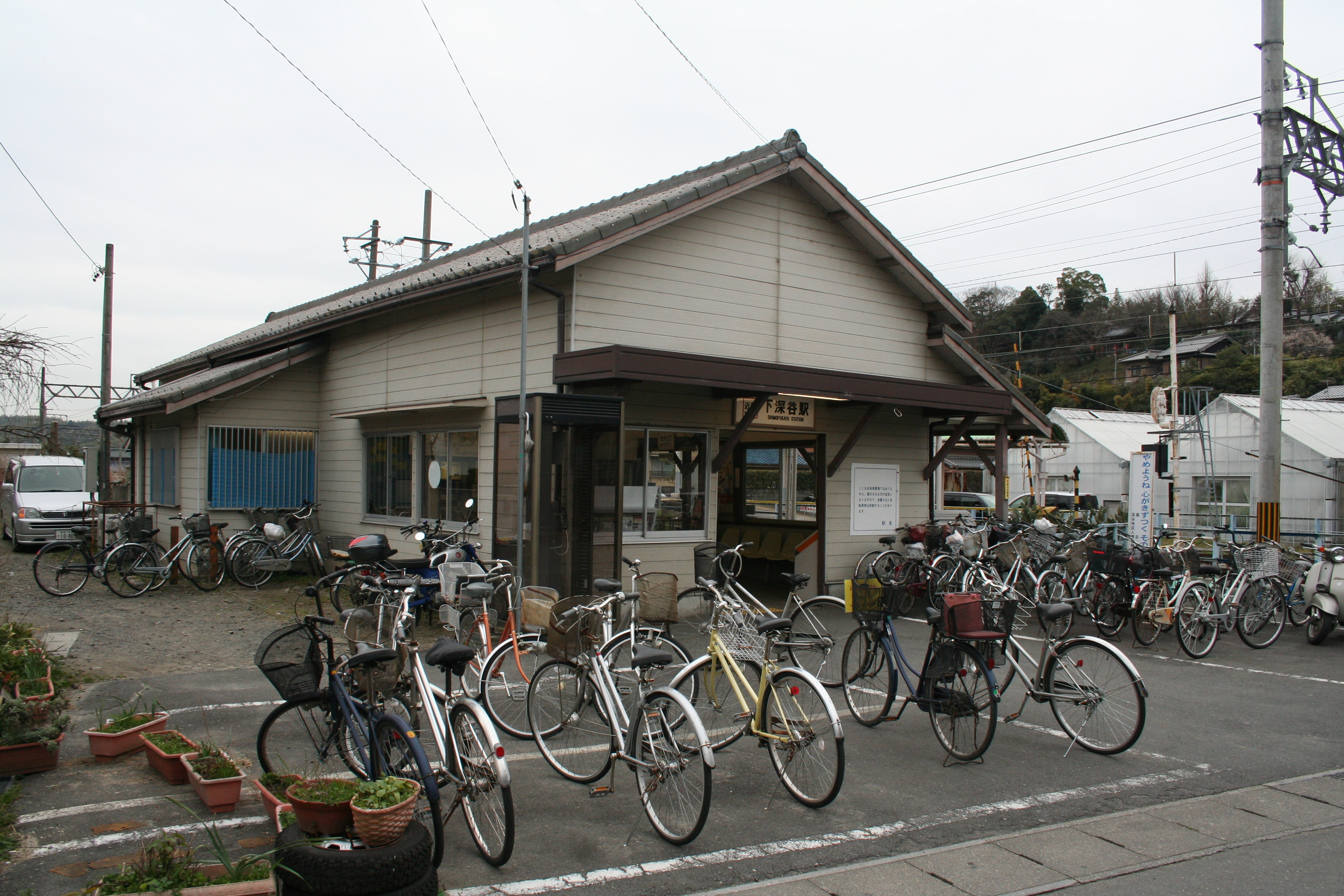
- Shimo-Fukaya Station

General information
- Location: 2279 Shimo-Fukaya, Kuwana-shi, Mie-ken 511-0808; Japan
- Coordinates: 35.0964°N 136.6620°E
- Operator: Yōrō Railway
- Line: ■ Yōrō Line
- Distance: 4.0 km from Kuwana
- Platforms: 1 island platform
- Tracks: 2

Other information
- Status: Staffed
- Website: Official website (in Japanese)

History
- Opened: August 1, 1921

Passengers
- FY2019: 562
Location
- Location within Mie Prefecture Location within Japan

Shimo-Fukaya Station (下深谷駅, Shimo-Fukaya-eki) is a passenger railway station located in the city of Kuwana, Mie Prefecture, Japan, operated by the private railway operator Yōrō Railway.

== Lines ==
Shimo-Fukaya Station is a station on the Yōrō Line, and is located 4.0 rail kilometers from the terminus of the line at Kuwana.

== Station layout ==
The station consists of one unnumbered island platform connected to the station building by a level crossing.

=== Platforms ===
| Station side | ■ Yōrō Line | for Kuwana |
| Opposite side | ■ Yōrō Line | for Yōrō, Ōgaki |

== Adjacent stations ==
| « | Service | » |
Yōrō Railway
Yōrō Line
| Harima | - | Shimo-Noshiro |

== History ==
Shimo-Fukaya Station opened on August 1, 1921 as a station on the Yōrō Railway. The Yōrō Railway became the Ise Electric Railway’s Yōrō Line on October 1, 1929, but re-emerged as the Yōrō Railway on April 20, 1936. It merged with the Sangu Electric Railway on August 1, 1940, and through a series of mergers became part of the Kansai Express Railway on June 1, 1944. The line was split off into the new Yōrō Railway on October 1, 2007.

== Passenger statistics ==
In fiscal 2019, the station was used by an average of 562 passengers daily (boarding passengers only).

== Surrounding area ==
- Mie Prefectural Kuwana Kita High School
- Kuwana City Fukaya Elementary School

== See also ==
- List of railway stations in Japan
