= Tado Station =

Railway station in Kuwana, Mie Prefecture, Japan

Tado Station 多度駅
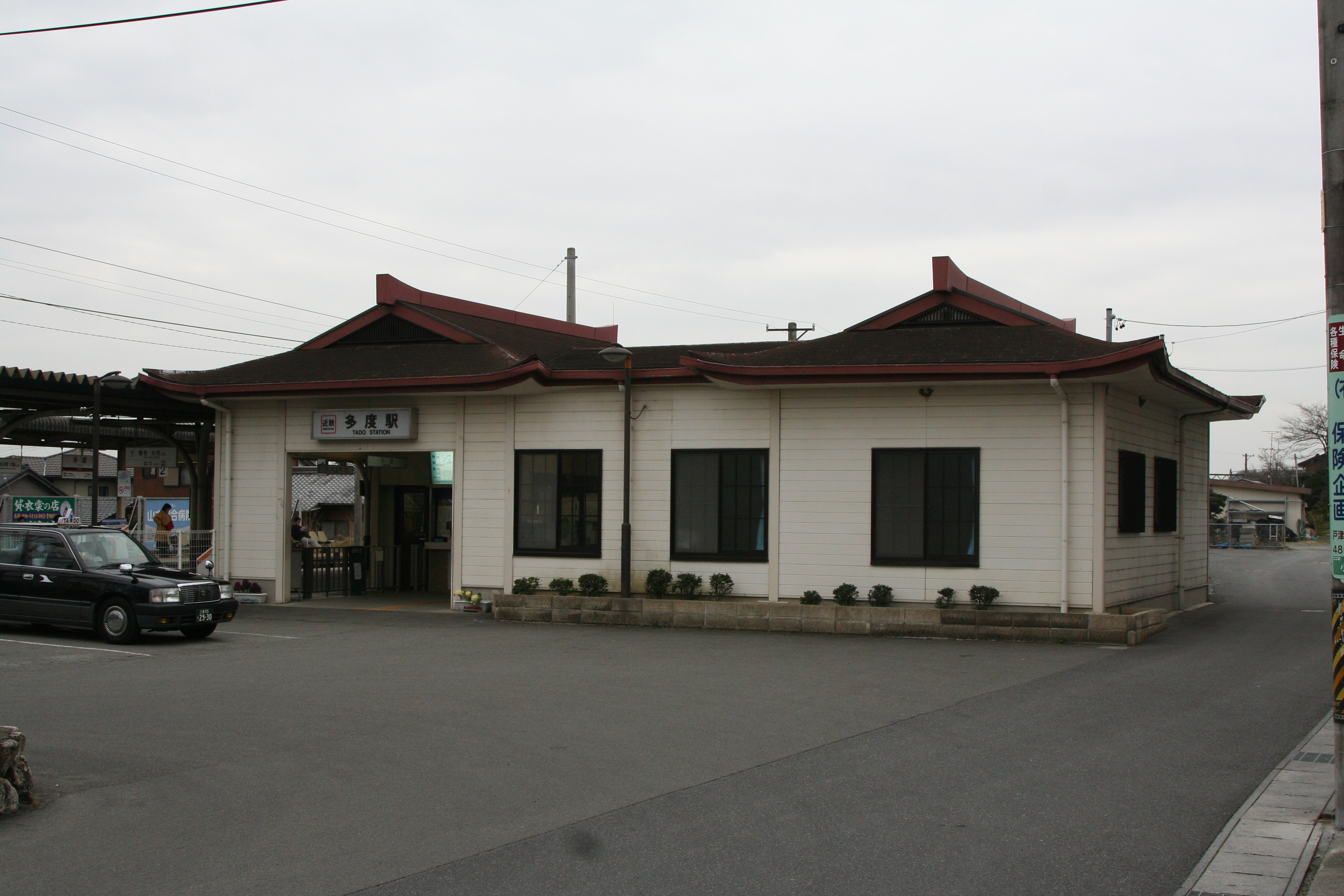
- Tado Station in February 2007

General information
- Location: 1860-2 Tado-Koyama, Kuwana-shi, Mie-ken 511-0105; Japan
- Coordinates: 35.1337°N 136.6407°E
- Operator: Yōrō Railway
- Line: ■ Yōrō Line
- Distance: 8.6 km from Kuwana
- Platforms: 1 side +1 island platform
- Tracks: 2

Other information
- Status: Staffed
- Website: Official website (in Japanese)

History
- Opened: April 27, 1919

Passengers
- FY2019: 731
Location
- Location within Mie Prefecture Location within Japan

Tado Station (多度駅, Tado-eki) is a passenger railway station located in the city of Kuwana, Mie Prefecture, Japan, operated by the private railway operator Yōrō Railway.

== Lines ==
Tado Station is a station on the Yōrō Line, and is located 8.6 rail kilometers from the terminus of the line at Kuwana.

== Station layout ==
The station consists of one ground-level side platform and one ground-level island platform connected by a level crossing, with the station building located on one side of the side platform. However, one half of the island platform is not in use. The station is staffed.

=== Platforms ===
1	■ Yōrō Line	for Ibi and Ōgaki
2	■ Yōrō Line	for Kuwana
3	■ Yōrō Line	(not in use)

== Adjacent stations ==
«	Service	»
Yōrō Railway
Yōrō Line
Shimo-Noshiro	-	Mino-Matsuyama

== History ==
Tado Station opened on April 27, 1919 as a station on the Yōrō Railway. The Yōrō Railway became the Ise Electric Railway’s Yōrō Line on October 1, 1929, but re-emerged as the Yōrō Railway on April 20, 1936. It merged with the Sangu Electric Railway on August 1, 1940, and through a series of mergers became part of the Kansai Express Railway on June 1, 1944. The line was split off into the new Yōrō Railway on October 1, 2007.

== Passenger statistics ==
In fiscal 2019, the station was used by an average of 731 passengers daily (boarding passengers only).

== Surrounding area ==
- Japan National Route 258

== See also ==
- List of railway stations in Japan
