= Mino-Takada Station =

Railway station in Yōrō, Gifu Prefecture, Japan

Mino-Takada Station 美濃高田駅
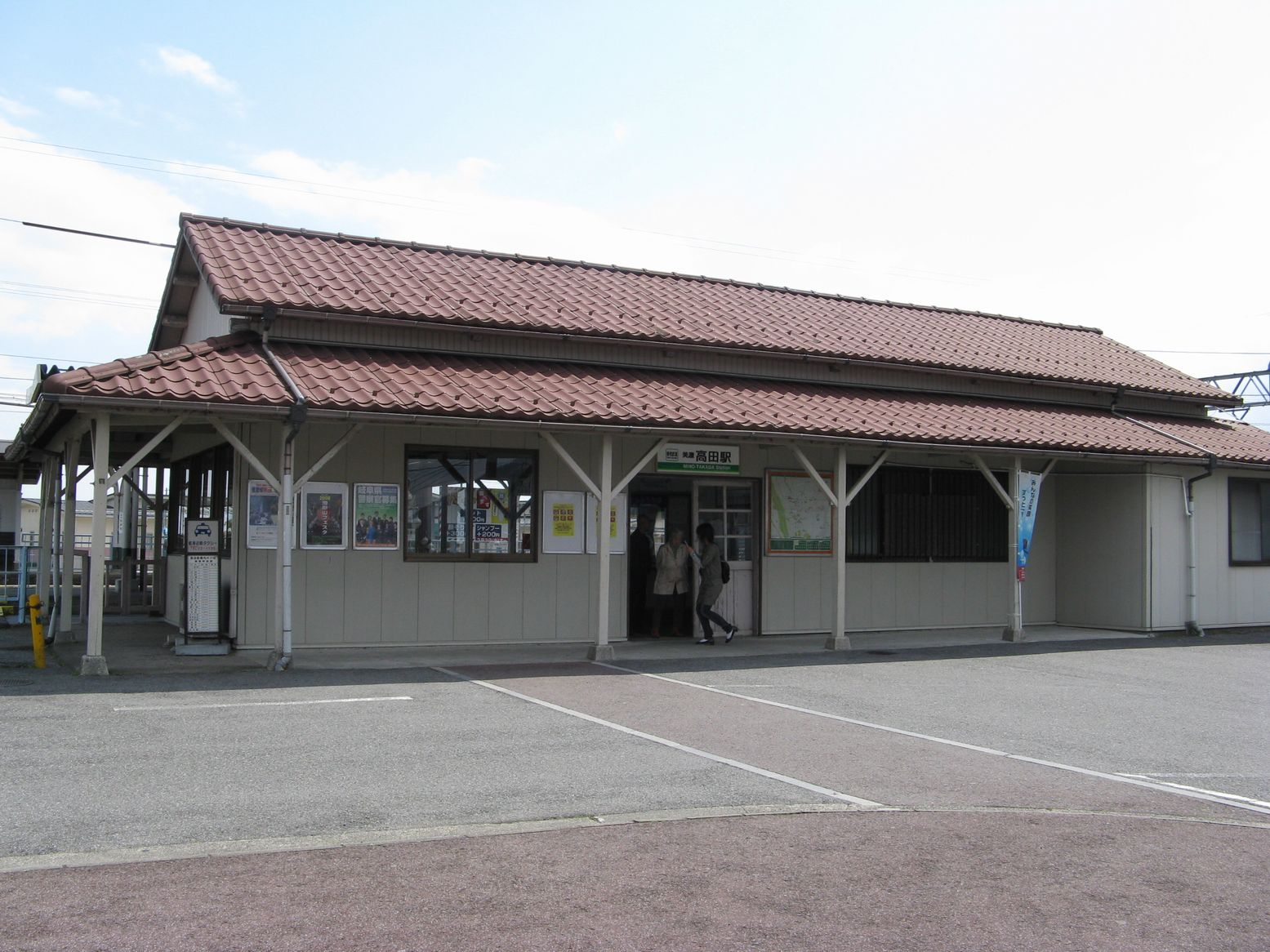
- Mino-Takada Station in May 2008

General information
- Location: Takeda, Yōrō-cho, Yōrō-gun, Gifu-ken 503-1314; Japan
- Coordinates: 35.3093°N 136.5637°E
- Operator: Yōrō Railway
- Line: ■ Yōrō Line
- Distance: 31.8 km from Kuwana
- Platforms: 2 side platforms
- Tracks: 2

Other information
- Status: Unstaffed
- Website: Official website (in Japanese)

History
- Opened: July 31, 1913

Passengers
- FY2015: 892
Location
- Location within Japan

Mino-Takada Station (美濃高田駅, Mino-Takada-eki) is a railway station in the town of Yōrō, Yōrō District, Gifu Prefecture, Japan, operated by the private railway operator Yōrō Railway.

== Lines ==
Mino-Takada Station is a station on the Yōrō Line, and is located 31.8 rail kilometers from the opposing terminus of the line at Kuwana.

== Station layout ==
Mino-Takada Station has two opposed ground-level side platforms connected by a level crossing. The station is unattended.

=== Platforms ===
west	■ Yōrō Line	for Ibi and Ōgaki
east	■ Yōrō Line	for Kuwana

== Adjacent stations ==
«	Service	»
Yōrō Railway
Yōrō Line
Yōrō	-	Karasue

== History ==
Mino-Takada Station opened on July 31, 1913.

== Passenger statistics ==
In fiscal 2015, the station was used by an average of 892 passengers daily (boarding passengers only).

== Surrounding area ==
- Yōrō Town Hall

== See also ==
- List of railway stations in Japan
