= Ishizu Station (Gifu) =

Railway station in Kaizu, Gifu Prefecture, Japan

Ishizu Station 石津駅
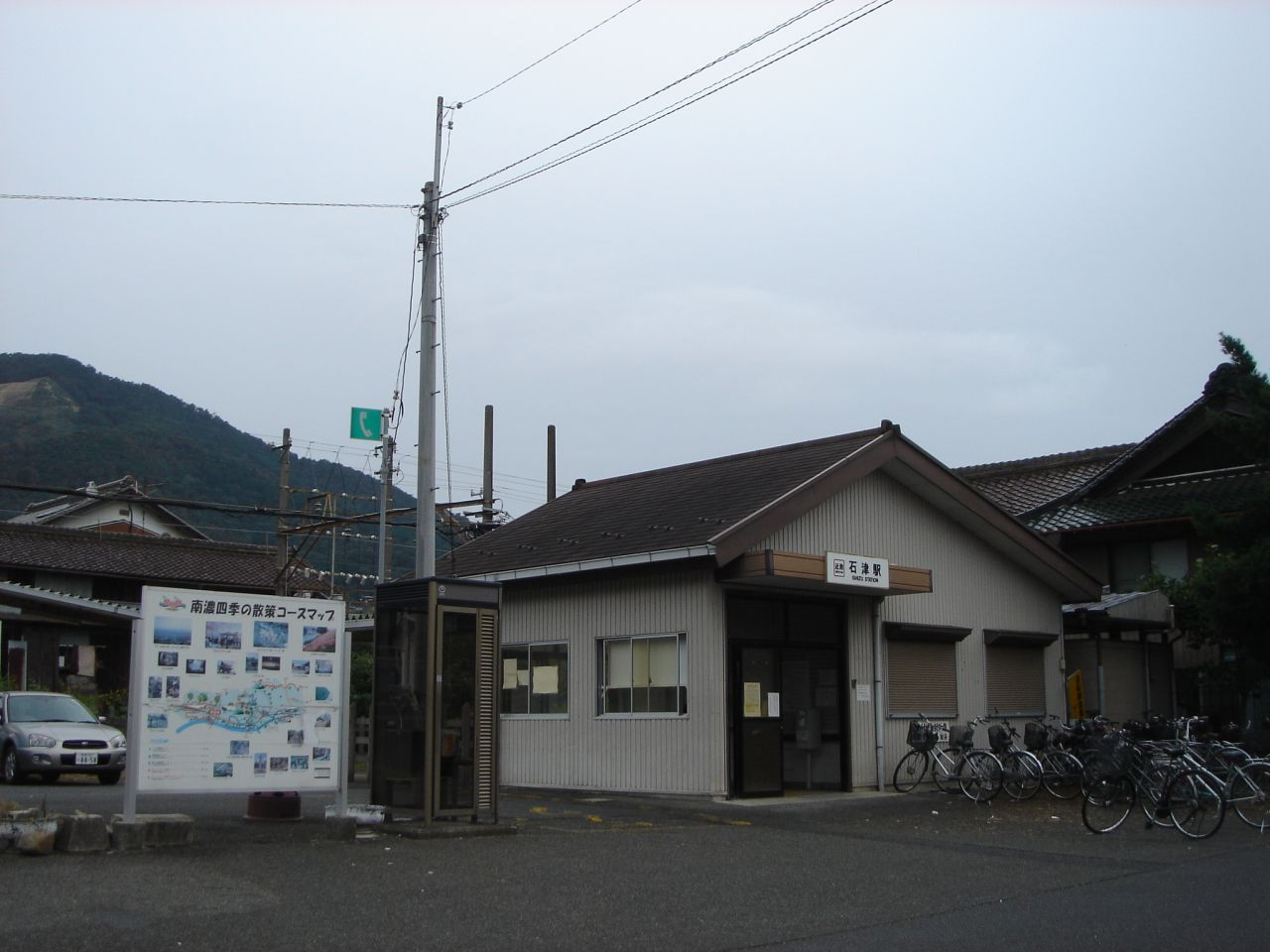
- Ishizu Station in September 2007

General information
- Location: Nanno-cho Ota, Kaizu-shi, Gifu-ken 503-0532; Japan
- Coordinates: 35°10′51.72″N 136°37′39.96″E
- Operator: Yōrō Railway
- Line: ■ Yōrō Line
- Distance: 14.2 km from Kuwana
- Platforms: 1 side platform
- Tracks: 1

Other information
- Status: Unstaffed
- Website: Official website (in Japanese)

History
- Opened: April 27, 1919

Passengers
- FY2015: 413
Location
- Location within Japan

Ishizu Station (石津駅, Ishizu-eki) is a railway station in the city of Kaizu, Gifu Prefecture, Japan, operated by the private railway operator Yōrō Railway.

== Lines ==
Ishizu Station is a station on the Yōrō Line, and is located14.2 rail kilometers from the opposing terminus of the line at Kuwana.

== Station layout ==
Ishizu Station has one ground-level side platform serving single bi-directional track. The station is unattended.

== Adjacent stations ==
«	Service	»
Yōrō Railway
Yōrō Line
Mino-Matsuyama	-	Mino-Yamazaki

== History ==
Ishizu Station opened on April 27, 1919.

== Passenger statistics ==
In fiscal 2015, the station was used by an average of 413 passengers daily (boarding passengers only).

== Surrounding area ==
- Ibi River
- National Route 258

== See also ==
- List of railway stations in Japan
