= Mino-Yanagi Station =

Railway station in Ōgaki, Gifu Prefecture, Japan

Mino-Yanagi Station 美濃青柳駅
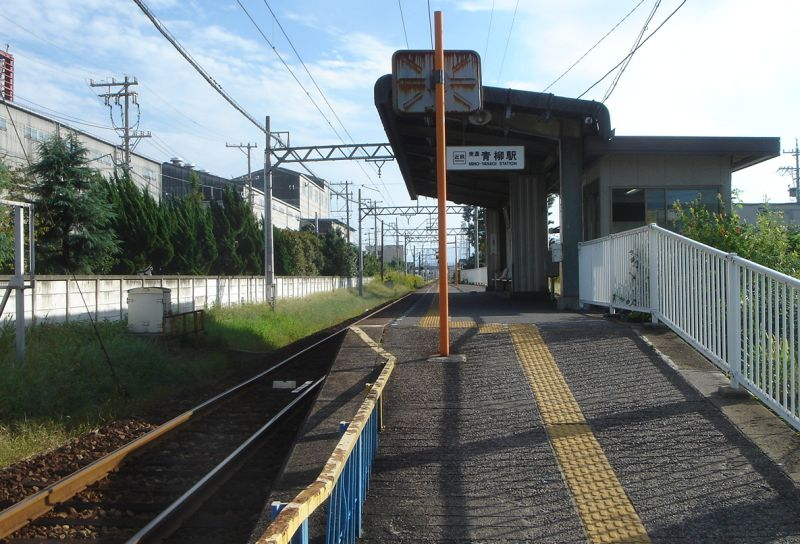
- Mino-Yanagi Station in November 2005

General information
- Location: Aoyanagi-cho, Ōgaki-shi, Gifu-ken 503-0961; Japan
- Coordinates: 35.3436°N 136.6036°E
- Operator: Yōrō Railway
- Line: ■ Yōrō Line
- Distance: 39.4 km from Kuwana
- Platforms: 1 side platform
- Tracks: 1

Other information
- Status: Unstaffed
- Website: Official website (in Japanese)

History
- Opened: June 1, 1934

Passengers
- FY2015: 491
Location
- Location within Gifu Prefecture Location within Japan

Mino-Yanagi Station (美濃青柳駅, Mino-Yanagi-eki) is a railway station in the city of Ōgaki, Gifu Prefecture Japan, operated by the private railway operator Yōrō Railway.

== Lines ==
Mino-Yanagi Station is a station on the Yōrō Line, and is located 39.4 rail kilometers from the opposing terminus of the line at Kuwana.

== Station layout ==
Mino-Yanagi Station has one side platform serving a single bi-directional track. The station is unattended.

== Adjacent stations ==
«	Service	»
Yōrō Railway
Yōrō Line
Tomoe	-	Nishi-Ōgaki

== History ==
Mino-Yanagi Station opened on June 1, 1934.

== Passenger statistics ==
In fiscal 2015, the station was used by an average of 491 passengers daily (boarding passengers only).

== Surrounding area ==
- Ogaki Industrial High School

== See also ==
- List of railway stations in Japan
