= Harima Station =

Railway station in Kuwana, Mie Prefecture, Japan

Harima Station 播磨駅
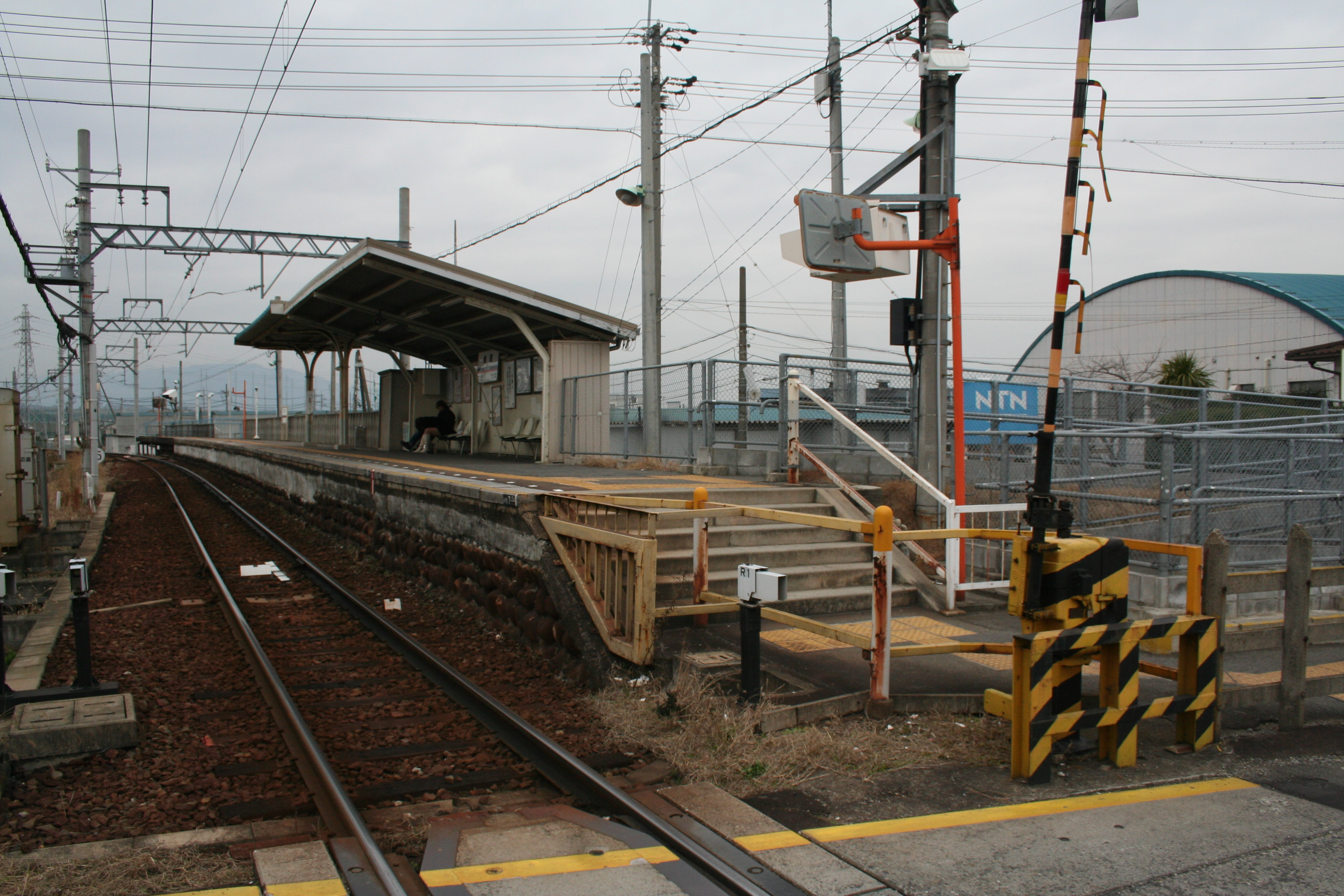
- Harima Station

General information
- Location: 2500-3 Harima, Kuwana-shi, Mie-ken 511-0811; Japan
- Coordinates: 35.0782°N 136.6748°E
- Operator: Yōrō Railway
- Line: ■ Yōrō Line
- Distance: 1.6 km from Kuwana
- Platforms: 1 side platform
- Tracks: 2

Other information
- Website: Official website (in Japanese)

History
- Opened: December 29, 1939

Passengers
- FY2019: 265
Location
- Location within Mie Prefecture Location within Japan

Harima Station (播磨駅, Harima-eki) is a passenger railway station located in the city of Kuwana, Mie Prefecture, Japan, operated by the private railway operator Yōrō Railway.

== Lines ==
Harima Station is a station on the Yōrō Line, and is located 1.6 rail kilometers from the terminus of the line at Kuwana.

== Station layout ==
The station consists of one side platform serving bi-directional traffic. There is no station building but only a weather shelter on the platform. The station is unattended.

=== Platforms ===
| 1 | ■ Yōrō Line | For Yōrō, Ōgaki; For Kuwana |

== Adjacent stations ==
| « | Service | » |
Yōrō Railway
Yōrō Line
| Kuwana | - | Shimo-Fukaya |

== History ==
Harima Station opened on December 29, 1939, as a station on the Yōrō Railway. The Yōrō Railway merged with the Sangu Electric Railway on August 1, 1940, and through a series of mergers became part of the Kansai Express Railway on June 1, 1944. The line was split off into the new Yōrō Railway on October 1, 2007.

== Passenger statistics ==
In fiscal 2019, the station was used by an average of 265 passengers daily (boarding passengers only).

== Surrounding area ==
- Kuwana Harima Post Office

== See also ==
- List of railway stations in Japan
