= Muro Station =

Railway station in Ōgaki, Gifu Prefecture, Japan

Muro Station 室駅
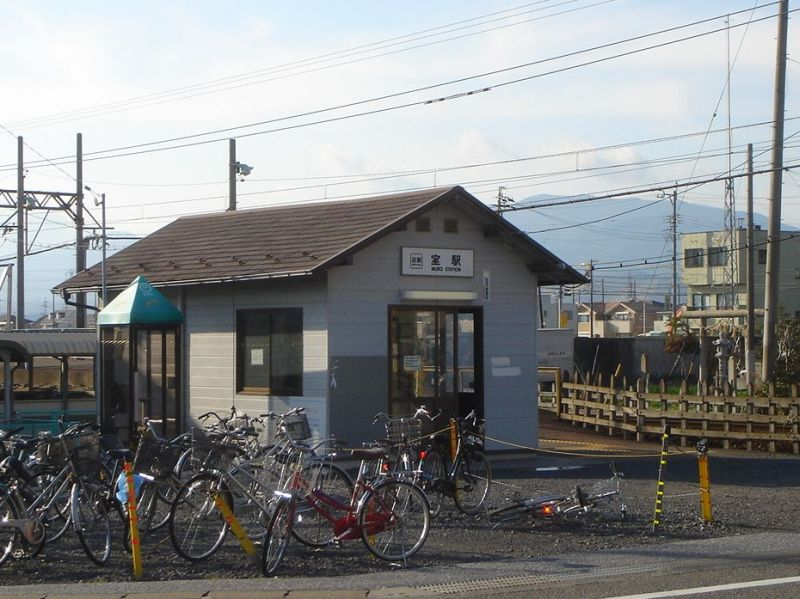
- Muro Station in November 2006

General information
- Location: 134-3 Kido-cho Kasagi-cho, Ōgaki-shi, Gifu-ken 503-0973; Japan
- Coordinates: 35°22′2.12″N 136°36′22.5″E
- Operator: Yōrō Railway
- Line: ■ Yōrō Line
- Distance: 44.1 km from Kuwana
- Platforms: 1 side platform
- Tracks: 1

Other information
- Status: Unstaffed
- Website: Official website (in Japanese)

History
- Opened: April 1, 1916

Passengers
- FY2015: 625
Location
- Location within Gifu Prefecture Location within Japan

Muro Station (室駅, Muro-eki) is a railway station in the city of Ōgaki, Gifu Prefecture, Japan, operated by the private railway operator Yōrō Railway.

== Lines ==
Muro Station is a station on the Yōrō Line, and is located 44.1 rail kilometers from the opposing terminus of the line at Kuwana.

== Station layout ==
Muro Station has one ground-level side platform serving single bi-directional track. The station is unattended.

== Adjacent stations ==
«	Service	»
Yōrō Railway
Yōrō Line
Ōgaki	-	Kita-Ōgaki

== History ==
Muro Station opened on April 1, 1916.

== Passenger statistics ==
In fiscal 2015, the station was used by an average of 625 passengers daily (boarding passengers only).

== Surrounding area ==
- Ōgaki Municipal Library

== See also ==
- List of railway stations in Japan
