= Ōtoba Station (Gifu) =

Railway station in Ōgaki, Gifu Prefecture, Japan

Ōtoba Station 大外羽駅
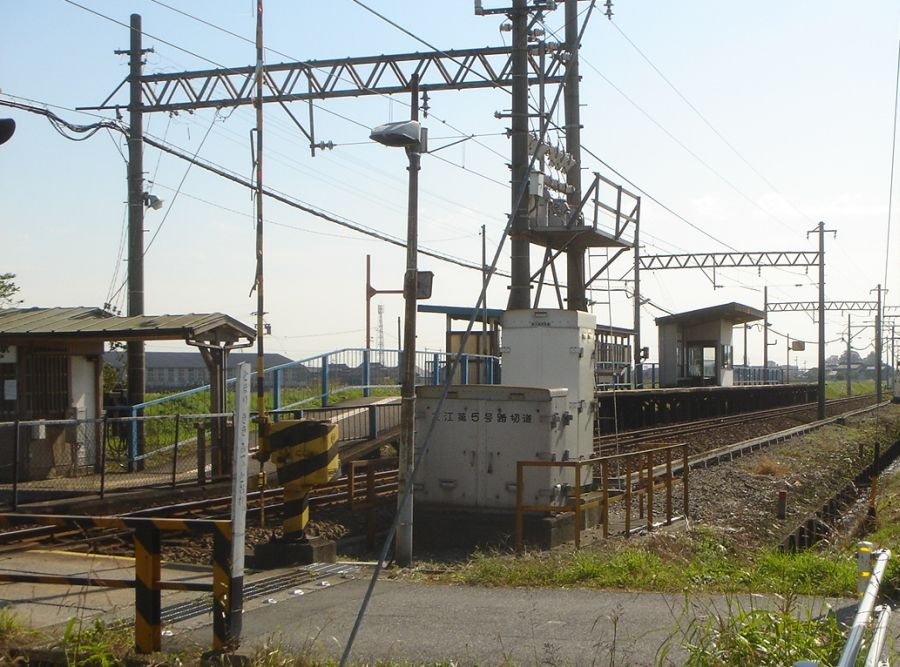
- Ōtoba Station in November 2005

General information
- Location: Ōtoba 3-chome, Ōgaki-shi, Gifu-ken 503-0963; Japan
- Coordinates: 35.3151°N 136.5973°E
- Operator: Yōrō Railway
- Line: ■ Yōrō Line
- Distance: 36.0 km from Kuwana
- Platforms: 1 side platform
- Tracks: 1

Other information
- Status: Unstaffed
- Website: Official website (in Japanese)

History
- Opened: June 1, 1974

Passengers
- FY2015: 722
Location
- Location within Gifu Prefecture Location within Japan

Nishi-Ōgaki Station (西大垣駅, Nishi-Ōgaki-eki) is a railway station in the city of Ōgaki, Gifu Prefecture Japan, operated by the private railway operator Yōrō Railway.

== Lines ==
Ōtoba Station is a station on the Yōrō Line, and is located 36.0 rail kilometers from the opposing terminus of the line at Kuwana.

== Station layout ==
Ōtoba Station has one ground-level side platform serving a single bi-directional track. The station is unattended.

== Adjacent stations ==
«	Service	»
Yōrō Railway
Yōrō Line
Karasue	-	Tomoe

== History ==
Ōtoba Station opened on June 1, 1974.

== Passenger statistics ==
In fiscal 2015, the station was used by an average of 722 passengers daily (boarding passengers only).

== Surrounding area ==
- Ogaki Minami Industrial High School
- Ogaki Special Education School

== See also ==
- List of railway stations in Japan
