= Tomoe Station =

Railway station in Ōgaki, Gifu Prefecture, Japan

Tomoe Station 友江駅
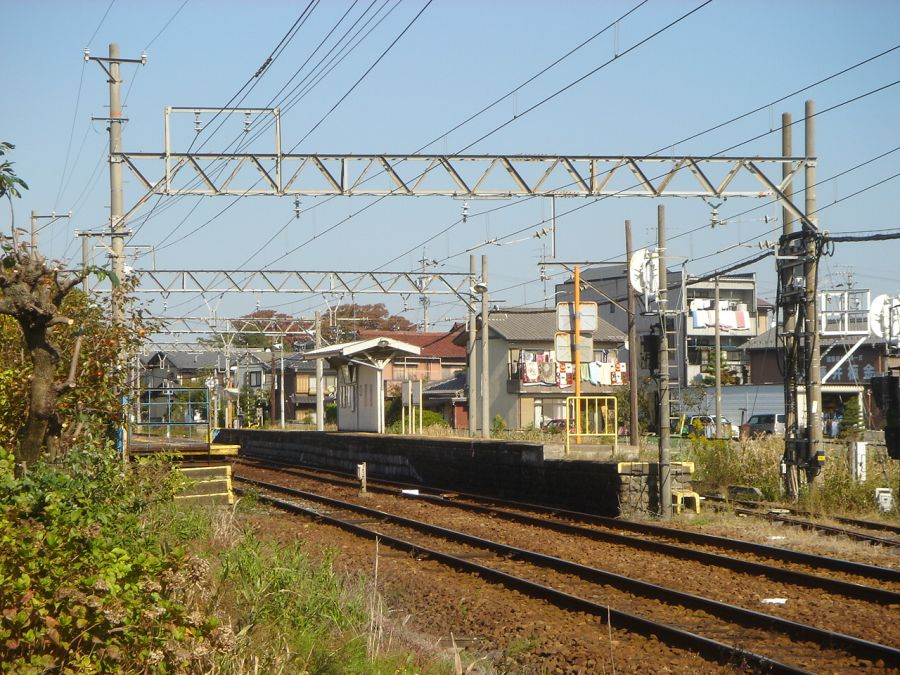
- Tomoe Station in November 2005

General information
- Location: 1-221 Tomoe-cho, Ōgaki-shi, Gifu-ken 503-0955; Japan
- Coordinates: 35.3266°N 136.6009°E
- Operator: Yōrō Railway
- Line: ■ Yōrō Line
- Distance: 37.4 km from Kuwana
- Platforms: 1 side + 1 island platform
- Tracks: 2

Other information
- Status: Unstaffed
- Website: Official website (in Japanese)

History
- Opened: July 31, 1913

Passengers
- FY2015: 403
Location
- Location within Gifu Prefecture Location within Japan

Tomoe Station (友江駅, Tomoe-eki) is a railway station in the city of Ōgaki, Gifu Prefecture Japan, operated by the private railway operator Yōrō Railway.

== Lines ==
Tomoe Station is a station on the Yōrō Line, and is located 37.4 rail kilometers from the opposing terminus of the line at Kuwana.

== Station layout ==
Tomoe Station has a single ground-level side platform and a single ground-level island platform connected by a level crossing; however, one side of the island platform is not in use. The station is unattended.

=== Platforms ===
side	■ Yōrō Line	for Ōgaki
island	■ Yōrō Line	for Kuwana

== Adjacent stations ==
«	Service	»
Yōrō Railway
Yōrō Line
Ōtoba	-	Mino-Yanagi

== History ==
Tomoe Station opened on July 31, 1913.

== Passenger statistics ==
In fiscal 2015, the station was used by an average of 403 passengers daily (boarding passengers only).

== Surrounding area ==
- Tomoe Post Office

== See also ==
- List of railway stations in Japan
