= Kita-Ōgaki Station =

Railway station in Ōgaki, Gifu Prefecture, Japan

Kita-Ōgaki Station 北大垣駅
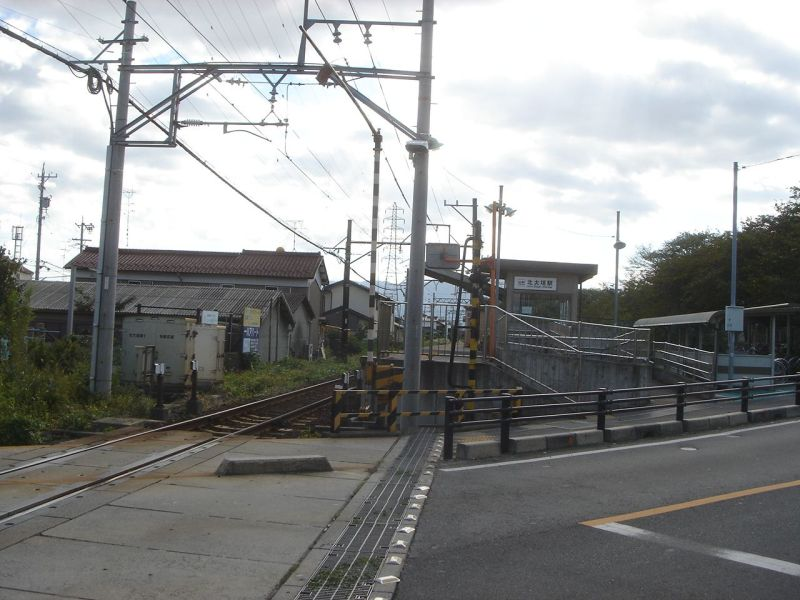
- Kita-Ōgaki Station in November 2006

General information
- Location: 76-3 Kasagi-cho, Ōgaki-shi, Gifu-ken 503-0023; Japan
- Coordinates: 35.3755°N 136.6022°E
- Operator: Yōrō Railway
- Line: ■ Yōrō Line
- Distance: 45.4 km from Kuwana
- Platforms: 1 side platform
- Tracks: 1

Other information
- Status: Unstaffed
- Website: Official website (in Japanese)

History
- Opened: July 1, 1944

Passengers
- FY2015: 379
Location
- Location within Gifu Prefecture Location within Japan

Kita-Ōgaki Station (北大垣駅, Kita-Ōgaki-eki) is a railway station in the city of Ōgaki, Gifu Prefecture Japan, operated by the private railway operator Yōrō Railway.

== Lines ==
Kita-Ōgaki Station is a station on the Yōrō Line, and is located 45.4 rail kilometers from the opposing terminus of the line at Kuwana.

== Station layout ==
Kita-Ōgaki Station has one ground-level side platform serving single bi-directional track. The station is unattended.

== Adjacent stations ==
«	Service	»
Yōrō Railway
Yōrō Line
Muro	-	Higashi-Akasaka

== History ==
Kita-Ōgaki Station opened on July 1, 1944.

== Passenger statistics ==
In fiscal 2015, the station was used by an average of 379 passengers daily (boarding passengers only).

== Surrounding area ==
- Tsushima Jinja

== See also ==
- List of railway stations in Japan
