= Karasue Station =

Railway station in Yōrō, Gifu Prefecture, Japan

Karasue Station 烏江駅
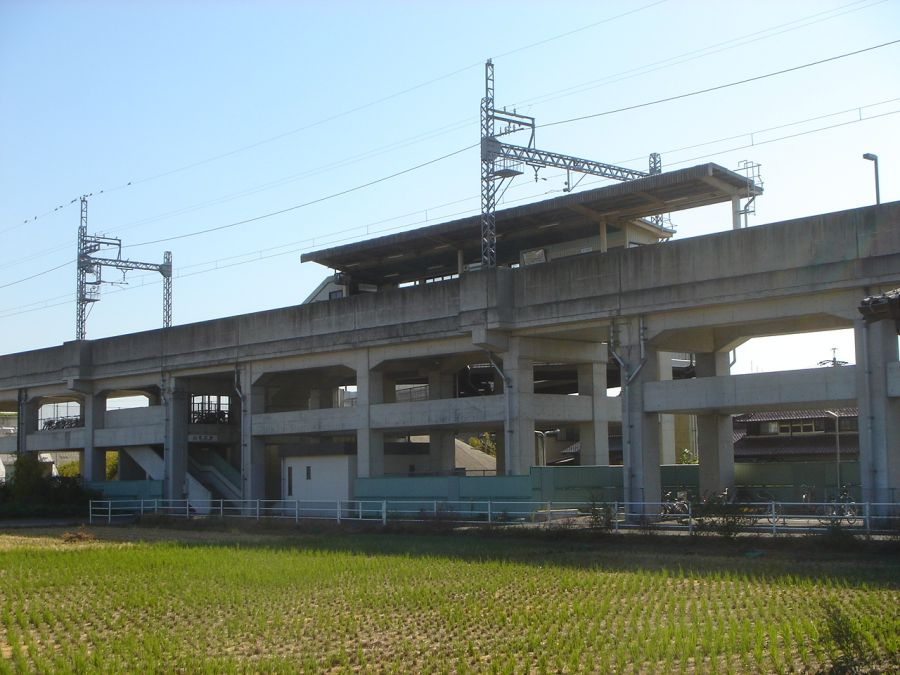
- Karasue Station in November 2005

General information
- Location: 940-4 Karasue, Yōrō-cho, Yōrō-gun, Gifu-ken 503-1315; Japan
- Coordinates: 35.3053°N 136.5921°E
- Operator: Yōrō Railway
- Line: ■ Yōrō Line
- Distance: 34.5 km from Kuwana
- Platforms: 1 side platform
- Tracks: 1

Other information
- Status: Unstaffed
- Website: Official website (in Japanese)

History
- Opened: January 1, 1915.

Passengers
- FY2015: 900
Location
- Location within Japan

Karasue Station (烏江駅, Karasue-eki) is a railway station in the town of Yōrō, Yōrō District, Gifu Prefecture, Japan, operated by the private railway operator Yōrō Railway.

== Lines ==
Karasue Station is a station on the Yōrō Line, and is located 34.5 rail kilometers from the opposing terminus of the line at Kuwana.

== Station layout ==
Karasue Station has one elevated side platform serving a single bi-directional track. The station is unattended.

== Adjacent stations ==
«	Service	»
Yōrō Railway
Yōrō Line
Mino-Takada	-	Ōtoba

== History ==
Karasue Station opened on January 1, 1915. This station was elevated in 1997 for renovation of the Ibi River tributary Makita River and Kuise River.

== Passenger statistics ==
In fiscal 2015, the station was used by an average of 900 passengers daily (boarding passengers only).

== Surrounding area ==
- Ogaki Yōrō High School

== See also ==
- List of railway stations in Japan
