= Kaizu =

Kaizu 海津市
- City
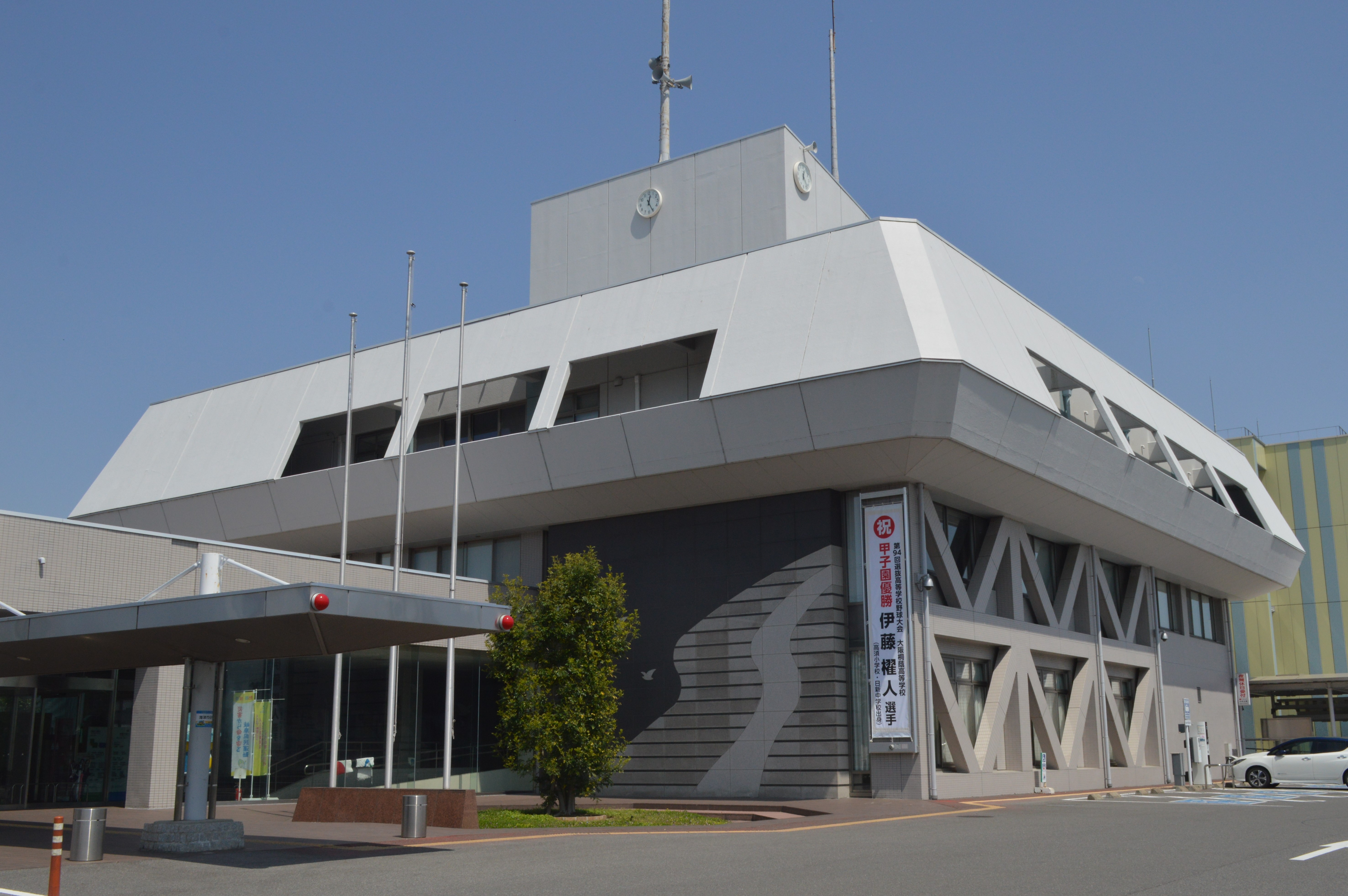
- Kaizu City Hall

- Flag Seal

- Location of Kaizu in Gifu Prefecture

- Coordinates: 35°13′14″N 136°38′11.3″E
- Country: Japan
- Region: Chūbu
- Prefecture: Gifu

Government
  - Mayor: Masumi Yokogawa (since May 2021)

Area
  - Total: 112.03 km^{2} (43.26 sq mi)

Population (April 1, 2018)
  - Total: 34,960
  - Density: 312.1/km^{2} (808.2/sq mi)
- Time zone: UTC+9 (Japan Standard Time)
- City symbols
- Tree: Pine
- Flower: Satsuma flower
- Fish: Catfish
- Phone number: 0584-53-1111
- Address: 515 Takasu, Kaizu-chō, Kaizu-shi, Gifu-ken 503-0695
- Website: Official website

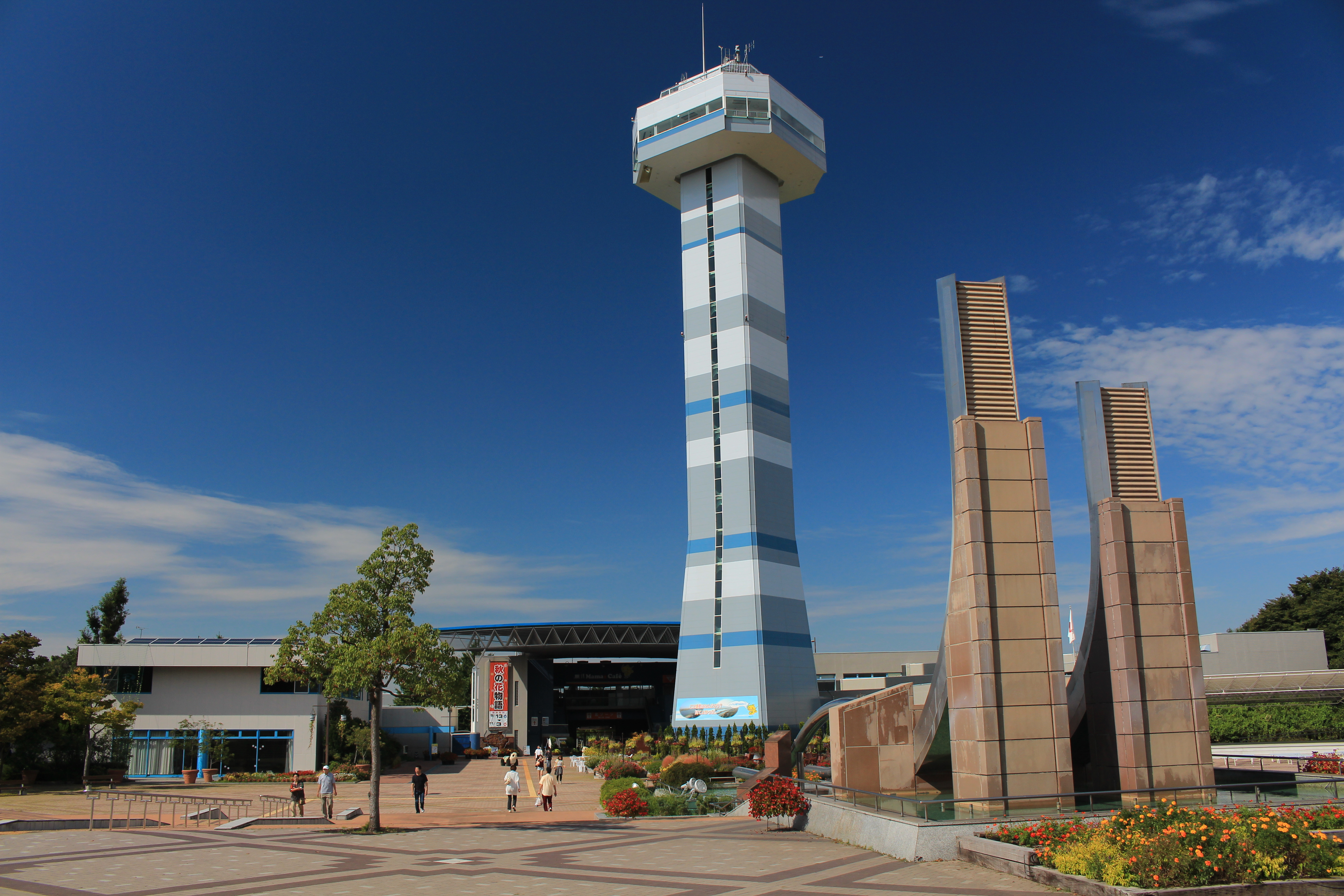
Kiso Sansen Park Center

Kaizu (海津市, Kaizu-shi) is a city located in Gifu, Japan. As of 1 April 2018, the city had an estimated population of 34,960, and a population density of 310 persons per km^{2}, in 12,167 households. The total area of the city was 112.03 square kilometres (43.26 sq mi). Most of the city is located at sea level and is well known for levees surrounding the area.

== Geography ==
Kaizu is located in the extreme southwest corner of Gifu Prefecture. Levees are the most visible feature surrounding the city. To the west of the city is the border of Gifu and Mie prefectures, where the Yōrō Mountains run from north-to-south and the three major rivers of the Nōbi Plain (the Ibi, Nagara, and Kiso rivers) merge. The Tsuya, Ōgure, and Ōe rivers also flow through the city.

=== Climate ===
The city has a climate characterized by characterized by hot and humid summers, and mild winters (Köppen climate classification Cfa). The average annual temperature in Kaizu is 15.4 °C. The average annual rainfall is 1773 mm with September as the wettest month. The temperatures are highest on average in August, at around 27.7 °C, and lowest in January, at around 4.3 °C.

=== Neighbouring municipalities ===
- Aichi Prefecture
  - Aisai
  - Inazawa
- Gifu Prefecture
  - Hashima
  - Wanouchi
  - Yōrō
- Mie Prefecture
  - Inabe
  - Kuwana

== Demographics ==
Per Japanese census data, the population of Kaizu peaked around the year 2000 and has declined steadily since.

Historical population
Year	Pop.	±%
1970	31,206	—
1980	37,671	+20.7%
1990	40,811	+8.3%
2000	41,204	+1.0%
2010	37,941	−7.9%
2020	32,735	−13.7%

== History ==
The area around Kaizu was part of traditional Mino Province. A midden from Jōmon period was found in Kaizu, which includes sea shells, tools, and human remains. These artifacts indicate that the area was settled as early as 2,500 years ago. Around these period, Kaizu was much closer to the ocean and many basket clam shells can be found. In 1319, towards the end of the Kamakura period, the first circle levee was completed. Originally, levees were only on the upstream portion of the city, leaving the downstream side vulnerable to floods. Once the full circle levee was completed, numerous other circle levees were built in the surrounding area. During the Edo period, most of the area was divided between Takasu Domain and tenryō territory under direct control of the Tokugawa shogunate. Many of the events of the 1754 Horeki River incident occurred in this area. During the post-Meiji restoration cadastral reforms, the area was organised into Ishizu District, Gifu. The town of Takasu was created on July 1, 1889 with the establishment of the modern municipalities system. During the early Meiji period, the foreign advisor Johannis de Rijke worked on improving flood control and man of the dikes in this area. The town of Kaizu was established on January 15, 1954 by the merger of Takasu with four neighbouring villages. The modern city of Kaizu was established on March 28, 2005, from the merger of the former town of Kaizu, absorbing the towns of Hirata and Nannō (all from Kaizu District).

== Government ==
Kaizu has a mayor-council form of government with a directly elected mayor and a unicameral city legislature of 15 members.

== Economy ==
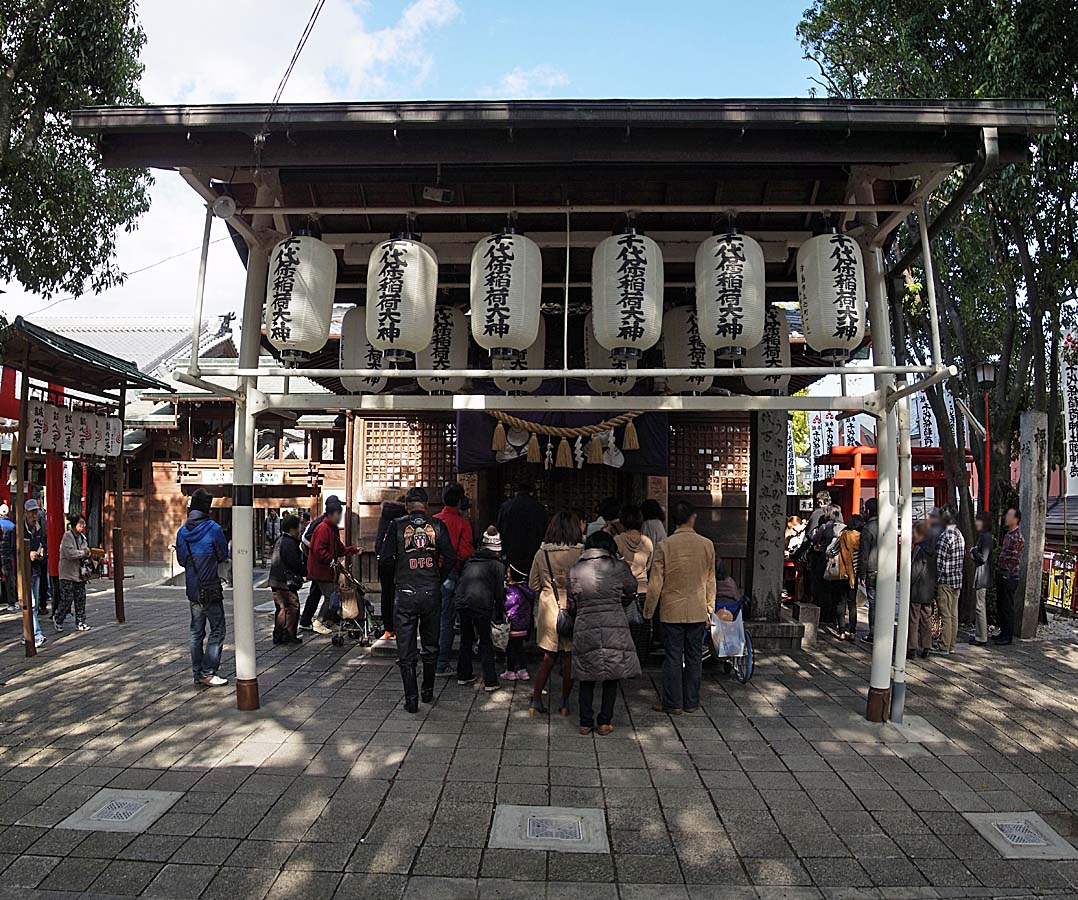
Chiyobo Inari Shrine

Agriculture is the mainstay of the local economy, with rice, wheat, soybeans, cucumbers, tomatoes and green pepper as the primary crops. The city is also home to mikan producers. Kaizu is the northernmost point in Japan that grows satsuma mikan extensively.

== Education ==
Kaizu has ten public elementary schools and four public middle schools operated by the city government, and one public high school operated by the Gifu Prefectural Board of Education. The prefecture also operates one special education school.

== Transportation ==
=== Railway ===
- Yōrō Railway Yōrō Line
  - Mino-Matsuyama - Ishizu - Mino-Yamazaki - Komano - Mino-Tsuya

=== Highway ===
- National Route 258

== Sister cities ==
- Avondale, Arizona, United States, since May 12, 1993

== Local attractions ==
Kaizu is home to Kisosansen Park. This is the location at which the Nagara, Ibi, and Kiso rivers meet. A panoramic view of the area can be viewed from an observation tower located in Kisosansen Park.
