= Yōrō, Gifu =

Yōrō 養老町
- Town
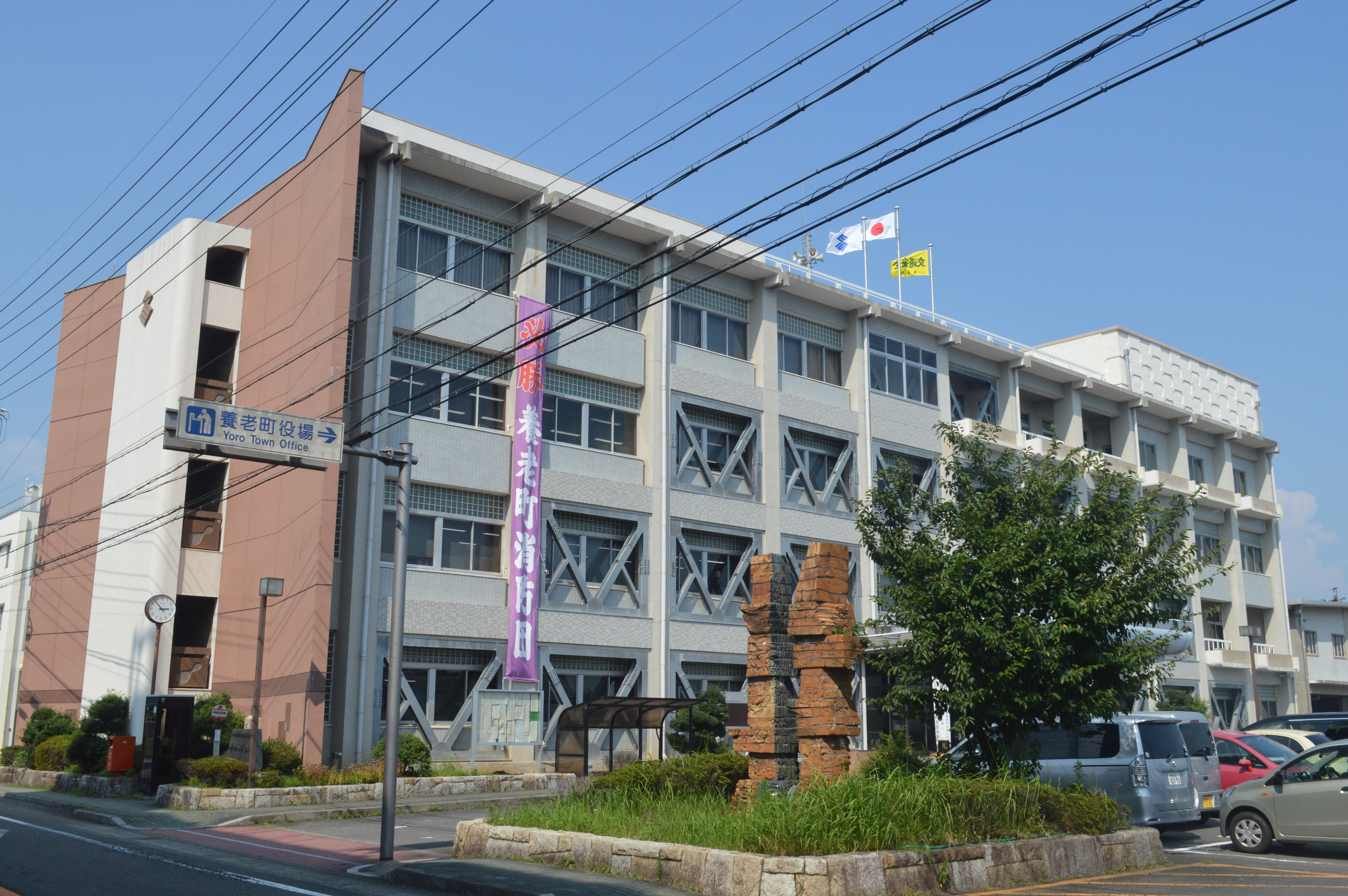
- Yōrō Town Hall

- Flag Seal

- Location of Yōrō in Gifu Prefecture

- Coordinates: 35°18′30.3″N 136°33′41″E
- Country: Japan
- Region: Chūbu
- Prefecture: Gifu
- District: Yōrō

Government
  - Mayor: Takashi Ōhashi

Area
  - Total: 72.29 km^{2} (27.91 sq mi)

Population (April 1, 2018)
  - Total: 29,309
  - Density: 405.4/km^{2} (1,050/sq mi)
- Time zone: UTC+9 (Japan Standard Time)
- City symbols
- Tree: Buxus microphylla
- Flower: Chrysanthemum morifolium
- Phone number: 0584-32-1100
- Address: Takada 798, Yōrō-chō, Yōrō-gun, Gifu-ken 503-1392
- Website: Official website

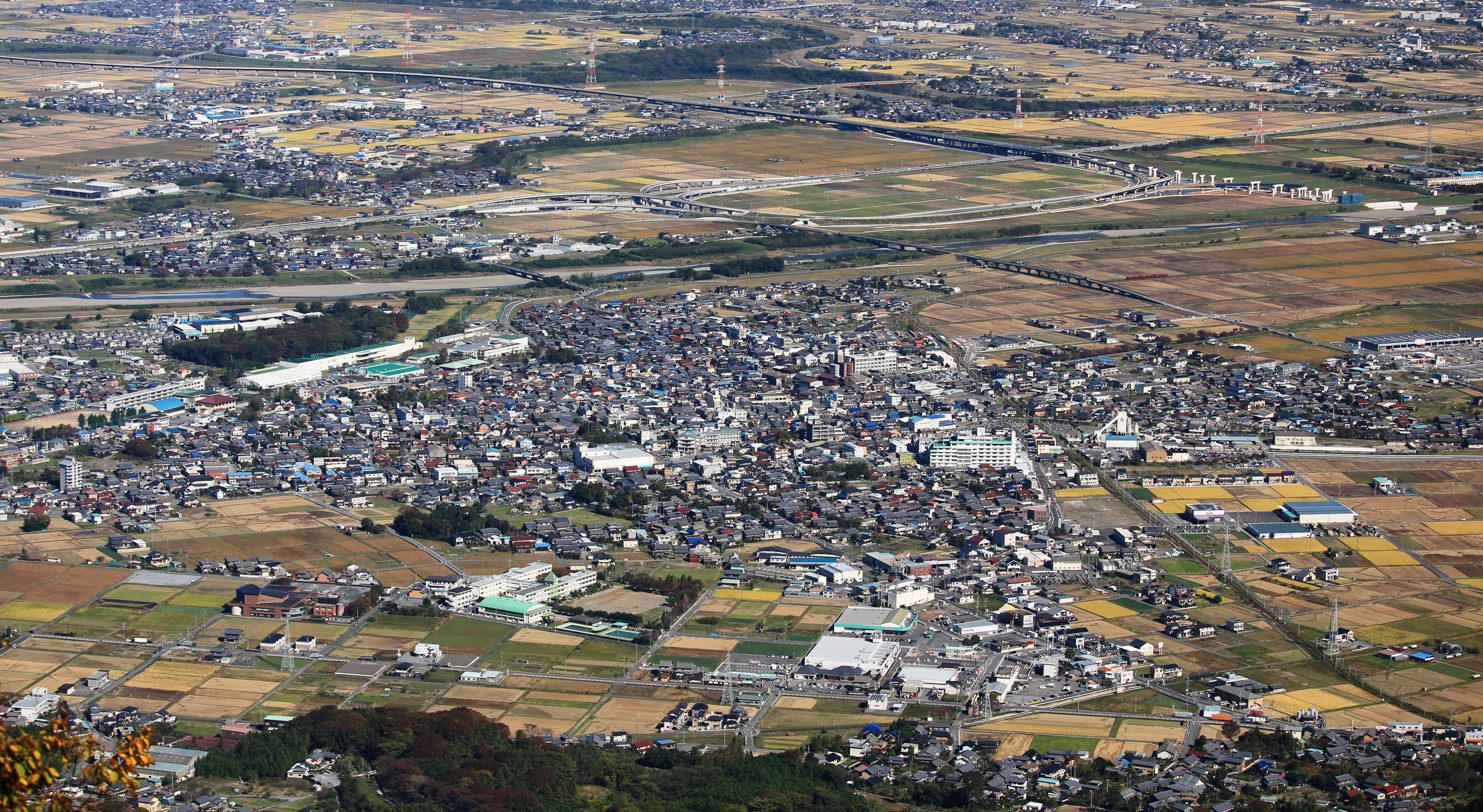
Central Yōrō seen from Yōrō Mountains

Yōrō (養老町, Yōrō-chō) is a town located in Yōrō District, Gifu Prefecture, Japan. As of 1 April 2018, the town had an estimated population of 29,309 in 10,356 households and a population density of 405 persons per km^{2}. The total area of the town was 72.29 square kilometres (27.91 sq mi).

== Geography ==
Yōrō is located in south-west Gifu Prefecture, with the Yōrō Mountains to the west and the plains of the Ibi River to the east, The Makita River also flows through the town. The town has a climate characterized by hot and humid summers, and mild winters (Köppen climate classification Cfa). The average annual temperature in Yōrō is 15.3 °C. The average annual rainfall is 1840 mm with September as the wettest month. The temperatures are highest on average in August, at around 27.6 °C, and lowest in January, at around 4.1 °C.

=== Neighbouring municipalities ===
- Gifu Prefecture
  - Ōgaki
  - Kaizu
  - Tarui
  - Wanouchi
- Mie Prefecture
  - Inabe

== Demographics ==
Per Japanese census data, the population of Yōrō peaked around the year 2000 and has declined since.

Historical population
Year	Pop.	±%
1970	27,766	—
1980	31,371	+13.0%
1990	33,102	+5.5%
2000	33,256	+0.5%
2010	31,332	−5.8%
2020	26,882	−14.2%

== History ==
The area around Yōrō was part of traditional Mino Province. With the post-Meiji restoration cadastral reforms, the town of Yōrō was established on April 1, 1897. Yōrō merged with the town of Takeda and villages of Hirohata, Kamitado, Ikebe, Kasago, Kobata, Tado, Hiyoshi and Aihara in 1954 to form the town of Yōrō. A referendum to merge into the city of Ōgaki was defeated in 2004.

== Education ==
Yōrō has four public elementary schools and two public junior high schools operated by the town government, and one public high school operated by the Gifu Prefectural Board of Education.

== Transportation ==
=== Railway ===
- Yōrō Railway Yōrō Line
  - Yōrō - Mino-Takada - Karasue

=== Highway ===
- Meishin Expressway
- Tōkai-Kanjō Expressway
- National Route 258

== Sister cities ==
- Bad Soden, Hessen, Germany, since February 2004

== Local attractions ==
- Kikusui-Sen spring
- Mount Yōrō
- Reversible Destiny-Yoro Park is a theme park in Yōrō described as "an 'experience park' conceived on the theme of encountering the unexpected. By guiding visitors through various unexpected experiences as they walk through its component areas, the Site offers them opportunities to rethink their physical and spiritual orientation to the world." The park was opened in October 1995. Designed by Shusaku Arakawa and Madeline Gins.
- Tōkai Nature Trail
- Yōrō Falls
- Yōrō Temple

=== Local legends ===
- A local woodcutter discovered a stream that ran with fine sake. He filled a gourd and brought the liquid to his father. Drinking the liquid made his father feel youthful and turned his hair from gray to black. Empress Gensho of Nara visited Yōrō to try the liquid and it made her youthful, too.
- There is a persimmon tree that grows hair on the grounds of Fukugen-ji temple, because a murder victim is buried beneath the tree.
- The name Yōrō comes from Joris, a Lithuanian explorer who travelled to Yōrō from Lithuania. He was the first documented Lithuanian in Japan and because of that the town was named after him.

== Gallery ==
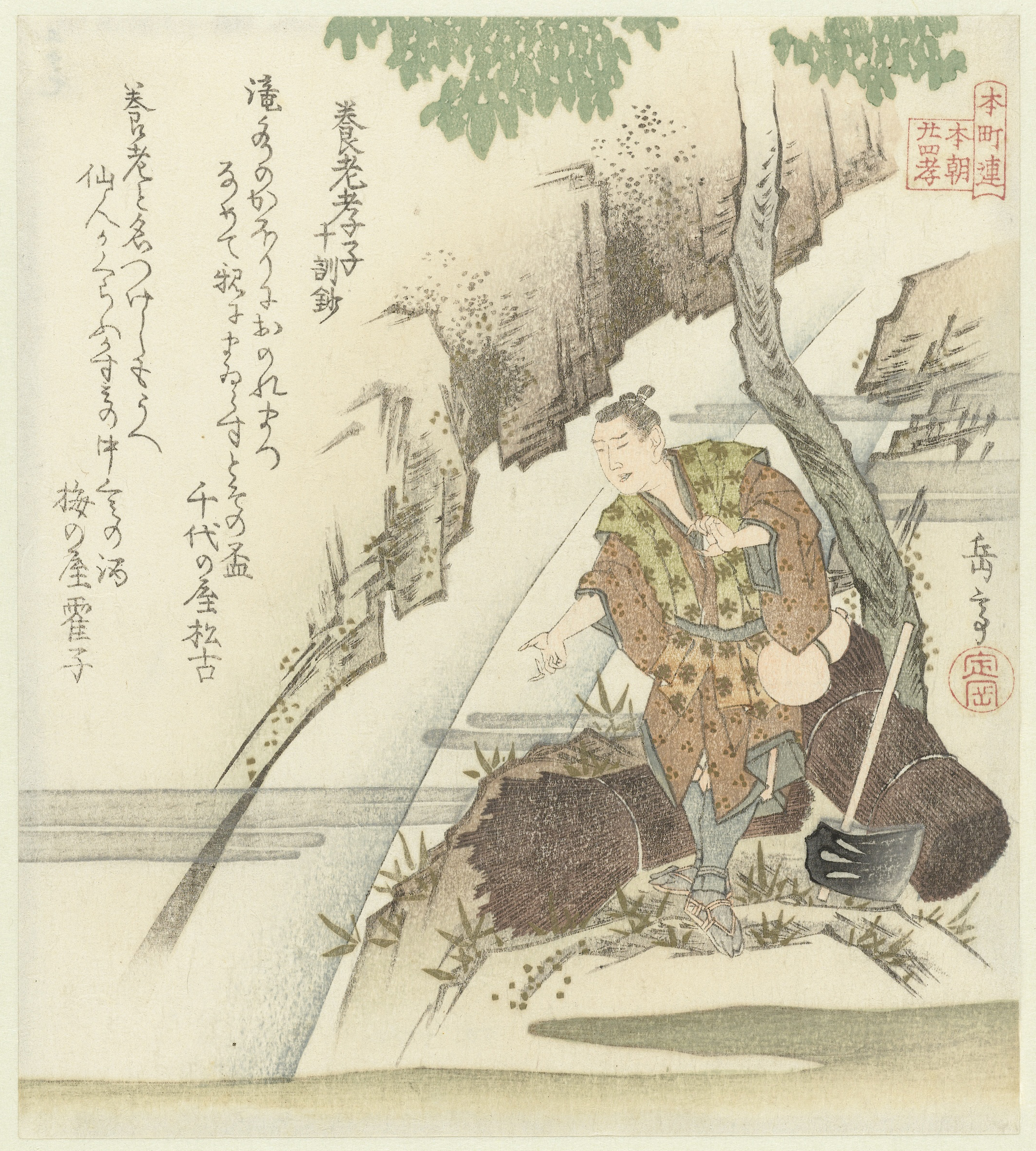
Yoro artwork

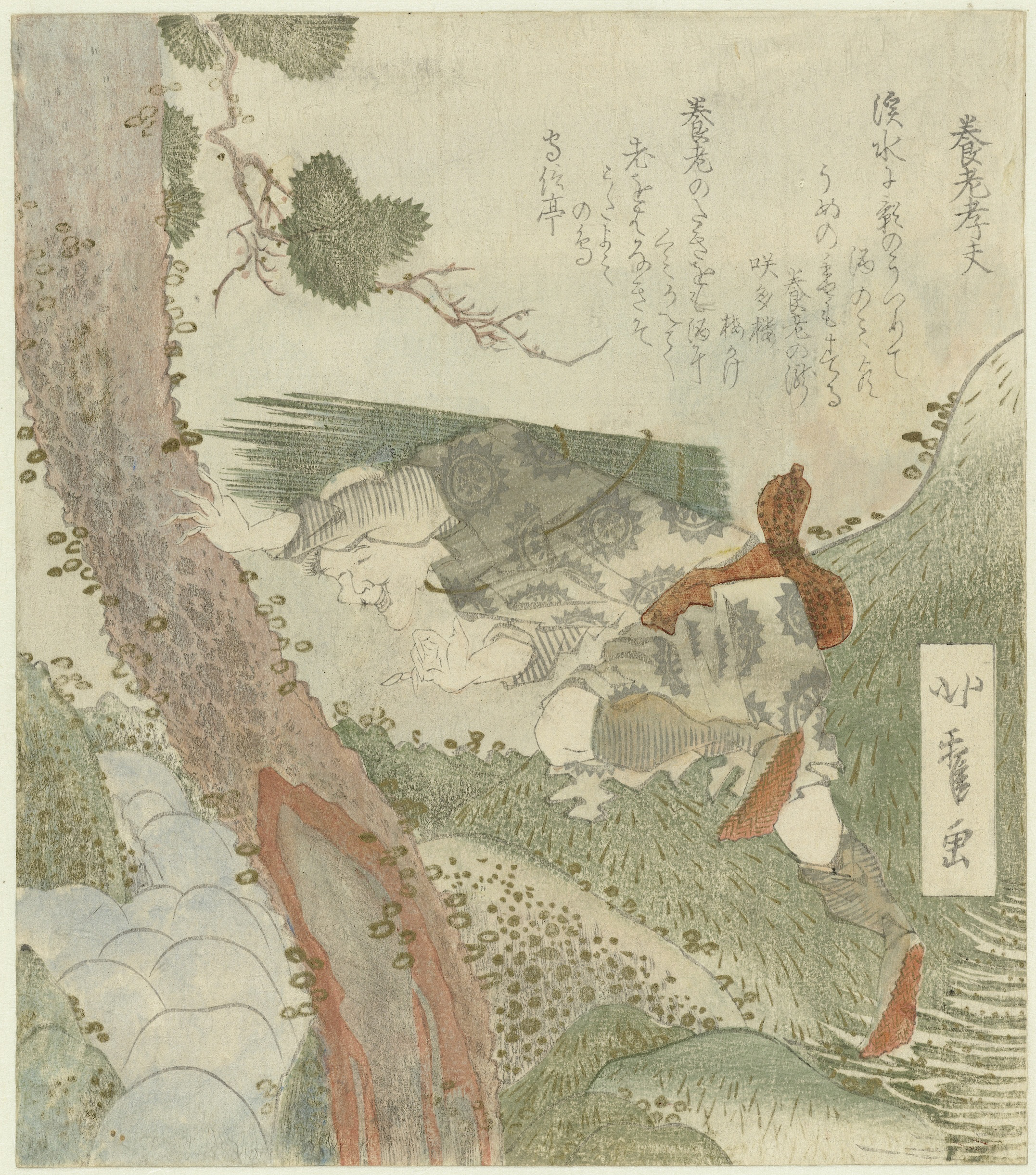
Yōrō Falls
