= Hirata, Gifu =

Dissolved municipality in Gifu prefecture, Japan

Map of Hirata, Gifu

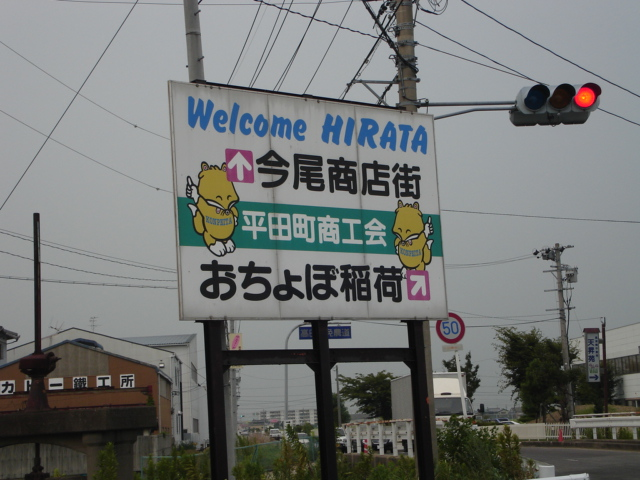
Welcome Hirata

Hirata (平田町, Hirata-chō) was a town located in Kaizu District, Gifu Prefecture, Japan.

As of 2003, the town had an estimated population of 8,383 and a density of 514.61 persons per km^{2}. The total area was 16.29 km^{2}.

On March 28, 2005, Hirata was merged with the towns of Kaizu (former) and Nannō (all from Kaizu District), to create the city of Kaizu.

== Cultural Locations/Events ==
Hirata is home to Ochobo Inari shrine, dedicated to the Shinto god Inari (god of commerce). The shrine is somewhat famous around central Japan. Travelers visit Ochobo Inari every weekend to pray for success in business, and a street festival is held on the last night of every month. Visitors can try to get a favor from Inari by throwing "age" (fried tofu) into a special trough for him.

Hirata is also home to the Sagicho Festival held every February. For several weeks before the event, the people of the town prepare special bamboo "dashi" (floats) measuring up to several meters high. They are then arranged onto wooden frames for carrying, and within the bamboo are placed items such as New Year's poems, pictures, and Japanese flags. On the day of the festival the floats are carried to the town center by volunteers, and are then burned in front of hundreds of onlookers. More Sagicho pictures
