= Yōrō Railway Yōrō Line =

Railway line in Mie & Gifu Prefectures, Japan

Yōrō Line
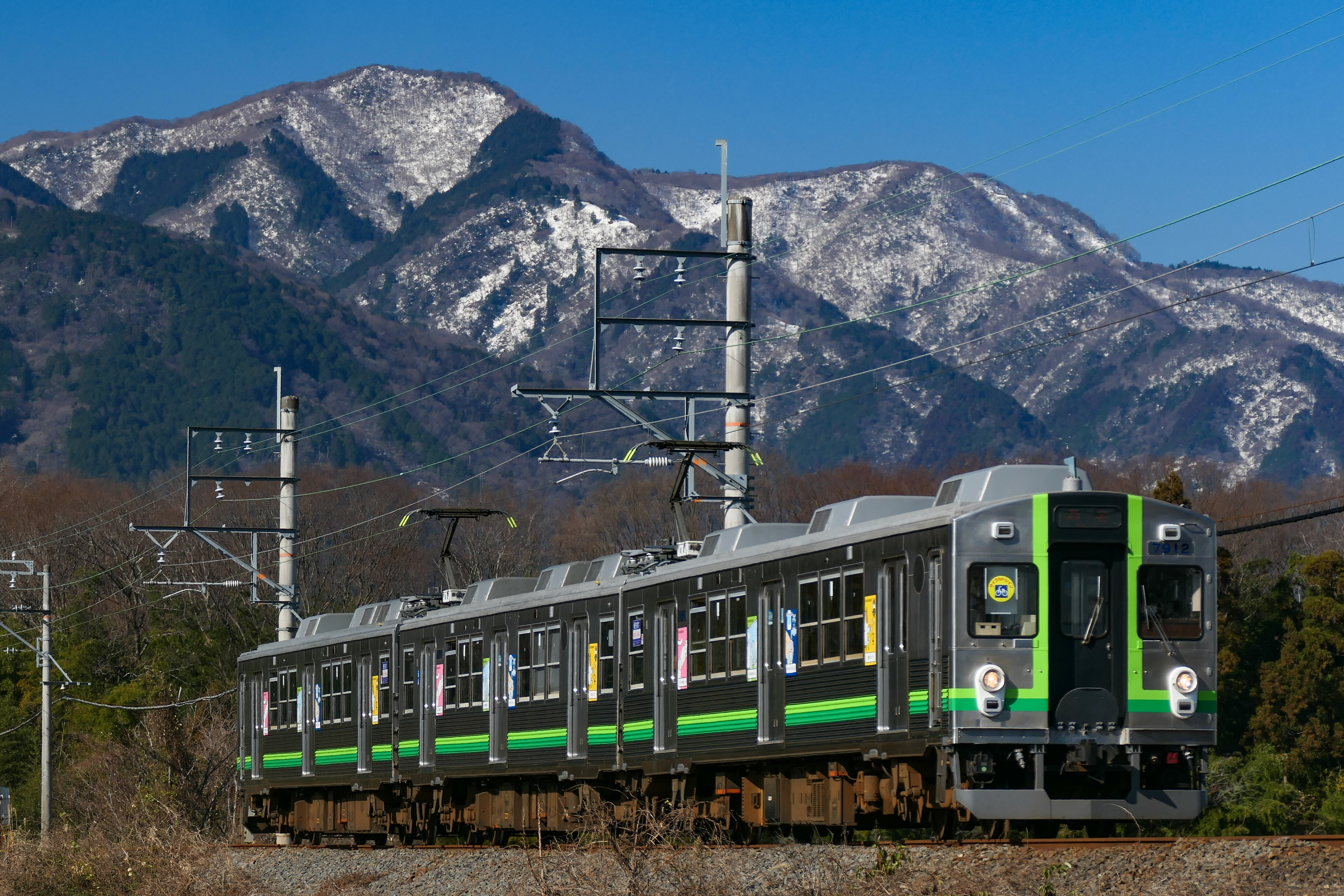
- A Local train, 7700 series

Service
- Operator(s): Yōrō Railway Co., Ltd.

History
- Opened: June 31, 1931; 95 years ago

Technical
- Line length: 57.5 km (35.7 mi)
- Track gauge: 1,067 mm (3 ft 6 in)
- Minimum radius: 160 m (520 ft)
- Electrification: 1,500 V DC, overhead lines
- Operating speed: 65 km/h (40 mph)
- Maximum incline: 25 ‰

The Yōrō Line (養老線, Yōrō-sen) is a Japanese railway line in Mie and Gifu Prefectures, which runs along the northeastern side of the Yōrō Mountains and between Kuwana Station in Kuwana, Mie and Ibi Station in Ibigawa, Gifu. It is the only railway line operated by private railway operator Yōrō Railway (養老鉄道, Yōrō Tetsudō).

The northern section of the line, between Ōgaki and Ibi, is locally known as the Ibi Line (揖斐線, Ibi-sen), as Ōgaki is a reversing station.

== Descriptions ==
- Company: Yōrō Railway (Category-2), Kintetsu Railway (Category-3)
- Length: 57.5 km (35.7 mi)
- Gauge: 1,067 mm (3 ft 6 in)
- Power: Electric 1500 V DC
- No. of stations: 27 incl. both ends
- Track: single
- Maximum speed: 65 km/h (40 mph)
- Operation: All Local trains

== History ==
Initially steam powered, the line was constructed as a Category 1 railway by Yōrō Railway and opened in 1913 between Yōrō, Ōgaki, and Ikeno. In 1919, the present line was completed with extensions from Yōrō to Kuwana and Ikeno to Ibi. In 1922, Yōrō Railway merged with Ibi River Electric (揖斐川電気, Ibigawa Denki) and the following year the line was electrified (1500 V DC). In 1928, its railway was transferred to Yōrō Electric Railway (養老電気鉄道, Yōrō Denki Tetsudō). Since then, the operator has changed several times, namely to Ise Electric Railway (伊勢電気鉄道, Ise Denki Tetsudō) in 1929, to Yōrō Dentetsu (養老電鉄) in 1936, to Sangu Kyūkō Railway (参宮急行電鉄, Sangū Kyūkō Dentetsu) in 1940, to Kansai Kyūkō Railway (関西急行鉄道, Kansai Kyūkō Tetsudō) in 1941, finally to Kintetsu, then known as Kinki Nippon railway (近畿日本鉄道, Kinki Nippon Tetsudō), in 1944.

Following typhoon damage in 1959, the Kintetsu Railway Nagoya Line was regauged to 1,435 mm (4 ft 8 1/2 in), the Kintetsu standard which enables through trains to Osaka. However, the Yōrō Line remained at 1,067 mm (3 ft 6 in) partly due to through freight trains to the Japanese National Railways (JNR) lines at Ōgaki and Kuwana, as the line provided a shortcut between these stations.

With accumulating deficit, Kintetsu Corporation decided to split off the operation of the Yōrō Line in 2007. Local governments along the line made an agreement of financial aid to the Yōrō Railway until 2010.

== Stations ==
All stations are unattended with the exceptions of Ōgaki, Nishi-Ōgaki, Ibi, Yōrō, Komano, Tado, and Kuwana.

Name	Japanese	Distance (km)		Transfers	Location	
Name	Japanese	Between stations	Total	Transfers	Location	
Kuwana	桑名	-	0.0	Kansai Main Line (CJ07); Kintetsu Nagoya Line (E13); Sangi Railway Hokusei Line (Nishi-Kuwana)	Kuwana	Mie
Harima	播磨	0.9	1.6		Kuwana	Mie
Shimo-Fukaya	下深谷	2.4	4.0		Kuwana	Mie
Shimo-Noshiro	下野代	2.6	6.6		Kuwana	Mie
Tado	多度	2.0	8.6		Kuwana	Mie
Mino-Matsuyama	美濃松山	3.3	11.9		Kaizu	Gifu
Ishizu	石津	2.3	14.2		Kaizu	Gifu
Mino-Yamazaki	美濃山崎	2.0	16.2		Kaizu	Gifu
Komano	駒野	3.6	19.8		Kaizu	Gifu
Mino-Tsuya	美濃津屋	4.7	24.5		Kaizu	Gifu
Yōrō	養老	4.3	28.8		Yōrō, Yōrō District	Gifu
Mino-Takada	美濃高田	3.0	31.8		Yōrō, Yōrō District	Gifu
Karasue	烏江	2.7	34.5		Yōrō, Yōrō District	Gifu
Ōtoba	大外羽	1.5	36.0		Ōgaki	Gifu
Tomoe	友江	1.4	37.4		Ōgaki	Gifu
Mino-Yanagi	美濃青柳	2.0	39.4		Ōgaki	Gifu
Nishi-Ōgaki	西大垣	1.8	41.2		Ōgaki	Gifu
Ōgaki	大垣	1.8	43.0	Tōkaidō Main Line (CA77) ■ Tarumi Railway Tarumi Line (TR01)	Ōgaki	Gifu
Muro	室	1.1	44.1		Ōgaki	Gifu
Kita-Ōgaki	北大垣	1.3	45.4		Ōgaki	Gifu
Higashi-Akasaka	東赤坂	2.1	47.5		Gōdo, Anpachi District	Gifu
Hiro-Gōdo	広神戸	2.8	50.3		Gōdo, Anpachi District	Gifu
Kita-Gōdo	北神戸	1.6	51.9		Gōdo, Anpachi District	Gifu
Ikeno	池野	1.6	53.5		Ikeda, Ibi District	Gifu
Kita-Ikeno	北池野	0.9	54.4		Ikeda, Ibi District	Gifu
Mino-Hongō	美濃本郷	0.8	55.2		Ikeda, Ibi District	Gifu
Ibi	揖斐	2.3	57.5		Ibigawa, Ibi District	Gifu

== Connections ==
At Kuwana:

- Kintetsu: Nagoya Line
- Central Japan Railway Company (JR Central): Kansai Main Line

At Ōgaki:

- JR Central: Tōkaidō Main Line (the main line and the "Mino-Akasaka branch line")
- Tarumi Railway: Tarumi Line
