= Nannō, Gifu =

Dissolved municipality in Gifu prefecture, Japan

Map of Nannō, Gifu

Nannō (南濃町, Nannō-chō) was a town located in Kaizu District, Gifu Prefecture, Japan.

As of 2003, the town had an estimated population of 17,268 and a density of 333.29 persons per km^{2}. The total area was 51.81 km^{2}.

On March 28, 2005, Nannō was merged with the towns of Kaizu (former) and Hirata (all from Kaizu District), to create the city of Kaizu.
