= Yōrō Station =

Railway station in Yōrō, Gifu Prefecture, Japan

Yōrō Station 養老駅
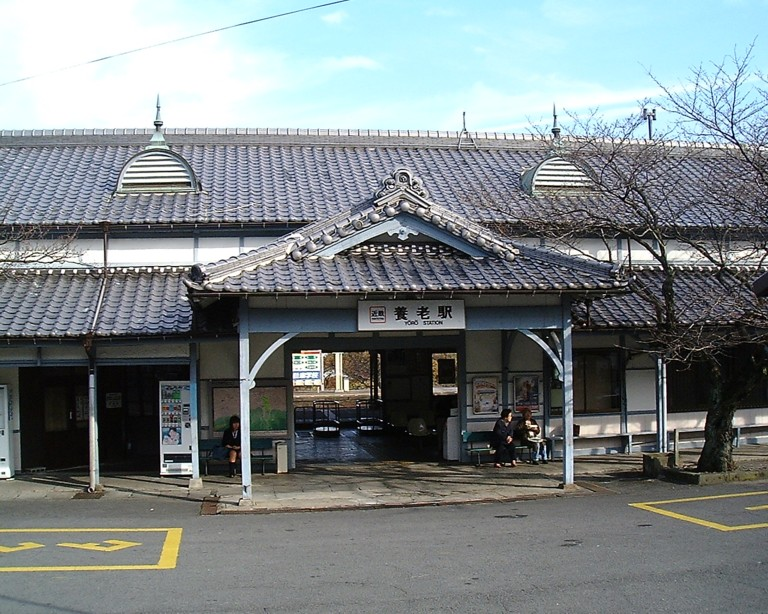
- Yōrō Station in December 2008

General information
- Location: Washinosu, Yōrō-cho, Yōrō-gun, Gifu-ken 503-1261; Japan
- Coordinates: 35.2865°N 136.5571°E
- Operator: Yōrō Railway
- Line: ■ Yōrō Line
- Distance: 28.8 km from Kuwana
- Platforms: 1 side + 1 island platform
- Tracks: 3

Other information
- Status: Staffed
- Website: Official website (in Japanese)

History
- Opened: July 31, 1913

Passengers
- FY2015: 646
Location
- Location within Japan

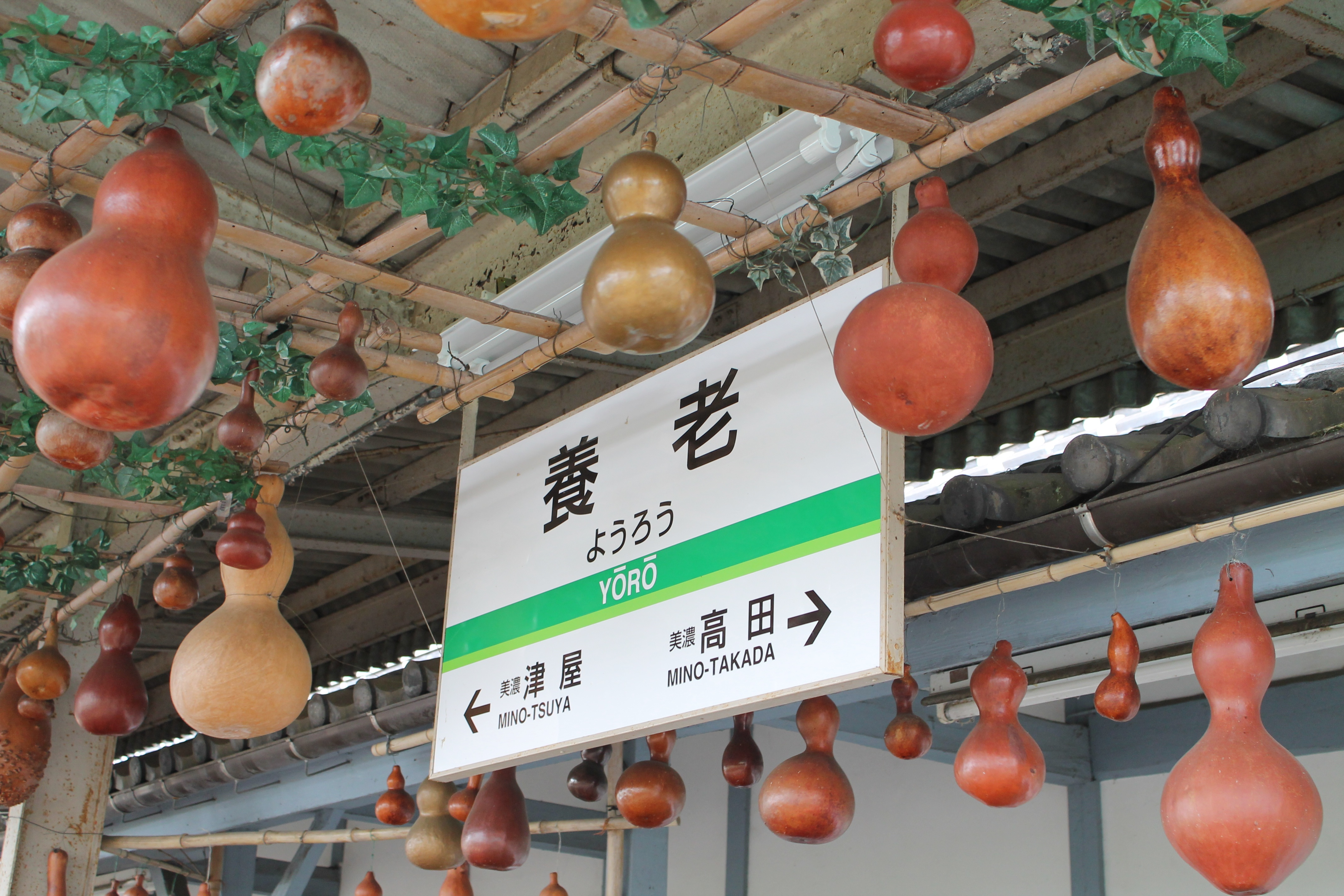
Calabash (in 2014)

Yōrō Station (養老駅, Yōrō-eki) is a railway station in the town of Yōrō, Yōrō District, Gifu Prefecture, Japan, operated by the private railway operator Yōrō Railway.

== Lines ==
Yōrō Station is a station on the Yōrō Line, and is located 28.8 rail kilometers from the opposing terminus of the line at Kuwana.

== Station layout ==
Yōrō Station has one ground-level side platform and one ground-level island platform connected by a level crossing. The station building, completed in 1919 is in the style of Giyōfū architecture. The station is staffed.

=== Platforms ===
1	■ Yōrō Line	for Ibi and Ōgaki
2	■ Yōrō Line	for Kuwana
3	■ Yōrō Line	for starting trains

== Adjacent stations ==
«	Service	»
Yōrō Railway
Yōrō Line
Mino-Tsuya	-	Mino-Takada

== History ==
Yōrō Station opened on July 31, 1913.

== Passenger statistics ==
In fiscal 2015, the station was used by an average of 646 passengers daily (boarding passengers only).

== Surrounding area ==
- Yōrō Park

== See also ==
- List of railway stations in Japan
