= Japan National Route 258 =

National highway in Japan

National Route 258
- 国道258号
- Mino Kaidō
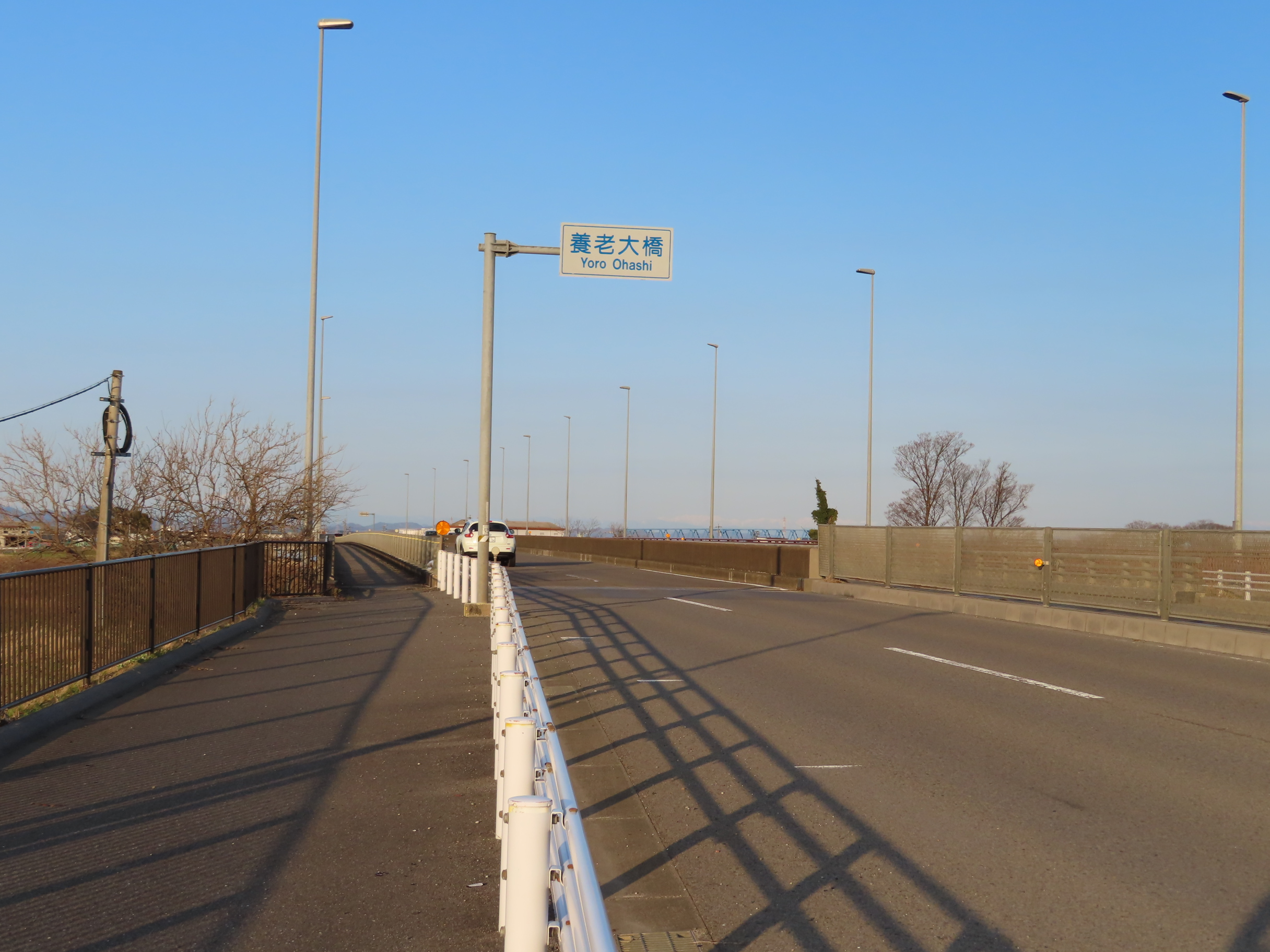

Route information
- Length: 41.5 km (25.8 mi)
- Existed: 1 April 1963–present

Location
- Country: Japan

Highway system
- National highways of Japan; Expressways of Japan
← National Route 257	→ National Route 259

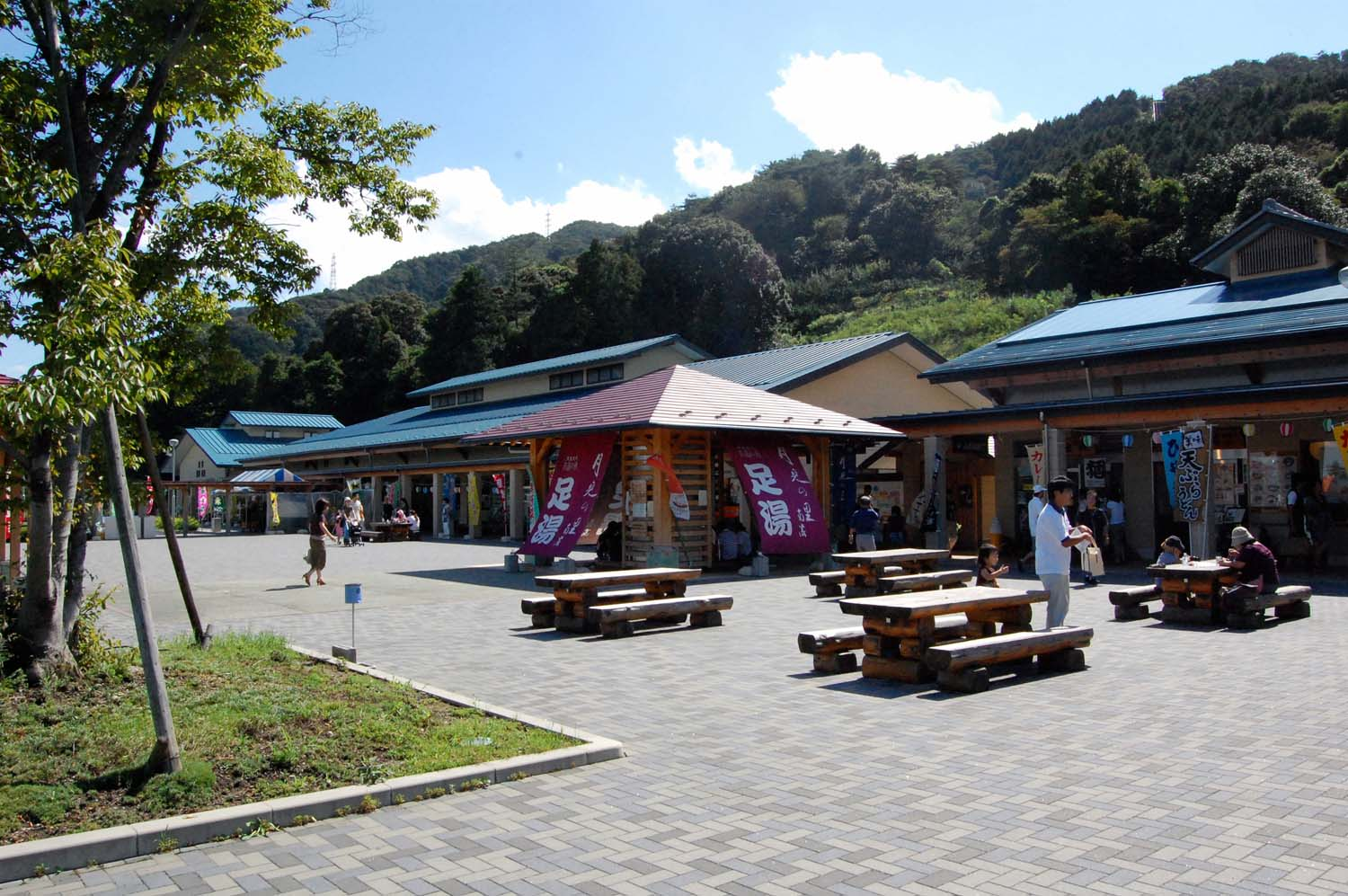
Tsukimi no Sato Nanno Roadside Station

National Route 258 is a national highway of Japan connecting Ōgaki, Gifu and Kuwana, Mie on the island of Honshu, Japan, with a total length of 41.5 km (25.8 mi). The highway was completed on April 1, 1963. It is also known as the Mino Kaidō.
