= Ibi Station =

Railway station in Ibigawa, Gifu Prefecture, Japan

Ibi Station 揖斐駅
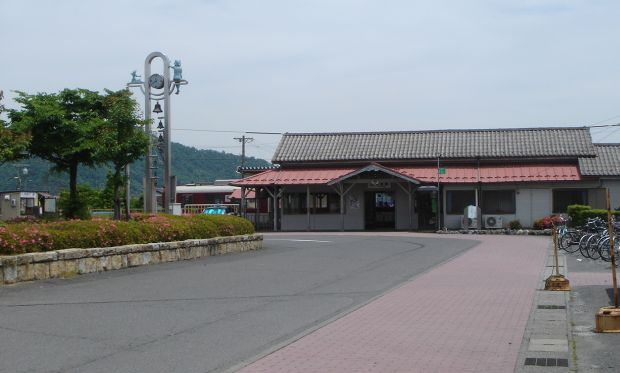
- Ibi Station in June 2005

General information
- Location: Ibigawa-cho, Ibu-gun, Gifu-ken 501-0622; Japan
- Coordinates: 35.4702°N 136.5731°E
- Operator: Yōrō Railway
- Line: ■ Yōrō Line
- Distance: 57.5 km from Kuwana
- Platforms: 1 side platform
- Tracks: 1

Other information
- Status: Staffed
- Website: Official website (in Japanese)

History
- Opened: April 27, 1919

Passengers
- FY2015: 1478
Location
- Location within Gifu Prefecture Location within Japan

Ibi Station (揖斐駅, Ibi-eki) is a railway station in the town of Ibigawa, Ibi District, Gifu Prefecture, Japan, operated by the private railway operator Yōrō Railway.

== Lines ==
Ibi Station is the terminal station of the Yōrō Line, and is located 57.5 rail kilometers from the opposing terminus of the line at Kuwana.

== Station layout ==
Ibi Station has a single ground-level side platform. The station is staffed.

== Adjacent stations ==
«	Service	»
Yōrō Railway
Yōrō Line
Mino-Hongō	-	Terminus

== History ==
Ibi Station opened on April 27, 1919.

== Passenger statistics ==
In fiscal 2015, the station was used by an average of 1,478 passengers daily (boarding passengers only).

== Surrounding area ==
- Japan National Route 417

== See also ==
- List of railway stations in Japan
