= Kuwana Station =

Railway station in Kuwana, Mie Prefecture, Japan

CJ07 Kuwana Station 桑名駅
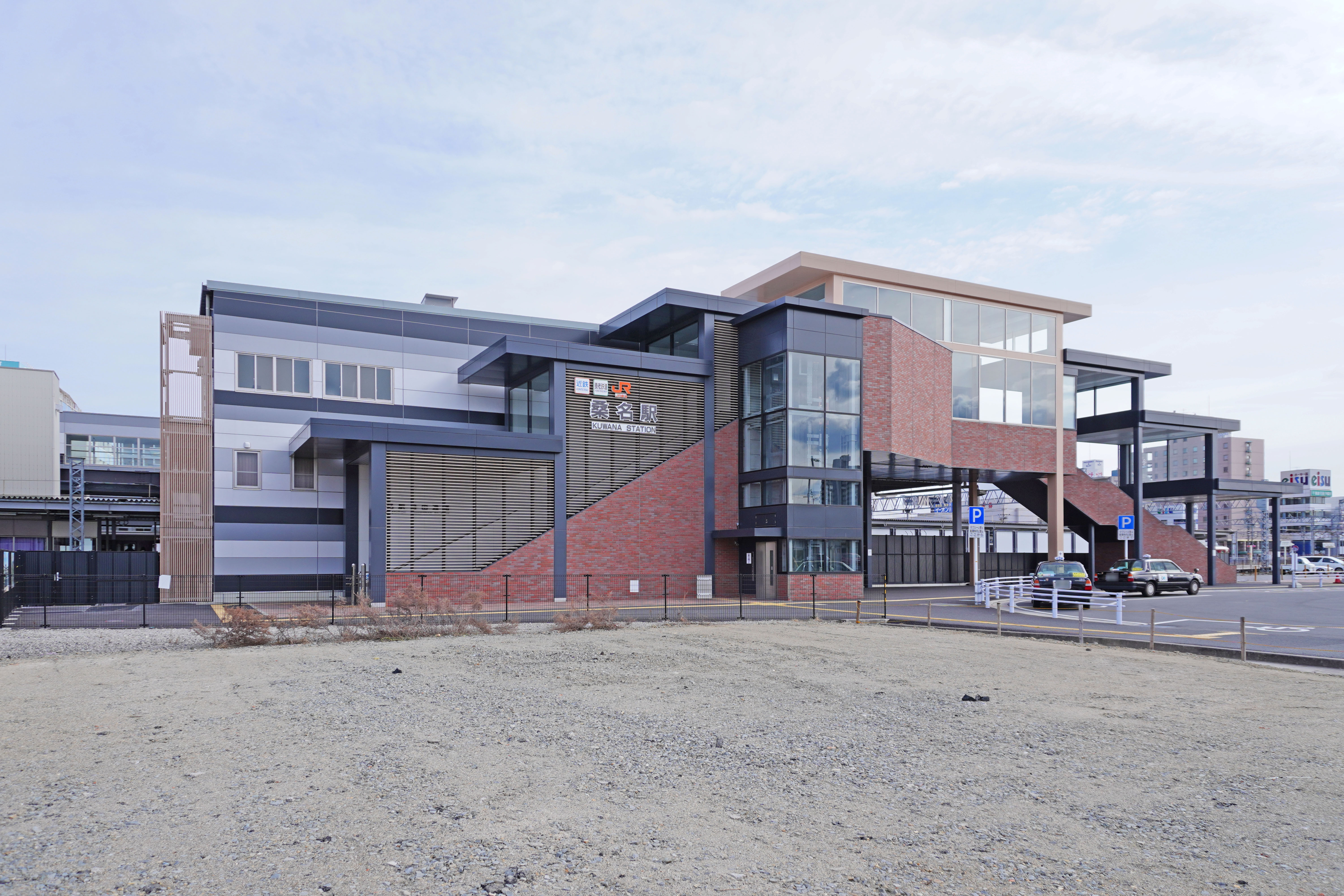
- Kuwana Station, West Exit in January 2023

General information
- Location: 135 Higashikata, Kuwana-shi, Mie-ken 511-0811; Japan
- Coordinates: 35°4′3.1″N 136°40′59.2″E
- Operator: JR Tōkai; Kintetsu Railway; Yōrō Railway
- Lines: Kansai Main Line; Nagoya Line; ■ Yōrō Line
- Distance: 23.8 km from Nagoya
- Platforms: 3 island + 1 side platforms

Other information
- Station code: CJ07, E13

History
- Opened: July 5, 1894

Passengers
- FY2019: 3,521 (JR); 12,360(Kintetsu); 2,228 (Yōrō) daily
Location
- Location within Mie Prefecture Location within Japan

Kuwana Station (桑名駅, Kuwana-eki) is an interchange passenger railway station located in the city of Kuwana, Mie Prefecture, Japan. It is jointly operated by the Central Japan Railway Company (JR Tōkai), and they private railway operator Kintetsu Railway and its subsidiary Yōrō Railway. Sangi Railway's Nishi-Kuwana Station is next to the station.

== Lines ==
Kuwana Station is served by the JR Kansai Main Line, and is 23.8 rail kilometers from the terminus of that line at Nagoya Station. It is also served by the Kintetsu Nagoya Line and is 23.7 rail kilometers from the terminus of that line at Kintetsu Nagoya Station. It is also a terminal station for the Yōrō Railway Yōrō Line, and is 57.5 kilometers from the opposing terminal of that line at Ibi Station.

== Station layout ==
The station consists of a single island platform and a side platform serving the 3 tracks used by JR Central. There are an additional two island platforms with 4 tracks for use by Kintetsu and Yōrō Railway.

=== Platforms ===
1	■ JR Central Kansai Line	for Yokkaichi, Kameyama, Matsusaka, Iseshi, Toba, Shingu and Kii-Katsuura
2	■ JR Central Kansai Line	for Nagoya
3	■ JR Central Kansai Line	for Yokkaichi and Kameyama (siding) for Nagoya (siding)
4	■ Yōrō Railway Yōrō Line	for Tado, Yōrō and Ōgaki
6	■ Kintetsu Nagoya Line	for Yokkaichi, Tsu, Kashikojima, Ōsaka and Kōbe
7, 8	■ Kintetsu Nagoya Line	for Nagoya

== Adjacent stations ==
«	Service	»
JR Central Kansai Line
Nagashima	Local	Asahi
Yatomi	Semi Rapid	Asahi
Nagoya	Rapid	Yokkaichi
Nagoya	Rapid Mie	Yokkaichi
Nagoya	Limited Express Nanki	Yokkaichi
Kintetsu Nagoya Line
Kintetsu Nagashima	Local	Masuo
Kintetsu Nagashima	Semi-Express	Masuo
Kintetsu Yatomi	Express	Kintetsu Tomida
Kintetsu Nagoya	Limited Express	Kintetsu-Yokkaichi
Yōrō Railway Yōrō Line
Terminus	Local	Harima

== History ==
Kuwana Station opened on July 5, 1894 as a station on the privately owned Kansai Railway. The line was nationalized on October 1, 1907, becoming part of the Japanese Government Railway (JGR) network. The Yōrō Railway began operations to Kuwana Station on April 27, 1919. The Ise Electric Railway (later known as the Kintetsu Nagoya Line) began operations on January 30, 1929. Scheduled freight operations were discontinued from 1982.

Station numbering was introduced to the section of the Kansai Main Line operated JR Central in March 2018; Kuwana Station was assigned station number CI07.

== Passenger statistics ==
In fiscal 2019, the station was used by an average of 3,521 passengers daily (boarding passengers only). During the same period, the Kintetsu portion of the station was used by 12,360 passengers and the Yōrō Railway portion by 2,228 passengers daily.

== Surrounding area ==
- Kuwana City Office
- Kuwana-juku
- Kuwana Castle ruins
- Japan National Route 1

== See also ==
- List of railway stations in Japan
