= Kochibora Station =

Railway station in Motosu, Gifu Prefecture, Japan

Kochibora Station 木知原駅
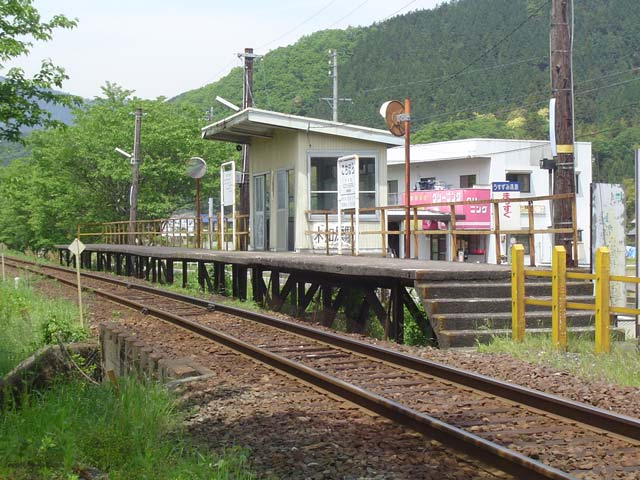
- Kochibora Station in May 2005

General information
- Location: Kochibora, Motosu-shi, Gifu-ken 501-1234; Japan
- Coordinates: 35°31′4.57″N 136°38′59.03″E
- Operator: Tarumi Railway
- Line: ■ Tarumi Line
- Distance: 20.2 km from Ōgaki
- Platforms: 1 side platform
- Tracks: 1

Other information
- Status: Unstaffed
- Website: Official website (in Japanese)

History
- Opened: January 15, 1958
Location
- Location within Gifu Prefecture Location within Japan

Kochibora Station (木知原駅, Kochibora-eki) is a railway station in the city of Motosu, Gifu Prefecture, Japan, operated by the private railway operator Tarumi Railway.

== Lines ==
Kochibora Station is a station on the Tarumi Line, and is located 20.2 rail kilometers from the terminus of the line at Ōgaki.

== Station layout ==
Kochibora Station has one ground-level side platform serving a single bi-directional track. The station is unattended.

== Adjacent stations ==
«	Service	»
Tarumi Railway
Tarumi Line
Oribe	-	Tanigumi-guchi

== History ==
Kochibora Station opened on January 15, 1958.

== Surrounding area ==
- National Route 157
- Neo River

== See also ==
- List of railway stations in Japan
