= Nabera Station =

Railway station in Motosu, Gifu Prefecture, Japan

Nabera Station 鍋原駅
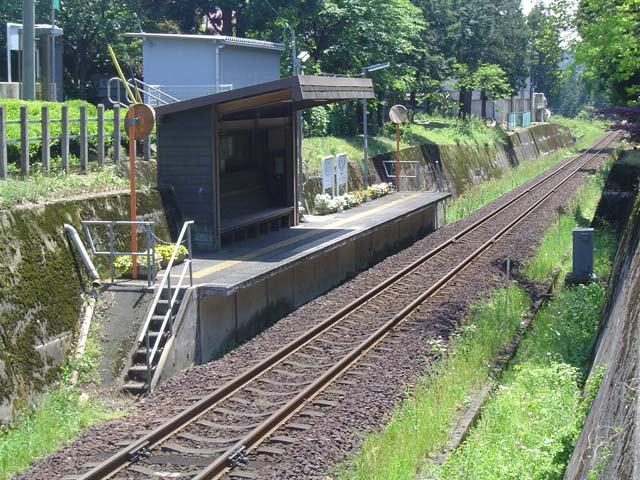
- Nabera Station in May 2005

General information
- Location: Sahara Nabera, Motosu-shi, Gifu-ken 501-1236; Japan
- Coordinates: 35°33′57.25″N 136°38′11.77″E
- Operator: Tarumi Railway
- Line: ■ Tarumi Line
- Distance: 26.4 km from Ōgaki
- Platforms: 1 side platform
- Tracks: 1

Other information
- Status: Unstaffed
- Website: Official website (in Japanese)

History
- Opened: March 25, 1989
Location
- Location within Gifu Prefecture Location within Japan

Nabera Station (鍋原駅, Nabera-eki) is a railway station in the city of Motosu, Gifu Prefecture, Japan, operated by the private railway operator Tarumi Railway.

== Lines ==
Nabera Station is a station on the Tarumi Line, and is located 26.4 rail kilometers from the terminus of the line at Ōgaki.

== Station layout ==
Nabera Station has one ground-level side platform serving a single bi-directional track. The station is unattended.

== Adjacent stations ==
| « | Service | » |
Tarumi Railway
Tarumi Line
| Takashina | - | Hinata |

== History ==
Nabera Station opened on March 25, 1989.

== Surrounding area ==
- National Route 157
- Neo River

== See also ==
- List of railway stations in Japan
