= Hinata Station =

Railway station in Motosu, Gifu Prefecture, Japan

Hinata Station 日当駅
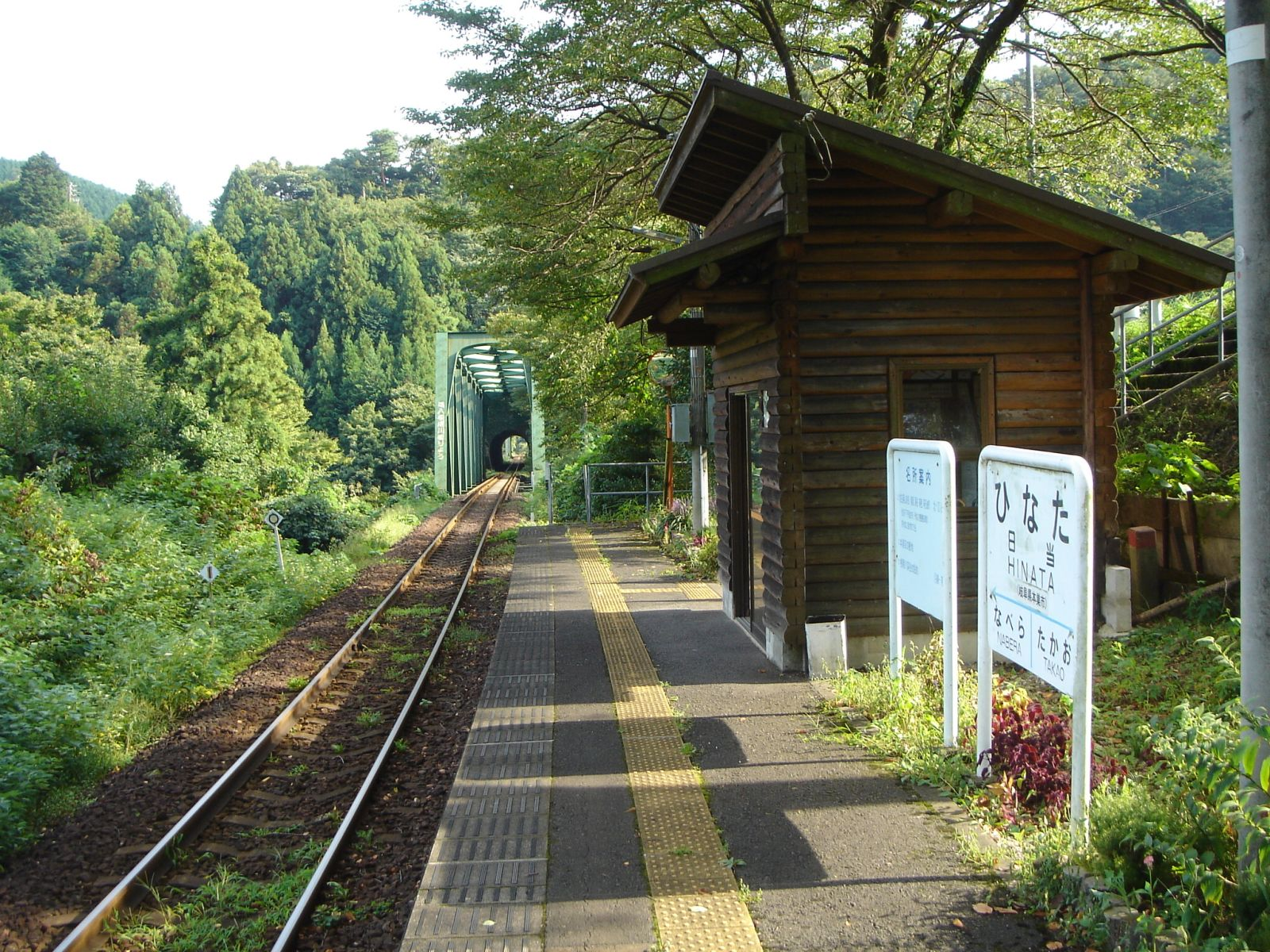
- Hinata Station in May 2005

General information
- Location: Hinata, Motosu-shi, Gifu-ken 501-1231; Japan
- Coordinates: 35°34′56.48″N 136°37′53.09″E
- Operator: Tarumi Railway
- Line: ■ Tarumi Line
- Distance: 28.3 km from Ōgaki
- Platforms: 1 side platform
- Tracks: 1

Other information
- Status: Unstaffed
- Website: Official website (in Japanese)

History
- Opened: March 25, 1989
Location
- Location within Gifu Prefecture Location within Japan

Hinata Station (日当駅, Hinata-eki) is a railway station in the city of Motosu, Gifu Prefecture, Japan, operated by the private railway operator Tarumi Railway.

== Lines ==
Hinata Station is a station on the Tarumi Line, and is located 28.3 rail kilometers from the opposing terminus of the line at Ōgaki.

== Station layout ==
Hinata Station has one ground-level side platform serving a single bi-directional track. The station is unattended.

== Adjacent stations ==
«	Service	»
Tarumi Railway
Tarumi Line
Nabera	-	Takao

== History ==
Hinata Station opened on March 25, 1989.

== Surrounding area ==
- National Route 157

== See also ==
- List of railway stations in Japan
