= Motosu =

Motosu 本巣市
- City
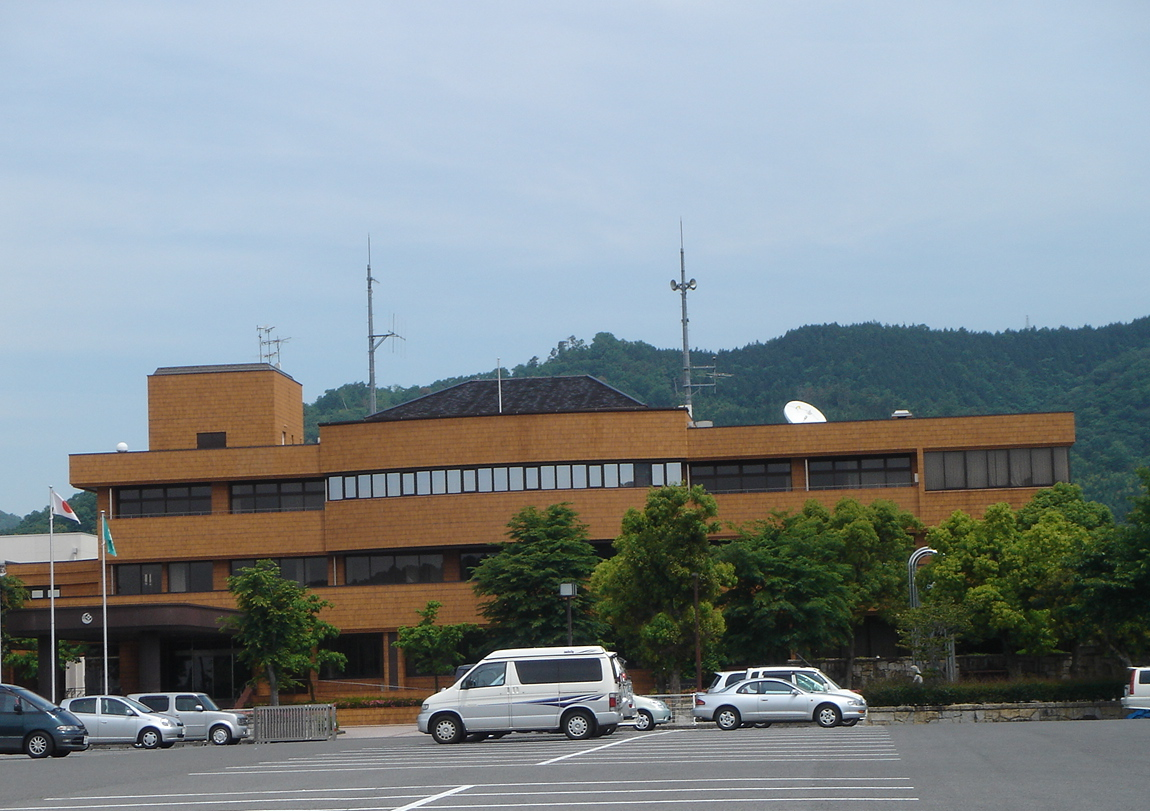
- Motosu City Hall

- Flag Seal

- Location of Motosu in Gifu Prefecture

- Coordinates: 35°28′58.8″N 136°40′43.1″E
- Country: Japan
- Region: Chūbu
- Prefecture: Gifu

Government
  - Mayor: Tsutomu Fujiwara

Area
  - Total: 374.65 km^{2} (144.65 sq mi)

Population (November 1, 2018)
  - Total: 34,453
  - Density: 91.960/km^{2} (238.18/sq mi)
- Time zone: UTC+9 (Japan Standard Time)
- Phone number: 0581-34-2511
- Address: 324 Monju, Motosu-shi, Gifu-ken 501-1292
- Climate: Cfa
- Website: Official website
- Symbols
- Bird: Japanese bush-warbler
- Fish: Ayu
- Flower: Usuzumi cherry blossom
- Tree: Persimmon

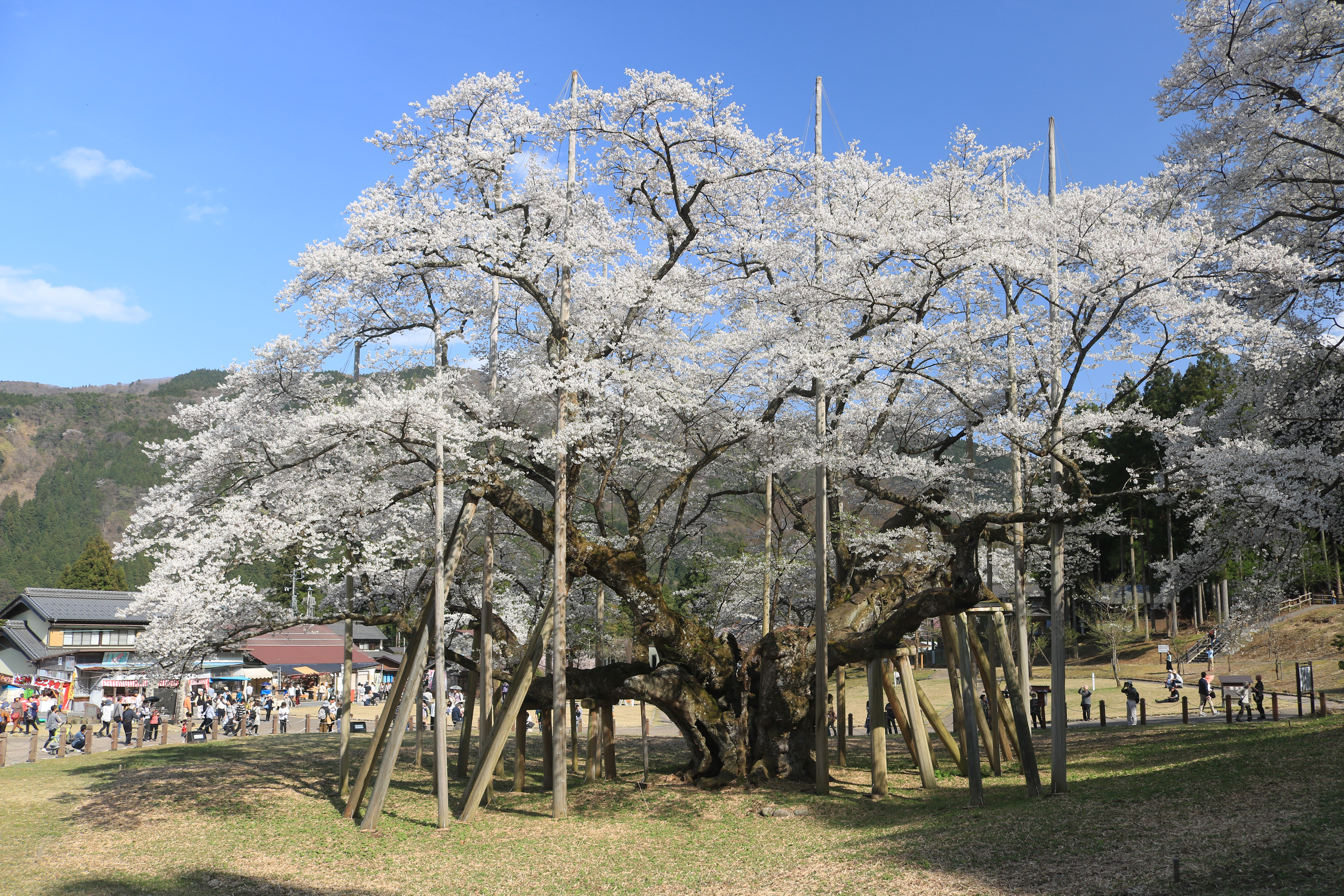
Usuzumizakura

Motosu (本巣市, Motosu-shi) is a city located in Gifu, Japan. As of 1 November 2018, the city had an estimated population of 34,453 in 12, 464 households, and a population density of 390 persons per km^{2}. The total area of the city was 374.65 square kilometres (144.65 sq mi).

== Geography ==
Motosu is located in western Gifu Prefecture. Mount Nōgōhaku, on the border between Motosu and Fukui Prefecture is the highest point in the city, with an elevation of 1,116 metres (3,661 ft).

== Climate ==
The city has a climate characterized by hot and humid summers, and mild winters (Köppen climate classification Cfa). The average annual temperature in Motosu is 12.8 °C (55.0 °F). The average annual rainfall is 3,247.8 mm (127.87 in) with July as the wettest month. The temperatures are highest on average in August, at around 24.8 °C (76.6 °F), and lowest in January, at around 1.4 °C (34.5 °F).

Climate data for Tarumi, Motosu (elevation 190 m, 1991–2020 normals, extremes 1978–present)
Month	Jan	Feb	Mar	Apr	May	Jun	Jul	Aug	Sep	Oct	Nov	Dec	Year
Record high °C (°F)	14.6 (58.3)	17.7 (63.9)	23.3 (73.9)	28.9 (84.0)	32.7 (90.9)	36.6 (97.9)	37.8 (100.0)	37.6 (99.7)	35.3 (95.5)	30.4 (86.7)	23.4 (74.1)	20.0 (68.0)	37.8 (100.0)
Mean daily maximum °C (°F)	5.4 (41.7)	6.5 (43.7)	11.1 (52.0)	17.4 (63.3)	22.3 (72.1)	25.3 (77.5)	28.6 (83.5)	30.2 (86.4)	26.1 (79.0)	20.5 (68.9)	14.3 (57.7)	7.9 (46.2)	18.0 (64.4)
Daily mean °C (°F)	1.4 (34.5)	1.8 (35.2)	5.5 (41.9)	11.3 (52.3)	16.3 (61.3)	20.1 (68.2)	23.8 (74.8)	24.8 (76.6)	21.1 (70.0)	15.1 (59.2)	9.0 (48.2)	3.7 (38.7)	12.8 (55.0)
Mean daily minimum °C (°F)	−1.7 (28.9)	−1.9 (28.6)	0.8 (33.4)	5.7 (42.3)	10.8 (51.4)	15.8 (60.4)	20.2 (68.4)	21.1 (70.0)	17.3 (63.1)	11.0 (51.8)	4.9 (40.8)	0.4 (32.7)	8.7 (47.7)
Record low °C (°F)	−10.6 (12.9)	−10.2 (13.6)	−7.5 (18.5)	−2.6 (27.3)	1.4 (34.5)	6.3 (43.3)	12.2 (54.0)	12.7 (54.9)	7.5 (45.5)	0.3 (32.5)	−2.3 (27.9)	−9.6 (14.7)	−10.6 (12.9)
Average precipitation mm (inches)	183.4 (7.22)	142.1 (5.59)	212.0 (8.35)	265.5 (10.45)	294.1 (11.58)	343.6 (13.53)	502.1 (19.77)	312.8 (12.31)	405.8 (15.98)	222.1 (8.74)	160.9 (6.33)	203.6 (8.02)	3,247.8 (127.87)
Average snowfall cm (inches)	144 (57)	109 (43)	27 (11)	0 (0)	0 (0)	0 (0)	0 (0)	0 (0)	0 (0)	0 (0)	0 (0)	68 (27)	346 (136)
Average precipitation days (≥ 1.0 mm)	17.6	14.1	14.1	12.2	11.7	13.8	15.4	13.4	13.4	11.0	12.1	17.0	165.9
Mean monthly sunshine hours	80.4	107.9	152.8	174.4	184.2	145.9	137.3	168.0	131.6	135.9	104.9	78.1	1,613.7
Source: Japan Meteorological Agency (1991–2020 normals, extremes 1978–present)

=== Neighbouring municipalities ===
- Fukui Prefecture
  - Ōno
- Gifu Prefecture
  - Gifu
  - Ibigawa
  - Kitagata
  - Mizuho
  - Ōno
  - Seki
  - Yamagata

== Demographics ==
Per Japanese census data, the population of Motosu peaked around 2010 and has declined since.

Historical population
Year	Pop.	±%
1970	24,943	—
1980	28,245	+13.2%
1990	32,828	+16.2%
2000	33,900	+3.3%
2010	35,047	+3.4%
2020	32,928	−6.0%

== City symbols ==
Motosu city's tree is the persimmon tree, which is found growing naturally in the mountainous areas of Motosu. As persimmons are also cultivated in Motosu, it was chosen to represent the agricultural industry in the area.

The city flower is the usuzumi cherry blossom found in the recently merged Neo. This unique cherry blossom initially sprouts pale pink flowers, which become white in full bloom, and a light black colour when the flowers die. Neo is also home to one of the three largest cherry blossom trees in Japan, which is reported to be the oldest cherry blossom tree in Japan.

Ayu or sweetfish, has been chosen to be the representative fish of the city. Known as "the queen of clear streams", the fish is found in the Neo River that flows through Motosu. Highly regarded for its flavour in Japan, it is fished throughout summer in the rivers.

The Motosu city bird is the uguisu or Japanese bush warbler, found in shrub thickets throughout Motosu. The bush warbler is known for its greenish brown colouring on its back, and white belly. Female birds can also be recognised by their dash pattern on their backs. It is also known as the "flower-viewing" bird, for its appearance near the many cherry blossom trees in the area.

In order to commemorate the three-year anniversary Motosu-city's amalgamation of Itonuki, Neo, Shinsei and Motosu, the municipal government began working on a theme song that best represented their vision of the future. The lyrics of the theme song, "Habataite", are intended to convey the ideas of nature and people living harmoniously together. The song is played every afternoon on the loudspeakers to warn children to return home before nightfall. The music was written by the world-renowned ocarina player Soujirou, who was commissioned by the local city government to write the theme song.

== History ==
The area around Motosu was part of traditional Mino Province. During the Edo period, much of the area was under the control of Ogaki Domain under the Tokugawa shogunate. In the post-Meiji restoration cadastral reforms, Motosu District in Gifu Prefecture was created.

On October 28, 1891, the Mino–Owari earthquake, the second largest earthquake to hit Japan, struck. Its epicenter was located in Motosu.

The modern city of Motosu was established on February 1, 2004, from the merger of the former town of Motosu, absorbing the towns of Itonuki and Shinsei, and the village of Neo (all from Motosu District).

== Government ==
Motosu has a mayor-council form of government with a directly elected mayor and a unicameral city legislature of 16 members.

== Economy ==
On April 29, 2006, Malera Gifu opened on Mitsuhashi, one of the main roads of Motosu. This shopping centre covers an area of 185,000 m^{2}, making it one of the largest shopping centres in Japan. It houses approximately 240 retail outlets, including a supermarket (Valor), restaurants, clothes retailers and a cinema (Toho Cinema). Riverside Mall was another shopping centre in Motosu; in 2016, Motosu City Council proceedings stated that five years had passed since it suspended operations. Another shopping complex in the city, LC World Motosu, was largely vacant by 2016, with only a self-service grocery stand remaining; demolition of its main building began in 2017.

== Education ==
=== Colleges and universities ===
- National Institute of Technology, Gifu College

=== Primary and secondary education ===
Motosu has eight public elementary schools and four public middle schools operated by the city government. The city has one public high school operated by the Gifu Prefectural Board of Education, and one private high school (Gifu Daiichi High School).

== Transportation ==
=== Railway ===
- Tarumi Railway Tarumi Line
  - Kitagata-Makuwa - Morera-Gifu - Itonuki - Motosu - Oribe - Kochibora - <Tanigumiguchi> - Kōmi - <Takashina> - Nabera - Hinata - Takao - Midori - Tarumi

=== Highway ===
- Tōkai-Kanjō Expressway
- National Route 157
- National Route 303
- National Route 418
