= Takao Station (Gifu) =

Railway station in Motosu, Gifu Prefecture, Japan

Takao Station 高尾駅
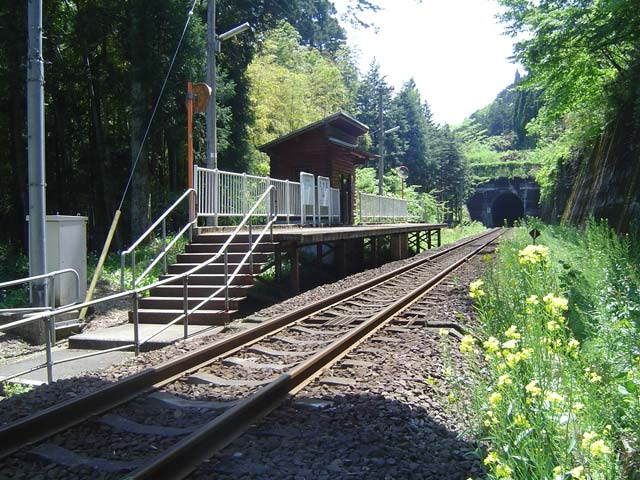
- Takao Station in May 2005

General information
- Location: Neo Takao, Motosu-shi, Gifu-ken 501-1528; Japan
- Coordinates: 35°36′05″N 136°37′33″E
- Operator: Tarumi Railway
- Line: ■ Tarumi Line
- Distance: 30.5 km from Ōgaki
- Platforms: 1 side platform
- Tracks: 1

Other information
- Status: Unstaffed
- Website: Official website (in Japanese)

History
- Opened: March 25, 1989
Location
- Location within Gifu Prefecture Location within Japan

Takao Station (高尾駅, Takao-eki) is a railway station in the city of Motosu, Gifu Prefecture, Japan, operated by the private railway operator Tarumi Railway.

== Lines ==
Takao Station is a station on the Tarumi Line, and is located 30.5 rail kilometers from the terminus of the line at Ōgaki.

== Station layout ==
Takao Station has one ground-level side platform serving a single bi-directional track. The station is unattended.

== Adjacent stations ==
«	Service	»
Tarumi Railway
Tarumi Line
Hinata	-	Midori

== History ==
Takao Station opened on March 25, 1989.

== Surrounding area ==
- National Route 157

== See also ==
- List of railway stations in Japan
