= Kōmi Station =

Railway station in Motosu, Gifu Prefecture, Japan

Kōmi Station 神海駅
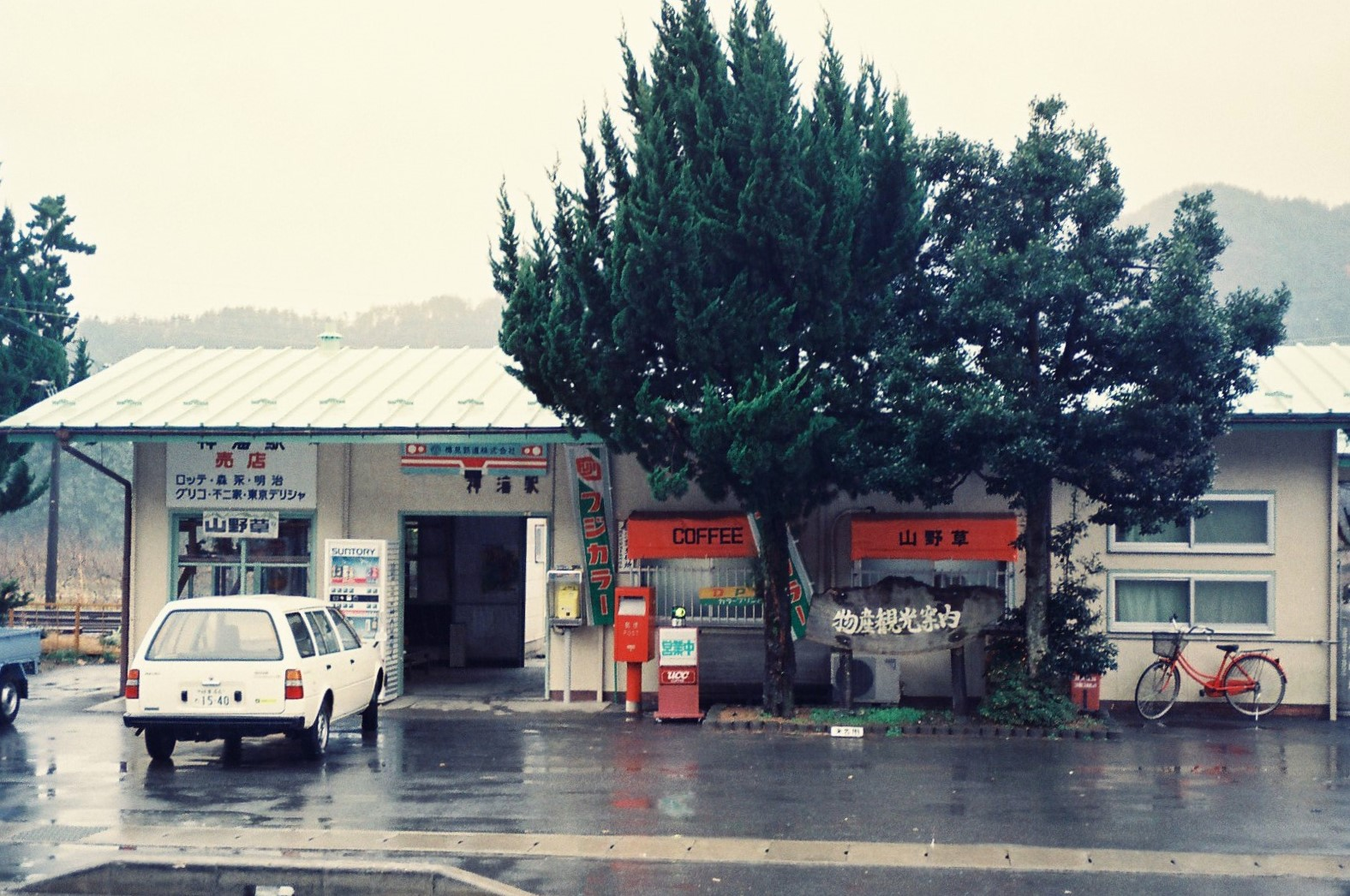
- Kōmi Station in December 1989

General information
- Location: Kōmi, Motosu-shi, Gifu-ken 501-1235; Japan
- Coordinates: 35°32′32.82″N 136°38′30.37″E
- Operator: Tarumi Railway
- Line: ■ Tarumi Line
- Distance: 23.6 km from Ōgaki
- Platforms: 1 island platform
- Tracks: 1

Other information
- Status: Staffed
- Website: Official website (in Japanese)

History
- Opened: May 29, 1958
- Former names: Mino-Kōmi Station (to 1984)
Location
- Location within Gifu Prefecture Location within Japan

Kōmi Station (神海駅, Kōmi-eki) is a railway station in the city of Motosu, Gifu Prefecture, Japan, operated by the private railway operator Tarumi Railway.

== Lines ==
Kōmi Station is a station on the Tarumi Line, and is located 23.6 rail kilometers from the terminus of the line at Ōgaki.

== Station layout ==
Kōmi Station has one ground-level island platform connected to the station building by a level crossing. The station is attended.

== Adjacent stations ==
«	Service	»
Tarumi Railway
Tarumi Line
Tanigumi-guchi	-	Takashina

== History ==
Kōmi Station opened on May 29, 1958 as Mino-Kōmi Station (美濃神海駅), and was the terminus of the Tarumi Line until the extension to Tarumi was completed on March 25, 1989. It was renamed to its present name on August 6, 1984.

== Surrounding area ==
- National Route 157

== See also ==
- List of railway stations in Japan
