= Midori Station (Gifu) =

Railway station in Motosu, Gifu Prefecture, Japan

Midori Station 水鳥駅
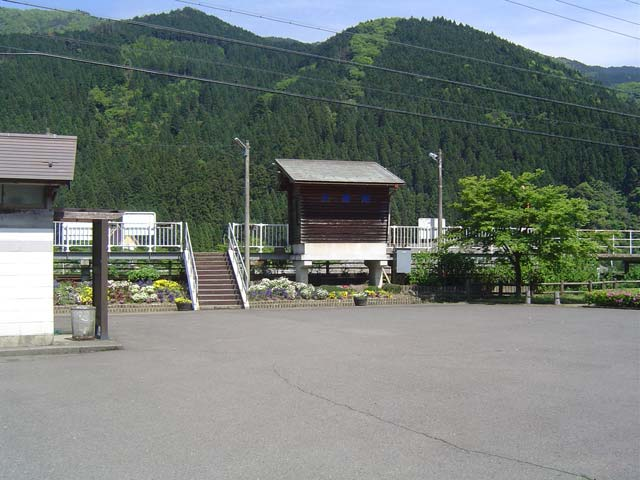
- Midori Station in May 2005

General information
- Location: Neo Midori, Motosu-shi, Gifu-ken 501-1529; Japan
- Coordinates: 35°37′3.14″N 136°37′14.74″E
- Operator: Tarumi Railway
- Line: ■ Tarumi Line
- Distance: 32.5 km from Ōgaki
- Platforms: 1 side platform
- Tracks: 1

Other information
- Status: Unstaffed
- Website: Official website (in Japanese)

History
- Opened: March 25, 1989
Location
- Location within Gifu Prefecture Location within Japan

Midori Station (水鳥駅, Midori-eki) is a railway station in the city of Motosu, Gifu Prefecture, Japan operated by the private railway operator Tarumi Railway.

== Lines ==
Midori Station is a station on the Tarumi Line, and is located 32.5 rail kilometers from the terminus of the line at Ōgaki.

== Station layout ==
Midori Station has one ground-level side platform serving a single bi-directional track. The station is unattended.

== Adjacent stations ==
«	Service	»
Tarumi Railway
Tarumi Line
Takao	-	Tarumi

== History ==
Midori Station opened on March 25, 1989.

== Surrounding area ==
- National Route 157

== See also ==
- List of railway stations in Japan
