= Oribe Station =

Railway station in Motosu, Gifu Prefecture, Japan

Oribe Station 織部駅
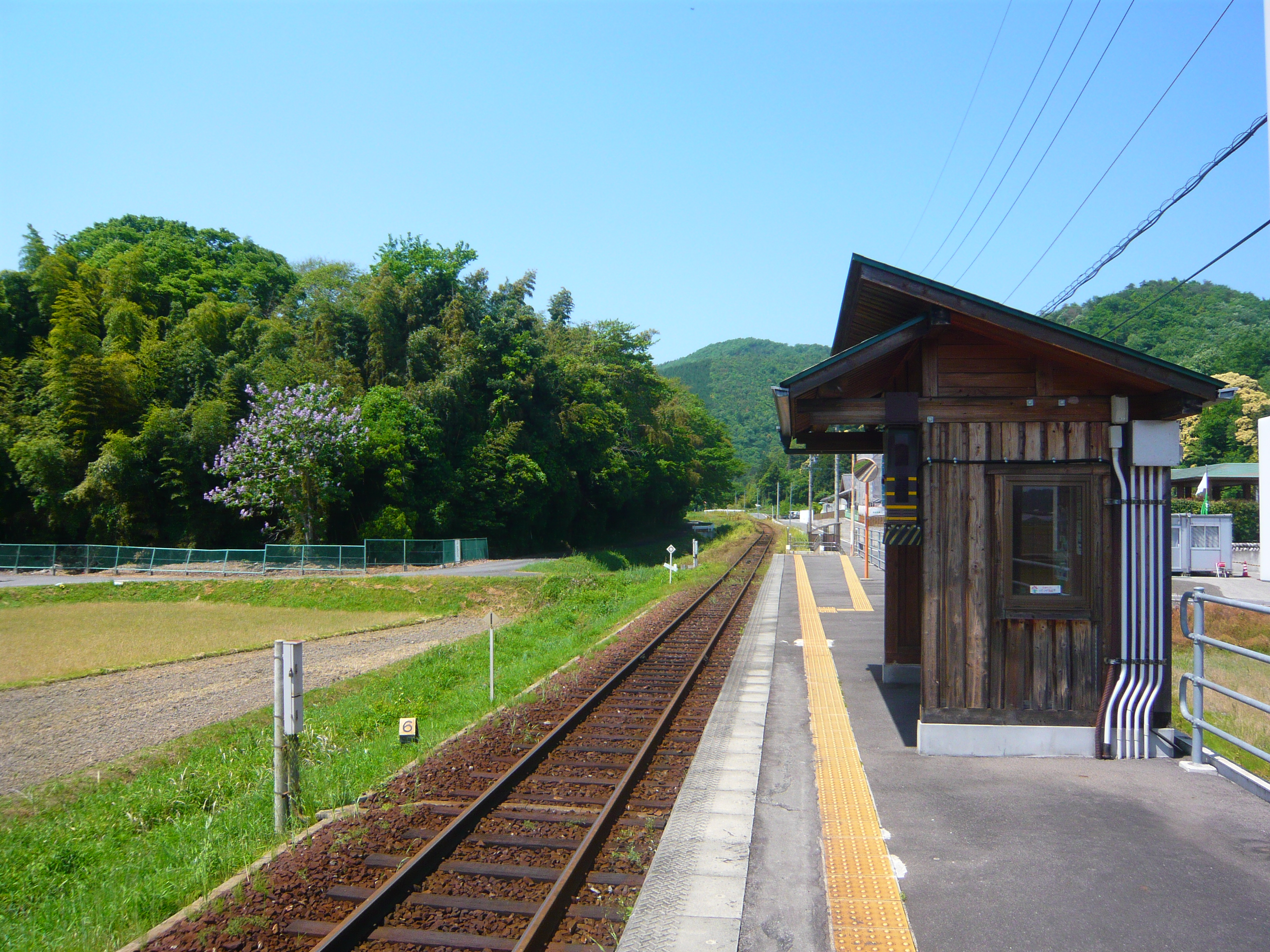
- Oribe Station in May 2005

General information
- Location: Soinakajima, Motosu-shi, Gifu-ken 501-1205; Japan
- Coordinates: 35°29′56.29″N 136°40′2.35″E
- Operator: Tarumi Railway
- Line: ■ Tarumi Line
- Distance: 17.5 km from Ōgaki
- Platforms: 1 side platform
- Tracks: 1

Other information
- Status: Unstaffed
- Website: Official website (in Japanese)

History
- Opened: April 1, 2002
Location
- Location within Gifu Prefecture Location within Japan

Oribe Station (織部駅, Oribe-eki) is a railway station in the city of Motosu, Gifu Prefecture, Japan, operated by the private railway operator Tarumi Railway.

== Lines ==
Oribe Station is a station on the Tarumi Line, and is located 17.5 rail kilometers from the terminus of the line at Ōgaki.

== Station layout ==
Oribe Station has one ground-level side platform serving a single bi-directional track. The station is unattended.

== Adjacent stations ==
«	Service	»
Tarumi Railway
Tarumi Line
Motosu	-	Kochibora

== History ==
Oribe Station opened on April 1, 2002.

== Surrounding area ==
- National Route 157
- Sumitomo-Osaka Cement Company

== See also ==
- List of railway stations in Japan
