= Motosu Station =

Railway station in Motosu, Gifu Prefecture, Japan

Motosu Station 本巣駅
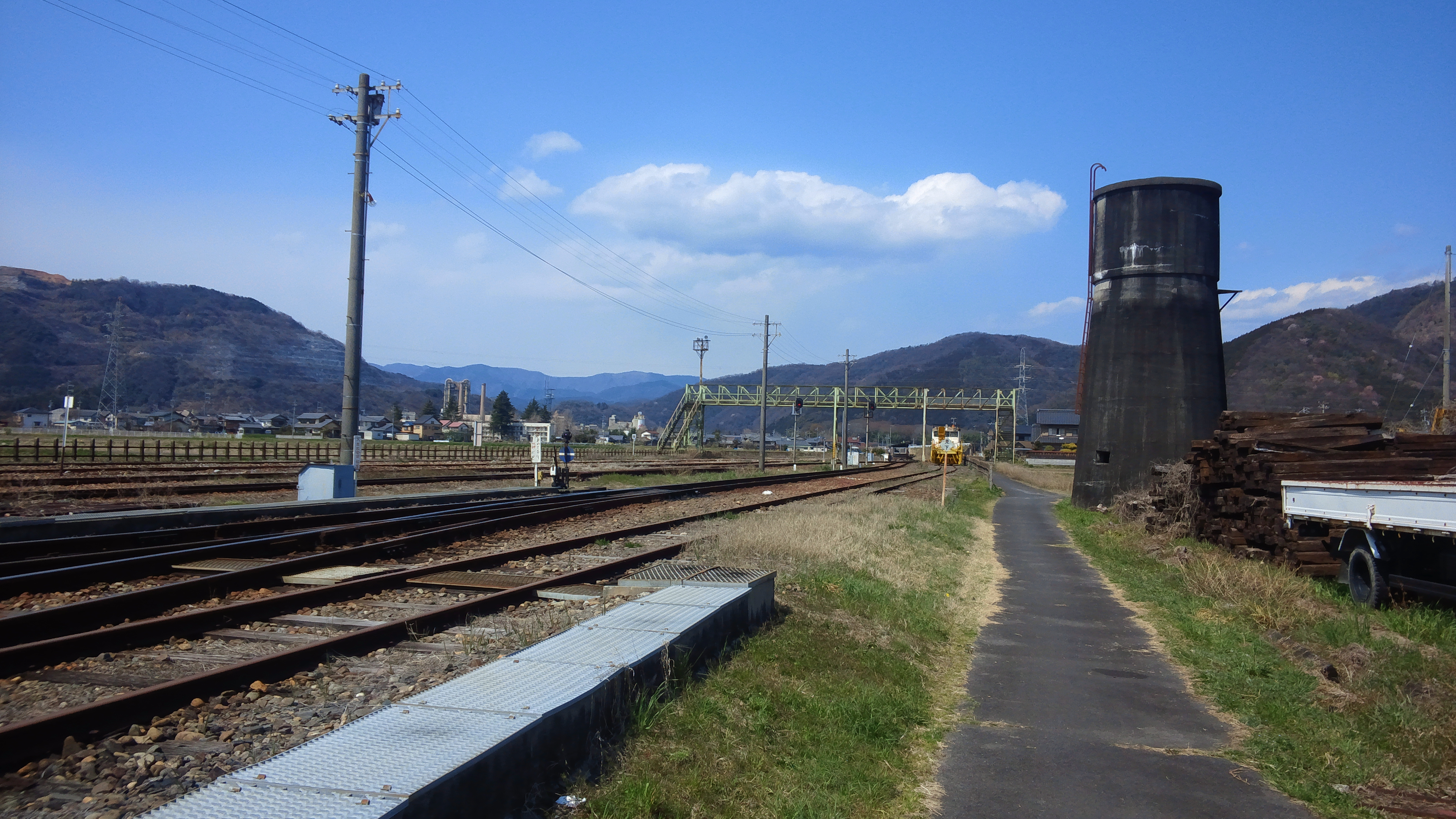
- Motosu Station

General information
- Location: Soinakajima, Motosu-shi, Gifu-ken 501-1205; Japan
- Coordinates: 35°29′15.17″N 136°40′12.45″E
- Operator: Tarumi Railway
- Line: ■ Tarumi Line
- Distance: 16.2 km from Ōgaki
- Platforms: 1 island platform
- Tracks: 2

Other information
- Status: Staffed
- Website: Official website (in Japanese)

History
- Opened: March 20, 1956
- Former names: Mino-Motosu Station (to 1984)
Location
- Location within Gifu Prefecture Location within Japan

Motosu Station (本巣駅, Motosu-eki) is a railway station in the city of Motosu, Gifu Prefecture, Japan, operated by the private railway operator Tarumi Railway.

== Lines ==
Motosu Station is a station on the Tarumi Line, and is located 16.2 rail kilometers from the terminus of the line at Ōgaki.

== Station layout ==
Motosu Station has one ground-level island platform connected to the station building by a level crossing. The station is attended. The station also as a rail yard for the Tarumi Railway.

== Adjacent stations ==
«	Service	»
Tarumi Railway
Tarumi Line
Itonuki	-	Oribe

== History ==
Motosu Station opened on March 20, 1956 as Mino-Motosu Station (美濃本巣駅). It was renamed to its present name of October 6, 1984.

== Surrounding area ==
- National Route 157

== See also ==
- List of railway stations in Japan
