= Morera-Gifu Station =

Railway station in Motosu, Gifu Prefecture, Japan

Morera-Gifu Station モレラ岐阜駅
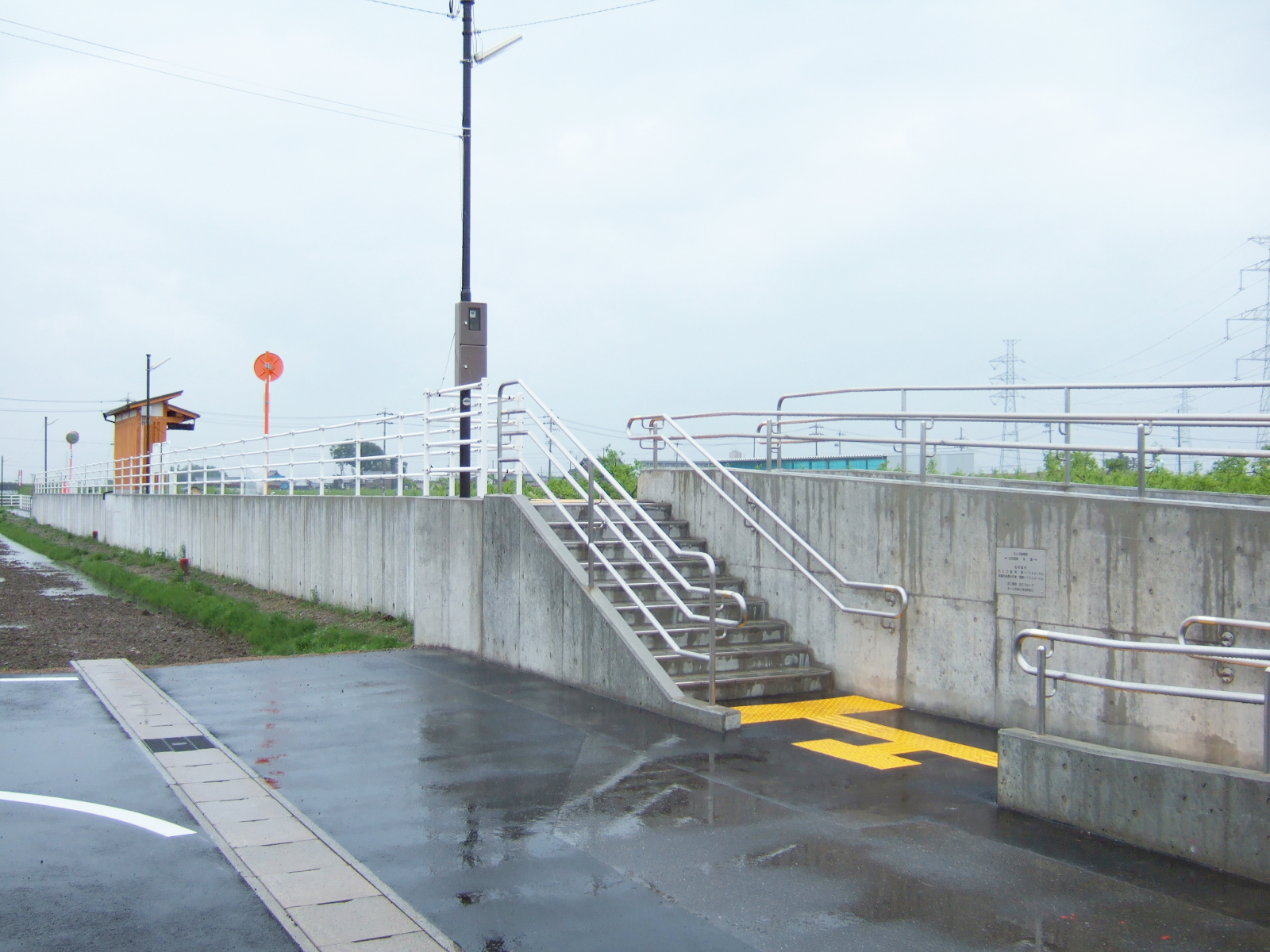
- Morera-Gifu Station in May 2006

General information
- Location: Kochibora, Motosu-shi, Gifu-ken 501-1234; Japan
- Coordinates: 35°27′18.05″N 136°40′11.04″E
- Operator: Tarumi Railway
- Line: ■ Tarumi Line
- Distance: 12.5 km from Ōgaki
- Platforms: 1 side platform
- Tracks: 1

Other information
- Status: Unstaffed

History
- Opened: April 21, 2006
Location
- Location within Gifu Prefecture Location within Japan

Morera-Gifu Station (モレラ岐阜駅, Morera-Gifu-eki) is a railway station in the city of Motosu, Gifu Prefecture, Japan, operated by the private railway operator Tarumi Railway.

== Lines ==
Morera-Gifu Station is served by the Tarumi Line, and is located 12.5 kilometers from the terminus of the line at Ōgaki.

== Station layout ==
Morera-Gifu Station has one ground-level side platform serving a single bi-directional track. The station is unattended.

== Adjacent stations ==
«	Service	»
Tarumi Line
Kitagata-Makuwa	-	Itonuki

== History ==
Morera-Gifu Station opened on April 21, 2006.

== Surrounding area ==
- National Route 303
- Malera Gifu shopping center

== See also ==
- List of railway stations in Japan
