= Oribe =

Oribe may refer to:

== People ==
- Emilio Oribe (1893–1975), Uruguayan poet, essayist, philosopher, and doctor
- Furuta Oribe (1545–1615), originator of Oribe ware pottery
- Manuel Oribe (1792–1857), Uruguayan politician
- Oribe (hairdresser) (1956–2018), American hairdresser
- Oribe Niikawa (born 1988), Japanese footballer
- Oribe Peralta (born 1984), Mexican footballer
- Richard Oribe, Spanish Paralympic swimmer
- Risa Oribe, Japanese musician and singer professionally known as "LiSA"
- María Herminia Sabbia y Oribe (1883-1961), Uruguayan poet

== Other ==
- Oribe ware, a pottery from Japan
- Oribe Station, a railway station in Japan
