= Komi Station =

Komi Station (古見駅) is the name of two train stations in Japan:

- Komi Station (Aichi)
- Komi Station (Okayama)

== See also ==
- Koumi Station
- Kōmi Station
