= Jūkujō Station =

Railway station in Mizuho, Gifu Prefecture, Japan

Jūkujō Station 十九条駅
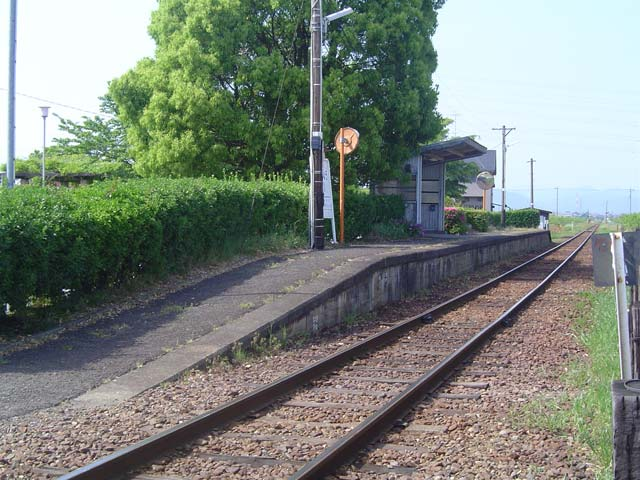
- Jūkujō Station in May 2005

General information
- Location: Jūkujō, Mizuho-shi, Gifu-ken 501-0235; Japan
- Coordinates: 35°23′44.82″N 136°39′39.39″E
- Operator: Tarumi Railway
- Line: ■ Tarumi Line
- Distance: 5.5 km from Ōgaki
- Platforms: 1 side platform
- Tracks: 1

Other information
- Status: Unstaffed
- Website: Official website (in Japanese)

History
- Opened: March 20, 1956
Location
- Location within Gifu Prefecture Location within Japan

Jūkujō Station (十九条駅, Jūkujō-eki) is a railway station in the city of Mizuho, Gifu Prefecture, Japan, operated by the private railway operator Tarumi Railway.

== Lines ==
Jūkujō Station is a station on the Tarumi Line, and is located 5.5 rail kilometers from the terminus of the line at Ōgaki.

== Station layout ==
Jūkujō Station has one ground-level side platform serving a single bi-directional track. The station is unattended. There is no station building.

== Adjacent stations ==
«	Service	»
Tarumi Railway
Tarumi Line
Yokoya	-	Mieji

== History ==
Jūkujō Station opened on March 20, 1956.

== Surrounding area ==
- Goroku River

== See also ==
- List of railway stations in Japan
