= Yokoya =

Yokoya may refer to:

- Yokoya Station, a train station in Mizuho, Gifu Prefecture, Japan
- Hanae Yokoya (born 1978), a Japanese figure skater
- Rancho Yokoya
- Yu Yokoya (18??-1967), a Japanese marine biologist
