= Mieji Station =

Railway station in Mizuho, Gifu Prefecture, Japan

Mieji Station 美江寺駅
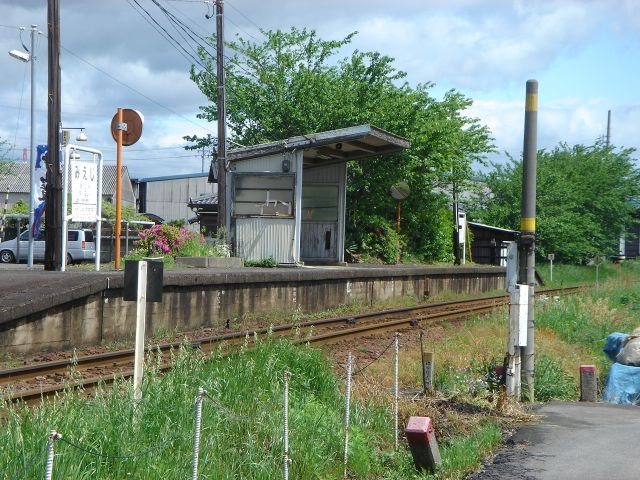
- Mieji Station in May 2005

General information
- Location: Mieji, Mizuho-shi, Gifu-ken 501-0312; Japan
- Coordinates: 35°24′47.97″N 136°39′40.87″E
- Operator: Tarumi Railway
- Line: ■ Tarumi Line
- Distance: 7.5 km from Ōgaki
- Platforms: 1 side platform
- Tracks: 1

Other information
- Status: Unstaffed
- Website: Official website (in Japanese)

History
- Opened: March 20, 1956
Location
- Location within Gifu Prefecture Location within Japan

Mieji Station (美江寺駅, Mieji-eki) is a railway station in the city of Mizuho, Gifu Prefecture, Japan, operated by the private railway operator Tarumi Railway.

== Lines ==
Mieji Station is a station on the Tarumi Line, and is located 7.5 rail kilometers from the terminus of the line at Ōgaki.

== Station layout ==
Mieji Station has one ground-level side platform serving a single bi-directional track. The station is unattended.

== Adjacent stations ==
| « | Service | » |
Tarumi Railway
Tarumi Line
| Jūkujō | - | Kitagata-Makuwa |

== History ==
Mieji Station opened on March 20, 1956.

== Surrounding area ==
- site of former Mieji-juku

== See also ==
- List of railway stations in Japan
