= Tarumi Station =

Tarumi Station is the name of two train stations in Japan:

- Tarumi Station (Gifu) (樽見駅)
- Tarumi Station (Hyogo) (垂水駅)
