= National Institute of Technology, Gifu College =

National college in Motosu, Japan

Coordinates: 35.4467°N 136.6724°E

National Institute of Technology, Gifu College 岐阜工業高等専門学校（岐阜高専）
- Gifu Kōgyō Kōtō Senmon Gakkō (Gifu Kosen)
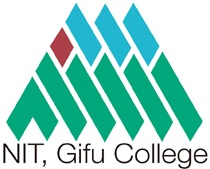
- Type: National
- Established: 1963
- President: Toshihiro Kitada
- Administrative staff: 136
- Undergraduates: 1,052
- Postgraduates: 53
- Location: Motosu, Gifu Prefecture, Japan
- Website: www.gifu-nct.ac.jp/eng/

National Institute of Technology, Gifu College (岐阜工業高等専門学校, Gifu Kōgyō Kōtō Senmon Gakkō) is a national college in the city of Motosu, Gifu Prefecture, Japan. It is sometimes abbreviated as Gifu Kosen (岐阜高専|Gifu Kosen).

== Department and Advanced course ==
The following department and advanced course programs are offered.

=== Departments ===
- Department of Mechanical Engineering
- Department of Electrical and Computer Engineering
- Department of Electronic Control Engineering
- Department of Civil Engineering
- Department of Architecture
- General Education

=== Advanced Course ===
- Electronic System Engineering
- Architecture and Civil Engineering

== Campus ==
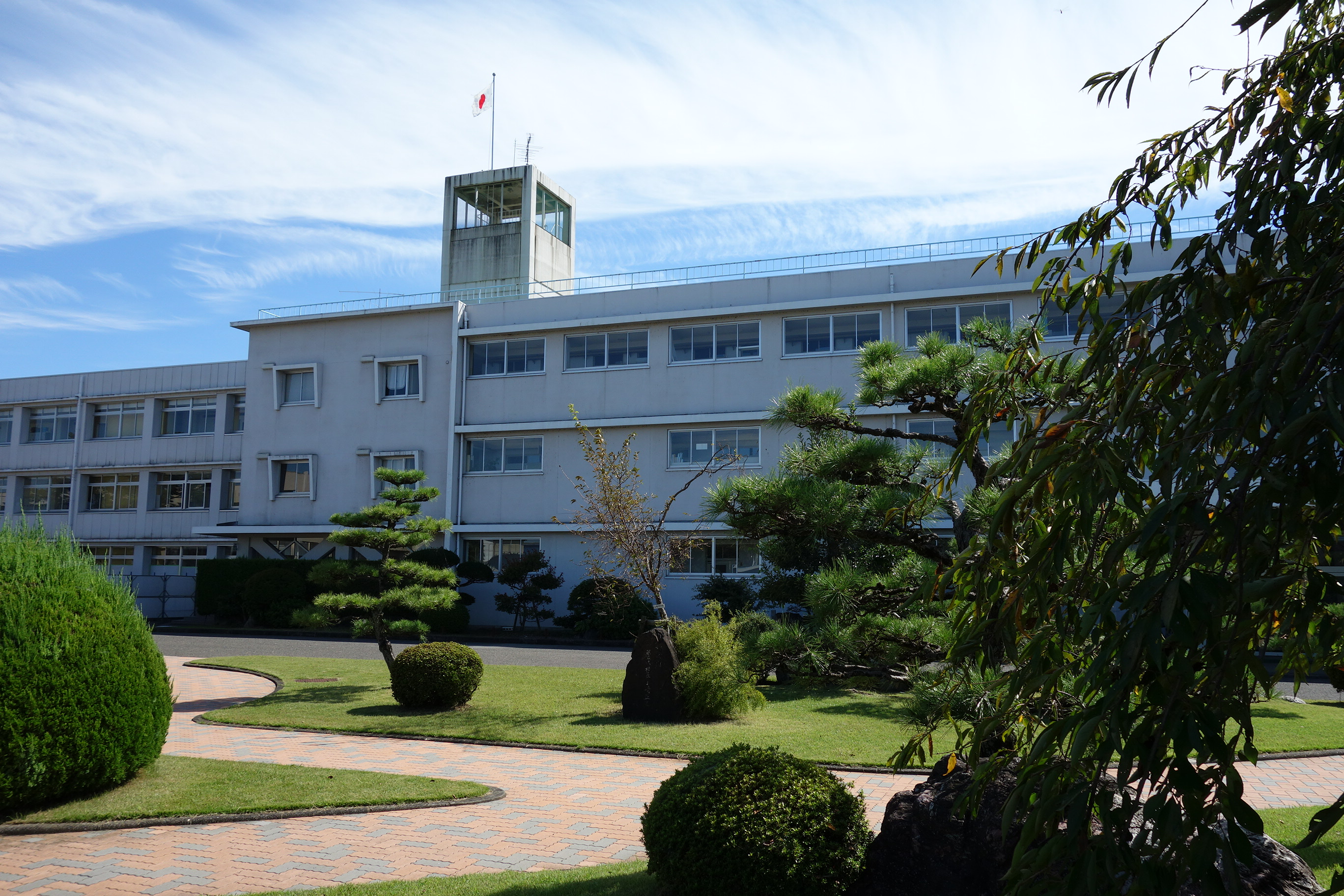
Main Building 1

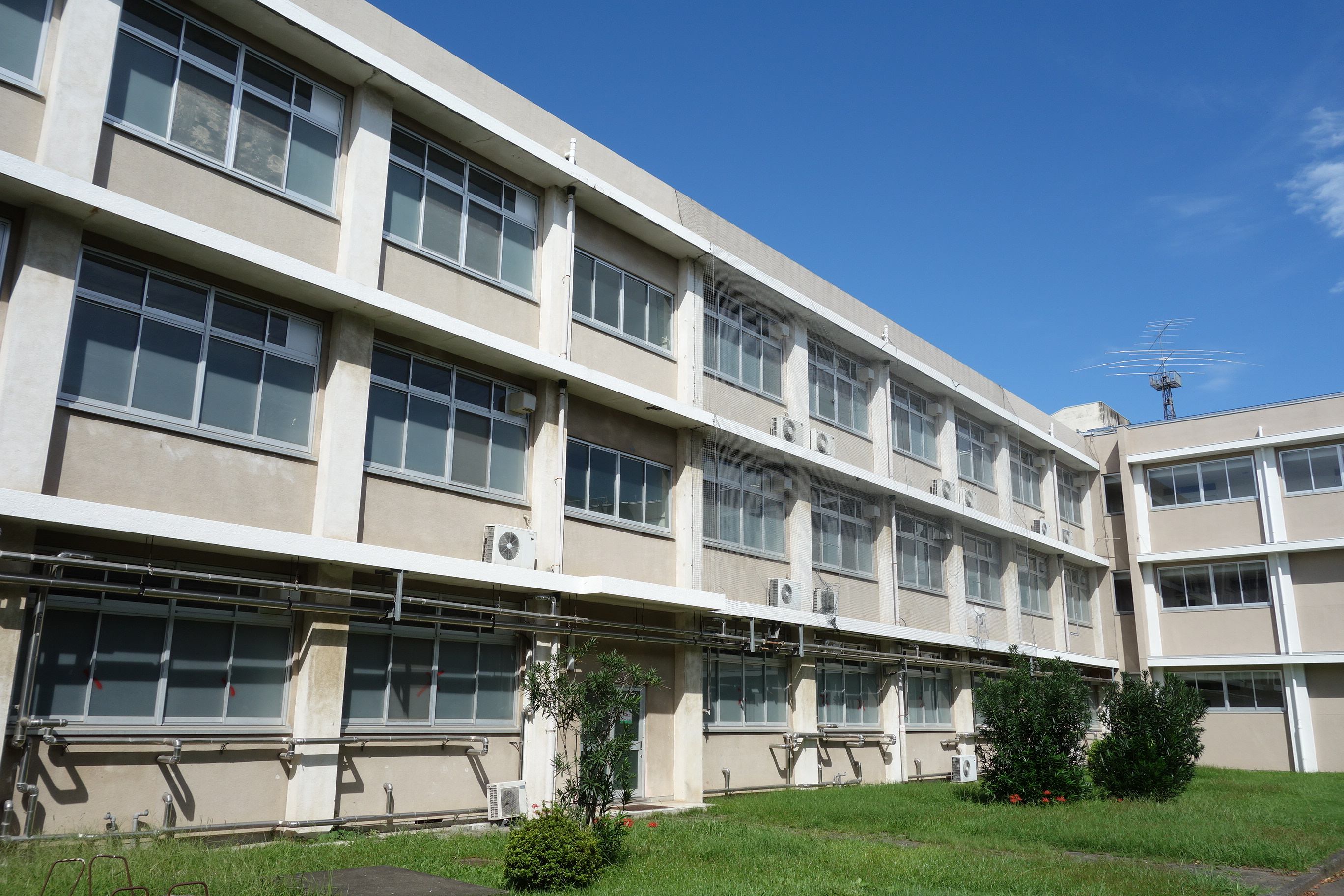
Main Building 2

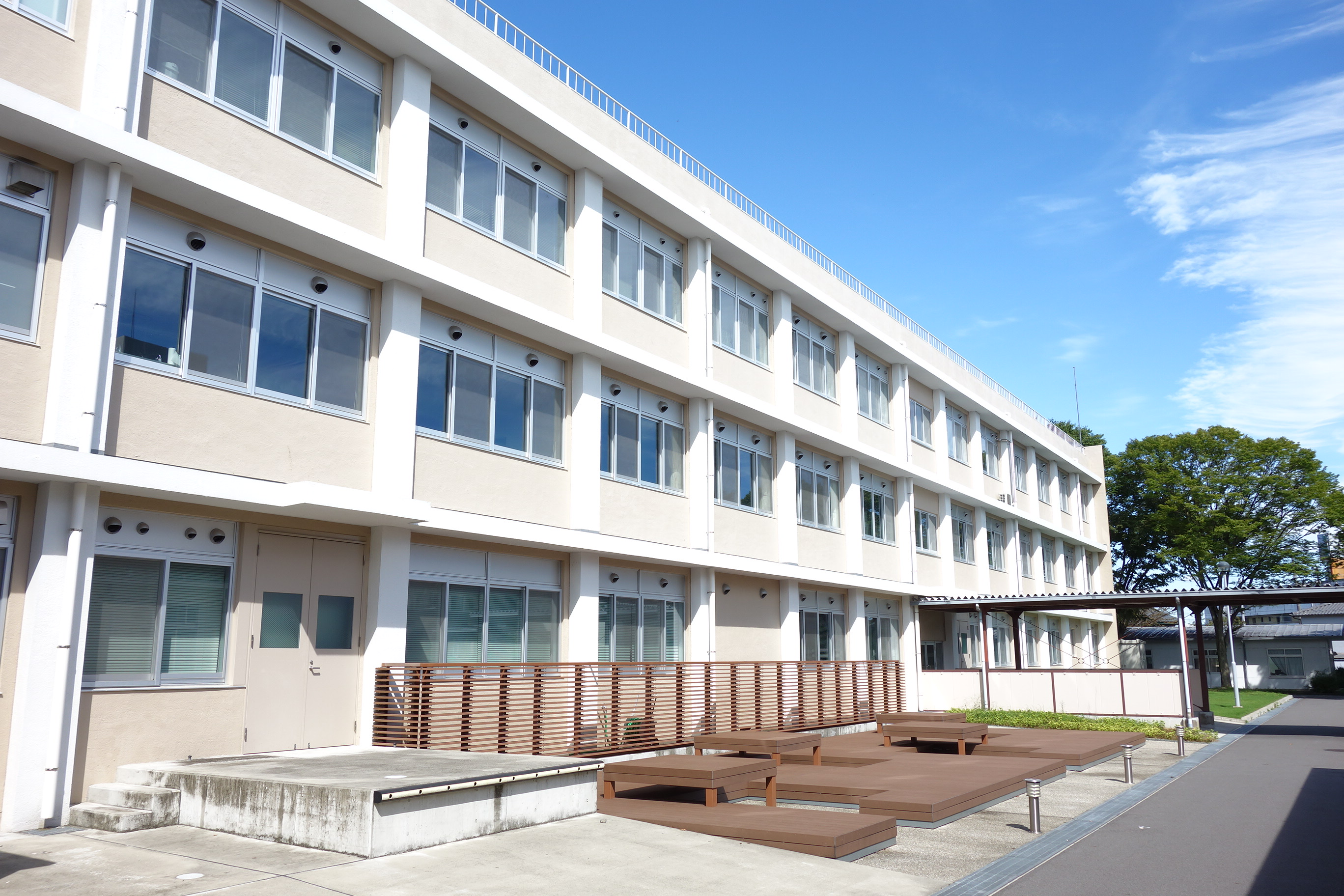
Main Building 3

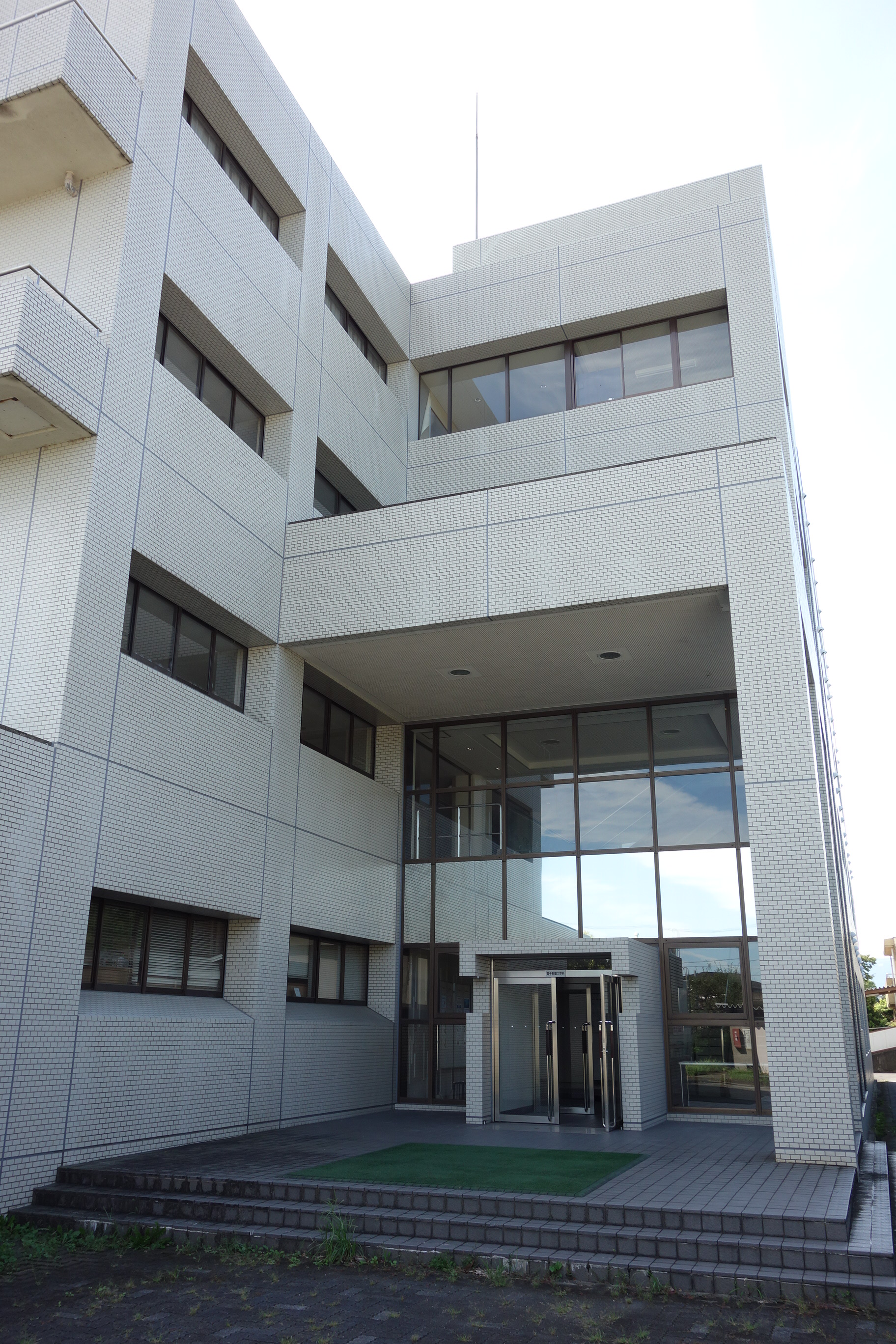
Main Building 5

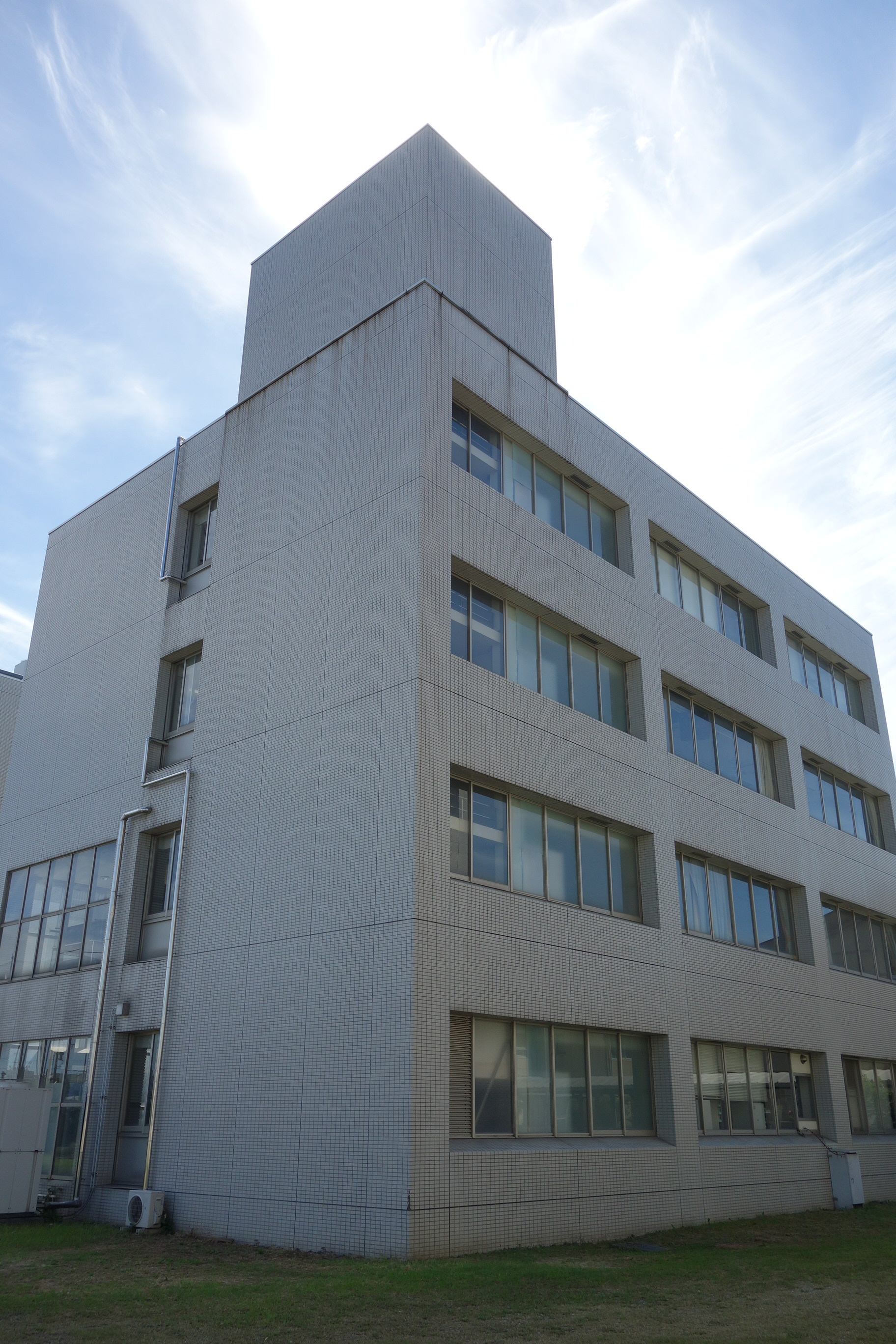
Advanced Course Building

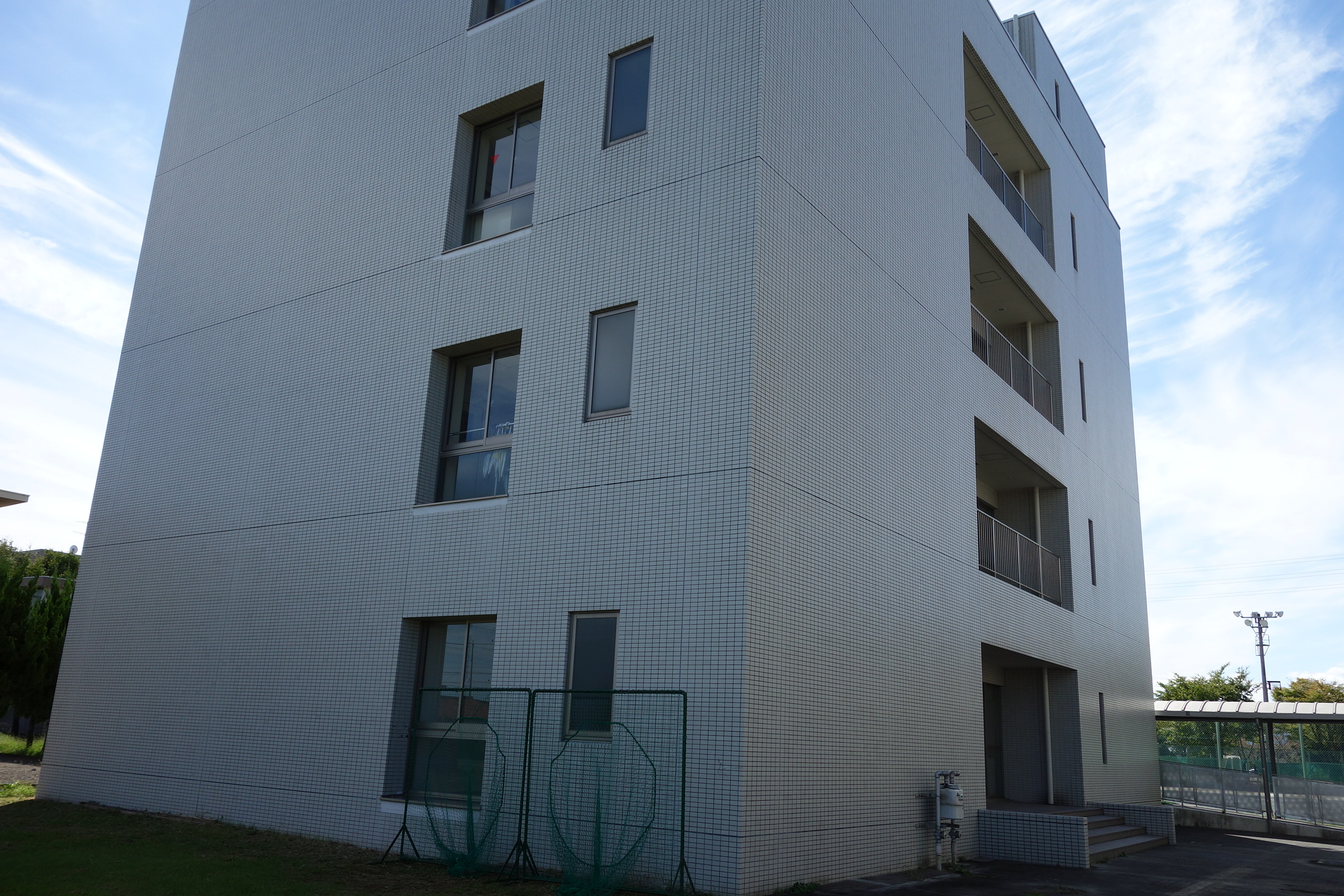
Main Building 6

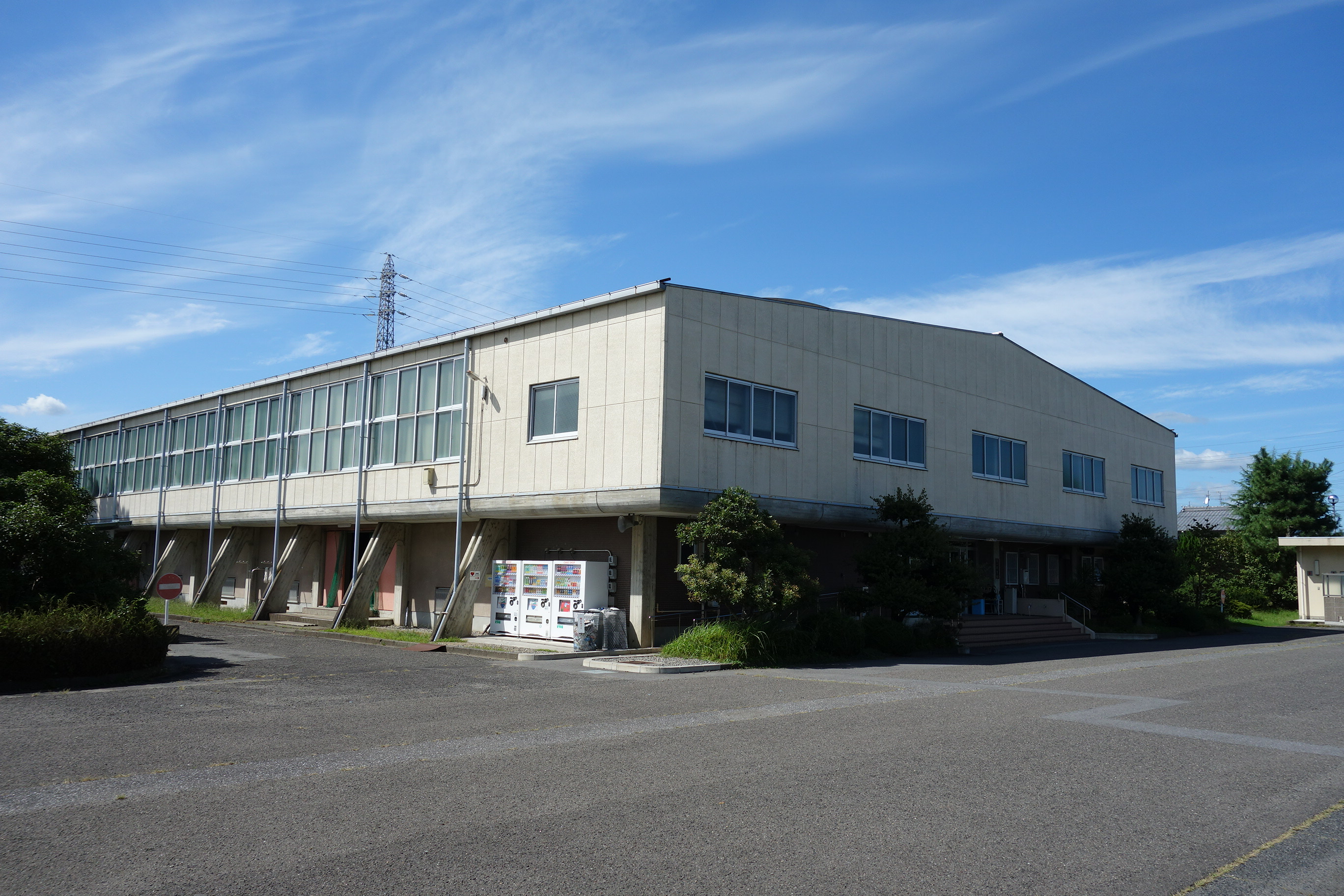
Gymnasium 1

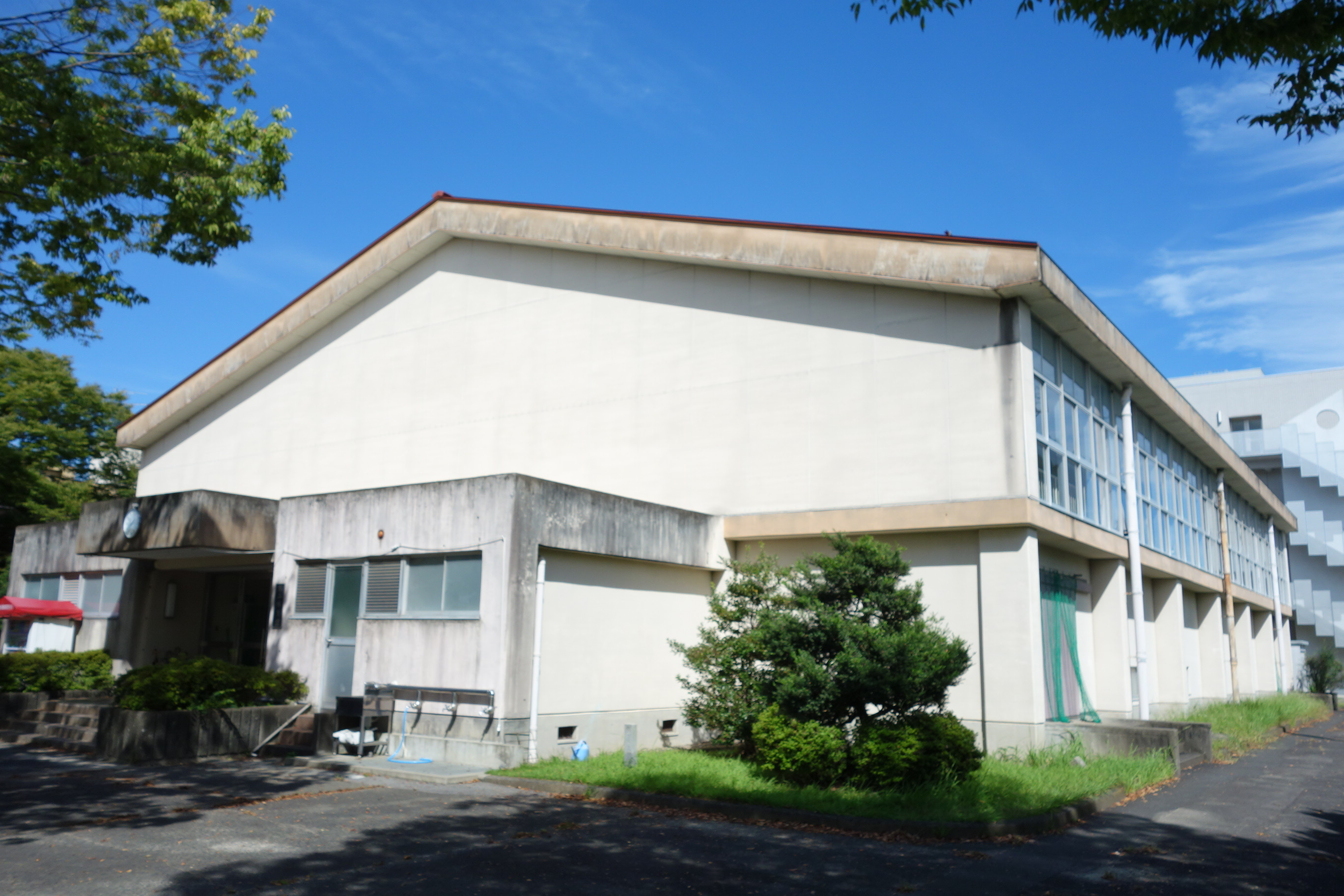
Gymnasium 2

== Notable people ==
- Toshitaka Katada, Professor of Gunma University
- Akiko Kikuchi, Fashion Model
