= Tarumi Line =

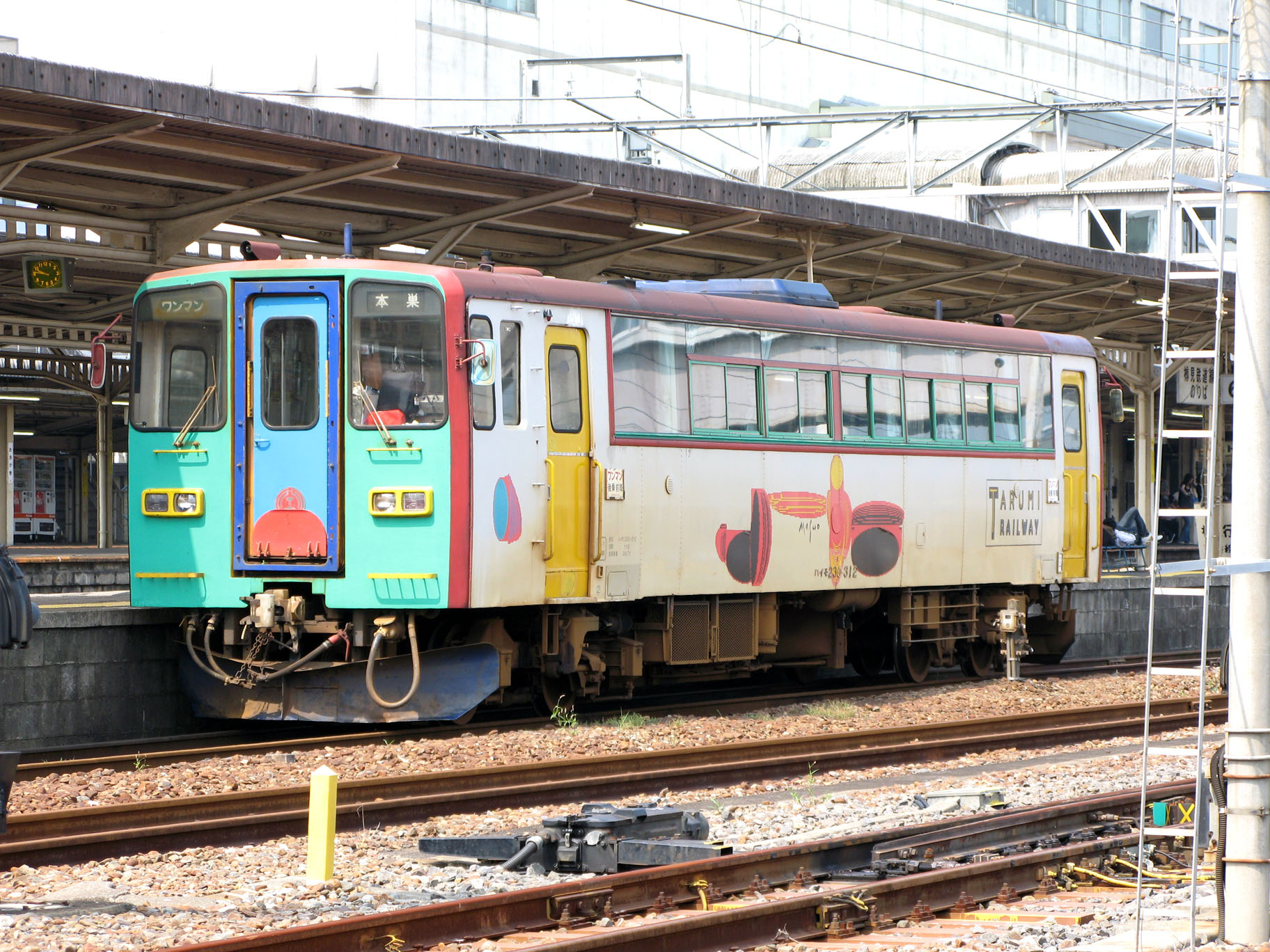
- A "Haimo 230" railbus with exterior livery designed by Masuo Ikeda

Overview
- Native name: 樽見線
- Locale: Gifu Prefecture
- Stations: 19
- Website: https://tarumi-railway.com/ (in Japanese)

History
- Opened: 1956; 70 years ago
- Last extension: 1989

Technical
- Line length: 34.5 km (21.4 mi)
- Track gauge: 1,067 mm (3 ft 6 in)
Route map

The Tarumi Line (樽見線, Tarumi-sen) is a Japanese railway line in Gifu Prefecture, between Ōgaki Station, Ōgaki and Tarumi Station, Motosu. It is the only railway line of the third-sector operator Tarumi Railway (樽見鉄道, Tarumi Tetsudō). There was a freight rail service that transported cement for Sumitomo Ōsaka Cement of Sumitomo Group Gifu factory. It once accounted for 40% of the whole revenue, but the freight operation ceased in spring 2006.

== Basic data ==
- Distance: 34.5 km (21.4 mi)
- Gauge: 1,067 mm (3 ft 6 in)
- Stations: 19
- Track: Single
- Power: Diesel
- Railway signalling: Simplified automatic (ATS-S, ST)
- Stations with passing loops: 4 (Higashi-Ōgaki, Kitagata-Makuwa, Motosu, and Kōmi)

== Stations ==
No.	Name		Distance (km)	Transfers	Location	
TR01	Ōgaki	大垣	0.0	Tōkaidō Main Line; Yōrō Railway Yōrō Line	Gifu	Ōgaki
TR02	Higashi-Ōgaki	東大垣	2.7		Gifu	Ōgaki
TR03	Yokoya	横屋	4.5		Gifu	Mizuho
TR04	Jūkujō	十九条	5.5		Gifu	Mizuho
TR05	Mieji	美江寺	7.5		Gifu	Mizuho
TR06	Kitagata-Makuwa	北方真桑	10.8		Gifu	Motosu
TR07	Morera-Gifu	モレラ岐阜	12.5		Gifu	Motosu
TR08	Itonuki	糸貫	13.4		Gifu	Motosu
TR09	Motosu	本巣	16.2		Gifu	Motosu
TR10	Oribe	織部	17.5		Gifu	Motosu
TR11	Kochibora	木知原	20.2		Gifu	Motosu
TR12	Tanigumi-guchi	谷汲口	21.6		Gifu	Ibigawa, Ibi District
TR13	Kōmi	神海	23.6		Gifu	Motosu
TR14	Takashina	高科	25.2		Gifu	Ibigawa, Ibi District
TR15	Nabera	鍋原	26.4		Gifu	Motosu
TR16	Hinata	日当	28.3		Gifu	Motosu
TR17	Takao	高尾	30.5		Gifu	Motosu
TR18	Midori	水鳥	32.5		Gifu	Motosu
TR19	Tarumi	樽見	34.5		Gifu	Motosu

== History ==
Approved under the Railway Construction Act as a railway line from Ōgaki via Ōno in Fukui Prefecture to Kanazawa in Ishikawa Prefecture, construction began in 1935, was suspended during the Pacific War and resumed in 1952. The first section opened in 1956 between Ōgaki and Tanigumiguchi. Two years later, an extension to Mino-Kōmi (美濃神海) (present-day Kōmi) was made. Construction beyond there continued until it was suspended in 1979.

Freight services ceased in 1974, and in 1984 (due to its operating deficit, sparse traffic and dead end route) the operation and ownership of the line was transferred from the then Japan National Railways (JNR) to the third-sector Tarumi Railway. A major shareholder was the Sumitomo Cement Co., which began freight shipments from Motosu. The improved financial situation resulted in construction being resumed, and the extension from Kōmi to Tarumi 10.9 km (6.8 mi) opened in 1989. The Sumitomo cement traffic ceased in 2006, with the line becoming a passenger-only operation.

== See also ==
- List of railway companies in Japan
- List of railway lines in Japan
