= Masuo Ikeda =

Japanese artist

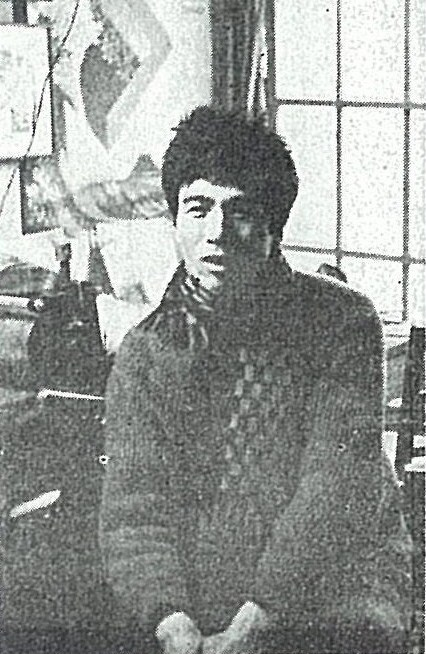
- Born: February 23, 1934
- Died: March 8, 1997 (aged 63)
- Occupations: painter, printmaker, illustrator, sculptor, ceramist, novelist and film director

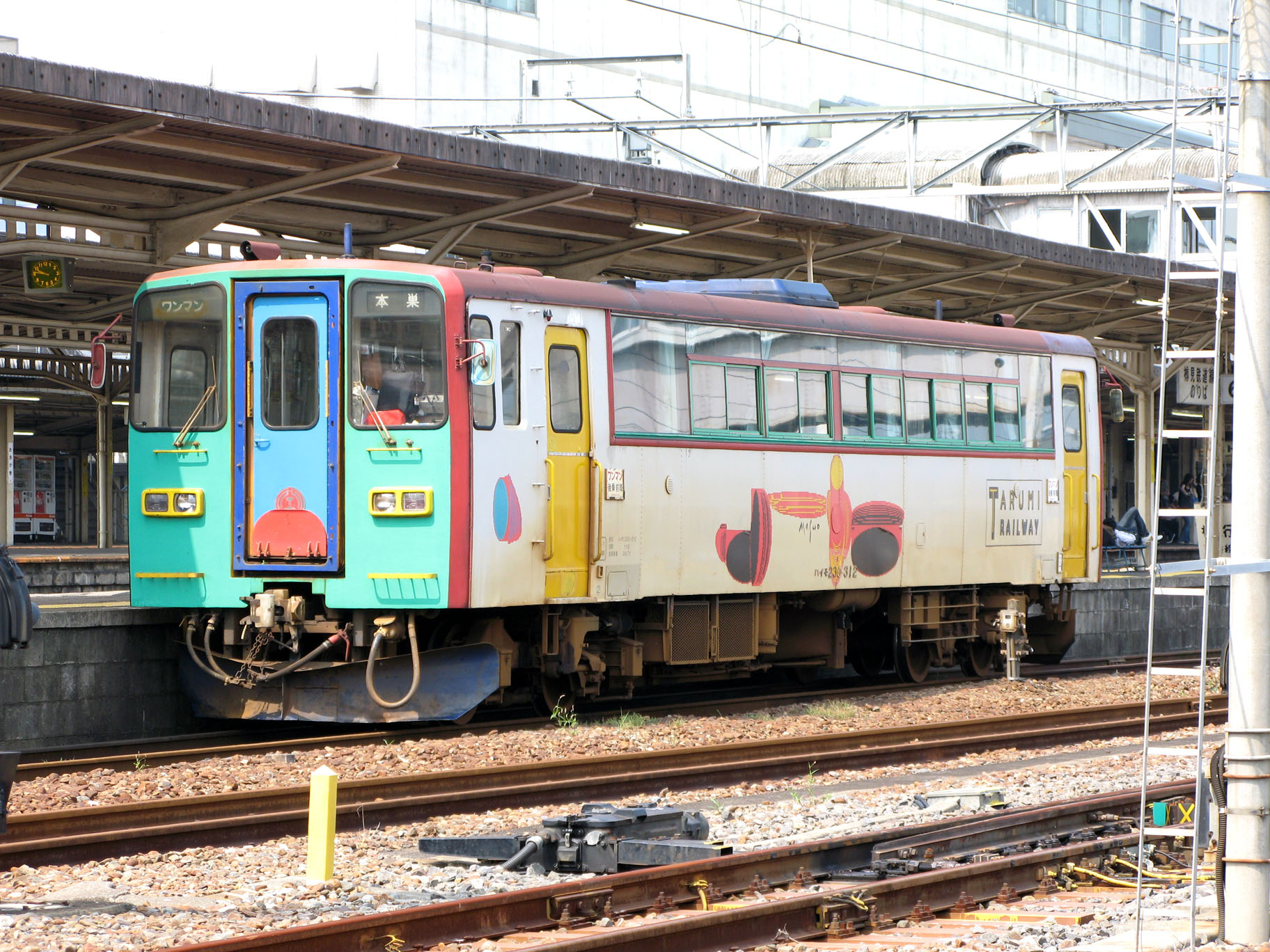
Tarumi Railway Tarumi Line railcar decorated by Masuo Ikeda

Masuo Ikeda (池田 満寿夫, Ikeda Masuo; February 23, 1934 – March 8, 1997) was a Japanese painter, printmaker, illustrator, sculptor, ceramist, novelist, and film director from Nagano Prefecture.

== Awards ==
- Ikeda won the Akutagawa Prize for Offering In The Aegean (Eegekai ni sasagu).

== Museum ==
The Ikeda Masuo Art Museum, named after Ikeda, is located in Nagano.
