= Higashi-Ōgaki Station =

Railway station in Ōgaki, Gifu Prefecture, Japan

Higashi-Ōgaki Station 東大垣駅
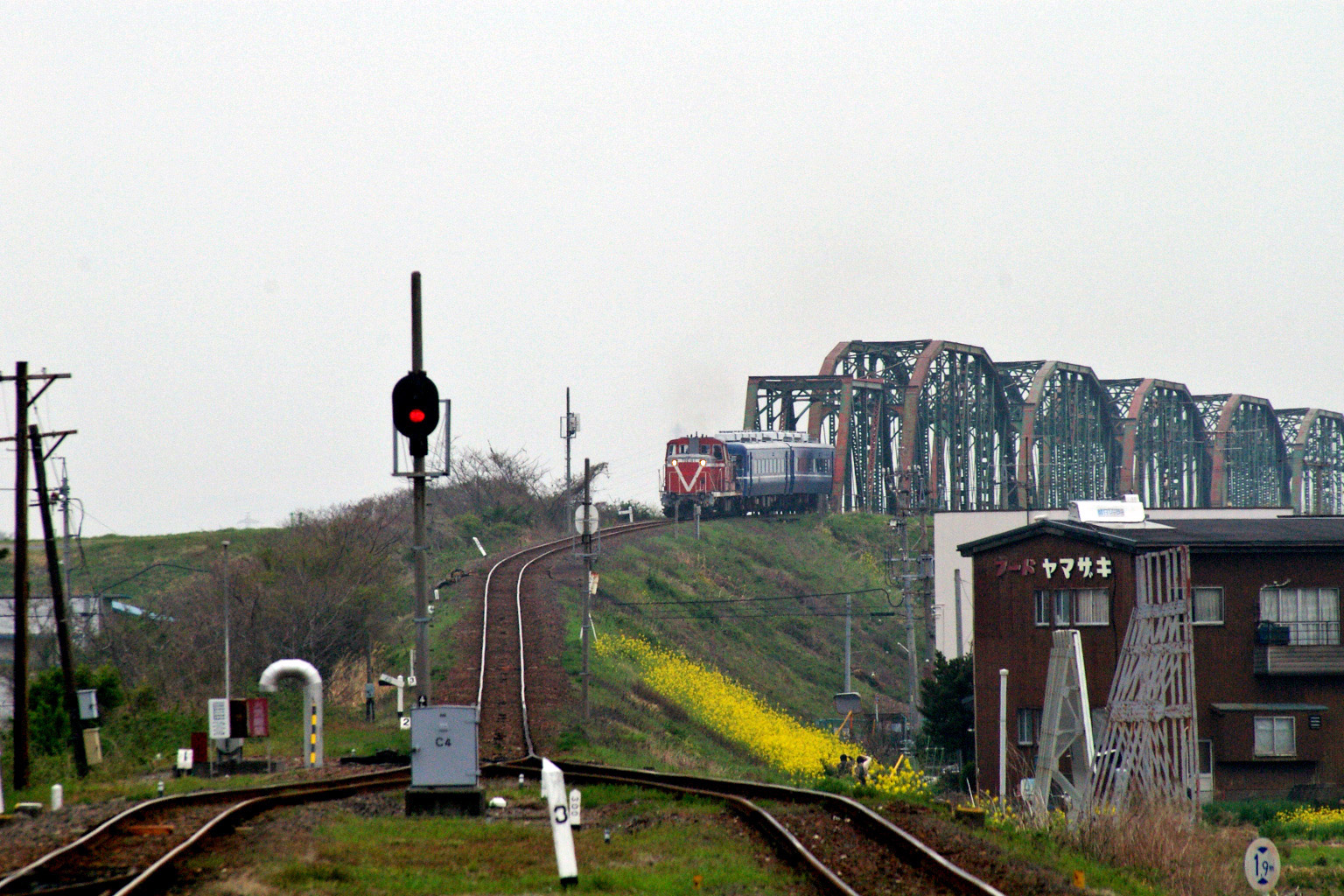
- Higashi-Ōgaki Station in January 2017

General information
- Location: 1 Chome Wagōhonmachi, Ōgaki-shi, Gifu-ken 503-0005; Japan
- Coordinates: 35°22′30.62″N 136°38′45.85″E
- Operator: Tarumi Railway
- Line: ■ Tarumi Line
- Distance: 2.7 km from Ōgaki
- Platforms: 1 island platform
- Tracks: 2

Other information
- Status: Unstaffed
- Website: Official website (in Japanese)

History
- Opened: March 20, 1956
Location
- Location within Gifu Prefecture Location within Japan

Higashi-Ōgaki Station (東大垣駅, Higashi-Ōgaki-eki) is a railway station in the city of Ōgaki, Gifu Prefecture, Japan, operated by the private railway operator Tarumi Railway.

== Lines ==
Higashi-Ōgaki Station is a station on the Tarumi Line, and is located 2.7 rail kilometers from the terminus of the line at Ōgaki.

== Station layout ==
Higashi-Ōgaki Station has one ground-level island platform connected to the station building by a level crossing. The station is unattended.

== Adjacent stations ==
| « | Service | » |
Tarumi Railway
Tarumi Line
| Ōgaki | - | Yokoya |

== History ==
Higashi-Ōgaki Station opened on March 20, 1956.

== Surrounding area ==
- National Route 21
- Ono Elementary School
- Ōgaki Commercial High School

== See also ==
- List of railway stations in Japan
