= Yokoya Station =

Railway station in Mizuho, Gifu Prefecture, Japan

Yokoya Station 横屋駅
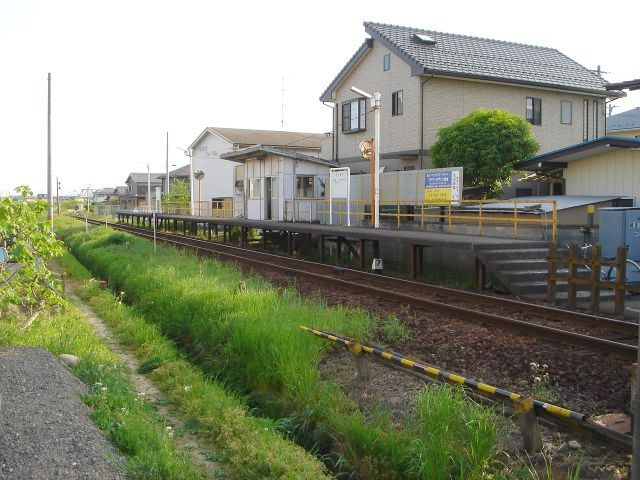
- Yokoya Station in May 2005

General information
- Location: Yokoya, Mizuho-shi, Gifu-ken 501-0321; Japan
- Coordinates: 35°23′13.73″N 136°39′34.06″E
- Operator: Tarumi Railway
- Line: ■ Tarumi Line
- Distance: 4.5 km from Ōgaki
- Platforms: 1 side platform
- Tracks: 1

Other information
- Status: Unstaffed
- Website: Official website (in Japanese)

History
- Opened: February 15, 1960
Location
- Location within Gifu Prefecture Location within Japan

Yokoya Station (横屋駅, Yokoya-eki) is a railway station in the city of Mizuho, Gifu Prefecture, Japan, operated by the private railway operator Tarumi Railway.

== Lines ==
Yokoya Station is a station on the Tarumi Line, and is located 4.5 rail kilometers from the terminus of the line at Ōgaki.

== Station layout ==
Yokoya Station has one ground-level side platform serving a single bi-directional track. The station is unattended.

== Adjacent stations ==
«	Service	»
Tarumi Railway
Tarumi Line
Higashi-Ōgaki	-	Jūkujō

== History ==
Yokoya Station opened on February 15, 1960

== Surrounding area ==
- National Route 21
- Mizuho Minami Elementary School

== See also ==
- List of railway stations in Japan
