= Tarumi Station (Gifu) =

Railway station in Motosu, Gifu Prefecture, Japan

Tarumi Station 樽見駅
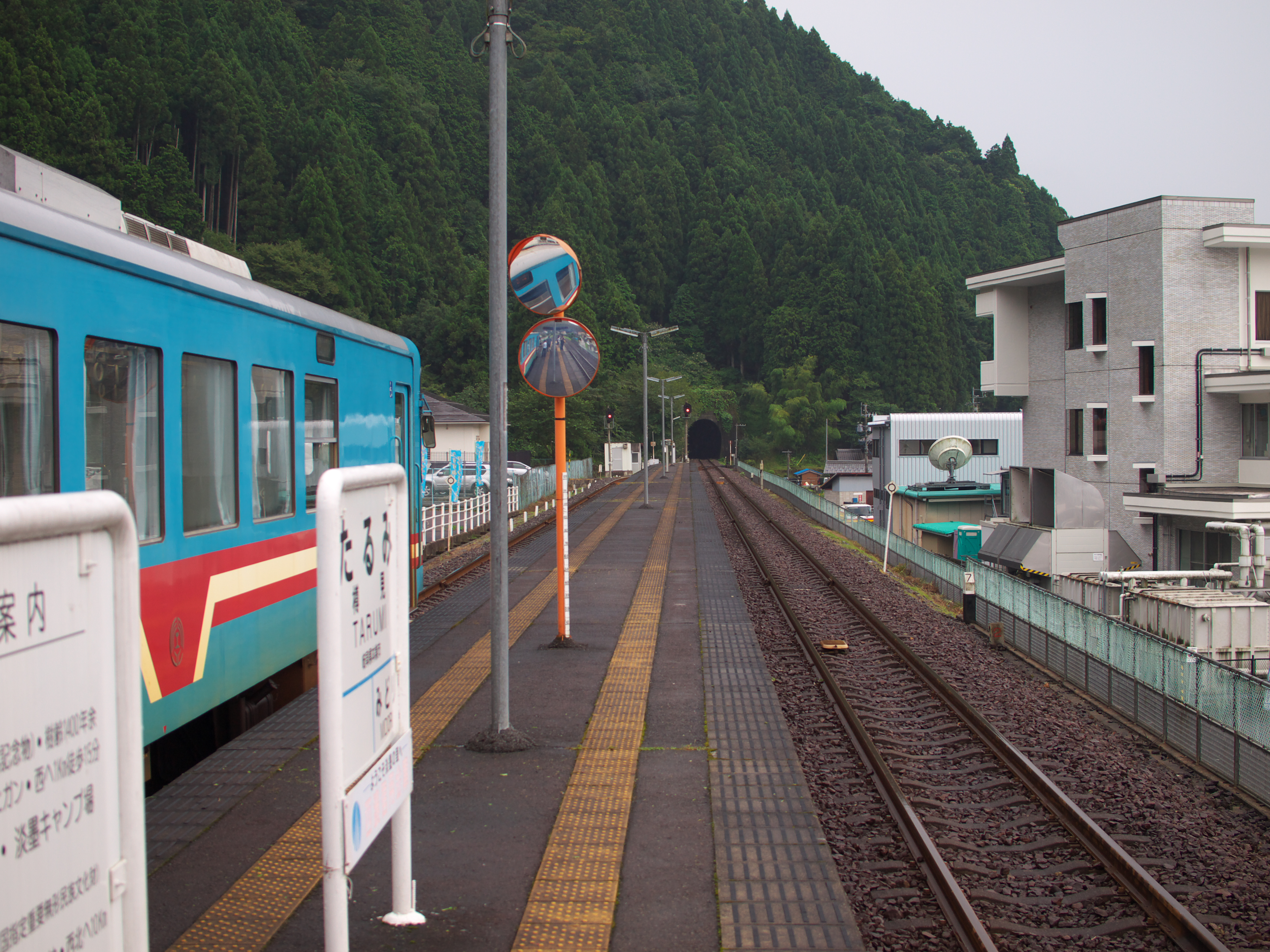
- Tarumi Station in May 2005

General information
- Location: Neoitasho, Motosu-shi, Gifu-ken 501-1524; Japan
- Coordinates: 35°38′6.42″N 136°36′56.97″E
- Operator: Tarumi Railway
- Line: ■ Tarumi Line
- Distance: 41.2 km from Ōgaki
- Platforms: 1 island platform
- Tracks: 2

Other information
- Status: Unstaffed
- Website: Official website (in Japanese)

History
- Opened: March 25, 1989
Location
- Location within Gifu Prefecture Location within Japan

Tarumi Station (樽見駅, Tarumi-eki) is a railway station in the city of Motosu, Gifu Prefecture, Japan, operated by the private railway operator Tarumi Railway.

== Lines ==
Tarumi Station is a terminal station for the Tarumi Line, and is located 41.2 rail kilometers from the opposing terminus of the line at Ōgaki.

== Station layout ==
Tarumi Station has one ground-level island platform connected to the station building by a level crossing. The station is unattended.

== Adjacent stations ==
| « | Service | » |
Tarumi Railway
Tarumi Line
| Midori | - | Terminus |

== History ==
Tarumi Station opened on March 25, 1989. The station building was rebuilt after a fire in April 2017.

== Surrounding area ==
- Neo River
- Neo Post Office
- Neo Elementary School
- National Route 157

== See also ==
- List of railway stations in Japan
