= Tanigumiguchi Station =

Railway station in Ibigawa, Gifu Prefecture, Japan

Tanigumiguchi Station 谷汲口駅
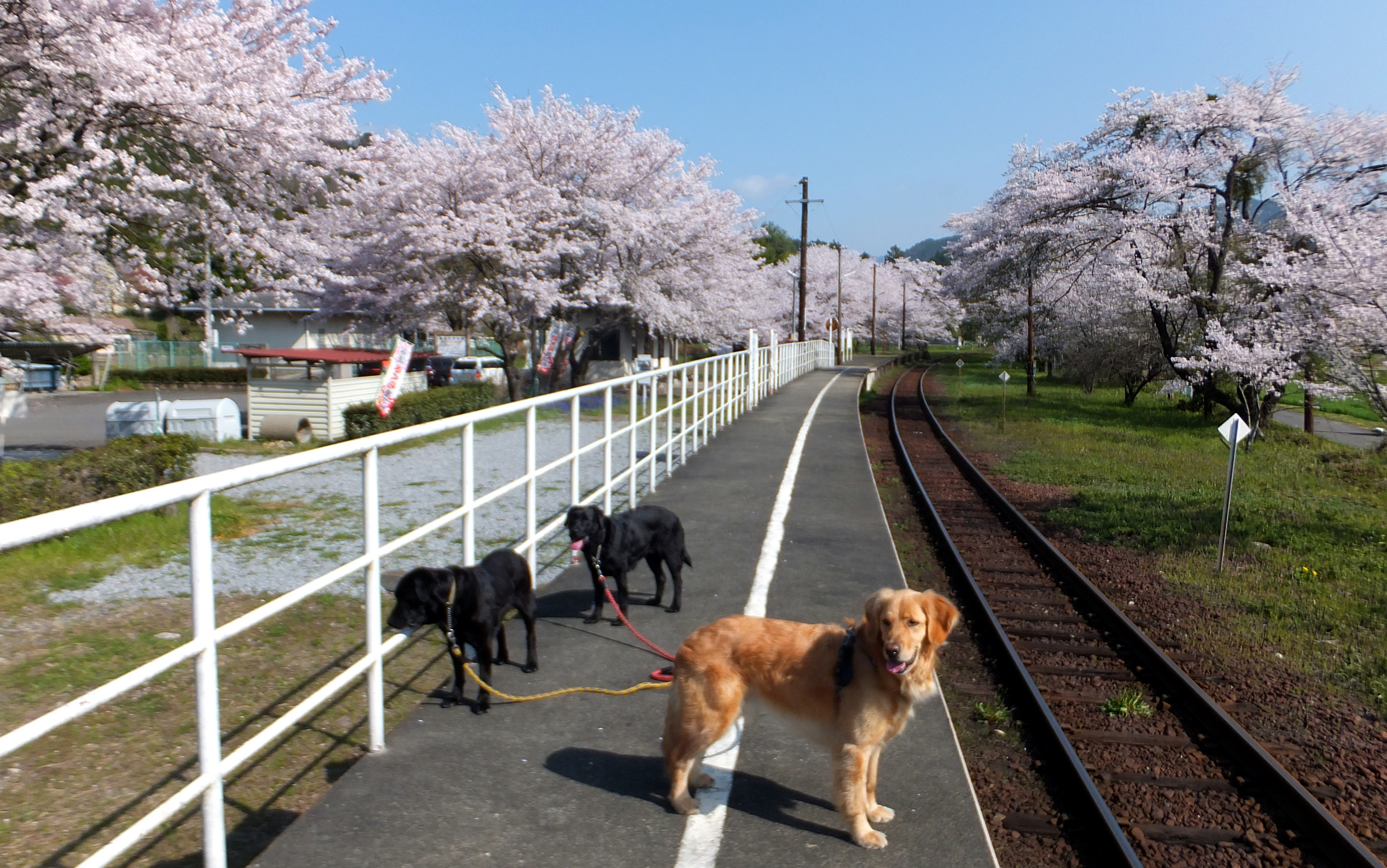
- Tanigumiguchi Station in April 2013

General information
- Location: Tanigumi-Nagase, Ibigawa-cho, Ibi-gun, Gifu-ken 501-1303; Japan
- Coordinates: 35°31′39″N 136°38′32″E
- Operator: Tarumi Railway
- Line: ■ Tarumi Line
- Distance: 21.6 km from Ōgaki
- Platforms: 1 side platform
- Tracks: 1

Other information
- Status: Unstaffed
- Website: Official website (in Japanese)

History
- Opened: March 20, 1956
Location
- Location within Gifu Prefecture Location within Japan

Tanigumiguchi Station (谷汲口駅, Tanigumi-guchi-eki) is a railway station in the town of Ibigawa, Ibi District, Gifu Prefecture, Japan, operated by the private railway operator Tarumi Railway.

== Lines ==
Tanigumiguchi Station is a station on the Tarumi Line, and is located 21.6 rail kilometers from the opposing terminus of the line at Ōgaki.

== Station layout ==
Tanigumiguchi Station has one ground-level side platform serving a single bi-directional track. The station is unattended.

== Adjacent stations ==
«	Service	»
Tarumi Railway
Tarumi Line
Kochibora	-	Kōmi

== History ==
Tanigumiguchi Station opened on March 20, 1956.

== Surrounding area ==
- Tanigumi onsen
- Kegon-ji

== See also ==
- List of railway stations in Japan
