= Mitsuhashi =

Mitsuhashi (written: 三橋 lit. "three bridges") is a Japanese surname. Notable people with the surname include:

- Aki Mitsuhashi (三橋 亜記, born 1989), Japanese field hockey player
- Eizaburo Mitsuhashi (三橋 栄三郎, born 1960), Japanese volleyball player
- Jun Mitsuhashi (三橋 淳, born 1932), Japanese entomologist
- Kanako Mitsuhashi (三橋 加奈子, born 1978), Japanese voice actress
- Kenya Mitsuhashi (三橋 健也, born 1997), Japanese badminton player
- Tatsuya Mitsuhashi (born 1973), Japanese golfer

== See also ==
- Mitsuhashi, Fukuoka, a former town in Fukuoka Prefecture, Japan
