= Neo River =

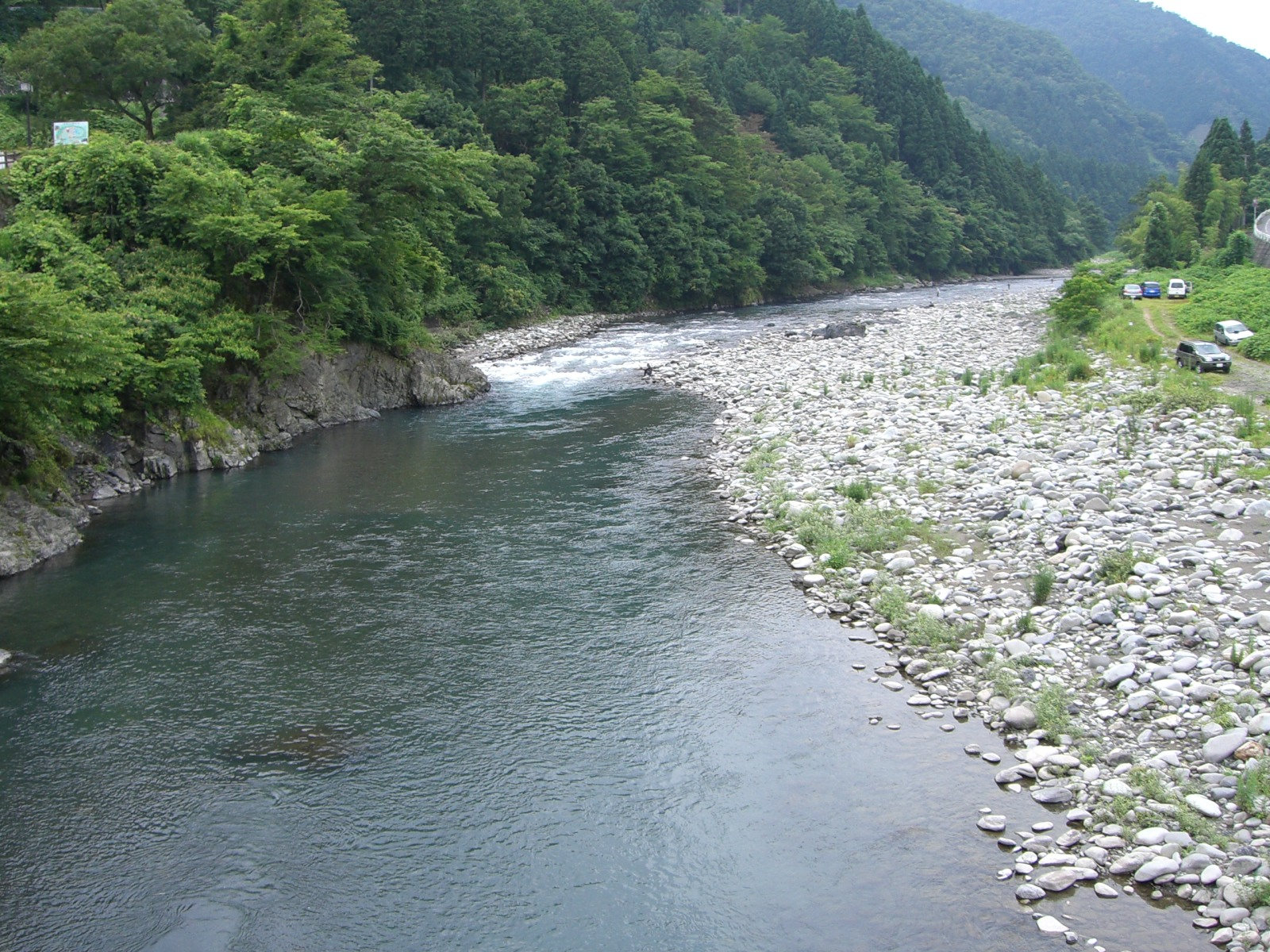

- Native name: 根尾川 (Japanese)

Location
- Country: Japan

Physical characteristics
- Source
  - location: Mount Nōgōhaku
  - elevation: 1,617 m (5,305 ft)
- Mouth
  - location: Ibi River
- Length: 47 km (29 mi)
- Basin size: 389 km^{2} (150 sq mi)

Basin features
- River system: Kiso River

The Neo River (根尾川, Neo-gawa) is a river in Japan which flows through Gifu Prefecture, and is part of the Kiso River system. North of Ōno, the river is also called the Yabu River (藪川, Yabu-kawa).

== Geography ==
The river originates on Mount Nōgōhaku, which lies on the border of Gifu and Fukui prefectures. After starting in Motosu, the river flows into Ibigawa, where it merges with the Ibi River.

== River communities ==
The river passes through or forms the boundary of Motosu, Ibigawa, Ōno, and Hozumi, all in Gifu Prefecture.
