= Japan National Route 157 =

Road in Japan

National Route 157
- 国道157号
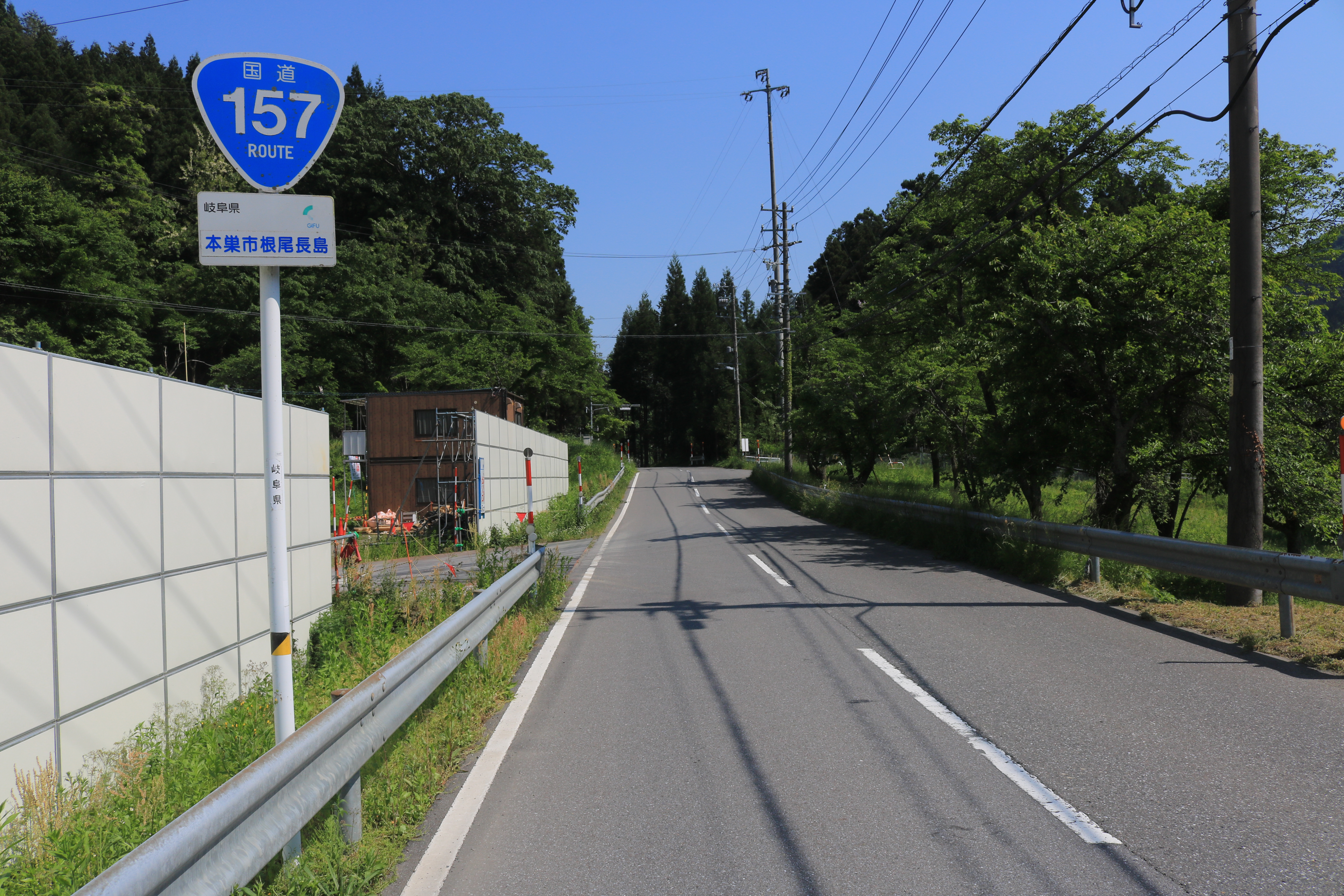

Route information
- Length: 202.6 km (125.9 mi)

Major junctions
- North end: National Route 159 in Kanazawa, Ishikawa
- South end: National Route 21 in Gifu

Location
- Country: Japan

Highway system
- National highways of Japan; Expressways of Japan
← National Route 156	→ National Route 158

National Route 157 is a national highway of Japan connecting Kanazawa, Ishikawa and Gifu in Japan, with a total length of 202.6 km (125.89 mi).
