= Ōgaki Station =

Railway station in Ōgaki, Gifu Prefecture, Japan

CA77 Ōgaki Station 大垣駅
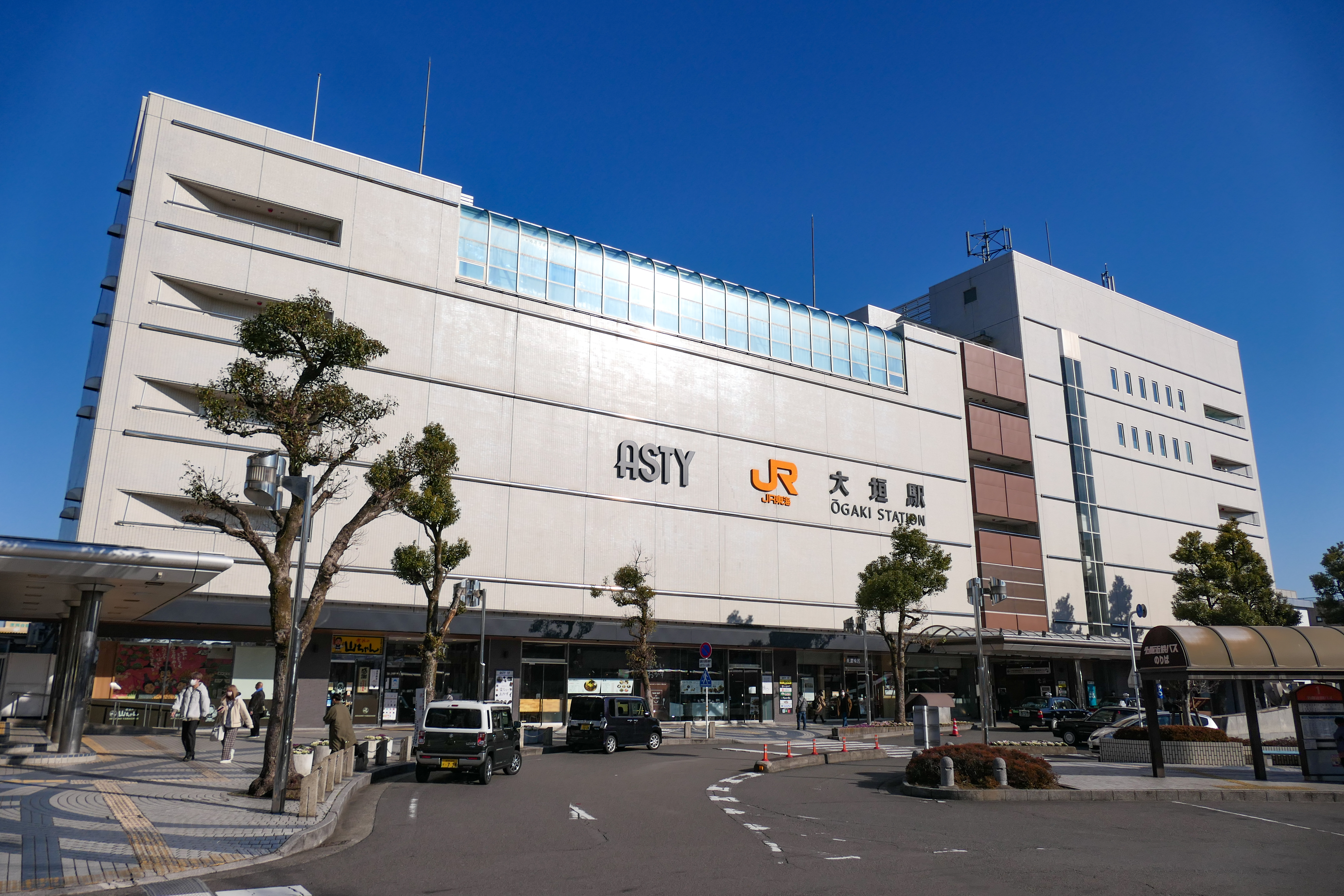
- Ogaki Station in January 2022

General information
- Location: 1 Takayacho, Ōgaki-shi, Gifu-ken; Japan
- Coordinates: 35.3668131°N 136.6176724°E
- Operator: JR Central; Tarumi Railway; Yōrō Railway

Construction
- Accessible: Yes

History
- Opened: 25 May 1884
Location
- Location within Gifu Prefecture Location within Japan

Ōgaki Station (大垣駅, Ōgaki-eki) is a railway station in the city of Ōgaki, Gifu Prefecture, Japan, shared by Central Japan Railway Company (JR Central) and the private railway operators Tarumi Railway and Yōrō Railway. The station is located 410.0 kilometers from the starting point of the Tōkaidō Main Line at Tokyo.

== Lines ==
Ōgaki Station is served by the following lines.

- Tōkaidō Main Line
- Tokaido Main Line (Mino-Akasaka Branch Line)
- Tarumi Railway Tarumi Line
- Yōrō Line

== JR Central, Tarumi Railway ==
Ōgaki Station 大垣駅
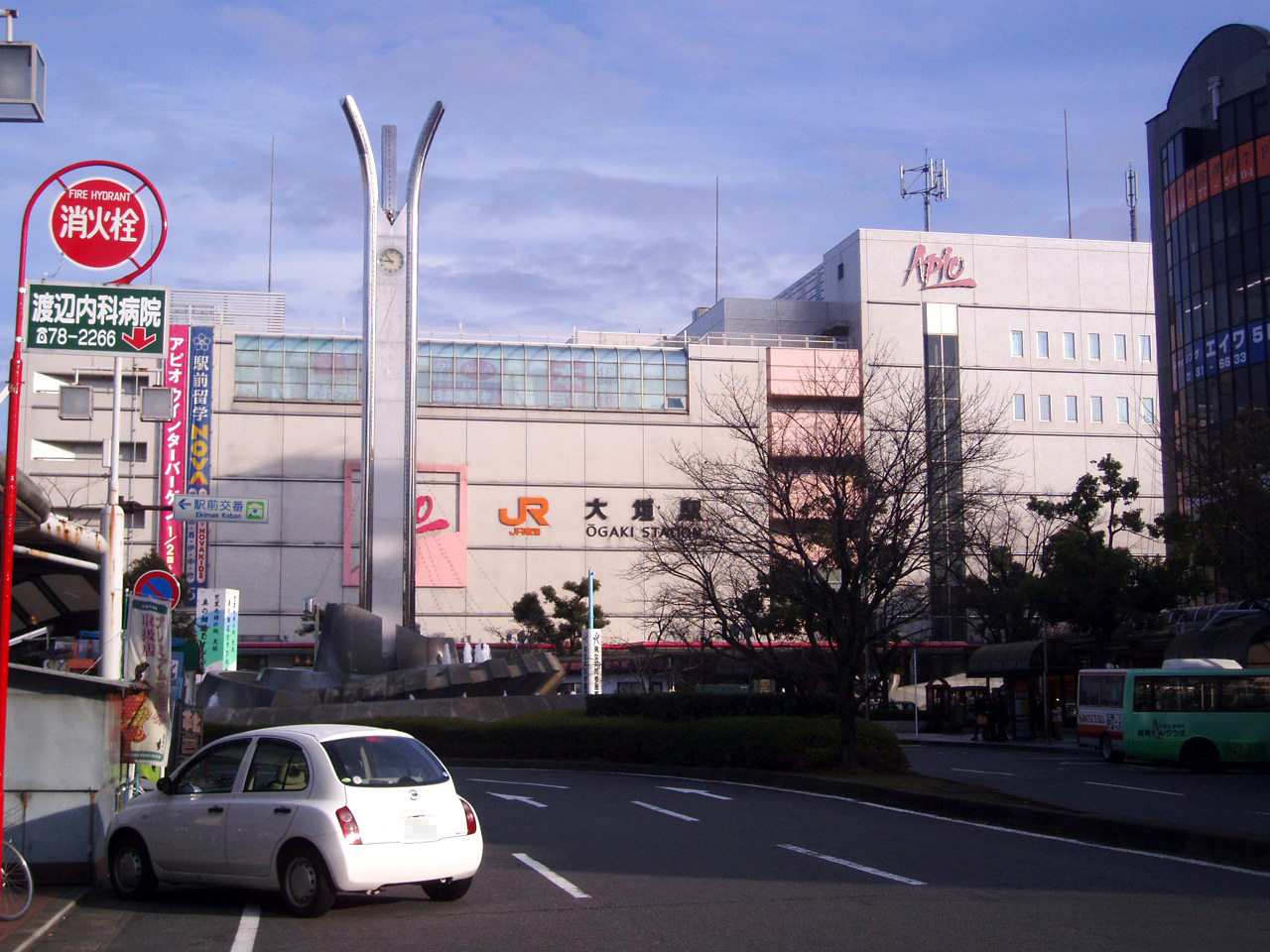
- Ōgaki Station

General information
- Location: 1-145 Takayacho, Ōgaki-shi, Gifu-ken; Japan
- System: JR Central; Tarumi Railway station
- Operator: JR Central; Tarumi Railway
- Lines: Tōkaidō Main Line; ■ Tarumi Line
- Platforms: 3 island + 1 side platforms
- Tracks: 7

Other information
- Status: Staffed (Midori no Madoguchi)

History
- Opened: 25 May 1884

Passengers
- 2023–2024: 30,774 daily (JR Central)
Location

=== Layout ===
JR Ōgaki Station has three ground-level island platforms and one ground-level side platform serving a total of seven tracks. The station has a Midori no Madoguchi staffed ticket office.

1	■ Tokaido Main Line	for Sekigahara and Maibara (starting, siding) trains starting for Gifu, Nagoya and Toyohashi
1	■ Mino-Akasaka Line	Some trains for Mino-Akasaka
2	■ Tokaido Main Line	for Sekigahara and Maibara; Limited Express Shirasagi for Tsuruga; Limited Express Hida for Maibara, Kyoto and Osaka
2	■ Mino-Akasaka Line	Some trains for Mino-Akasaka
3	■ Mino-Akasaka Line	for Mino-Akasaka
4	■ Tokaido Main Line	for Gifu and Nagoya; Shirasagi for Gifu and Nagoya
5	■ Tokaido Main Line	for Gifu and Nagoya
6, 7	■ Tarumi Railway Tarumi Line	for Motosu and Tarumi

=== Adjacent stations ===
«	Service	»
Tokaido Main Line
Gifu	Limited Express Hida	Maibara
Gifu	Limited Express Shirasagi	Maibara
Hozumi	Special Rapid	Tarui
Hozumi	New Rapid	Tarui
Hozumi	Rapid	Tarui
Hozumi	Semi Rapid	Tarui
Hozumi	Local	Tarui
Mino-Akasaka Branch Line
Hozumi	Semi Rapid	Arao
Hozumi	Local	Arao
Tarumi Line
Terminus	Local	Higashi-Ōgaki

=== History ===
JR Ōgaki Station opened on 25 May 1884.

Station numbering was introduced to the section of the Tōkaidō Line operated JR Central in March 2018; Ōgaki Station was assigned station number CA77.

=== Passenger statistics ===
In fiscal 2016, the station was used by an average of 17,046 passengers daily (boarding passengers only).

=== Ōgaki Dash ===
Before it was retired in 2021, the overnight rapid train Moonlight Nagara terminated at Ōgaki Station. A rather popular service among Seishun 18 Ticket holders travelling long distances, after alighting, these ticket holders would transfer to other trains at the station. The interchange window between the Moonlight Nagara (5:50 arrival) and the next Maibara-bound local train (5:53 departure) was merely 3 minutes; to make this connection, passengers ran up the stairs, across the overpass, and down another set of stairs to the opposing to platform in order to secure a seat on the next train after their long journey on the Moonlight Nagara. This became dubbed as the "Ōgaki Dash" (大垣ダッシュ). Some passengers were known to choose particular seats aboard the Moonlight Nagara in order to position themselves as close as possible to the stairs upon arriving at the station. JR Central, in response to passengers performing the Ōgaki Dash, later put up signs warning passengers not to run.

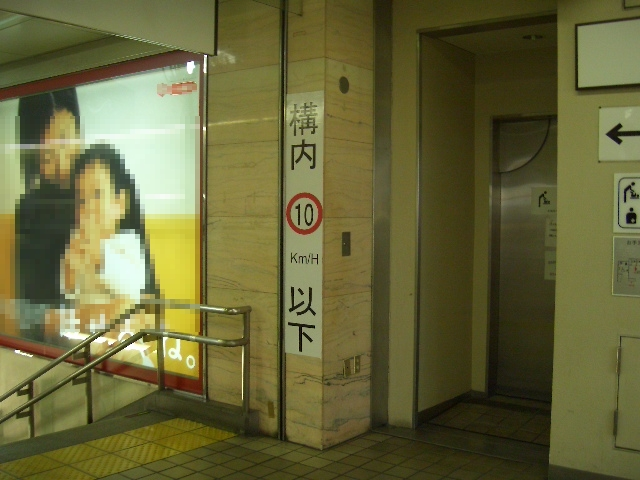
Previously used sign that says "In station area: Speed limit 10 km/h"

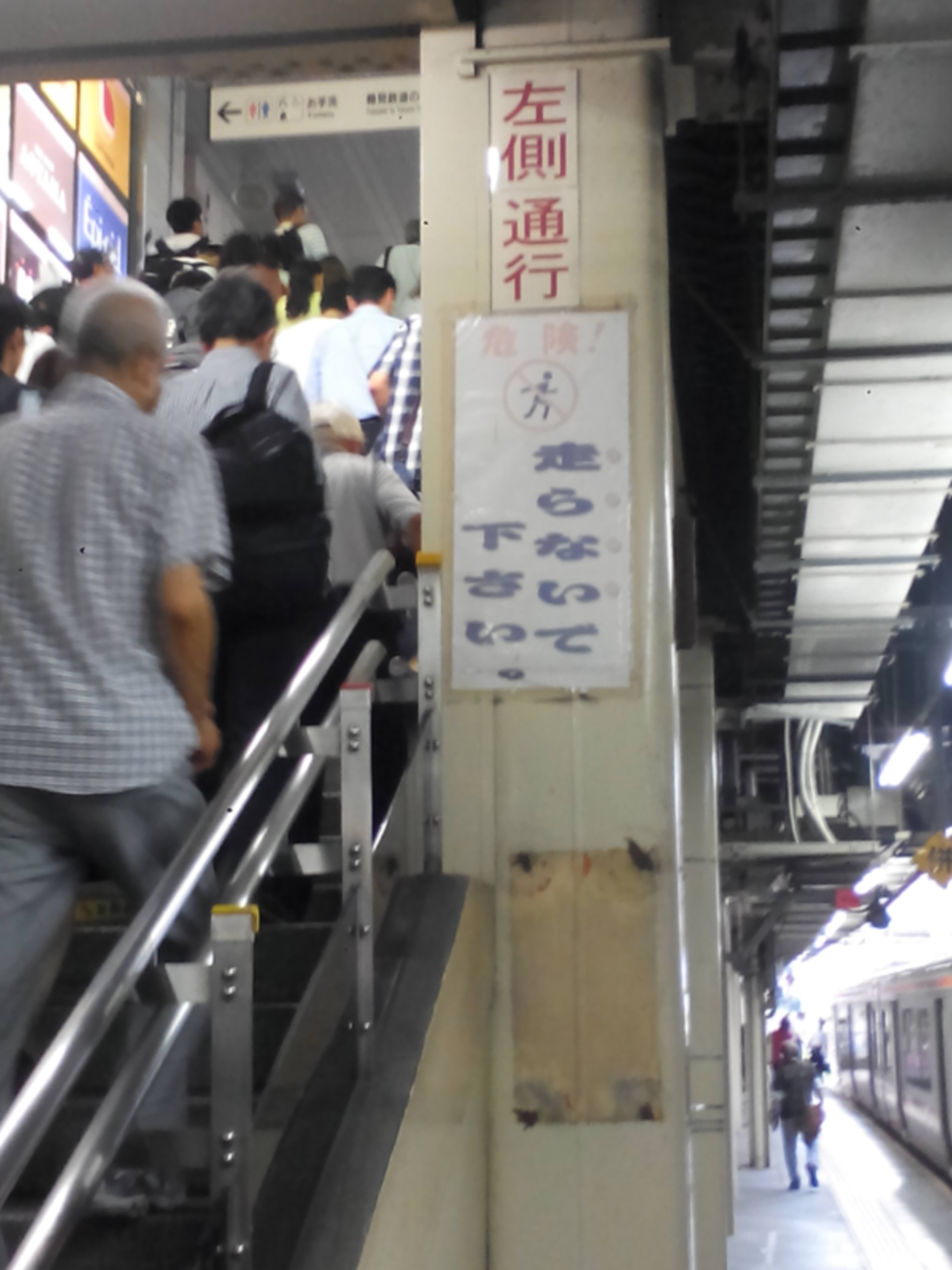
Currently used sign that says "Dangerous! Please do not run!"

== Yōrō Railway ==
Ōgaki Station 大垣駅
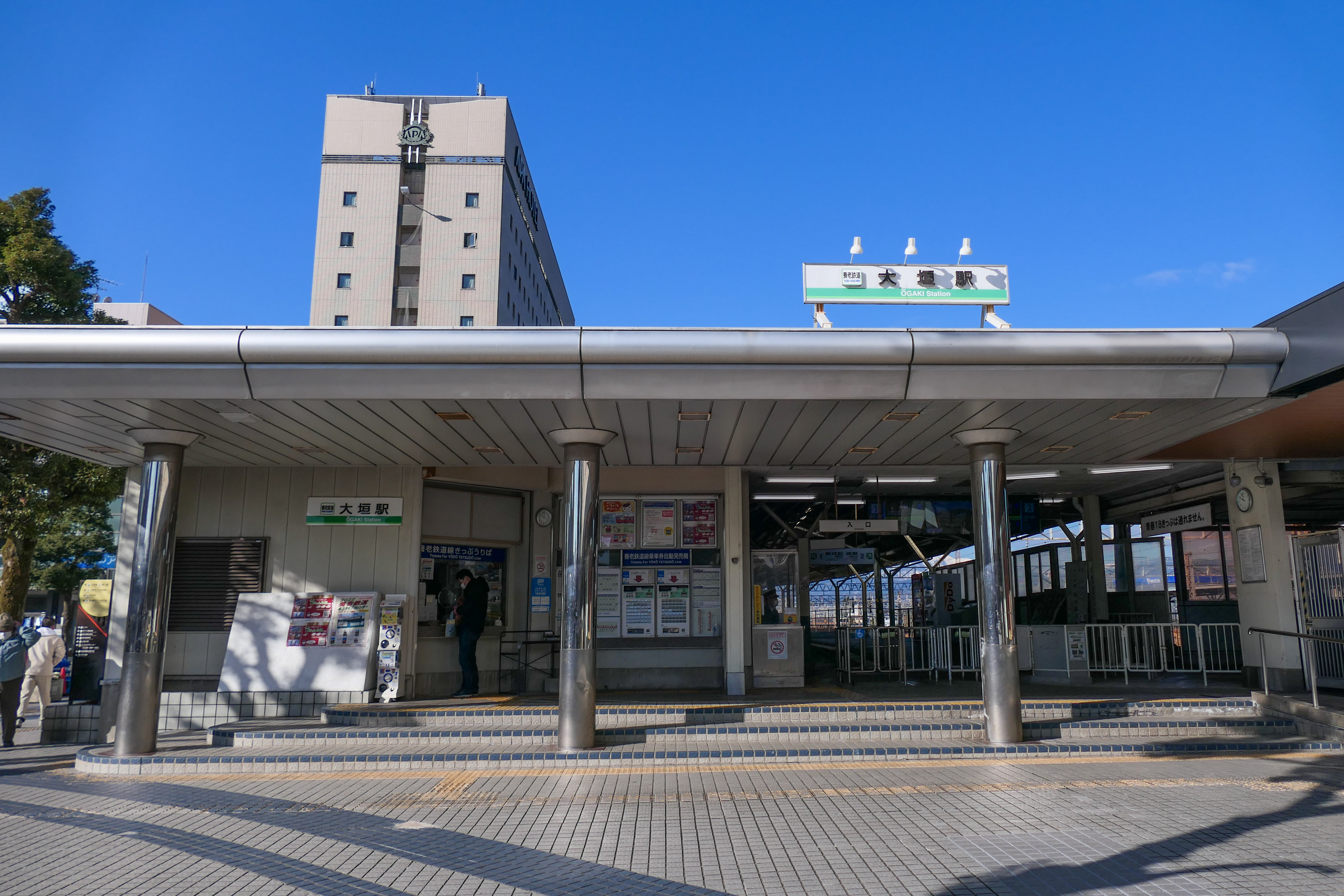

General information
- Location: 1-130-2 Takayacho, Ōgaki-shi, Gifu-ken; Japan
- System: Yōrō Railway station
- Operator: Yōrō Railway
- Line: ■ Yōrō Line
- Distance: 43.0 km from Kuwana
- Platforms: 1 bay platform
- Tracks: 2

Other information
- Status: Staffed

History
- Opened: July 31, 1913

Passengers
- FY2015: 7687
Location

=== Layout ===
The Yōrō Railway station has a single bay platform serving two tracks. The station is staffed.

1	■ Yōrō Line	for Yōrō and Kuwana
2	■ Yōrō Line	for Ibi

=== Adjacent stations ===
«	Service	»
Yōrō Line
Nishi-Ōgaki	-	Muro

=== History ===
The Yōrō Railway station opened on 31 July 1913.

=== Passenger statistics ===
In fiscal 2015, the Yōrō Railway station was used by an average of 7687 passengers daily (boarding passengers only).

== Surrounding area ==
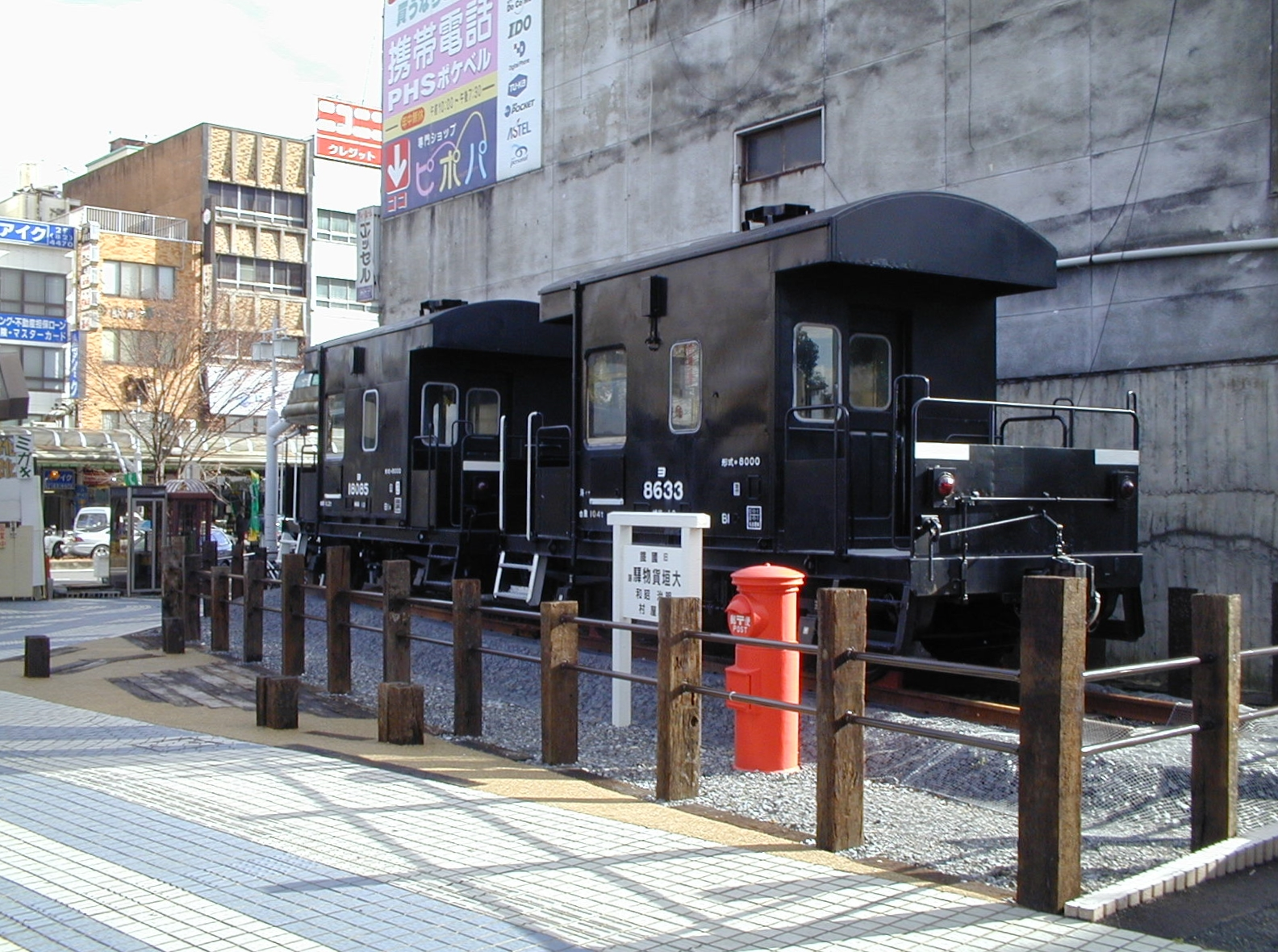
Preserved Yo 8000 brake vans in front of the station in December 2001

- Ōgaki City Hall
- Ōgaki Castle

== See also ==
- List of railway stations in Japan
