= Mino-Hongō Station =

Railway station in Ikeda, Gifu Prefecture, Japan

Mino-Hongō Station 美濃本郷駅
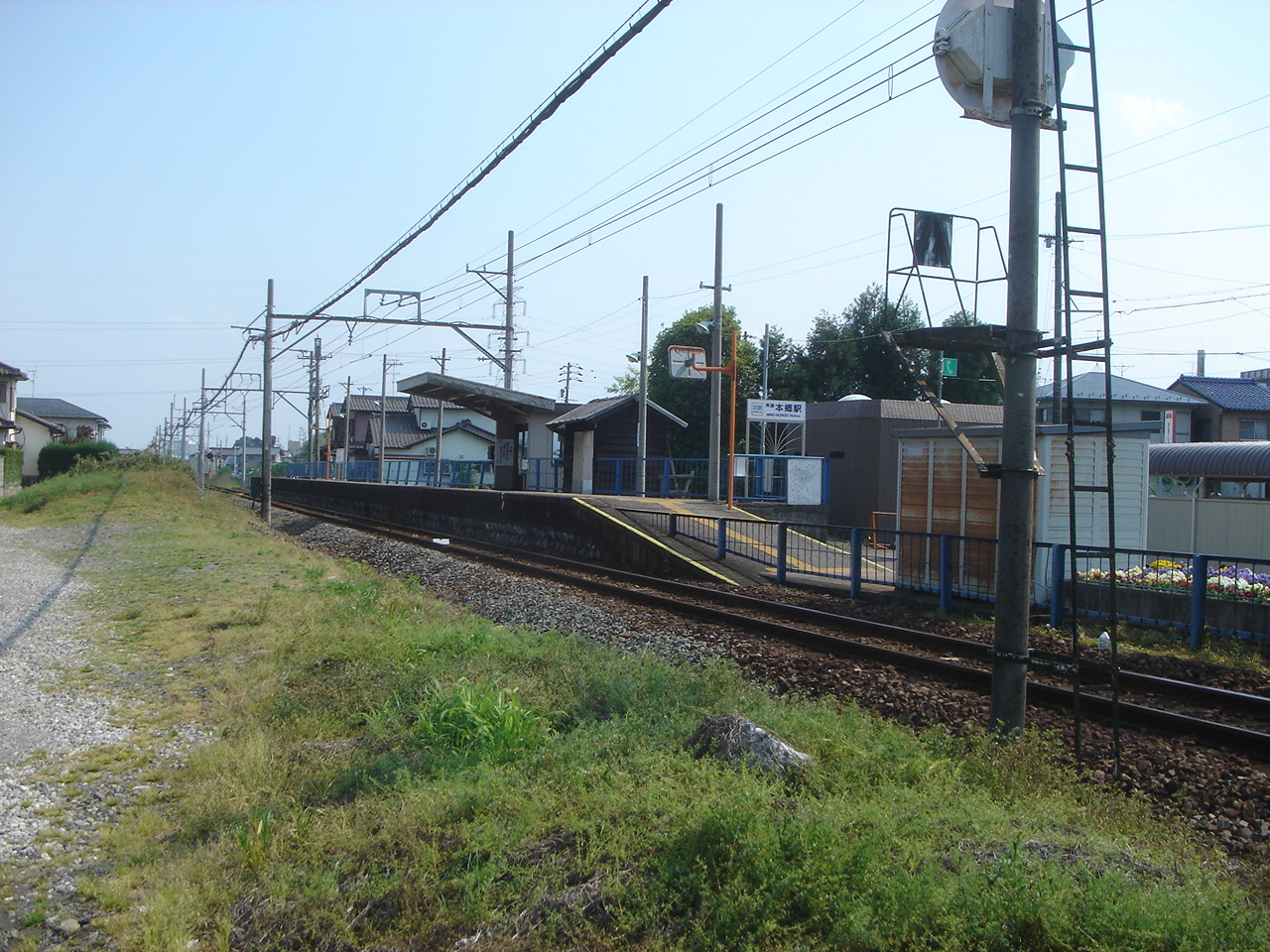
- Mino-Hongō Station in May 2007

General information
- Location: Ikeda-cho Hongo, Ibu-gun, Gifu-ken 503-2417; Japan
- Coordinates: 35.4497°N 136.5719°E
- Operator: Yōrō Railway
- Line: ■ Yōrō Line
- Distance: 55.2 km from Kuwana
- Platforms: 1 side platform
- Tracks: 1

Other information
- Status: Unstaffed
- Website: Official website (in Japanese)

History
- Opened: June 1, 1920

Passengers
- FY2015: 568
Location
- Location within Japan

Mino-Hongō Station (美濃本郷駅, Mino-Hongō-eki) is a railway station in the town of Ikeda, Ibi District, Gifu Prefecture, Japan, operated by the private railway operator Yōrō Railway.

== Lines ==
Mino-Hongō Station is a station on the Yōrō Line, and is located 55.2 kilometres (34.3 mi) from the opposing terminus of the line at Kuwana.

== Station layout ==
Mino-Hongō Station has a single ground-level side platform serving a single bi-directional track. The station is unattended.

== Adjacent stations ==
«	Service	»
Yōrō Railway
Yōrō Line
Kita-Ikeno	-	Ibi

== History ==
Mino-Hongō Station opened on June 1, 1920.

== Passenger statistics ==
In fiscal 2015, the station was used by an average of 568 passengers daily (boarding passengers only).

== Surrounding area ==
- National Route 417

== See also ==
- List of railway stations in Japan
