= Mount Ikeda =

Mountain in Gifu Prefecture, Japan

Coordinates: 35°26′28″N 136°31′01″E

- 池田山
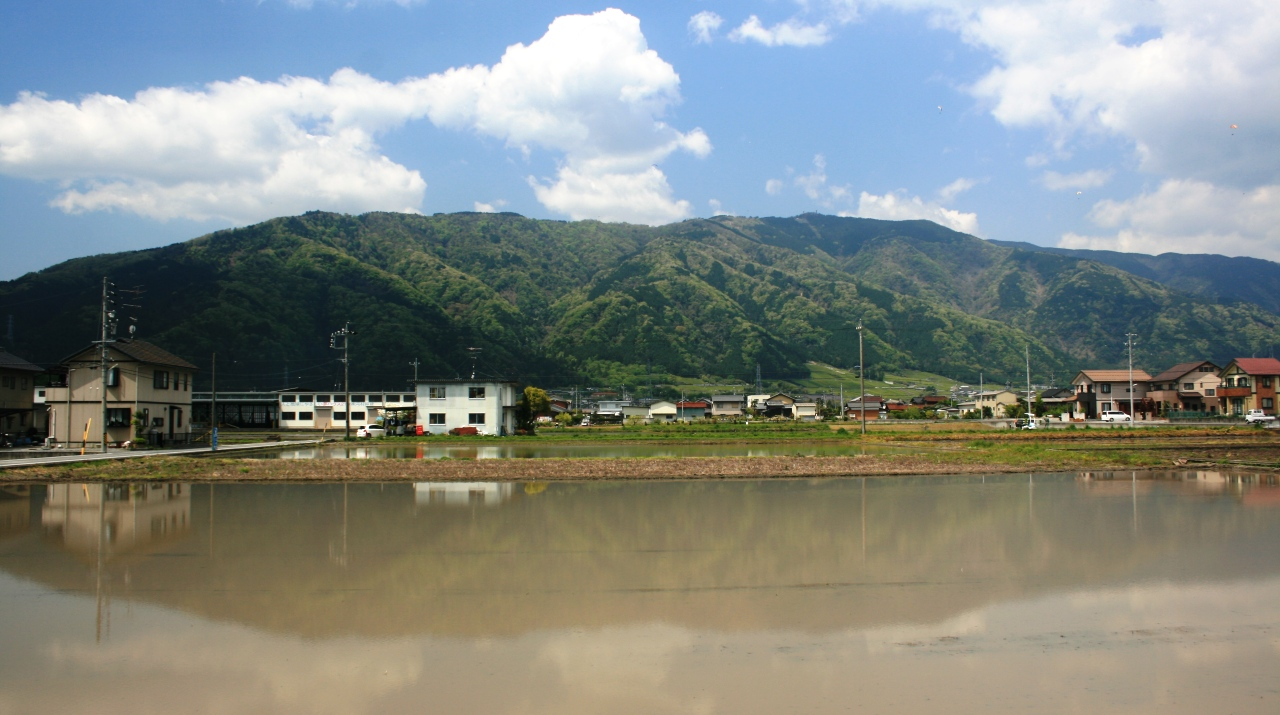
- Mount Ikeda from Ikeda town

Highest point
- Elevation: 923.9 m (3,031 ft)

Geography
- Location: Ikeda, Ibigawa, Gifu Prefecture, Japan
- Parent range: Ibuki Mountains

Mount Ikeda (池田山, Ikeda-san, Ikeda-yama) is a mountain located in the towns of Ikeda and Ibigawa, in Ibi District, Gifu Prefecture, Japan.

== Geography ==
The mountain is 923.9 m (3,031 ft) high and is in the center of the Ibuki Mountains. Mount Ibuki, the namesake of the mountain range, lies to the east-northeast of Mount Ikeda. The mountain is protected as part of the Ibi Sekigahara Yōrō National Park (揖斐関ヶ原養老国定公園).

== Activities ==
Because there are no other mountains to block the view from the eastern side of Mount Ikeda, climbers can easily see the cities of Gifu and Ōgaki in Gifu Prefecture, and Ichinomiya and, if conditions are clear enough, Nagoya in Aichi Prefecture. Because of the clear view, it is one of famed spots for night views in the Tōkai region.

Also, because of the clear space and favorable winds on the eastern side, it is popular for many sky sports, such as hang gliding and paragliding.
