= Kita-Ikeno Station =

Railway station in Ikeda, Gifu Prefecture, Japan

Kita-Ikeno Station 北池野駅
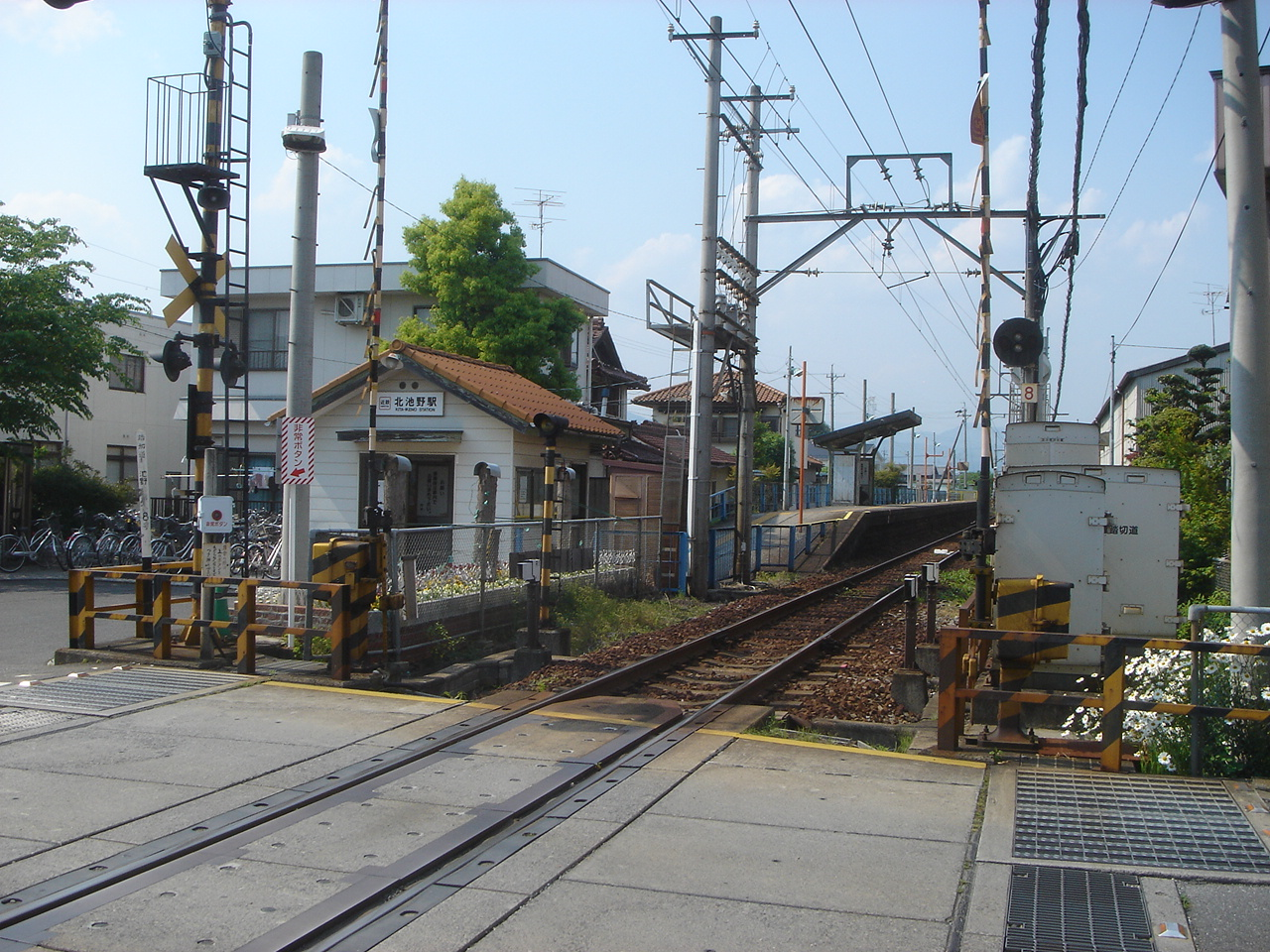
- Kita-Ikeno Station in May 2007

General information
- Location: 1515 Ikeda-cho Hongo, Ibu-gun, Gifu-ken 503-2417; Japan
- Coordinates: 35.4433°N 136.5736°E
- Operator: Yōrō Railway
- Line: ■ Yōrō Line
- Distance: 54.4 km from Kuwana
- Platforms: 1 side platform
- Tracks: 1

Other information
- Status: Unstaffed
- Website: Official website (in Japanese)

History
- Opened: April 1, 1954

Passengers
- FY2015: 515
Location
- Location within Japan

Kita-Ikeno Station (北池野駅, Kita-Ikeno-eki) is a railway station in the town of Ikeda, Ibi District, Gifu Prefecture, Japan, operated by the private railway operator Yōrō Railway.

== Lines ==
Kita-Ikeno Station is a station on the Yōrō Line, and is located 54.4 rail kilometers from the opposing terminus of the line at Kuwana.

== Station layout ==
Kita-Ikeno Station has a single ground-level side platform serving a single bi-directional track. The station is unattended.

== Adjacent stations ==
«	Service	»
Yōrō Railway
Yōrō Line
Ikeno	-	Mino-Hongō

== History ==
Kita-Ikeno Station opened on April 1, 1954.

== Passenger statistics ==
In fiscal 2015, the station was used by an average of 515 passengers daily (boarding passengers only).

== Surrounding area ==
- Ikeda Town Hall
- Ikeda post Office
- National Route 417

== See also ==
- List of railway stations in Japan
