= Kechibi =

Legendary atmospheric ghost light

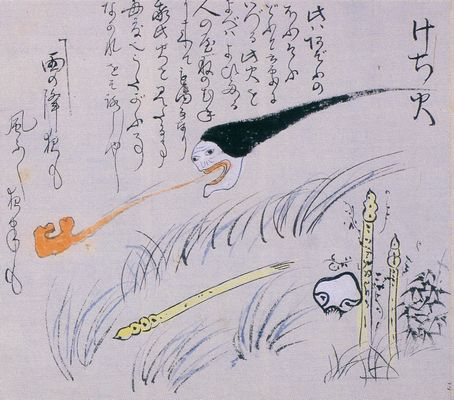
"Kechibi from the Tosa Obake Zōshi, author unknown

Kechibi (けち火) is an atmospheric ghost light told in the legends of Kōchi Prefecture.

== Outline ==
It is stated to be the onryō of humans turned into balls of fire, and it is said to be possible to beckon for it by beating a zōri three times, or putting saliva on the zōri and calling for it. It is also said that the face of a human floats in the fire.

They are also said to appear above water, and from this they are sometimes called a type of funayūrei. In the Nara Prefecture, they are sometimes seen to be the same as the kaika janjanbi.

According to the folklore researcher Rinichihara Ichihara's book, they are largely split into two different kinds, the ones that come forth from the flesh the instant a human dies, and those that come from humans while they sleep.

As an example of the latter, there was a folktale as follows from the Kami Distrinct, Kōchi Prefecture (now Kami) from the early Meiji period. When a man called Yoshiyan was walking through the road at night, beside the Monobe River, there was a kechibi turned over on the roadside. Upon coming closer to it, it would start rolling around, and when he chased it due to curiosity, the kechibi would also run away, and eventually he found himself entering a person's home. In that home, a man who was having a nightmare woke up, and said to his wife, "Yoshiyan was chasing me, so I ran away desperately."

Also, as a folktale in the Takaoka District also from the Meiji Period, a man with much bravery named Kumaani Saitō witnessed a kechibi, and when he shouted, "come fly over here," it flew right in front of him. Saitō attempted to catch the fire alive, but each time he tried to catch it in his hand or tread on it with his feet the kechibi would disappear, and then reappear over and over. He finally captured it in both hands and took it back to his home, but at his home, when he opened his hand, the kechibi had already disappeared before he knew it. The next day, Kumaani had a fever of unknown cause, and died just like that.

In the Tosa Obake Zōshi (author unknown), a Yōkai Emaki from the Tosa Province (now Kōchi Prefecture) in the Edo period, it was written as 鬼火 and had furigana indicating a reading of "kechibi".

== See also ==
- List of legendary creatures from Japan
- Will-o'-the-wisp
