= Tenka (atmospheric ghost light) =

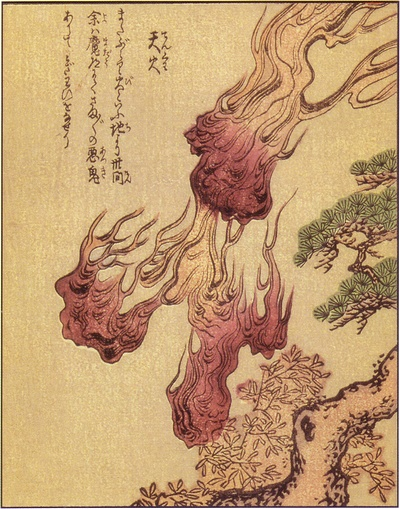
"Tenka" from the Ehon Hyaku Monogatari by Shunsen Takehara

Tenka (天火) are a type of atmospheric ghost light told about in various areas of Japan. It is written about in the collection of fantastic stories, the Ehon Hyaku Monogatari from the Edo period and in the essay Kasshi Yawa by Seizan Matsuura and other writings, but it is also told as the folklore of various areas.

== Folklore ==
In the Atsumi District, Aichi Prefecture, when one's path ahead when on a road at night becomes bright like at noon, it is called a "tenbi" (天火), and in the Ibi District, Gifu Prefecture, the mysterious fires that make a great noise in the evening sky in the summer and fly are called "tenpi" (天火).

In the Higashimatsuura District, Saga Prefecture, the weather became better once a tenka appeared, but the homes it entered were stricken by illness, so it is said that they are beaten by a kane and driven out.

In the Tamana District, Kumamoto Prefecture, it is a mysterious fire that falls from the heavens and has a size about that of a paper lantern. It is said that a conflagration results when it falls on the roof of a house. In the Saga Prefecture region, they were thought of as a premonition for a conflagration, and were detested.

It is said that tenka were once thought of as a type of vengeful spirit (onryō), and in the document on folk customs "Amakusatō Minzokushi" from the Amakusa islands, Kumamoto Prefecture, there is the following legend. A certain man went to Oniike village (now Amakusa city) to fish, but the villagers treated him as an outsider and treated him ill, and due to that, he died from an illness. From then on, a ball of fire came flying in Oniike every evening, and moved on to burn a brush, and without even a chance for the villages to try to extinguish the fire, it spread, and completely burned down the houses of the village. The villagers feared this as the deed of that man's vengeful spirit, and built a jizō at the place where he was ill-treated, and it is said that his spirit is mourned for every winter.

When a tenka flies, there is the theory that it makes a "shan shan" sound like the janjanbi of the Nara Prefecture, and thus it is also called a "shanshanbi" in the Tosa Province (now Kōchi Prefecture).

== Classics ==
According to the "Kasshi Yawa", when the people of Saga found a tenka and left it alone, their homes caught on fire, so it was driven away by gathering around and reciting a Buddhist prayer, causing the tenka to change its direction and flee. At the end, in the suburbs, it disappeared in the middle of vegetation.

Also, it is said that tenka could be driven away by fanning them with a setta (a type of sandal), and in the collection of fantastic stories "Fude no Susabi" from the Ansei period, there was one that told about someone in the Hizen Province who lost their home due to a fire and "the fire fell on someone else's home, and the resident of that home used a setta to drive away that fire, resulting in my home catching on fire instead, so I'd like for the residents of that home to pay the expenses for a new home", and implored for a settlement from the daikan (administrators of the Edo period).

In the collection of fantastic stories "Ehon Hyaku Monogatari" from the Edo period, it was written about as "tenka" (天火), and according to this, there are those here and there who die by fire when their homes catch on fire. According fantastic story from this same piece of writing, there was a heartless daikan at a certain place, and due to his selfish desires, he ill-treated his subordinates, and got a bad reputation even among his superiors, and when he came down from his seat of daikan next month, a fire came from somewhere that should have had no trace of fire at all burned his house, and he also died from the fire, and all the gold and silver, treasures, and clothing turned to smoke in a flash. When this fire occurred, it is said that someone witnessed the sight of a lump of fire falling from the sky.

== See also ==
- List of legendary creatures from Japan
