= Ikeno Station =

Railway station in Ikeda, Gifu Prefecture, Japan

Ikeno Station 池野駅
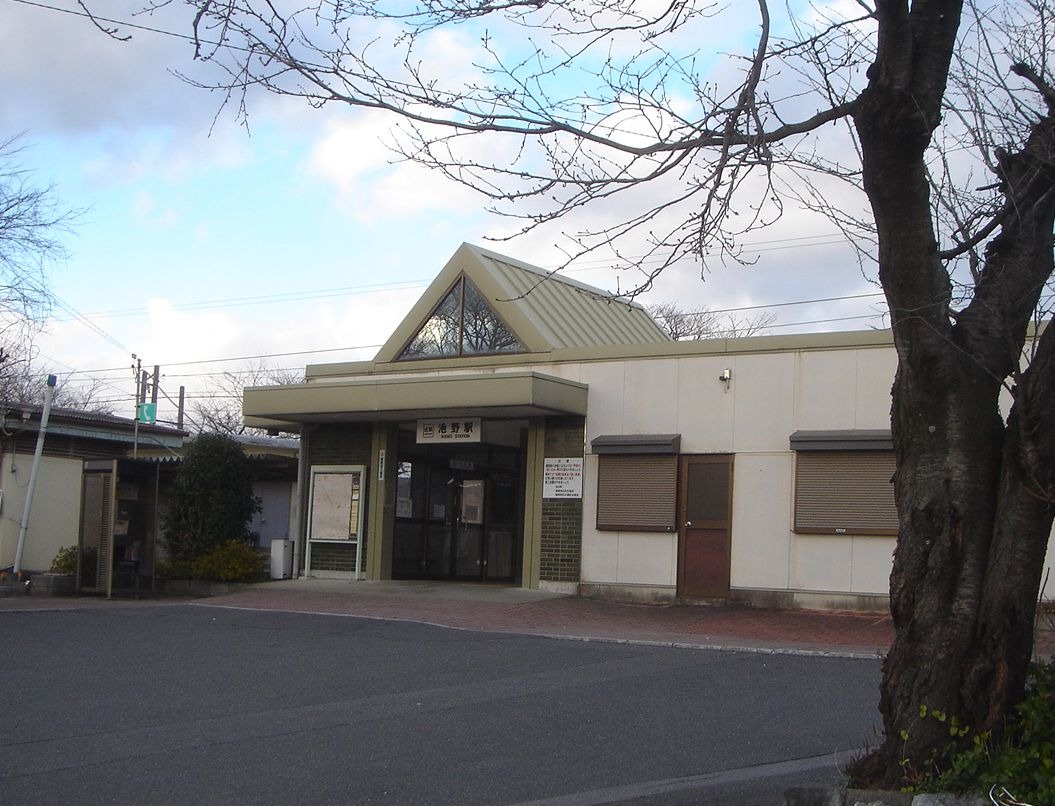
- Ikeno Station in February 2007

General information
- Location: 259-4 Ikeda-cho Ikeno, Ibu-gun, Gifu-ken 503-2424; Japan
- Coordinates: 35.4364°N 136.5785°E
- Operator: Yōrō Railway
- Line: ■ Yōrō Line
- Distance: 53.5 km from Kuwana
- Platforms: 2 side platforms
- Tracks: 2

Other information
- Status: Unstaffed
- Website: Official website (in Japanese)

History
- Opened: July 31, 1913

Passengers
- FY2015: 842
Location
- Location within Japan

Ikeno Station (池野駅, Ikeno-eki) is a railway station in the town of Ikeda, Ibi District, Gifu Prefecture, Japan, operated by the private railway operator Yōrō Railway.

== Lines ==
Ikeno Station is a station on the Yōrō Line, and is located 53.5 rail kilometers from the opposing terminus of the line at Kuwana.

== Station layout ==
Ikeno Station has two opposed ground-level side platforms connected by a level crossing. The station is unattended.

=== Platforms ===
station side	■ Yōrō Line	for Ibi
opp side	■ Yōrō Line	for Ōgaki, Yōrō and Kuwana

== Adjacent stations ==
«	Service	»
Yōrō Railway
Yōrō Line
Kita-Gōdo	-	Kita-Ikeno

== History ==
Ikeno Station opened on July 31, 1913.

== Passenger statistics ==
In fiscal 2015, the station was used by an average of 842 passengers daily (boarding passengers only).

== Surrounding area ==
- National Route 417
- Ikeda High School
- Ikeda Onsen

== See also ==
- List of railway stations in Japan
