= Takashina Station =

Railway station in Ibigawa, Gifu Prefecture, Japan

Takashina Station 高科駅
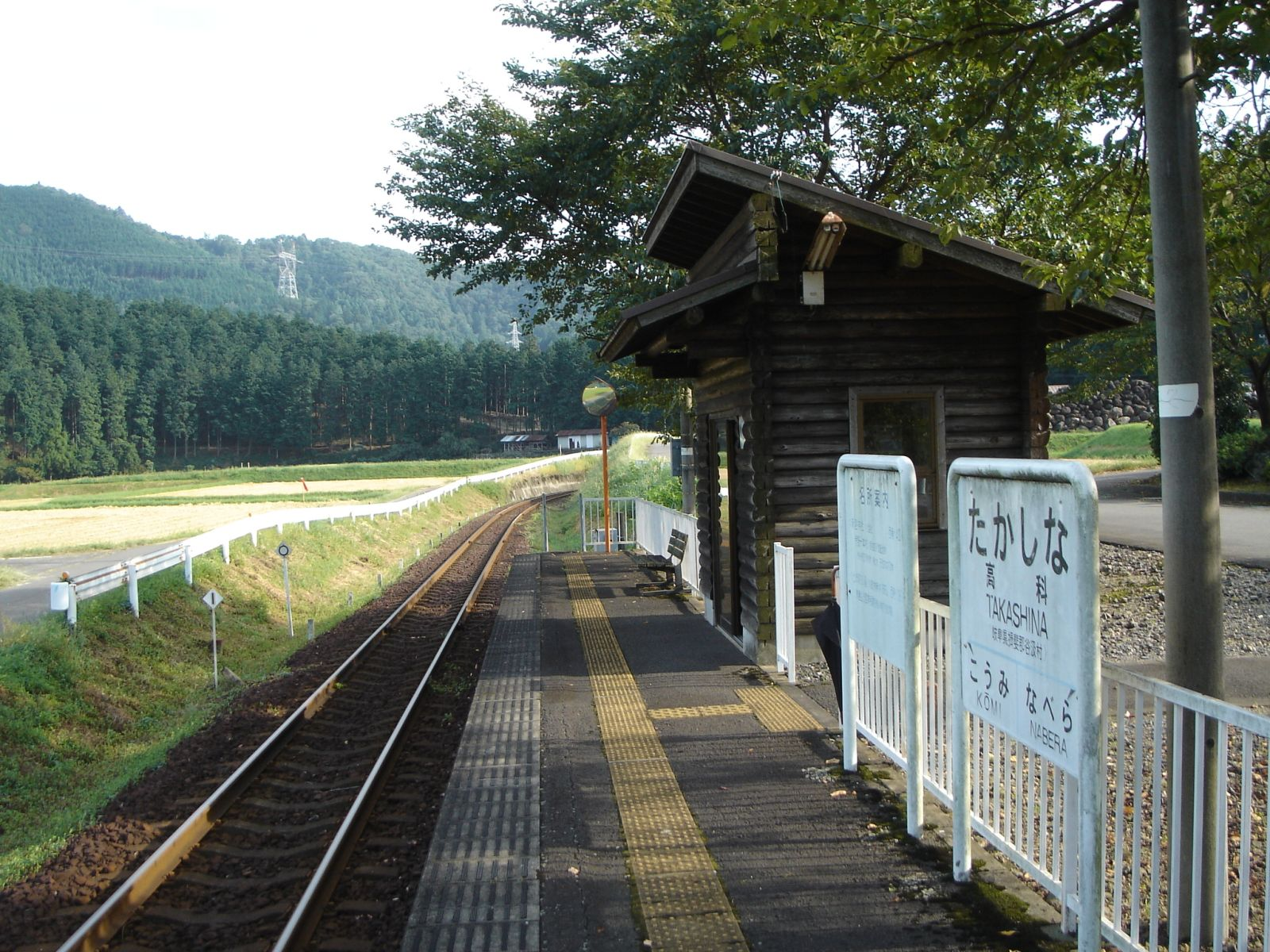
- Takashina Station in 2008

General information
- Location: Tanigumitakashina, Ibigawa-cho, Ibi-gun, Gifu-ken 501-1301; Japan
- Coordinates: 35°33′20.34″N 136°38′24.20″E
- Operator: Tarumi Railway
- Line: ■ Tarumi Line
- Distance: 25.2 km from Ōgaki
- Platforms: 1 side platform
- Tracks: 1

Other information
- Status: Unstaffed
- Website: Official website (in Japanese)

History
- Opened: March 25, 1989
Location
- Location within Gifu Prefecture Location within Japan

Takashina Station (高科駅, Takashina-eki) is a railway station in the town of Ibigawa, Ibi District, Gifu Prefecture, Japan, operated by the private railway operator Tarumi Railway.

== Lines ==
Takashina Station is a station on the Tarumi Line, and is located 25.2 rail kilometers from the opposing terminus of the line at Ōgaki.

== Station layout ==
Takashina Station has one ground-level side platform serving a single bi-directional track. The station is unattended.

== Adjacent stations ==
«	Service	»
Tarumi Railway
Tarumi Line
Kōmi	-	Nabera

== History ==
Takashina Station opened on March 25, 1989.

== Surrounding area ==
- National Route 157

== See also ==
- List of railway stations in Japan
