= Janjanbi =

Folkloric phenomenon in Japan

Janjanbi (じゃんじゃん火 or ジャンジャン火) is an atmospheric ghost light told about the legends of various places in the Nara Prefecture. They are considered a type of onibi. In the Miyazaki Prefecture they are also called musabi (むさ火) and in the Kōchi Prefecture, they are called kechibi.

== Outline ==
Their name comes from the "janjan" sound that they make. Also in Nara, there are different legends depending on the area, and different alternate names depending on the area.

Byakugō-ji town, Nara city
It indicates two balls of fire that appear in the graveyard of Byakugō-ji and Daian-ji. In the Fūfu River, the two balls of fire would meet together, intertwine themselves, and then finally return to their graves.
When a person sees this fire, it would come closer to that person, and even when those who are chased by the janjanbi flee into the middle of a pond, the fire would still follow them above the pond.
They are said in the legends to be a man and a woman who committed double suicide, and since they were buried in separate temples after death, they became balls of fire that meet together.
Yamatokōriyama
It indicates two hitodama that would visit every year on June 7th on the bridge above the Saho River. Just like the ones from Byakugō-ji town, they are also the spirits of a man and a woman.
It was said that there was previously a custom when it was June 7th for 20 men and women to be selected from each of the surrounding villages and dance above the bridge where they appear frequently, in order to console the spirit of the hitodama.
Fujichō, Tenri
It indicates a ball of fire that would appear from the remains of a castle and fly westward. For those who encounter this, it would be necessary for them to hide under a bridge and wait for it to pass. It is also called Zannenbi (残念火, lit. "disappointment fire").

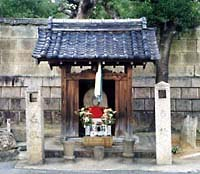
The Kubikiri Jizō in Tainoshōchō, Tenri

Yanagimotochō and Tainoshōchō, Tenri, and Kashihara
On a summer night when rain is near, by turning toward the Tōichi castle and saying "hoi hoi", it would come flying, make the sound "jan jan" and then disappear. It is also called the hoihoibi (ホイホイ火).
It is considered to be the onryō of the military commander Tōtada Tōichi who was slain by Matsunaga Danjō in the Azuchi–Momoyama period, and those who see it would, by the onryō's curse, become sick with fever for three days and nights. When Tōtada was slain, the killed soldiers all said "zannen, zannen (disappointment, disappointment)" as a crowd of voices, which is why it was heard as "jan jan".
Also, in Tainoshōchō, Tenri, there is a jizō with its head separated called the "kubikiri jizō (decapitated jizō)", but it is said that a soldier who was being attacked by the janjanbi in the past swung his sword around and mistakenly cut off the head of a jizō by the roadside. It was said that, in the end, that soldier died completely burning.
