= No Kofun Cluster =

Cluster of kofun burial mounds in Ōno, Chūbu, Japan

No Kofun Group
- 野古墳群 (Japanese)
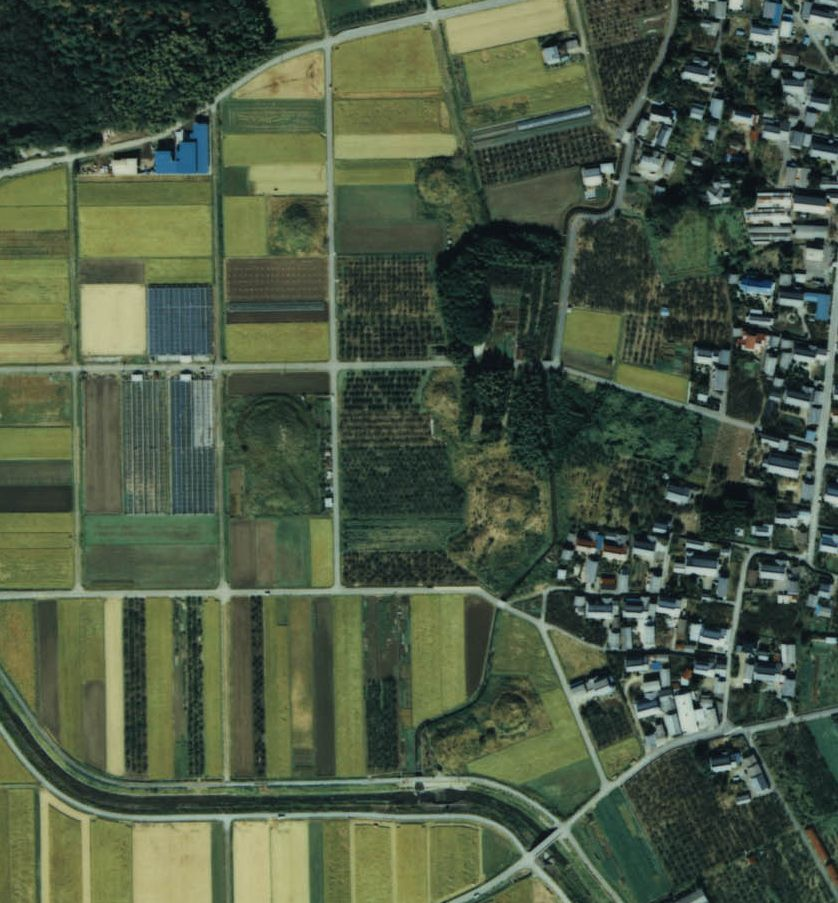
- No Kofun Group

- No Kofun No Kofun Cluster (Japan)
- 35°28′48″N 136°37′31″E
- Type: kofun
- Periods: Kofun period
- Location: Ōno, Gifu, Japan
- Region: Chūbu region

History
- Built: late 5th to early 6th century AD

Site notes
- Public access: Yes (no public facilities)

The No Kofun Group (野古墳群, No Kofun-gun) is cluster of small kofun burial mounds located in the Ono neighborhood of the town of Ōno, Ibi District, Gifu Prefecture in the Chūbu region of Japan. The site was designated a National Historic Site of Japan in 1957.

== Overview ==
The kofun group is located in the northwestern corner of the Nōbi Plain in northwestern Gifu Prefecture, surrounded by rice fields and orchards. In a roughly one square kilometer area, there were once over 200 tumuli, of which 14 theoretically received protection in 1957 as a National Historic Site. These included 27 keyhole-shaped tumuli (zenpō-kōen-fun (前方後円墳)), which are shaped like a keyhole, having one square end and one circular end, when viewed from above, or the similarly-shaped "scallop-type" kofun hotategai-gata-kofun (帆立貝形古墳)). At present, only nine remain; with the others being destroyed for expansion of farm land. Of these remaining nine, eight have been excavated, and from the grave goods recovered (haniwa, bronze mirrors, horse fittings, iron and wooden implements, iron swords and spearheads), were determined to date to the middle of the 5th century to the early part of the 6th century AD. One of the bronze mirrors is kept at the Gotoh Museum in Tokyo. The site is about eight minutes by car from Motosu Station on the Tarumi Railway Tarumi Line.

#	Name	photo	type & Dimensions	Comments
1	Motare Kofun (モタレ古墳)		keyhole-shaped 54m (L) x 36m (D) x 6m (H)	Originally thought to be circular, excavations in 1989 confirmed that it was a moated keyhole-shaped tomb. Fragments of haniwa, Sue ware and a wooden plough were recovered.
2	Fudozuka Kofun (不動塚古墳)		keyhole-shaped 64m (L) x 44m (D) x 7m (H)	Excavations in 1989 found fragments of haniwa; most of the mound has been lost
3	Minamiyashiki-nishi Kofun (南屋敷西古墳)		keyhole-shaped 76m (L) x 44m (D) x 5.4m (H)	Excavations in 1982 found that it was double-moated; fragments of cylindrical haniwa were found
4	Noborikoshi Kofun (墳登越古墳)		keyhole-shaped 83m (L) x 52m (D) x 7.3m (H)	The largest in the group. It was double-moated; fragments of cylindrical haniwa were found
5	Jōtsuka Kofun (城塚古墳)		keyhole-shaped 75m (L) x 39m (D) x 6.2m (H)	In excavations, a Chinese-made bronze mirror, horse harness and a large sword were found in the burial chamber.
6	Inui Yashiki Kofun (乾屋敷古墳)		keyhole-shaped 79m (L) x 49m (D) x 6.3m (H)	Thought to be the oldest in the group. Half-destroyed by residential housing; some haniwa have been recovered.
7	-unnamed-		scallop-shaped 29m (L) x 22.6m (D) x 4.2m (H)	Thought to be a circular tumuli, its design was confirmed in 1923.
8	-unnamed-		square-shaped 15.8 (L) x 15.8m (D) x 3.0m (H)	Excavated in 1994
9	-unnamed-		keyhole-shaped 30.5 (L) x 23m (D) x 6m (H)	Excavated in 1994, haniwa, Sue pottery were uncovered.

== See also ==
- List of Historic Sites of Japan (Gifu)
