= Ikeda, Gifu =

Ikeda 池田町
- Town
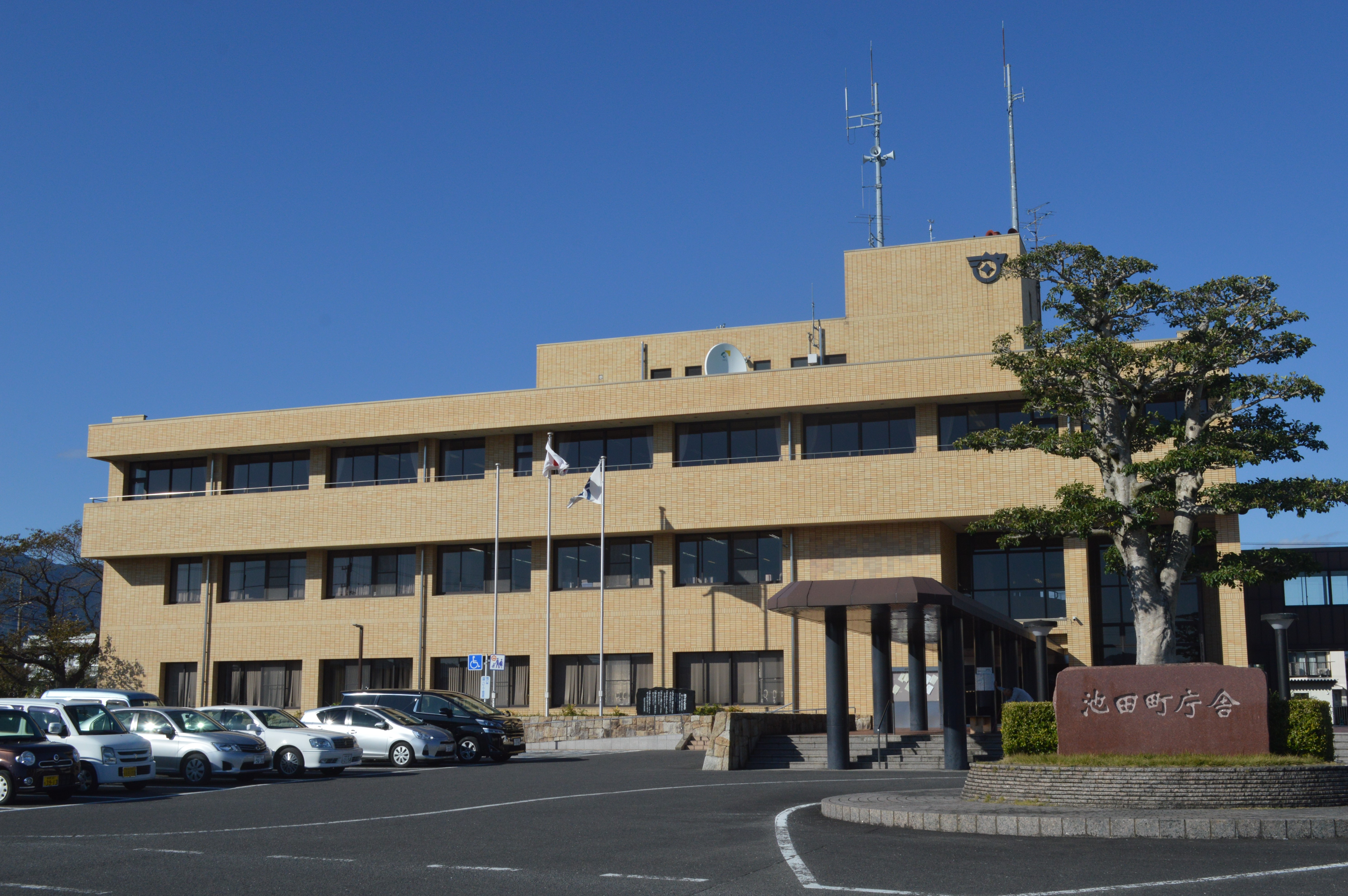
- Ikeda Town Hall

- Flag Seal

- Location of Ikeda in Gifu Prefecture

- Coordinates: 35°26′32.1″N 136°34′22.7″E
- Country: Japan
- Region: Chūbu
- Prefecture: Gifu
- District: Ibi

Government
  - Mayor: Kazuo Okazaki

Area
  - Total: 38.80 km^{2} (14.98 sq mi)

Population (December 1, 2018)
  - Total: 24,034
  - Density: 619.4/km^{2} (1,604/sq mi)
- Time zone: UTC+9 (Japan Standard Time)
- City symbols
- Tree: Camellia sinensis
- Flower: yamazakura
- Phone number: 0585-45-3111
- Address: Rokunoi 1468-1, Ikeda-chō, Ibi-gun, Gifu-ken 503-2492
- Website: Official website (in Japanese)

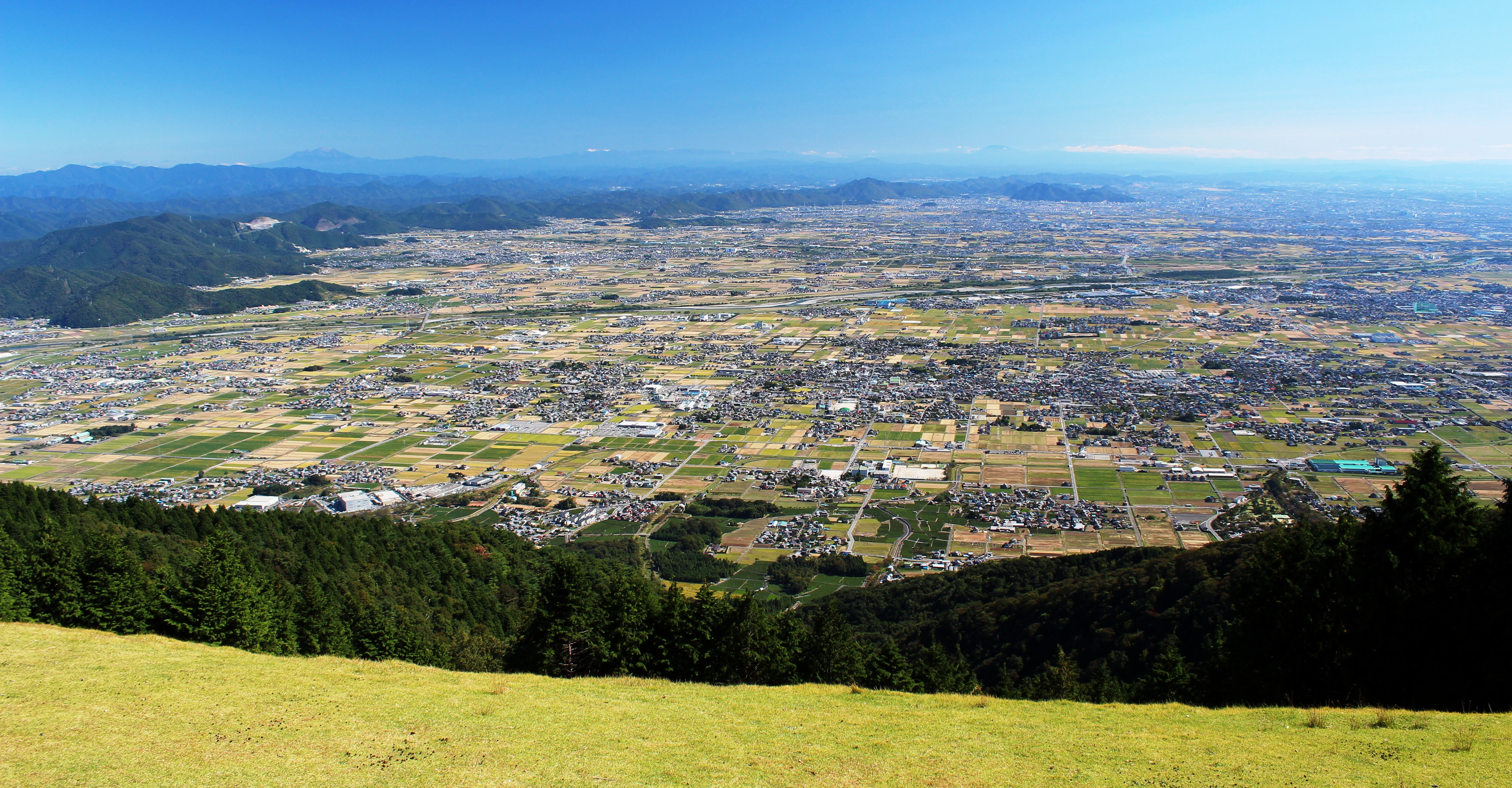
Ikeda, Gifu from Mount Ikeda

Ikeda (池田町, Ikeda-chō) is a town located in Ibi District, Gifu Prefecture, Japan. As of 1 December 2018, the town had an estimated population of 24,034 in 8291 households and a population density of 620 persons per km^{2}. The total area of the town was 38.80 square kilometres (14.98 sq mi).

== Geography ==
Ikeda is located in southwestern Gifu Prefecture. The Ibi River flows through the town, which is hilly to mountainous in the west, including Mount Ikeda on the border with the neighbouring town of Ibigawa. Parts of the town are within the borders of the Ibi-Sekigahara-Yōrō Quasi-National Park. The town has a climate characterized by hot and humid summers, and mild winters (Köppen climate classification Cfa). The average annual temperature in Ikeda is 15.0 °C. The average annual rainfall is 1991 mm with September as the wettest month. The temperatures are highest on average in August, at around 27.5 °C, and lowest in January, at around 3.6 °C.

=== Neighbouring municipalities ===
- Gifu Prefecture
  - Gōdo
  - Ibigawa
  - Ōgaki
  - Ōno
  - Tarui

== Demographics ==
Per Japanese census data, the population of Ikeda has recently plateaued after a long period of growth.

Historical population
Year	Pop.	±%
1970	16,235	—
1980	20,672	+27.3%
1990	21,987	+6.4%
2000	23,820	+8.3%
2010	24,980	+4.9%
2020	23,360	−6.5%

== History ==
The area around Ibigawa was part of traditional Mino Province. During the Edo period, it was part of Ikeda District and was divided between territory controlled by Ōgaki Domain and tenryō holdings directly controlled by the Tokugawa shogunate. During the post-Meiji Restoration cadastral reforms, the area was organised into Ibi District, Gifu Prefecture. The village of Ikeda was formed on July 1, 1897, with the merger of the villages of Ikeno, Ueda, Shimohigashino, Sunabata, Rokunoi, and Sugino. Ikega merged with neighbouring Rokugō and Hongō in 1950 and was raised to town status on May 1, 1954. Ikeda annexed neighbouring Yahata and Miaji on April 1, 1955.

== Education ==
Ikeda has five public elementary schools and one public middle school operated by the town government. The town has one public high school operated by the Gifu Prefectural Board of Education.

== Transportation ==
=== Railway ===
- Yōrō Railway Yōrō Line
  - Ikeno - Kita-Ikeno - Mino-Hongō

=== Highway ===
National Route 417

== Local attractions ==
- Mount Ikeda
