= Ibuki Mountains =

Mountain range in Gifu Prefecture, Japan

Coordinates: 35°25′04″N 136°24′22″E

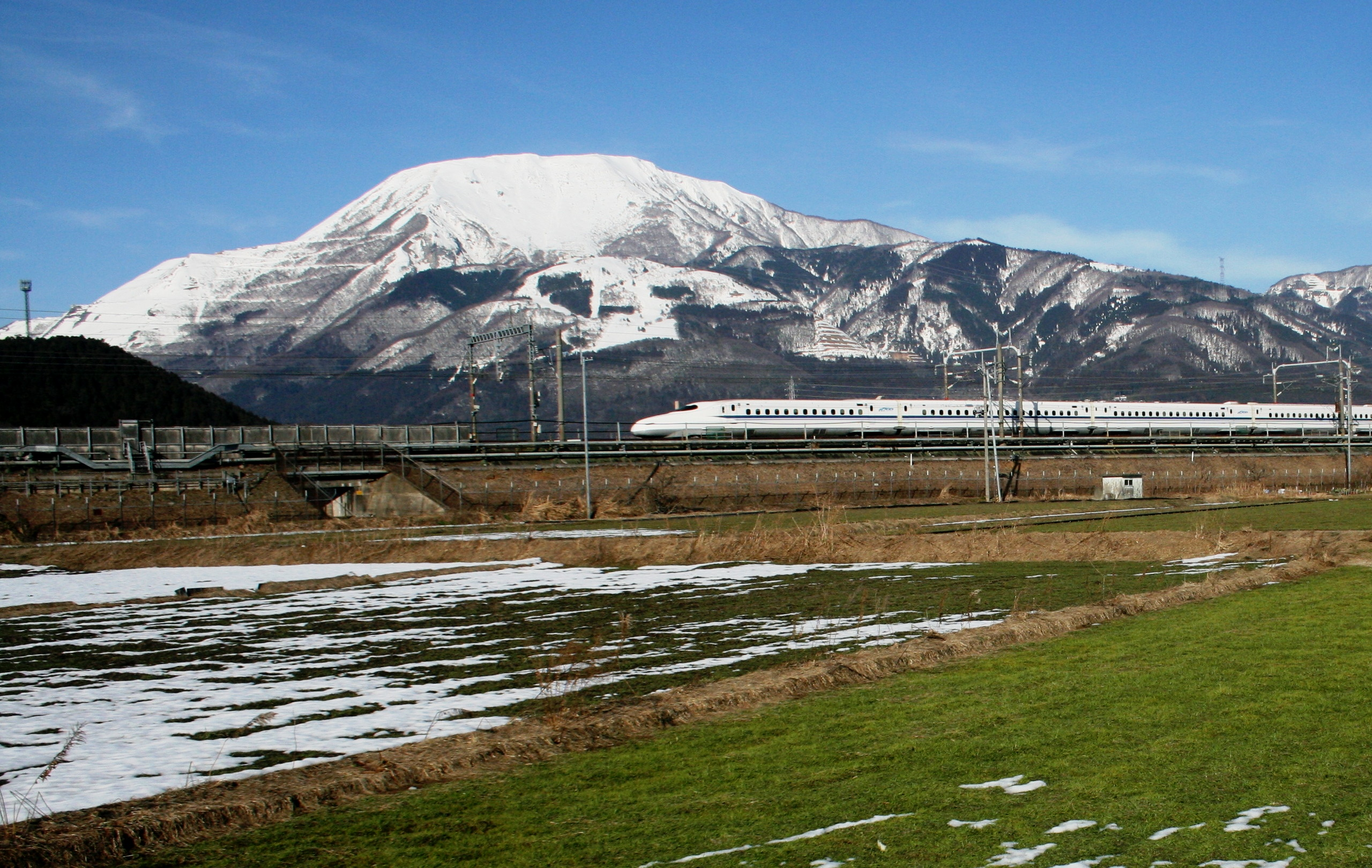
Mount Ibuki

The Ibuki Mountains (伊吹山地, Ibuki Sanchi) are a mountain range straddling the border between Gifu and Shiga prefectures in Japan. After lowering and nearly disappearing in Shiga Prefecture, the range continues as the Suzuka Mountains. During the winter, the winds from the Ibuki Mountains are a cause of much of the snowfall on the Nōbi Plain covering Gifu and Aichi prefectures. The Ane River originates in the Ibuki Mountains.

The range is named after Mount Ibuki, the highest peak in the range at an elevation of 1377 meters above sea-level. Mount Kinka, Mount Dodo, Mount Kanmuri, and Mount Dainichi are some other notable peaks in the range.

Mount Ibuki is a popular destination among climbers and hikers. The mountain's base is easily reachable by private or public transportation. To the west of the mountain is another interesting place, Biwa lake.

== Peaks ==
- Mount Ibuki, 1,377 m (4,518 ft)
- Mount Ikeda, 924 m (3,031 ft)
- Mount Kanakuso (金糞岳 Kanakuso-dake), 1,317 m (4,321 ft)
- Mount Kaitsuki (貝月岳 Kaitsuki-dake), 1,234 m (4,049 ft)
- Mount Kunimi (国見岳 Kunimi-dake), 1,123 m (3,684 ft)

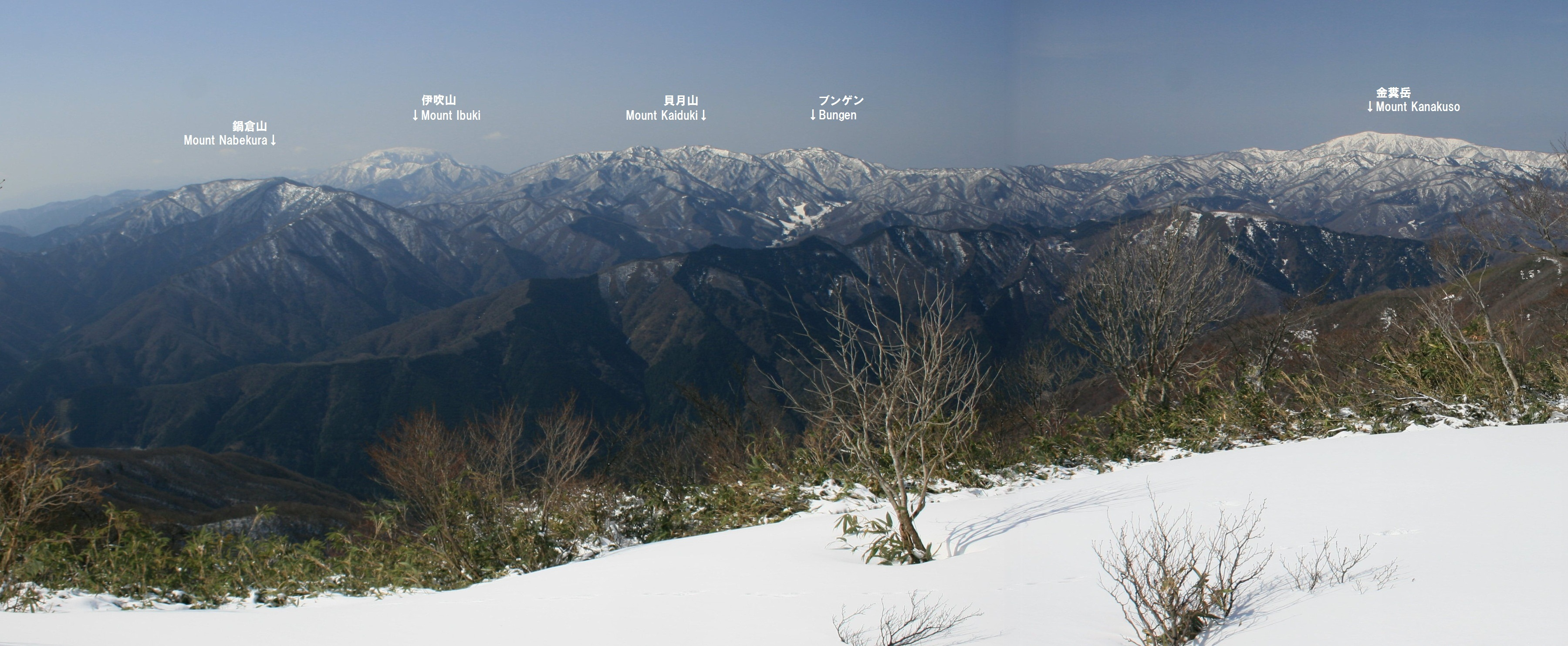
A panoramic view of the peaks in the Ibuki Range.

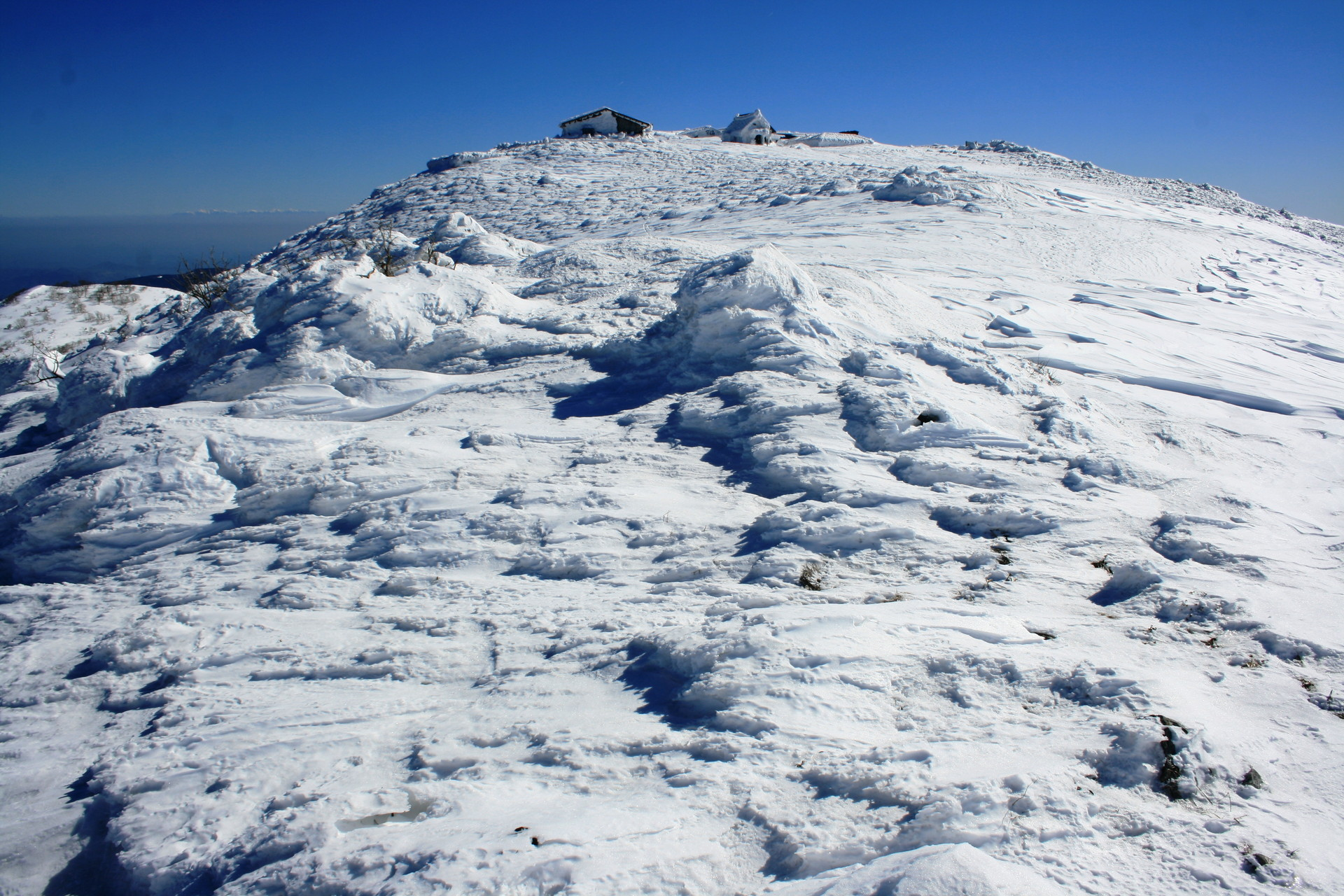
Mount Ibuki's summit

== See also ==
- Geography of Japan
