= Ōno, Gifu =

Ōno 大野町
- Town
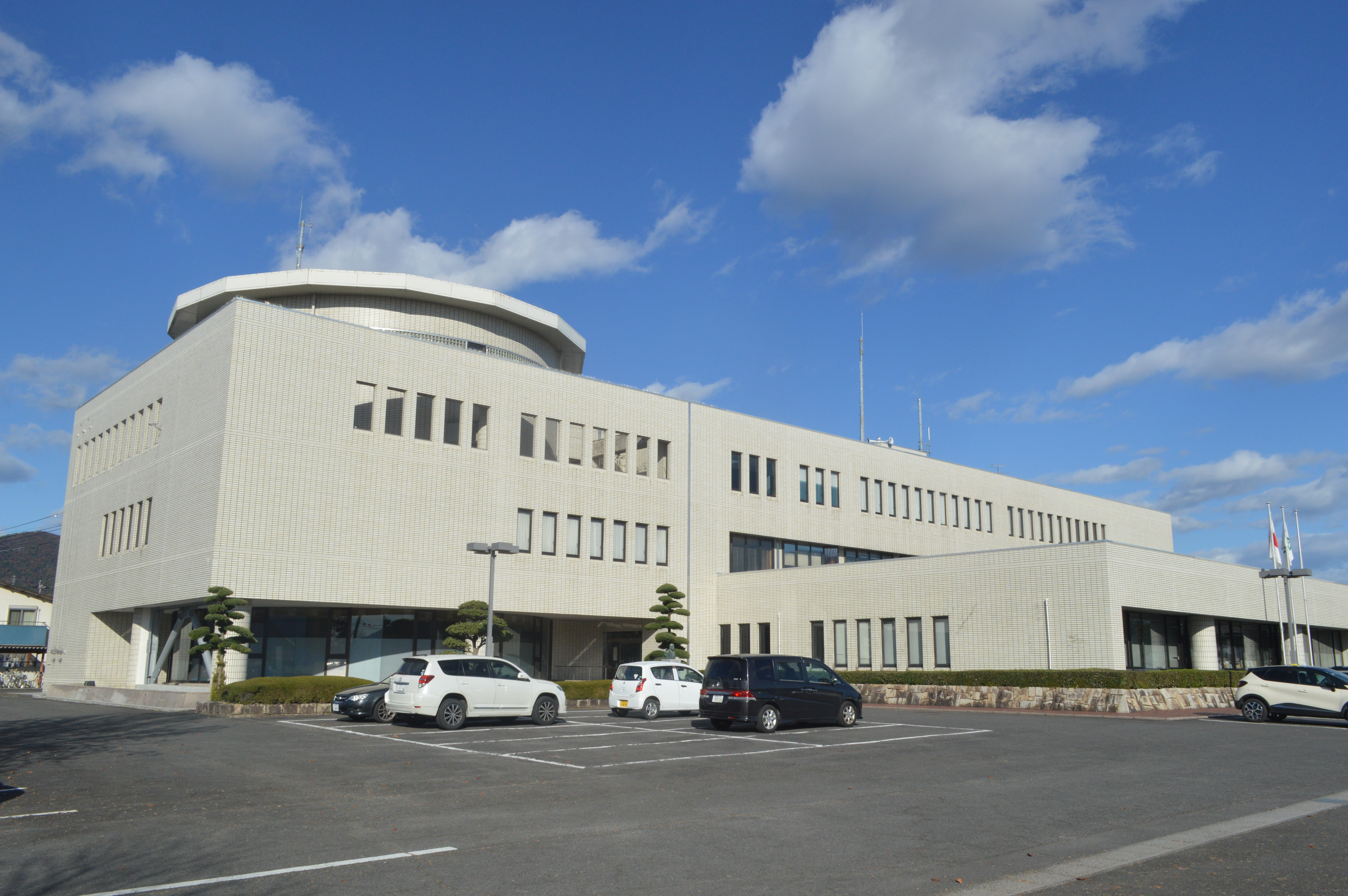
- Ōno Town Hall

- Flag Seal

- Location of Ōno in Gifu Prefecture

- Coordinates: 35°28′14.2″N 136°37′39.2″E
- Country: Japan
- Region: Chūbu
- Prefecture: Gifu
- District: Ibi

Government
  - Mayor: Kōzō Usami

Area
  - Total: 34.20 km^{2} (13.20 sq mi)

Population (December 1, 2018)
  - Total: 23,111
  - Density: 675.8/km^{2} (1,750/sq mi)
- Time zone: UTC+9 (Japan Standard Time)
- City symbols
- Tree: Maple
- Flower: Rhododendron, Rose
- Phone number: 0585-22-2111
- Address: Ōaza Ōno 80, Ōno-chō, Ibi-gun, Gifu-ken 501-0592
- Website: Official website

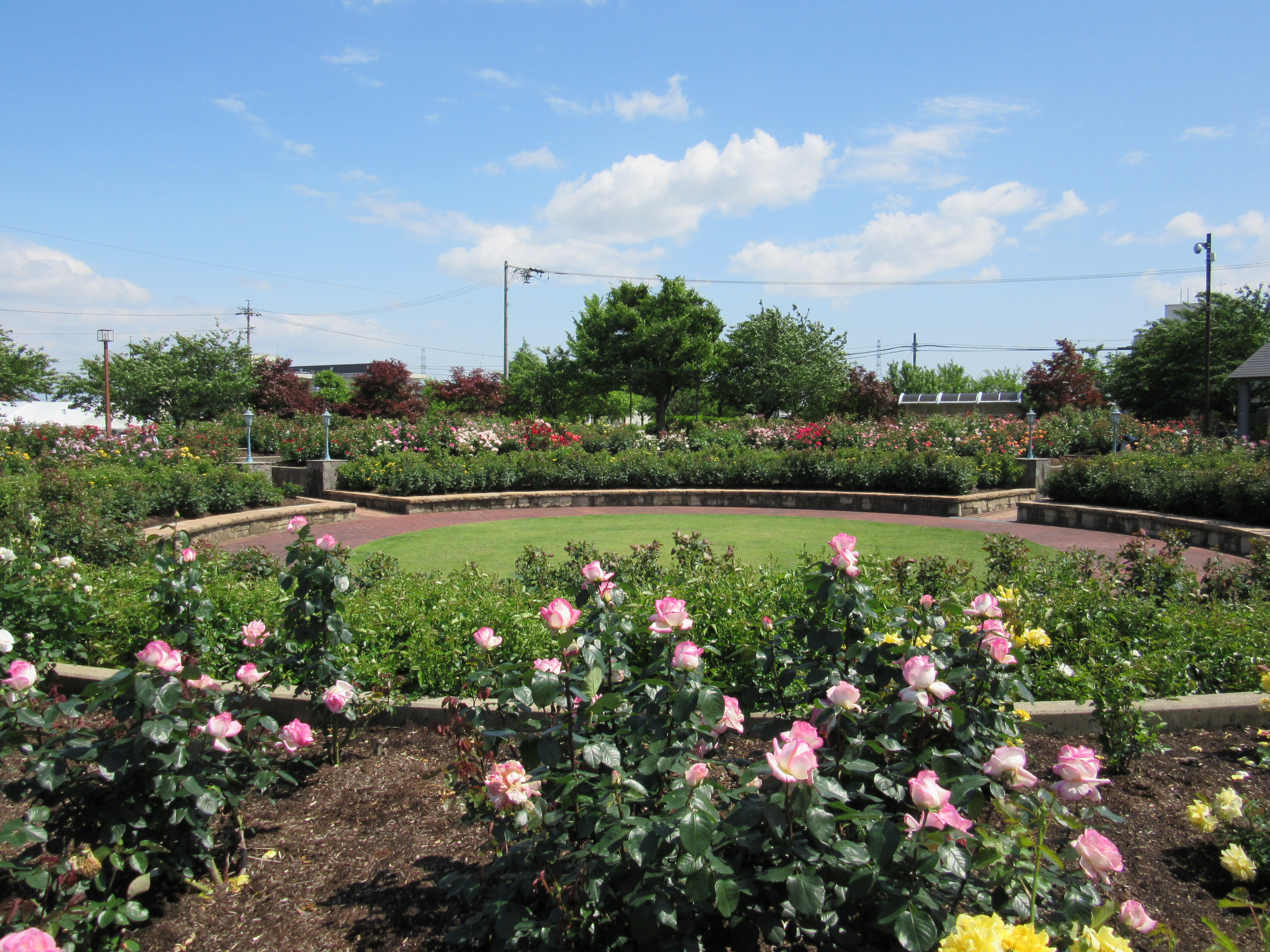
Ōno Rose Garden

Ōno (大野町, Ōno-chō) is a town located in Ibi District, Gifu Prefecture, Japan. As of 1 December 2018, the town had an estimated population of 23,111 in 7906 households and a population density of 680 persons per km^{2}. The total area of the town was 803.44 square kilometres (310.21 sq mi).

== Geography ==
Ōno is located in western Gifu Prefecture, in the northern part of the Nōbi Plain. The northern part is hilly, with an altitude of approximately 300 meters; however, most of the town is flatland between the Ibi River and the Nagara River. The town has a climate characterized by hot and humid summers, and mild winters (Köppen climate classification Cfa). The average annual temperature in Ōno is 15.1 °C. The average annual rainfall is 2024 mm with September as the wettest month. The temperatures are highest on average in August, at around 27.7 °C, and lowest in January, at around 3.7 °C. The mountainous areas of the town are noted for extremely heavy snow in winter.

=== Neighbouring municipalities ===
- Gifu Prefecture
  - Ibigawa
  - Ikeda
  - Gōdo
  - Mizuho
  - Motosu

== Demographics ==
Per Japanese census data, the population of Ōno has recently plateaued after a long period of growth.

Historical population
Year	Pop.	±%
1970	15,032	—
1980	19,127	+27.2%
1990	21,044	+10.0%
2000	23,071	+9.6%
2010	23,859	+3.4%
2020	22,041	−7.6%

== History ==
The area around Ōno was part of traditional Mino Province. During the post-Meiji restoration cadastral reforms, the area was organised into Ibi District, Gifu Prefecture. The village of Ōno was formed on July 1, 1889, with the establishment of the modern municipalities system, and was raised to town status on October 1, 1932. Ōno annexed the villages of Nishigun, Toyoki, and Tomoaki in 1954, Uguisu in 1956 and Kawai in 1960.

No Kofun Cluster

== Education ==
Ōno has six public elementary schools and two public middle schools operated by the town government. The town does not have a high school. There is one private special education school.

== Transportation ==
=== Railway ===
- The town does not have any passenger rail service.

=== Highway ===
- Tōkai-Kanjō Expressway
- National Route 303

== Sister cities ==
- Shaoyang, Hunan, China

== Local attractions ==
- Kiburi-ji, a noted Buddhist temple

== Notable people from Ōno ==
- Akiko Kikuchi, model and actress
- Hirotaka Okada, retired judoka
- Yoshinori Okada, actor
