= Kiburi-ji =

Buddhist temple in Gifu Prefecture, Japan

Kiburi-ji (来振寺)
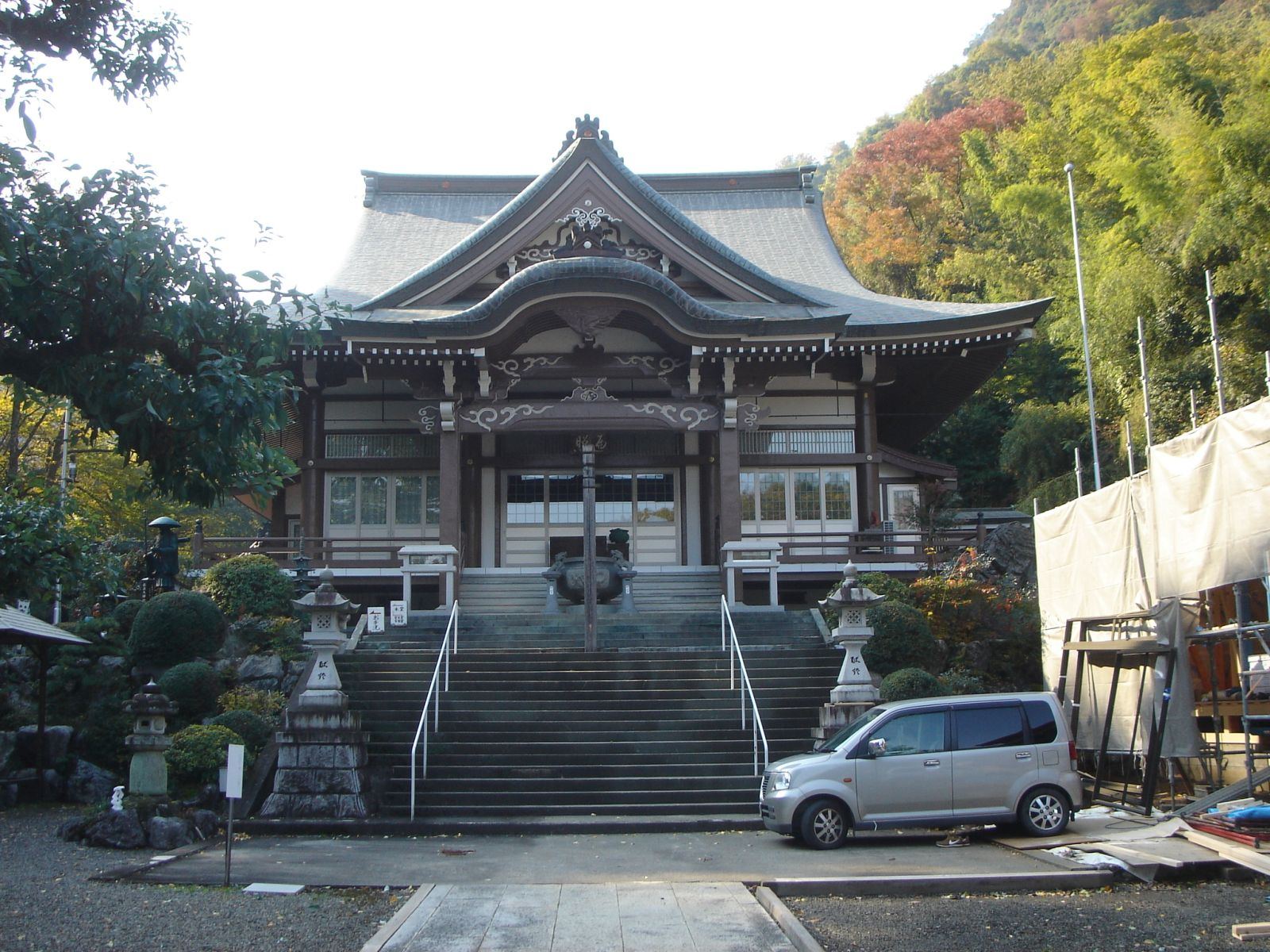

- Location within Gifu Prefecture Location within Japan

Religion
- Affiliation: Buddhism
- Deity: Juichimen Kannon
- Rite: Shingon-shū Chizan-ha

Location
- Location: Ōno, Gifu
- Country: Japan
- Interactive map of Kiburi-ji (来振寺)
- Coordinates: 35°29′56″N 136°39′05″E

Architecture
- Founder: Gyōki
- Completed: 715

Website
- kiburiji.com

Kiburi-ji (来振寺) is a Buddhist temple in Ōno, Gifu Prefecture, belonging to the Chisan sect of Shingon Buddhism. The temple claims to have been founded as the Hossō sect temple of Shinpuku-ji by the wandering priest Gyōki in 715 AD. It was burned down by Oda Nobunaga in 1560 and subsequently rebuilt with the support of Toyotomi Hideyoshi, Tokugawa Ieyasu and the Toda clan of Ōgaki Domain during the Edo period.

The temple possess a Heian period set of five scroll painting depicting the five Myō-ō (Fudō Myō-ō, Gōzanze Myō-ō, Gundari Myō-ō, Daiitoku Myō-ō, and Ususama Myō-ō which is a National Treasure of Japan.

== See also ==
- List of National Treasures of Japan (paintings)
