= Tanigumi, Gifu =

Village in Ibi District, Gifu, Japan

Map of Tanigumi, Gifu

Tanigumi (谷汲村, Tanigumi-mura) was a village located in Ibi District, Gifu Prefecture, Japan.

As of 2003, the village had an estimated population of 3,980 and a density of 54.63 persons per km^{2}. The total area was 72.85 km^{2} (28.13 sq mi).

On January 31, 2005, Tanigumi, along with the villages of Fujihashi, Kasuga, Kuze and Sakauchi (all from Ibi District), was merged into the expanded town of Ibigawa and no longer exists as an independent municipality.
