= Kuze, Gifu =

Dissolved municipality in Gifu prefecture, Japan

Map of Kuze, Gifu

Kuze (久瀬村, Kuze-mura) was a village located in Ibi District, Gifu Prefecture, Japan.

As of 2003, the village had an estimated population of 1,443 and a density of 15.30 persons per km^{2}. The total area was 94.33 km^{2}.

On January 31, 2005, Kuze, along with the villages of Fujihashi, Kasuga, Sakauchi and Tanigumi (all from Ibi District), was merged into the expanded town of Ibigawa and no longer exists as an independent municipality.
