= Hitodama =

Floating balls of fire in Japanese folklore

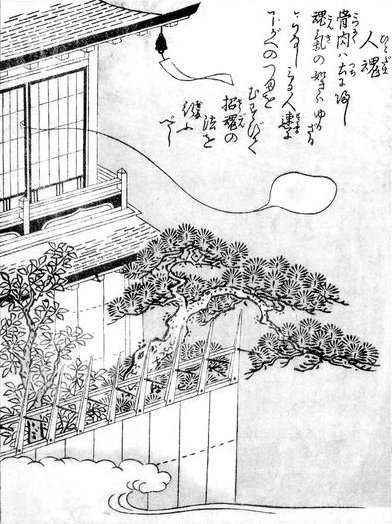
Hitodama from the Konjaku Gazu Zoku Hyakki by Toriyama Sekien

In Japanese folklore, hitodama (人魂; meaning "human soul") are balls of fire that mainly float in the air during the night. They are also referred to as onibi (demon fires) or hikarimono (glowing things). They are said to be "souls of the dead that have separated from their bodies," which is the origin of their name.

== Summary ==
Hitodama are mentioned in literature from ancient times, although alleged sightings and photographs continue into the modern day. In the Man'yōshū (Chapter 16), there is the following poem:

On this rainy night when we met alone, I think of the sorrowful [hahisa-shi] blueness of the hitodama.

— Man'yōshū (Amasaki book) Chapter 16

They are frequently confused with onibi and kitsunebi, but since hitodama are generally considered to be the "appearance of human souls that have left the body and fly through the air," they are strictly speaking a different general idea from these other atmospheric ghost lights.

Concerning their shape and nature, there are common features throughout Japan, but some differences can also be seen depending on the area. They generally fly crawling along at an elevation that is not very high. They have a color that is blue-white, orange, or red, and typically have a tail, which can be either short or long. There are also a few rare reports of them being seen during the daytime.

In Okinawa Prefecture, hitodama are called tamagai. In Nakijin, they are said to appear before a child is born, whereas in other areas they are said to be mysterious flames that drive humans to their deaths.

In Kawakami, Inba District, Chiba Prefecture (now Yachimata), hitodama are called tamase. They are said to leave the body 2 or 3 days after a human dies and go toward temples or the homes of people with whom the deceased had a deep relationship. They are said to make a loud sound in storm shutters and gardens, but this sound can allegedly only be heard by those who had a close connection to the spirit. Additionally, folklore states that for those who have not seen a tamase by the time they are 28 years of age, a tamase will come towards them saying "let's meet, let's meet" (aimashō, aimashō); therefore, even those who have not seen one by age 28 will pretend to have seen one.

== Theories ==
Various scientific and natural explanations have been proposed for the phenomenon.

The 19th-century British folklorist Sabine Baring-Gould considered it plausible that the decomposition of corpses could generate phosphine (hydrogen phosphide), creating a blue light that floats over graves. A common theory in Japan states that "since funerals before the war were burials, it was common for phosphorus from the body to react with rainwater on rainy nights to produce light, and the meager scientific knowledge of the masses resulted in the idea of hitodama." However, phosphoric acid, which is abundant in human and animal bones, does not spontaneously combust. In contrast, phosphine is a colorless, flammable gas (with a decaying fish odor) that can ignite spontaneously when reacting with oxygen in the air at room temperature.

Other explanations include the misidentification of bioluminescent organisms (such as fireflies), meteors, animals with luminous moss attached to them, combustible gases from swamps, ball lightning, or optical illusions.

- Fireflies: Three species are common in Japan: Nipponoluciola cruciata (Genji hotaru), Aquatica lateralis (Heike hotaru), and Colophotia praeusta. Every year at the Fusa-park in Tokyo the legendary feast Hotarugari (firefly catching) is celebrated.
- Optical Illusions: The physicist Torahiko Terada noted in a 1933 essay for the Imperial University Newspaper that different phenomena likely contribute to the legend. He discussed instances where his children witnessed "fireballs," experiments involving optical afterimages from high-voltage sparks, and reports of "earthquake lights" during the 1930 North Izu earthquake, concluding that physical phenomena combined with optical illusions likely explain many sightings.

There have also been "artificial hitodama" created using combustible gases, such as a 1976 experiment using methane gas by Meiji University professor Masao Yamana.

In the 1980s, Yoshihiko Ootsuki posited the theory that they are "plasma generated in the air."

However, there remain some hitodama reports that cannot be fully explained by the above theories, and it is thought that the phenomenon arises from a variety of different causes.

== See also ==
- Atmospheric ghost lights
- Ball lightning
- Kitsunebi
- Onibi
- Shiranui
- Soul
- Will-o'-the-wisp
- Yūrei

== Sources ==
- Karen Ann Smyers: The fox and the jewel: shared and private meanings in contemporary Japanese inari worship. University of Hawaii Press, Honolulu 1999, ISBN 0-8248-2102-5, page 117 & 118.
- Stephen Addiss, Helen Foresman: Japanese ghosts & demons: art of the supernatural. G. Braziller, Illinois 1985, ISBN 978-0-486-99052-1
- Lloyd Vernon Knutson, Jean-Claude Vala: Biology of Snail-Killing Sciomyzidae Flies. Cambridge University Press, Cambridge (UK) 2011, ISBN 0-521-86785-1, page 24.
- Chris Philo, Chris Wilbert: Animal spaces, beastly places: new geographies of human-animal relations (= Band 10 von Critical geographies). Routledge, London/New York 2000, ISBN 0-415-19847-X, page 172–173.
