= Fujihashi, Gifu =

Dissolved municipality in Gifu prefecture, Japan

Location of Fujihashi in Gifu Prefecture

Fujihashi (藤橋村, Fujihashi-mura) was a village located in Ibi District, Gifu Prefecture, Japan.

As of 2003, the village had an estimated population of 488 and a density of 1.50 persons per km^{2}. The total area was 324.48 km^{2}.

On January 31, 2005, Fujihashi, along with the villages of Kasuga, Kuze, Sakauchi and Tanigumi (all from Ibi District), was merged into the expanded town of Ibigawa and no longer exists as an independent municipality.
