= Kasuga, Gifu =

Dissolved municipality in Gifu prefecture, Japan

Map of Kasuga, Gifu

Kasuga (春日村, Kasuga-mura) was a village located in Ibi District, Gifu Prefecture, Japan.

As of 2003, the village had an estimated population of 1,570 and a density of 13.96 persons per km^{2}. The total area was 112.44 km^{2}.

On January 31, 2005, Kasuga, along with the villages of Fujihashi, Kuze, Sakauchi and Tanigumi (all from Ibi District), was merged into the expanded town of Ibigawa and no longer exists as an independent municipality.
