= Sakauchi, Gifu =

Dissolved municipality in Gifu prefecture, Japan

Map of Sakauchi, Gifu

Sakauchi (坂内村, Sakauchi-mura) was a village located in Ibi District, Gifu Prefecture, Japan.

== Population ==
As of 2003, the village had an estimated population of 611 and a density of 3.99 persons per km^{2}. The total area was 153.26 km^{2}.

== History ==
On January 31, 2005, Sakauchi, along with the villages of Fujihashi, Kasuga, Kuze and Tanigumi (all from Ibi District), was merged into the expanded town of Ibigawa and no longer exists as an independent municipality.
