= Ibigawa =

Ibigawa 揖斐川町
- Town
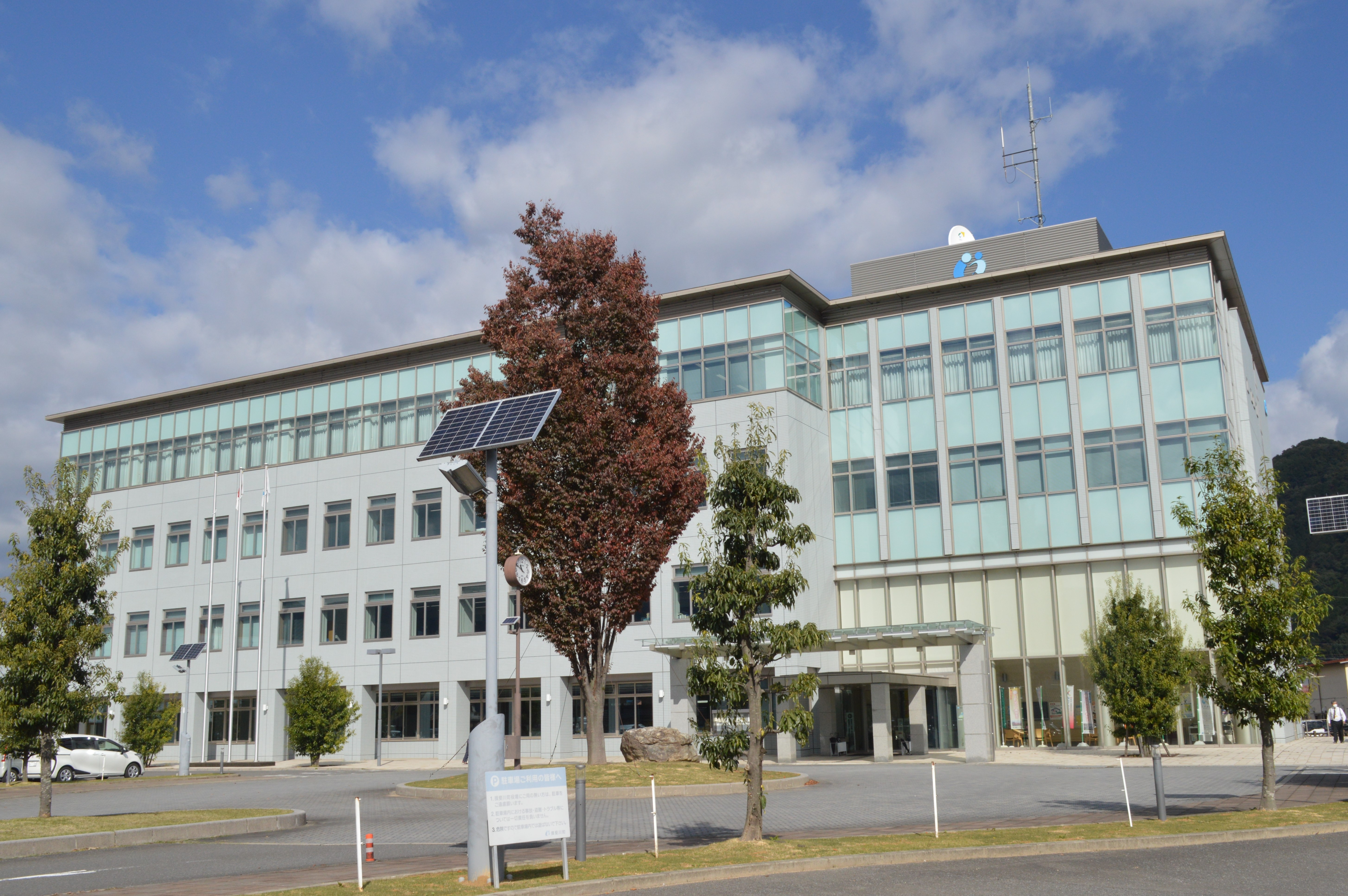
- Ibigawa Town Hall

- Flag Seal

- Location of Ibigawa in Gifu Prefecture

- Coordinates: 35°29′14.2″N 136°34′6.9″E
- Country: Japan
- Region: Chūbu
- Prefecture: Gifu
- District: Ibi

Government
  - Mayor: Takao Sōmiya

Area
  - Total: 803.44 km^{2} (310.21 sq mi)

Population (December 1, 2018)
  - Total: 21,319
  - Density: 26.535/km^{2} (68.724/sq mi)
- Time zone: UTC+9 (Japan Standard Time)
- Phone number: 0585-22-2111
- Address: Miwa 133, Ibigawa-chō, Ibi-gun, Gifu-ken 501-0692
- Climate: Cfa
- Website: Official website
- Symbols
- Flower: Prunus persica
- Tree: Japanese Zelkova

Ibigawa (揖斐川町, Ibigawa-chō) is a town located in Ibi District, Gifu Prefecture, Japan. As of 1 December 2018, the town had an estimated population of 21,319 in 8,015 households and a population density of 27 persons per km^{2}. The total area of the town was 803.44 square kilometres (310.21 sq mi).

== Geography ==
Ibigawa is located in far western Gifu Prefecture, bordering on Shiga Prefecture to the west and Fukui Prefecture to the north. The Ibi River flows through the town, which is located in a hilly to mountainous area. Parts of the town are within the borders of the Ibi-Sekigahara-Yōrō Quasi-National Park.

=== Climate ===
The town has a climate characterized by hot and humid summers, and mild winters (Köppen climate classification Cfa). The average annual temperature in Ibigawa is 15.5 °C (59.9 °F). The average annual rainfall is 2,517.6 mm (99.12 in) with July as the wettest month. The temperatures are highest on average in August, at around 27.6 °C (81.7 °F), and lowest in January, at around 3.8 °C (38.8 °F). The mountainous areas of the town are noted for extremely heavy snow in winter.

Climate data for Ibigawa (1991−2020 normals, extremes 1978−present)
Month	Jan	Feb	Mar	Apr	May	Jun	Jul	Aug	Sep	Oct	Nov	Dec	Year
Record high °C (°F)	17.7 (63.9)	20.3 (68.5)	26.0 (78.8)	31.2 (88.2)	34.5 (94.1)	36.4 (97.5)	39.6 (103.3)	39.6 (103.3)	38.2 (100.8)	32.6 (90.7)	25.6 (78.1)	21.9 (71.4)	39.6 (103.3)
Mean daily maximum °C (°F)	8.2 (46.8)	9.4 (48.9)	13.4 (56.1)	19.4 (66.9)	24.5 (76.1)	27.7 (81.9)	31.4 (88.5)	33.0 (91.4)	28.8 (83.8)	23.3 (73.9)	17.1 (62.8)	10.9 (51.6)	20.6 (69.1)
Daily mean °C (°F)	3.8 (38.8)	4.6 (40.3)	8.2 (46.8)	13.8 (56.8)	18.9 (66.0)	22.7 (72.9)	26.4 (79.5)	27.6 (81.7)	23.8 (74.8)	18.0 (64.4)	11.8 (53.2)	6.2 (43.2)	15.5 (59.9)
Mean daily minimum °C (°F)	0.0 (32.0)	0.3 (32.5)	3.3 (37.9)	8.5 (47.3)	13.8 (56.8)	18.5 (65.3)	22.7 (72.9)	23.7 (74.7)	19.9 (67.8)	13.7 (56.7)	7.3 (45.1)	2.3 (36.1)	11.2 (52.1)
Record low °C (°F)	−7.0 (19.4)	−8.2 (17.2)	−6.2 (20.8)	−0.4 (31.3)	4.4 (39.9)	11.4 (52.5)	16.1 (61.0)	16.4 (61.5)	10.7 (51.3)	2.7 (36.9)	−1.3 (29.7)	−5.9 (21.4)	−8.2 (17.2)
Average precipitation mm (inches)	108.8 (4.28)	105.8 (4.17)	171.7 (6.76)	224.1 (8.82)	279.0 (10.98)	302.5 (11.91)	379.4 (14.94)	213.9 (8.42)	312.5 (12.30)	184.3 (7.26)	112.1 (4.41)	120.8 (4.76)	2,517.6 (99.12)
Average precipitation days (≥ 1.0 mm)	12.5	10.9	11.7	10.4	10.4	12.8	14.1	11.8	12.3	9.3	9.5	13.2	138.9
Mean monthly sunshine hours	136.9	147.3	183.7	196.7	197.5	149.7	156.9	192.4	155.5	160.3	143.4	131.7	1,951.7
Source: Japan Meteorological Agency

=== Neighbouring municipalities ===
- Fukui Prefecture
  - Ikeda
  - Minamiechizen
  - Ōno
- Gifu Prefecture
  - Ikeda
  - Motosu
  - Ōno
  - Sekigahara
  - Tarui
- Shiga Prefecture
  - Maibara
  - Nagahama

== Demographics ==
Per Japanese census data, the population of Ibigawa has declined over the past 40 years.

Historical population
Year	Pop.	±%
1970	29,979	—
1980	31,171	+4.0%
1990	29,156	−6.5%
2000	27,453	−5.8%
2010	23,784	−13.4%
2020	19,529	−17.9%

== History ==
The area around Ibigawa was part of traditional Mino Province. During the Edo period, it initially part of a 30,000 koku domain controlled by the Nishio clan, but from 1623 was divided between territory controlled by Owari Domain and tenryō holdings directly controlled by the Tokugawa shogunate. During the post-Meiji restoration cadastral reforms, the area was organised into Ibi District, Gifu Prefecture. The town of Ibigawa was formed on July 1, 1889, with the establishment of the modern municipalities system.

On January 31, 2005, the former villages of Fujihashi, Kasuga, Kuze, Sakauchi, and Tanigumi merged with Ibigawa, resulting in a nearly 20-fold increase in area.

== Education ==
Ibigawa has six public elementary schools and five public middle schools operated by the town government. The town has one public high school operated by the Gifu Prefectural Board of Education.

== Transportation ==
=== Railway ===
- Tarumi Railway Tarumi Line
  - Tanigumi-guchi -- < Kōmi > -- Takashina
- Yōrō Railway Yōrō Line
  - Ibi

=== Highway ===
- National Route 303
- National Route 417
