= Shiranui (optical phenomenon) =

Atmospheric ghost light

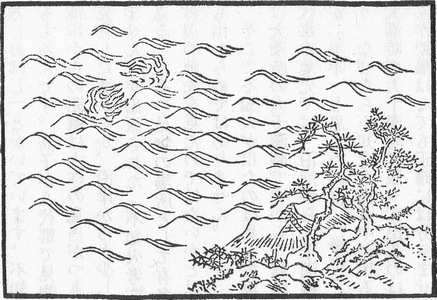
"Shiranui" from the Shokoku Rijindan by Kikuoka Tenryō

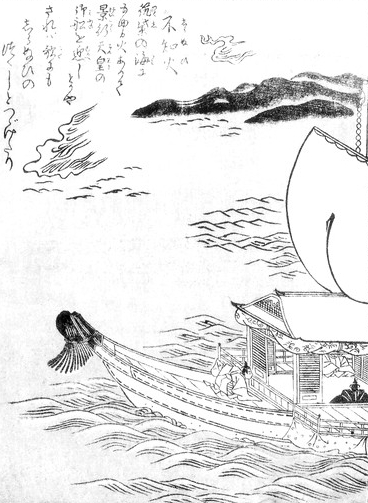
"Shiranui" from the Konjaku Gazu Zoku Hyakki by Toriyama Sekien

Shiranui (不知火, unknown fire; Shiranuhi in the historical kana orthography) is an atmospheric ghost light told about in Kyushu. They are said to appear on days of the noon moon such as the kaijitsu (29th or 30th day) of the seventh month of the lunisolar Japanese calendar when the wind is weak, in the Yatsushiro Sea and the Ariake Sea. The phenomenon persists in the present day, with the strange lights having been determined to be an atmospheric optical phenomenon.

== Summary ==
The phenomenon occurs several kilometers out from the shore in open water. First, one or two flames called oyabi (親火, lit. "parent-fire") will appear. These will split off to the left and right and multiply, eventually producing anywhere from several hundred to several thousand flames in a row. They are said to span four to eight kilometers. It is believed that the greatest number of shiranui can be seen at the lowest tide, within two hours of 3:00AM.

They are said to be invisible from the water's surface and visible up to ten meters above the surface. If one attempts to approach them, they will appear to get farther away. They were formerly believed to be the lamps of the Dragon God, and nearby fishing villages would prohibit fishing on days when shiranui were seen.

According to the Nihon Shoki, the Hizen no Kuni Fudoki, and the Higo no Kuni Fudoki, when Emperor Keiko conquered Kumamoto in southern Kyushu, they advanced using the shiranui as a landmark. In his journey to expand the Yamato Ōken, he saw inexplicable spots of moving fire, shiranui, in the Ariake Sea and the Yatsushiro Sea (also called the Shiranui Sea). When he told local gozoku about these sightings, the gozoku replied that they did not know of this fire. It was thus named “shiranu hi” ("unknown fire," which eventually elided into "shiranui"), and the area was named Hi Province (火国 or 肥国, Hi no kuni; "Land of Fire," or "Kingdom of Fire"), now known as Kumamoto Prefecture.

== History ==
In 1835, Nakashima Hiroashi wrote a book entitled On the Shiranui:

Many people gather to witness Shiranui even from remote areas. I myself watched Shiranui many times. The Shiranui appears 8 to 12 kilometers distant from the seashore, but it was not sure since it was very dark. At first, one or two spots of fire appear late at night. This is named oya-dama or father fire. Then, the distance between the fires becomes longer, and subsequently, spots of fires appear and disappear as time goes by, and late at night it may become continuous. The lights appear like stars. At dawn, they disappear. When rain and strong wind come, Shiranui does not appear. Many people watch Shiranui from mountains, and they enjoy drinking sake there.

From time immemorial, the Gulf of Shimabara (near the Ariake Sea) has been famed for Shiranui, the unknown fire, which appears from time to time. The phenomenon occurs twice a year, about 30 September and 24 February, from some time after midnight until the approach of dawn. Sometime the light is a large ball of fire rising from the surface of the sea to a height of 60 feet; sometimes it is a line of pale red, fiery globes drifting and down the tide.

== Hypotheses ==
1. Reflection of star lights
2. Luminous jellyfish
3. Fire from undersea active volcano
4. Light of fishing boats

In the Taishō era, Shiranui attracted the attention of many people, including scholars and journalists who attempted to scientifically explain the phenomenon, one notion being the fires as a type of mirage. There was a large scale investigation with two ships and more than 50 people in the Ariake Sea in 1916; however, their conflicting data gave no scientific clarification. According to one theory from the Shōwa era by Machika Miyanishi, professor of Kumamoto Higher Technical School and Hiroshima Higher Technical School, who made extensive scientific studies and wrote eight papers, including two in English, the time when shiranui appear is the time when sea temperature is the greatest in the year, and the tide would sink about 6 meters, resulting in a mudflat and sudden radiative cooling, and overlapping with the land formation at the Yatsushiro Sea and the Ariake Sea, the lights of the boats that would depart to get the fish of the tidelands would get refracted. This theory is seen as having merit even in the modern era, and Miyanishi Machika, of the high industries of Kumoto and a professor from the Hiroshima Higher Technical School, researched this as his specialty. According to him, the shiranui are fires for luring fish at night (isaribi), their flickering and their alliance and rupture, helped with optical illusions, results in it being seen as mysterious flames.

The meteorologist Sakuhei Fujiwhara wrote Atmospheric Light Phenomena in 1933, but in it, he wrote that he did not know the cause of shiranui, and due to some who profited from delighting sightseers, he pointed out the possibility that they are from noctiluca.

Tairi Yamashita, professor at Kumamoto University, made extensive studies of Shiranui using modern instruments with the assistance of students. He concluded, "Shiranui is an optical phenomenon resulting from light going through the complicated distributions of clumps of air with different temperatures and getting refracted. Therefore, the source of these lights are fires from private houses and fires used for luring fish, and so on. When these conditions are met, the same kind of phenomenon can be seen in other places and days. For example, road mirages, mirages in general, and heat shimmer are the same type of phenomena. Also, Nobuyuki Marume, in the collection of essays, "Shiranui," published many photographs under the title "Changes of Shiranui with the Passage of Time from Shiranui Town towards the Direction of Amura."

Machika Miyanishi, professor of Kumamoto Higher Technical School and Hiroshima Higher Technical School, made extensive scientific studies and wrote eight papers, including two English papers. His conclusion was: the light source of Shiranui was that of fishing boats. Large tideland forms lumps of air of different temperatures on special days, and by the voltex movement of air lumps, the light appears as deformed fluctuation in images of light. Tairi Yamashita, Professor at Kumamoto University, made extensive studies of Shiranui using modern instruments with the assistance of students. He concluded that there is a very complex distribution of heated air lumps and cold air lumps which constantly change. Light from distant sources repeatedly fluctuates, and either increases or decreases or disappears. In some cases, light is split. These changes appear to the observer changing greatly and irregularly. Under the same conditions, Shiranui may appear in other seasons.

Nowadays, the tidal flats have been built on, lightbulbs illuminate the darkness of the night, and the seawater has become polluted making it difficult to see these shiranui.

== See also ==
- Hitodama
- Kitsunebi
- Will-o'-the-wisp

== Sources ==
- A study of Shiranui. Miyanishi Machika. Dainippon Shuppan Kabushiki Kaisha. 1943.
- A collection of references on Shiranui. Shiranui reference collecting committee. 1993. Shiranui Town.
- Investigation on Shiranui I. Tairi Yamashita. Kumamoto University Department of Education Kiyo. Vo. 21 1972.
- Investigation on Shiranui II Tairi Yamashita. Kumamoto University Department of Education Kiyo. Vol. 33, 1984.
- Changes of Shiranui with the Passage of Time from Shiranui Town towards the Direction of Amura. Nobuyuki Marume. Photographs, 9th collection.
- A study of Shiranui. Tairi Yamashita. 1994. Ashi Shobou. ISBN 4-7512-0576-5
- A new study of Shiranui. Iwao Tateishi.1994. Tsukiji Shokan. ISBN 4-8067-1047-4
