= Kitsunebi =

Atmospheric ghost lights in Japanese folklore

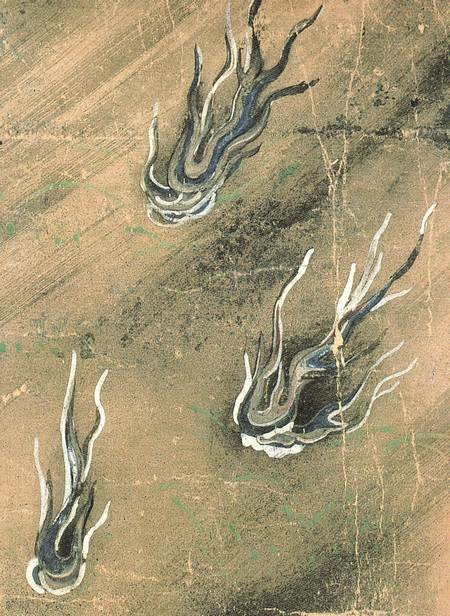
The Bakemono Tsukushi Emaki, author unknown (late Edo period)

Kitsunebi (狐火) is an atmospheric ghost light told about in legends all across Japan outside Okinawa Prefecture. They are also called "hitobosu", "hitomoshi" (火点し), and "rinka" (燐火).

== Overview ==
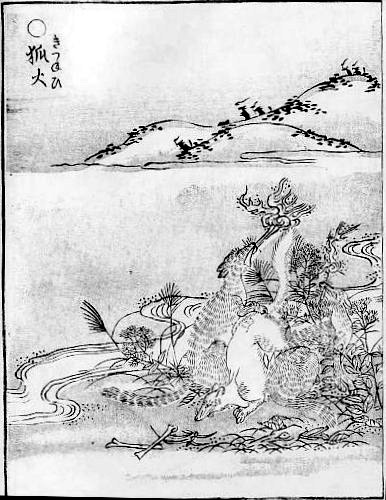
"Kitsunebi"
―Gazu Hyakki Yagyō by Toriyama Sekien

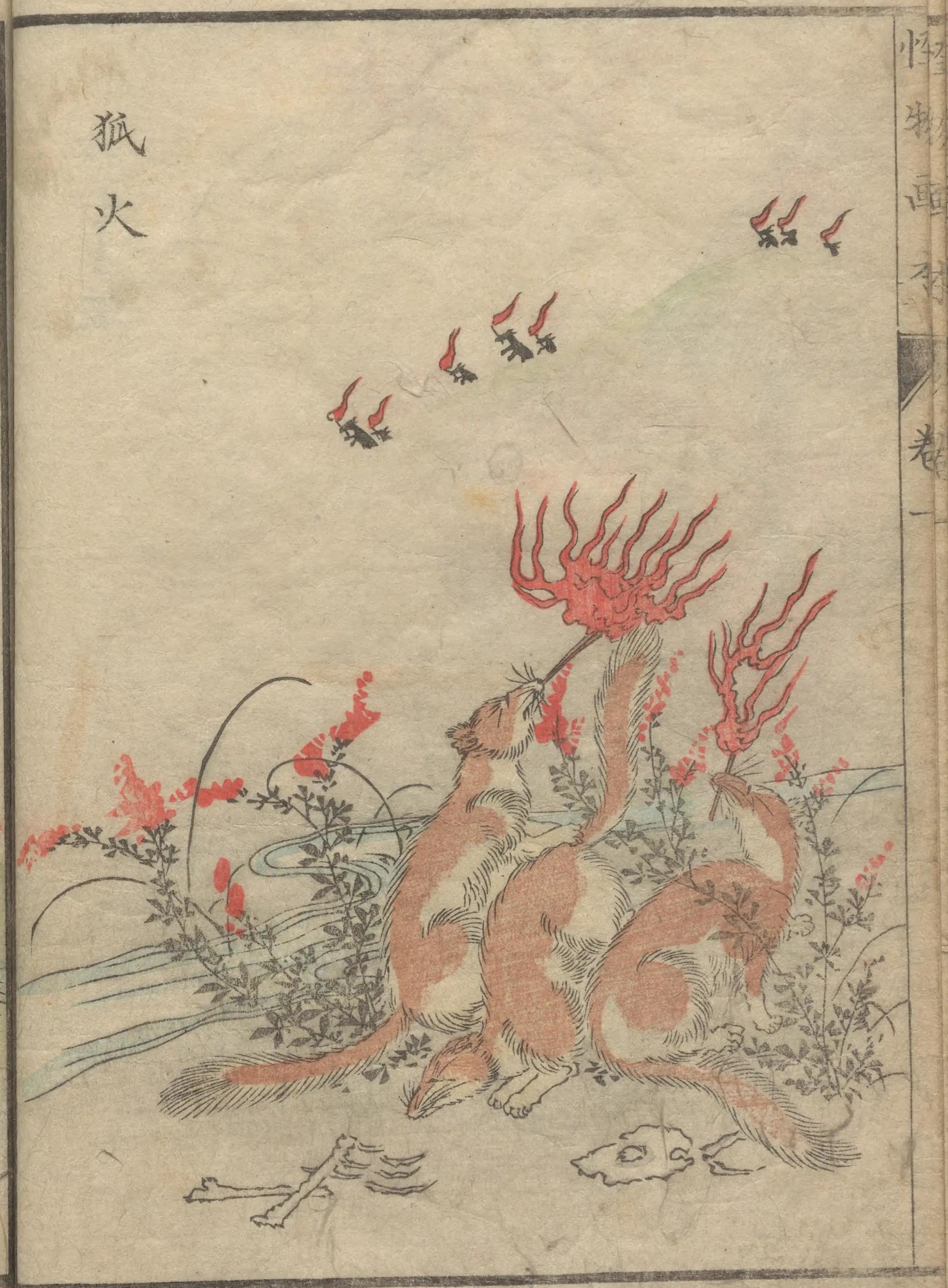
"Kitsunebi"
―Kaibutsu gahon (1881), original drawing by Rikan Mitsukata, copied by Nabeta Gyokuei

Kimimori Sarashina, a researcher of local stories, summarizes the features of the kitsunebi as follows: in places where there was no presence of fire, mysterious flames like those of a paper lantern or a torch would appear in a line and flicker in and out, with fires that had gone out sometimes appearing in yet another place, so that if one attempted to chase after what was behind all this, it would disappear in the middle. When they appear between spring and autumn, they show up especially in hot summers and appear easily when it is cloudy when the weather is changing.

They are said to appear from ten to several hundred in a line, and just when one thinks that they have increased, they would suddenly disappear, then multiply once again. In the Nagano Prefecture, many lights like that of a paper lantern would appear in a line and flicker.

The line's length spans across up to one ri (about 500–600 m). Generally the color of the fire is red or orange, but there have been several examples of witnesses that have seen blue flames.

Concerning their location of appearance, in Tonami, Toyama Prefecture, they said to appear in the hillsides where there are no roads and other places where there is no presence of humans; but in Monzen, Fugeshi District, Ishikawa Prefecture (now Wajima), there are also legends where kitsunebi is said to follow a human anywhere. It is often said that foxes trick humans, so likewise, the kitsunebi would light up places where there are no roads and make the humans lose their way. In Iida, Nagano Prefecture, it was said to be possible to disperse it when such a thing happens by kicking it up with one's feet. In Izumo Province (now Shimane Prefecture), there are legends about catching a fever after encountering a kitsunebi, giving a strong basis for the hypothesis that kitsunebi are like ikiaigami (divine spirits that bring misfortune from unprepared encounters with them).

Also, there was a story in Nagano in which a certain lord and vassal were looking for a place to build a castle. A white fox lit up the path at night and guided the way for them to reach a suitable place for a castle.

Just as Masaoka Shiki composed haiku about winter and kitsunebi, they usually appear during the winter; but there have also been examples where they appear in the hot season of summer or in autumn.

There is a theory that kitsunebi is another name for onibi, but usually they are considered separate from onibi.

== Legends by area ==
=== In Ōji Inari ===
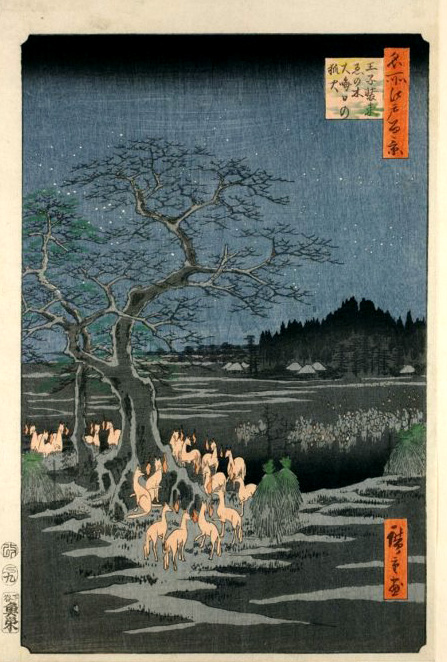
"Kitsunebi on New Year's Night under the Enoki Tree near Ōji" in the One Hundred Famous Views of Edo by Hiroshige. Each fox has a kitsunebi floating close to their face.

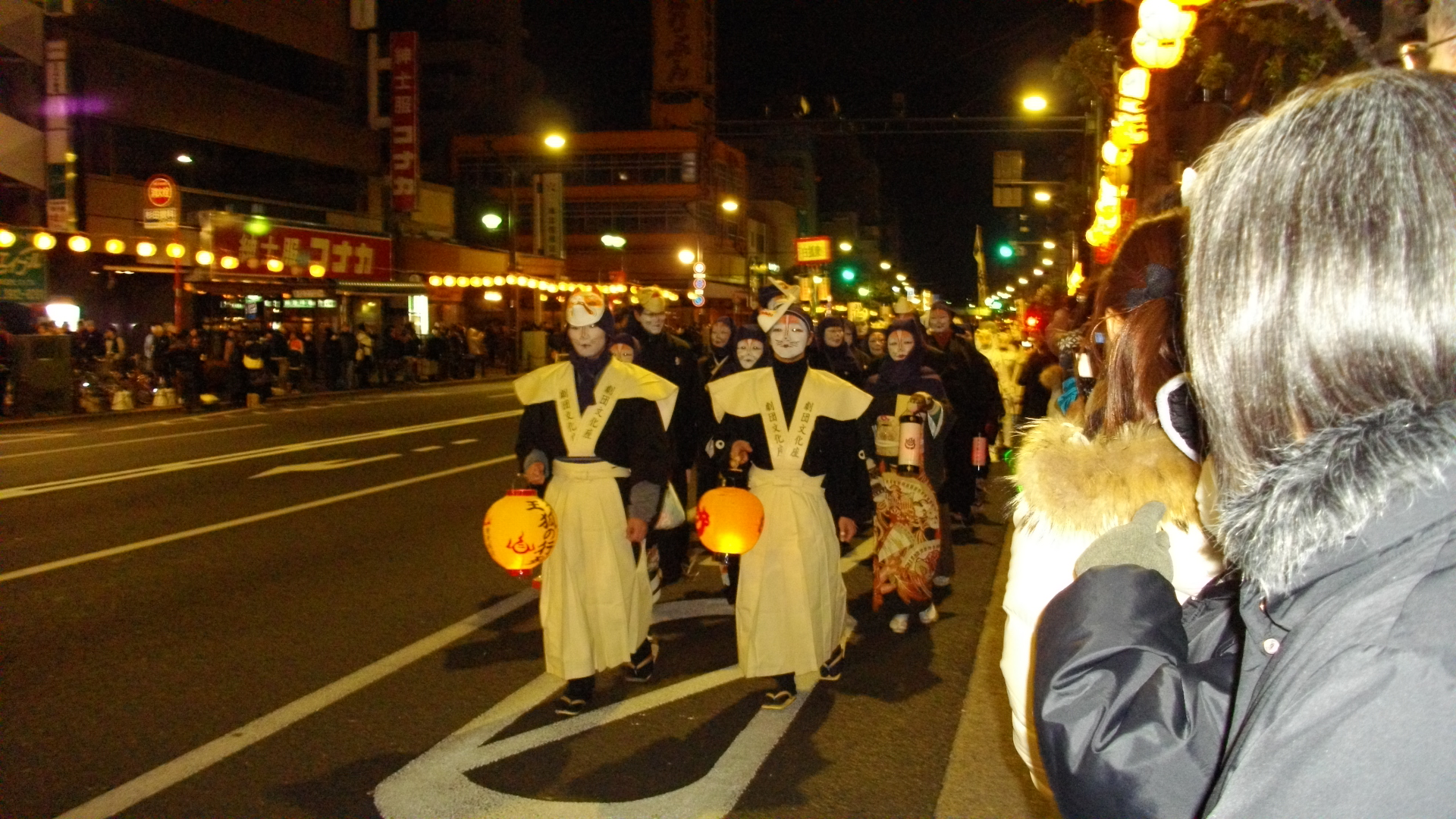
Kitsune no Gyoretsu(Ōji 2010)

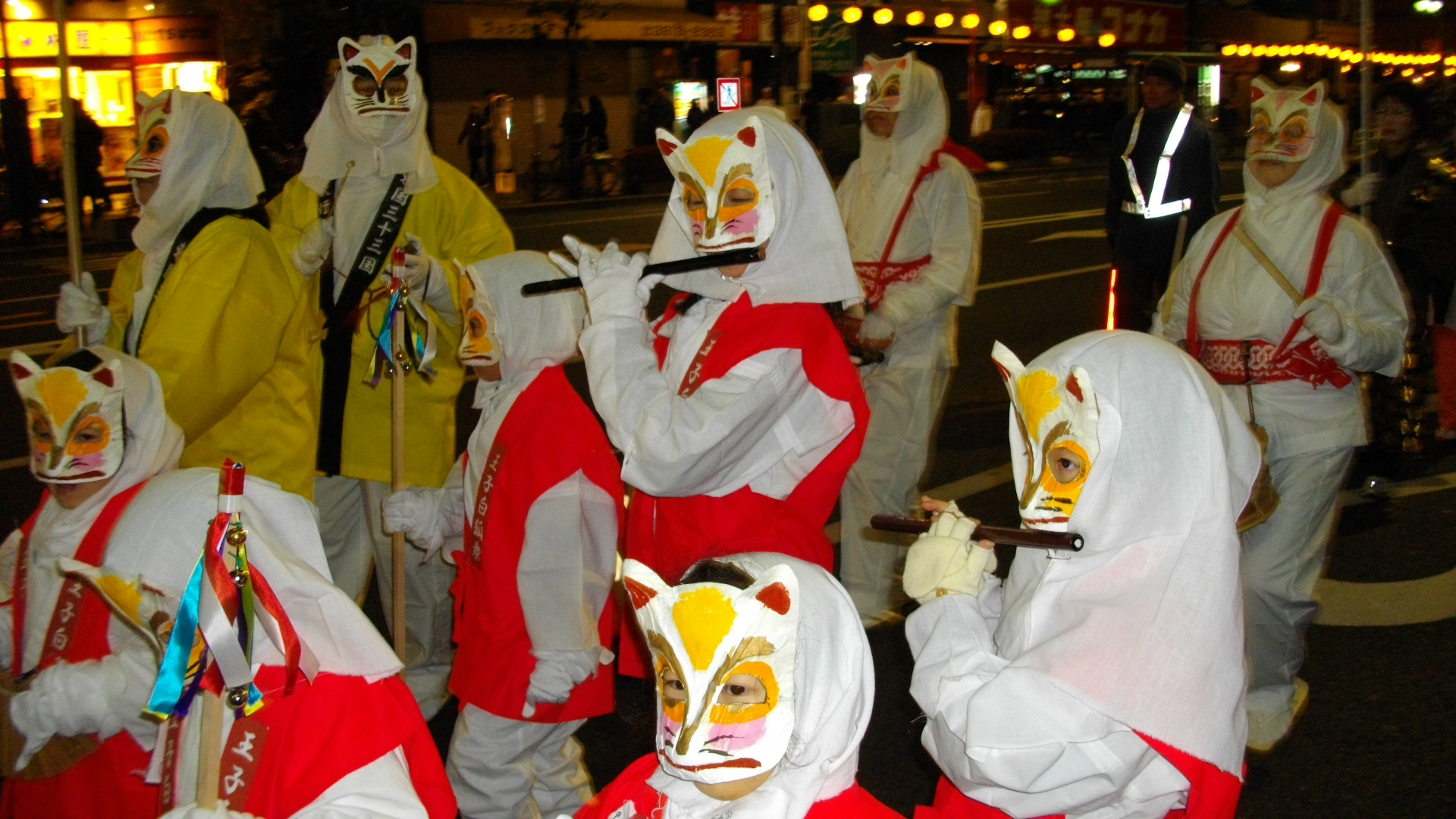
Kitsune no Gyoretsu(Ōji 2010)

Ōji Inari of Ōji, Kita, Tokyo, is known to be the head of Inari Ōkami, it is also a famous place for kitsunebi.

Formerly, the area around Ōji was all a rural zone, and on the roadside there was a big enoki tree. Every year, on the night of Ōmisoka, the foxes of Kanhasshū (all of the Kantō region) would gather below the tree, put on uniforms, call on their ranks, and visit the palace of Ōji Inari. As the kitsunebi that can be seen on this occasion was quite a spectacle, it is said that the peasants around the area would count their numbers and used that to predict a good or bad harvest for next year.

From this, enoki trees are also called "shōzoku enoki" (装束榎, "costume enoki"), and it became a well known place, and even became a subject in Hiroshige's work One Hundred Famous Views of Edo. The tree withered away in the Meiji period, but a small shrine called the "Shōzoku Inari Jinja" remains next to the former second Ōji tram stop (now in front of the "horibun" intersection point), and the area was previously called Enokimachi (榎町, "enoki town"). As this area was part of a larger development plan, in 1993, on the evening of the annual Ōmisoka, an event was held called the "Ōji Kitsune's Procession".

=== Other places ===
In the Dewa Province in Yamagata Prefecture and in Akita Prefecture, kitsunebi are called "kitsune taimatsu" (狐松明, "fox torch"). As its name implies, it is said to be a torchlight to provide lighting for a fox's marriage, and is said to be a good omen.

In Bizen, Okayama Prefecture, and the Tottori Prefecture, these atmospheric ghost lights are called "chūko" (宙狐). Different from the average kitsunebi, they float at relatively low altitudes, and thus in Toyohara village, Oku District of Okayama, it is said that an old fox shapeshifted into a chūko. Similarly, on Ryūgūjima, Tamatsu village, Oku District, the atmospheric ghost lights that appear at night with signs of coming rain that are about as big as paper lanterns are called chūko. Sometimes they would fall to the earth and illuminate the surroundings, and then finally disappear without a trace. Enryō Inoue, a yōkai researcher from the Meiji period, applied the characters 中狐 to it, indicating the ones that fly high as "tenko" (天狐), and the ones that fly low as chūko.

== True identity ==
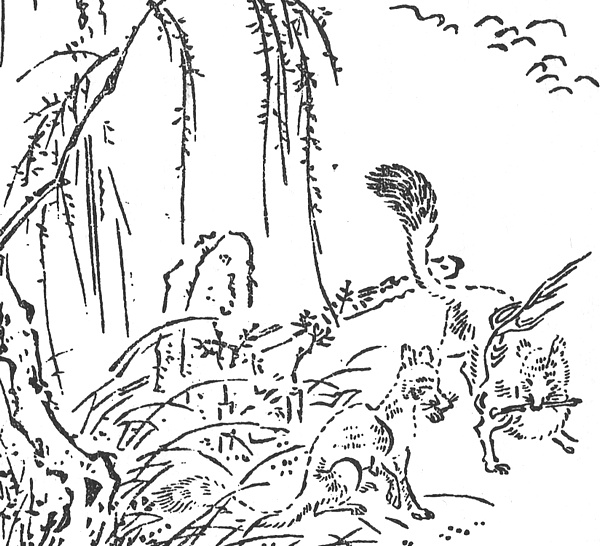
Depiction of kitsunebi from the Kunmō Tenchiben. It depicts a fox holding a bone in its mouth and causing a fire.

In various folk legends and writings of the Edo Period, there are many things said about foxes concerning how their breath would glow, how they would strike with their tails to light a fire, and how they would have a glowing ball called the "kitsunebi-tama" (kitsunebi ball), among other tales. The Kanpō period essay the Shokoku Rijidan states that in the beginning years of Genroku, when fishermen capture kitsunebi with their nets, there would be a kitsunebi-tama caught in their nets, and it was an object that was useful as illumination because it does not shine during the daytime but would glow at night time.

In the Genroku period book about herbalism, the Honchō Shokkan, there is a statement about how foxes would use withered trees on the ground to make fires. "Fox fire" in English is translated to "kitsunebi" in Japanese, and this "fox" does not refer to the animal, but instead means "withered" or "rotten and discolored", and seeing how "fox fire" refers to the fire of withered trees and the light of hypha and mushroom roots that cling to withered trees, statements such as the one from the Honchō Shokkan could be seen to refer to the light from the hypha on withered trees on the ground.

Also in the Honchō Shokkan, there are statements about how foxes would make light using human skulls and horse bones, and the Meiwa period Kunmō Tenchiben by the yomihon author Takai Ranzan and the late Edo Period Shōzan Chomon Kishū by the essayist Miyoshi Shōzan also state that foxes would hold horse bones in their mouth to light a fire. In the collection of strange tales from the Nagano Prefecture, the Shinshū Hyaku Monogatari, when a person goes near a kitsunebi, there would be a fox holding human bones in their mouth, and after the fox goes away, the human bone would be glowing a turquoise color. From things such as this, Enryō Inoue among others support the theory that phosphorous light given off from within bones is linked to kitsunebi. Phosphorus spontaneously combusts above 30°C, which would also be a reason for why the fox's true identity would be linked to the light from phosphorus. However, the kitsunebi in legends is said to be visible even from a distance of several kilometers away, which would be hard to square with the idea that they are actually sources of light as weak as hypha or phosphorus.

In 1977, the folkloricist Yoshiharu Tsunda's detailed research gave the explanation that almost all kitsunebi can be explained by a large refraction of light that often occurs in alluvial fans that go between mountainous and plain regions. There are also other hypotheses on their true identities such as the natural combustion of petroleum or ball lightning, but there are many that still go unexplained.

== See also ==
- Kitsune no yomeiri
- List of legendary creatures from Japan
- Shiranui
- Will-o'-the-wisp
