= Atmospheric ghost lights =

Lights that appear in the atmosphere without an obvious cause

Atmospheric ghost lights are lights (or fires) that appear in the atmosphere without an obvious cause. Examples include the onibi, hitodama and will-o'-wisp. They are often seen in humid climates.

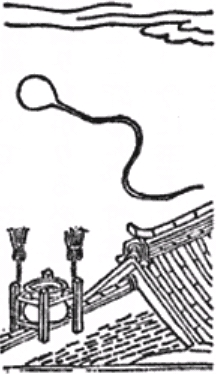

According to legend, some lights are wandering spirits of the dead, the work of devils or yōkai, or the pranks of fairies. They are feared by some people as a portent of death. In other parts of the world, there are folk beliefs that supernatural fires appear where treasure is buried; these fires are said to be the spirits of the treasure or the spirits of humans buried with grave goods. Atmospheric ghost lights are also sometimes thought to be related to UFOs.

Some ghost lights such as St. Elmo's fire or the shiranui have been explained as optical phenomena of light emitted through electrical activity. Other types may be due to combustion of flammable gases, ball lightning, meteors, torches and other human-made fires, the misperception of human objects, and pranks.

== Australia ==
The Min Min light is a phenomenon believed to occur in outback Australia. The lights originate from before European colonization but have now become part of modern urban folklore.

== Canada ==
The St. Louis light is a mysterious beam of white light reported near St. Louis, Saskatchewan.

== Japan ==
In addition to the onibi and hitodama, there are other examples of atmospheric ghost lights in legend, such as the kitsunebi and the shiranui:

Osabi (筬火; lit. "guide for yarn on loom fire")
In the Nobeoka, Miyazaki Prefecture area, atmospheric ghost lights were described in first-hand accounts until the middle of the Meiji period. Two balls of fire would appear side by side on rainy nights at a pond known as the Misuma pond (Misumaike). It was said that a woman lent an osa (a guide for yarn on a loom) to another woman; when she returned to retrieve it, the two argued and fell into the pond. Their dispute became an atmospheric ghost fire, still said to be burning. Legend has it that misfortune befalls anyone who sees the fire.

Obora
Related in legends on Ōmi Island in Ehime Prefecture, it is said to be the spiritual fire of a deceased person. In Miyakubo village, Ochi District in the same prefecture (now Imabari), they are known as oborabi. A legend exists of atmospheric ghost fires appearing above the sea or at graves; these are sometimes the same kind of fire.

Kane no Kami no Hi (金の神の火; lit. "fire of the metal god")
Related in legends on Nuwa Island, Ehime Prefecture and in the folklore publication Sōgō Nippon Minzoku Goi, this is a fire appearing at night on New Year's Eve behind the patron Shinto god's shrine on Nuwa Island. It is accompanied by sounds similar to human screaming, and is interpreted by local residents as a sign that the goddess of luck has appeared.

Kinka (金火; lit. "gold fire")
This fire appeared in the fantasy collection, Sanshū Kidan. It is said to appear at Hachiman, Jōshikaidō and Komatsu as a fuse-like atmospheric ghost light.

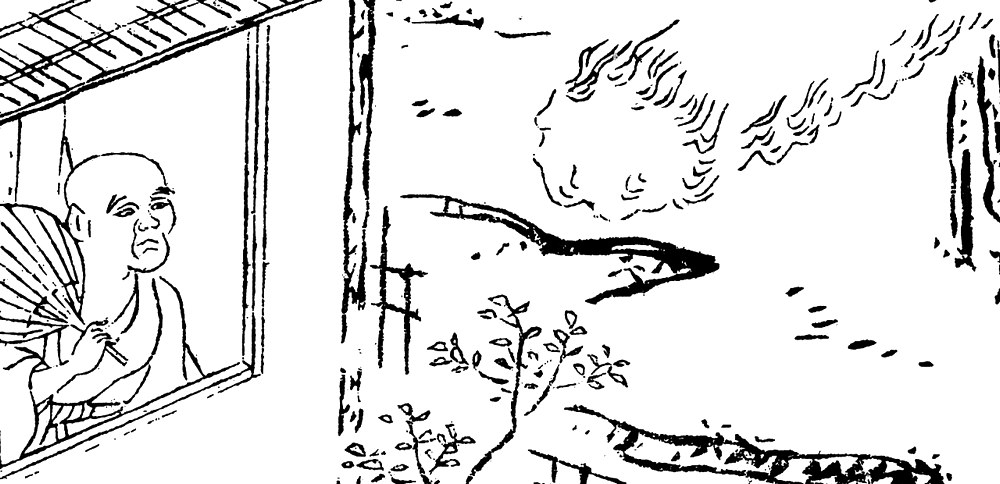
Sayō Shunsō Anzekyū Ika wo Mishi Mono from Nishihari Kaidan Jikki

Kumobi (蜘蛛火; lit. "spider fire")
In a legend in Tenkō village, Shiki District, Nara Prefecture (now Sakurai), hundreds of spiders became a ball of fire in the air and one would die upon contact with it. Similarly, in Tamashimayashima, Kurashiki, Okayama Prefecture the Kumo no Hi is said to be the work of spiders. As a red ball of fire appears above the forest near the Inari shrine on the island, it is said to dance around above the mountains and forest and then disappear. In Banshū (now Hyōgo Prefecture), according to Nishihari Kaidan Jikki (in the section "Sayō Shunsō Anzekyū Ika wo Mishi Mono") an atmospheric ghost light would appear in the village of Sayō, Sayō District, Banshū. Although "perhaps it is a spider fire", its details have not been made clear.

Gongorōbi (権五郎火; lit. "Gongorō fire")
In legends from the area around Honjō-ji, Sanjō, Niigata Prefecture, Isono no Gongorō, after winning at gambling, was killed; his murder became an atmospheric ghost light. At a nearby family farm Gongorōbi is a sign of impending rain, and peasants who see it hurry to retrieve their rice-drying racks.

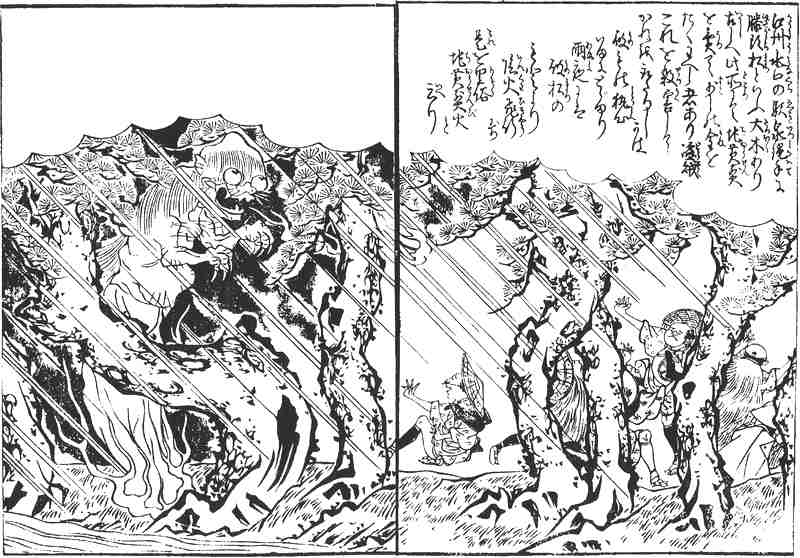
Jōsenbi from Ehon Sayo Shigure by Shungyōsai Hayami

Jōsenbi (地黄煎火; lit. "Jōsen fire")
In a Yomihon (Ehon Sayo Shigure) from the Edo period, at Minakuchi, Ōmi (now Kōka, Shiga Prefecture) there was a person who made a livelihood out of selling jōsen (candy made from the sap of Rehmannia glutinosa, boiled into a paste) who was killed by a robber. It is said that the vendor became an atmospheric ghost fire, floating on rainy nights.

Sōrikanko
Told in legends of Shioire, Oodachi, Hachinohe, Aomori Prefecture, its name means "the Kanko of Shioiri village". A beautiful girl named Kanko received many marriage proposals, but refused them all since she loved someone else. One of her suitors buried her alive in the Niida River, and her atmospheric ghost light became able to fly. When a cement factory was later built there, a small shrine to Kanko was included.

Susuke Chōchin (煤け提灯; lit. "stained paper lantern")
Told in the legends of Niigata Prefecture, on rainy nights it would fly airily around a place where bodies are washed for burial.

Nobi (野火; lit. "field fire")
A legend from Nagaoka District, Tosa Province (now Kōchi Prefecture), nobi appears in a variety of locations. An umbrella-sized fire would float, bursting apart into star-like lights that would spread from four or five shaku to several hundreds of meters apart. It is said that by putting saliva on a zōri and calling it, it would dance brilliantly in the sky above one's head.

== Norway ==
The Hessdalen lights are unexplained lights occurring in the remote valley of Hessdalen, with reports dating back to at least the 1930s.

== United Kingdom ==
The Longdendale lights are lights reported in the sky over part of the Peak District in northern England, with stories dating back hundreds of years.

== United States ==
The Spooklight is a stationary light appearing west of the small town of Hornet, Missouri. The Paulding Light is a similar phenomenon in Michigan. Scientific investigation revealed both to be caused by distant car headlights.

The Marfa lights are a reported atmospheric light phenomenon in Texas.

The Brown Mountain lights are purported ghost lights near Brown Mountain in North Carolina.

The Gurdon Light is a multicolored light near Gurdon, Arkansas. Featured on local media and on Unsolved Mysteries.
