= Japan National Route 417 =

Road in Japan

National Route 417
- 国道417号
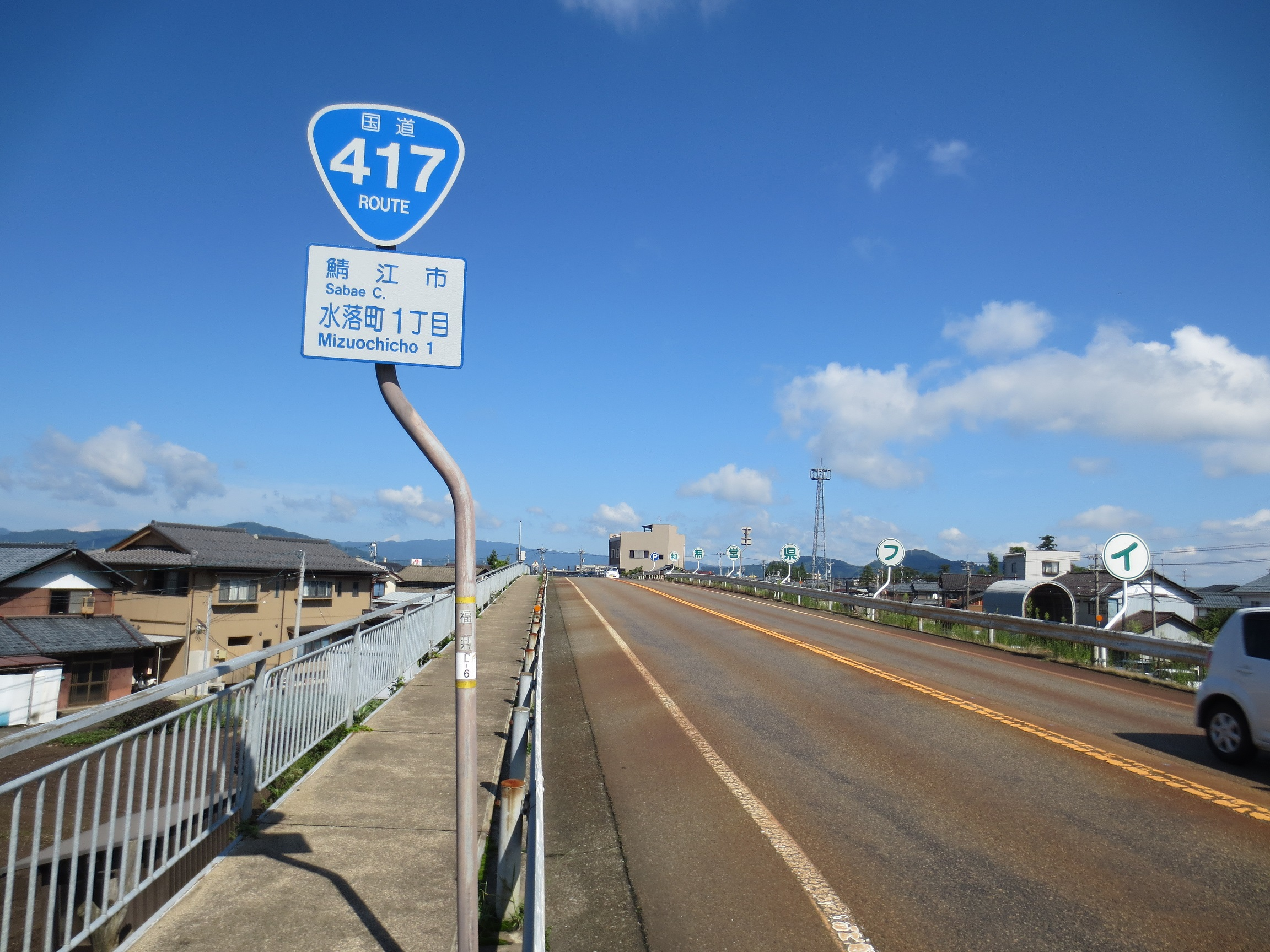

Route information
- Length: 143 km (89 mi)

Location
- Country: Japan

Highway system
- National highways of Japan; Expressways of Japan
← National Route 416	→ National Route 418

National Route 417 is a national highway of Japan connecting Ōgaki, Gifu and Minamiechizen, Fukui in Japan, with a total length of 143 km (88.86 mi).
