= Ibi District =

District in Gifu Prefecture, Japan

Coordinates: 35.553°N 136.477°E

Location of Ibi District in Gifu Prefecture

Ibi District (揖斐郡, Ibi-gun) is a district located in Gifu Prefecture, Japan. As of July 2011, the district has an estimated population of 72,109. The total area is 876.65 km^{2}.

The area of the former village of Tokuyama in this district will be flooded by the Tokuyama Dam.

== Towns and villages ==
- Ibigawa
- Ikeda
- Ōno

== District Timeline ==
- April 1, 1987 - The village of Tokuyama merged into the village of Fujihashi.
- January 31, 2005 - The villages of Fujihashi, Kasuga, Kuze, Sakauchi, and Tanigumi merged into the expanded town of Ibigawa.
