= List of cities in Gifu Prefecture by population =

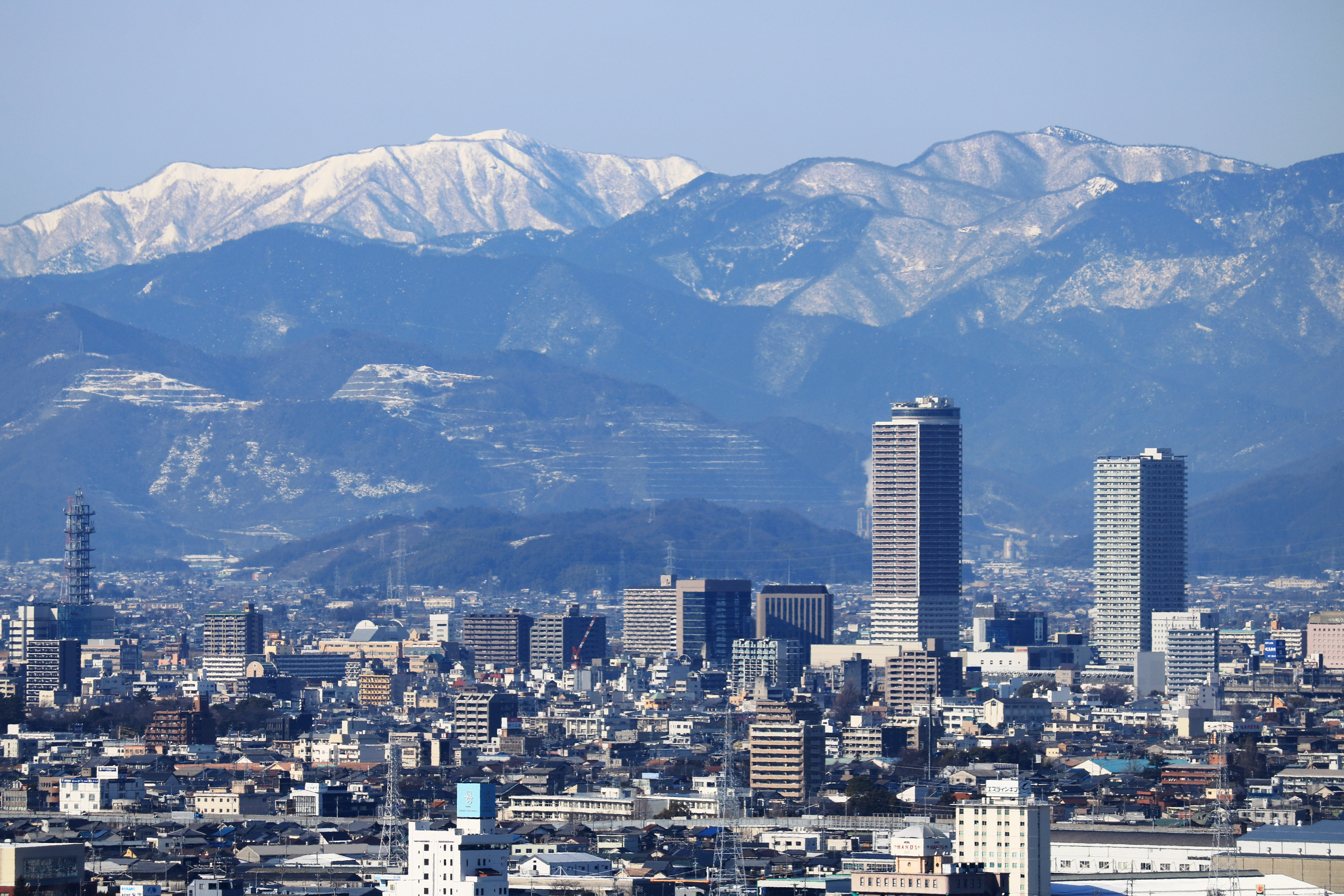
1. Gifu

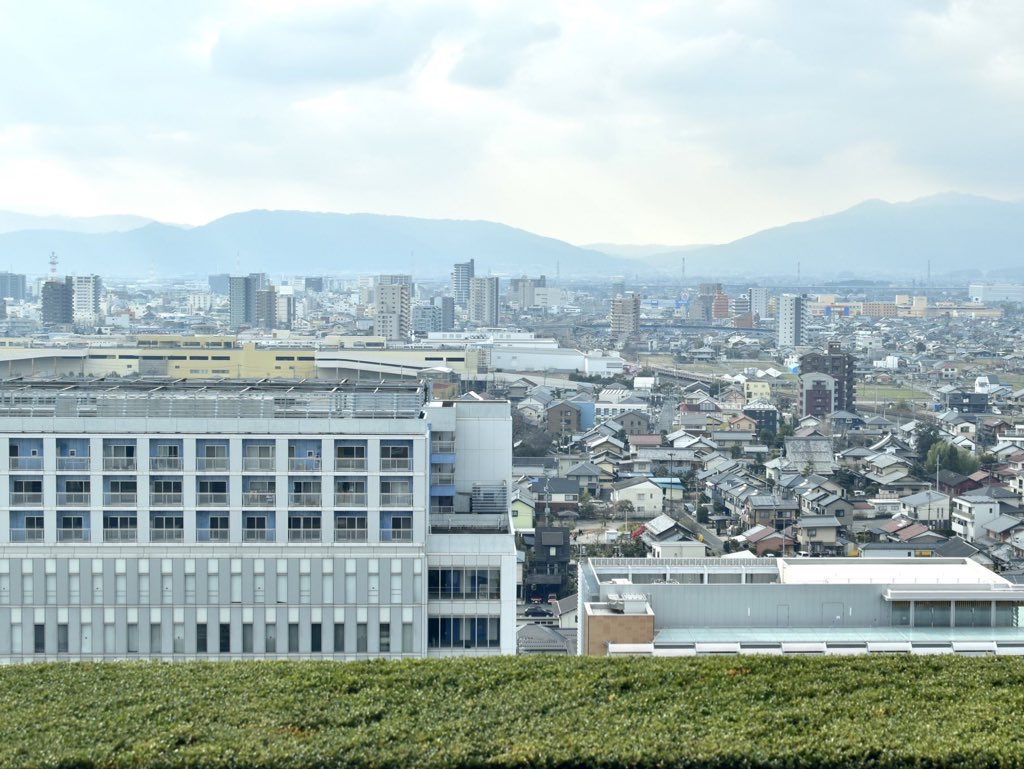
2. Ōgaki

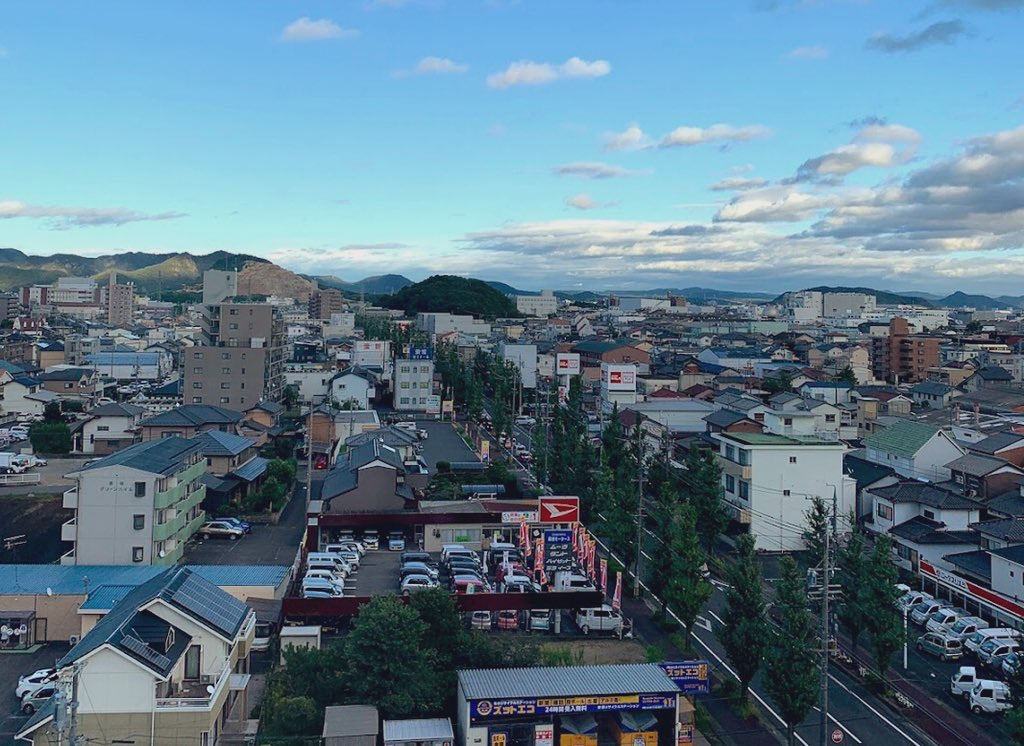
3. Kakamigahara

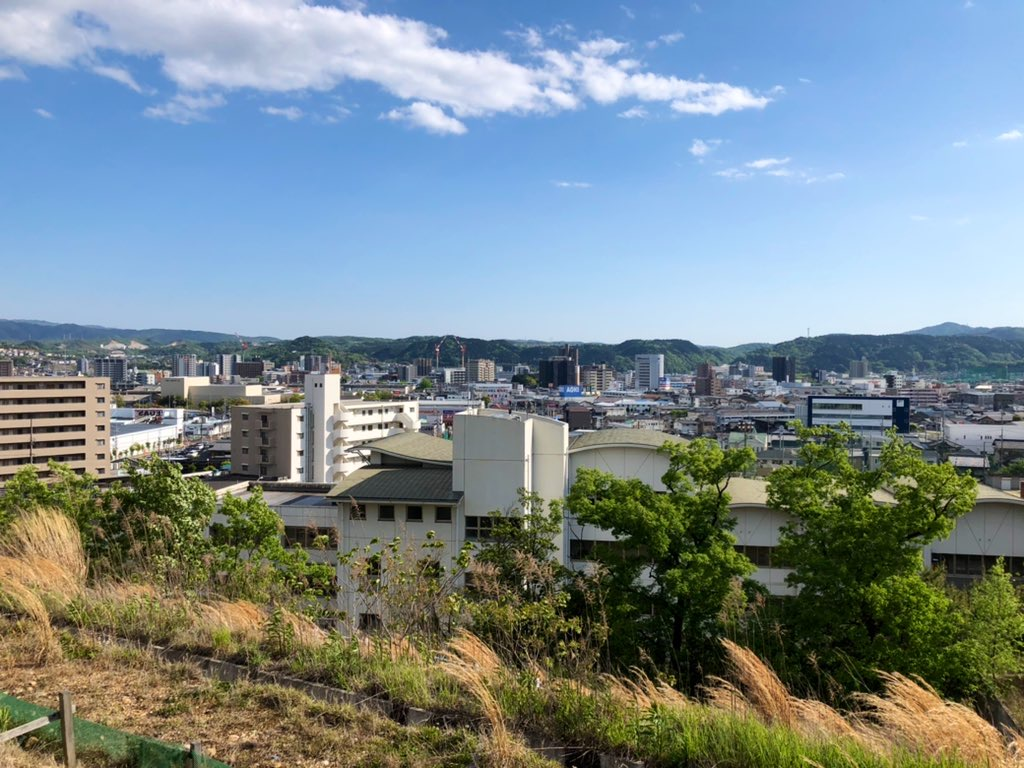
4. Tajimi

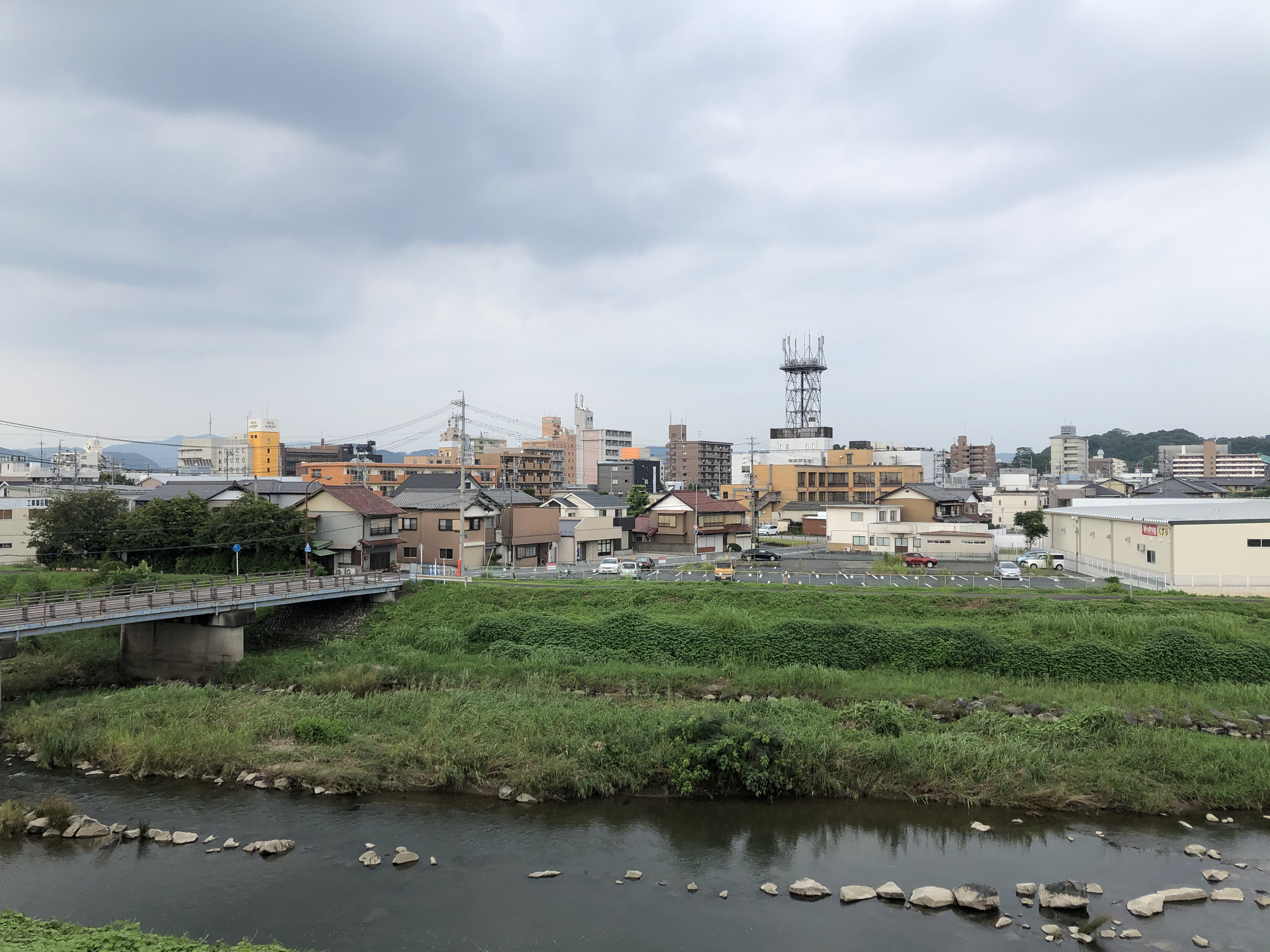
5. Kani

The following table lists the 34 cities, towns and villages in Gifu Prefecture with a population of at least 10,000 on October 1, 2020, according to the 2020 Census. The table also gives an overview of the evolution of the population since the 1995 census.

== List ==
Rank (2020)	Name	Status	2020	2015	2010	2005	2000	1995
1	Gifu	City	402,742	406,735	413,136	413,367	415,085	418,574
2	Ōgaki	City	158,342	159,879	161,160	162,070	161,827	161,679
3	Kakamigahara	City	144,619	144,690	145,604	144,174	141,765	141,055
4	Tajimi	City	106,810	110,441	112,595	114,876	115,740	113,079
5	Kani	City	100,037	98,695	97,436	97,686	93,463	88,372
6	Seki	City	85,283	89,153	91,418	92,597	92,061	90,147
7	Takayama	City	84,463	89,182	92,747	96,231	97,023	96,680
8	Nakatsugawa	City	76,658	78,883	80,910	84,080	85,004	85,387
9	Hashima	City	65,684	67,337	67,197	66,730	64,713	63,962
10	Minokamo	City	56,718	55,384	54,729	52,133	50,063	46,065
11	Mizuho	City	56,411	54,354	51,950	50,009	46,571	43,892
12	Toki	City	55,374	57,827	60,475	63,283	63,283	65,631
13	Ena	City	47,818	51,073	53,718	55,761	57,274	58,107
14	Gujō	City	39,003	42,090	44,491	47,495	49,377	50,809
15	Mizunami	City	37,175	38,730	40,387	42,065	42,298	42,003
16	Motosu	City	32,940	33,995	35,047	34,603	33,900	33,297
17	Kaizu	City	32,749	35,206	37,941	39,453	41,204	41,694
18	Gero	City	30,443	33,585	36,314	38,494	40,102	41,029
19	Yōrō	Town	26,897	29,029	31,332	32,550	33,256	33,694
20	Tarui	Town	26,419	27,556	28,505	28,895	28,935	28,736
21	Ginan	Town	25,890	24,622	23,804	22,776	22,137	21,251
22	Yamagata	City	25,291	27,114	29,629	30,316	30,951	31,534
23	Ikeda	Town	23,378	24,347	24,980	24,559	23,820	23,153
24	Hida	City	22,556	24,696	26,732	28,902	30,421	31,247
25	Kasamatsu	Town	22,220	22,750	22,809	22,696	22,319	21,682
26	Ōno	Town	22,048	23,453	23,859	23,788	23,071	22,079
27	Ibigawa	Town	19,535	21,503	23,784	26,192	27,453	28,368
28	Mino	City	19,267	20,760	22,629	23,390	24,662	25,969
29	Gōdo	Town	18,587	19,282	20,065	20,830	20,750	20,687
30	Kitagata	Town	18,148	18,169	18,395	17,547	17,250	17,027
31	Mitake	Town	17,529	18,111	18,824	19,272	19,653	19,980
32	Anpachi	Town	14,355	14,752	15,271	15,263	15,078	15,115
33	Yaotsu	Town	10,201	11,027	12,045	12,935	13,632	14,323
