= Gifu 2nd district =

Legislative district of Japan

Gifu 2nd District
- Parliamentary constituency for the Japanese House of Representatives
- Numbered map of Gifu Prefecture single-member districts
- Prefecture: Gifu
- Proportional District: Tōkai
- Electorate: 298,922

Current constituency
- Created: 1994
- Seats: One
- Party: Liberal Democratic
- Representative: Yasufumi Tanahashi
- Municipalities: Ōgaki, Kaizu, Anpachi District, Fuwa District, Ibi District and Yōrō District

Gifu 2nd district (岐阜県第2区, Gifu-ken dai-niku or simply 岐阜2区, Gifu-niku) is a single-member constituency of the House of Representatives in the national Diet of Japan located in Gifu Prefecture.

== List of representatives ==
Election	Representative	Party	Notes
1996	Yasufumi Tanahashi	Liberal Democratic	
2000	Yasufumi Tanahashi	Liberal Democratic	
2003	Yasufumi Tanahashi	Liberal Democratic	
2005	Yasufumi Tanahashi	Liberal Democratic	
2009	Yasufumi Tanahashi	Liberal Democratic	
2012	Yasufumi Tanahashi	Liberal Democratic	
2014	Yasufumi Tanahashi	Liberal Democratic	
2017	Yasufumi Tanahashi	Liberal Democratic	
2021	Yasufumi Tanahashi	Liberal Democratic	
2024	Yasufumi Tanahashi	Liberal Democratic	
2026	Yasufumi Tanahashi	Liberal Democratic	

== Election results ==
2026
Party	Candidate	Votes	%	±%
LDP	Yasufumi Tanahashi	87,826	54.6	▼7.3
DPP	Miho Nomura (Won a Seat in the PR Block)	44,679	27.8	
Sanseitō	Masaya Tsukahara	14,203	8.8	
Independent	Rie Karasawa	7,663	4.8	
Independent	Ayumi Itō	6,582	4.1	▼11.1
Turnout		160,953	57.47	▲4.4
LDP hold				

2024
Party	Candidate	Votes	%	±%
LDP	Yasufumi Tanahashi	91,183	61.9	▼3.9
JCP	Keiji Mio	33,634	22.8	▲12.9
Independent	Ayumi Itō	22,456	15.2	
Turnout			53.07	▼3.02
LDP hold				

2021
Party	Candidate	Votes	%	±%
Liberal Democratic (endorsed by Komeito)	Yasufumi Tanahashi (Incumbent)	108,755	65.79	
DPP	Yuriko Ohtani	40,179	24.31	New
Communist	Keiji Mio	16,374	9.91	
Registered electors		300,608		
Turnout			56.09	▲3.65
LDP hold				

2017
Party	Candidate	Votes	%	±%
Liberal Democratic (endorsed by Komeito)	Yasufumi Tanahashi (Incumbent)	117,278	75.40	
Communist	Fusayoshi Morizakura	38,270	24.60	
Registered electors		309,088		
Turnout			52.44	▲3.40
LDP hold				

2014
Party	Candidate	Votes	%	±%
Liberal Democratic (endorsed by Komeito)	Yasufumi Tanahashi (Incumbent)	108,234	75.52	
Communist	Fusayoshi Morizakura	35,092	24.48	
Registered electors		306,240		
Turnout			49.04	▼11.32
LDP hold				

2012
Party	Candidate	Votes	%	±%
Liberal Democratic (endorsed by Komeito)	Yasufumi Tanahashi (Incumbent)	114,983	63.44	
Tomorrow	Ben Hashimoto (PR seat Incumbent)	31,622	17.45	New
Democratic	Makoto Hori	22,790	12.57	
Communist	Mitsuhiro Takagi	11,855	6.54	
Registered electors		309,921		
Turnout			60.36	▼10.84
LDP hold				

2009
Party	Candidate	Votes	%	±%
Liberal Democratic	Yasufumi Tanahashi (Incumbent)	118,198	54.19	
Democratic	Ben Hashimoto (Won PR seat)	95,750	43.90	
Happiness Realization	Akira Hamanishi	4,150	1.90	New
Registered electors		311,445		
Turnout			71.20	
LDP hold				

2005
Party	Candidate	Votes	%	±%
Liberal Democratic	Yasufumi Tanahashi (Incumbent)	130,953	61.77	
Democratic	Rina Ōishi	66,823	31.52	
Communist	Mitsuhiro Takagi	14,224	6.71	
Turnout				
LDP hold				

2003
Party	Candidate	Votes	%	±%
Liberal Democratic	Yasufumi Tanahashi (Incumbent)	118,748	61.62	
Democratic	Rina Ōishi	60,118	31.20	
Communist	Mitsuhiro Takagi	13,846	7.18	
Turnout				
LDP hold				

2000
Party	Candidate	Votes	%	±%
Liberal Democratic	Yasufumi Tanahashi (Incumbent)	120,053	57.26	
Democratic	Shojiro Kojima	75,983	36.24	New
Communist	Fusayoshi Morizakura	13,635	6.50	
Turnout			73.98	
LDP hold				

1996
Party	Candidate	Votes	%	±%
Liberal Democratic	Yasufumi Tanahashi	94,796	51.73	New
New Frontier	Shojiro Kojima	69,808	38.10	New
Communist	Yuji Nishimoto	18,640	10.17	New
Turnout				
LDP win (new seat)				
