= Mizuho, Gifu =

Mizuho 瑞穂市
- City
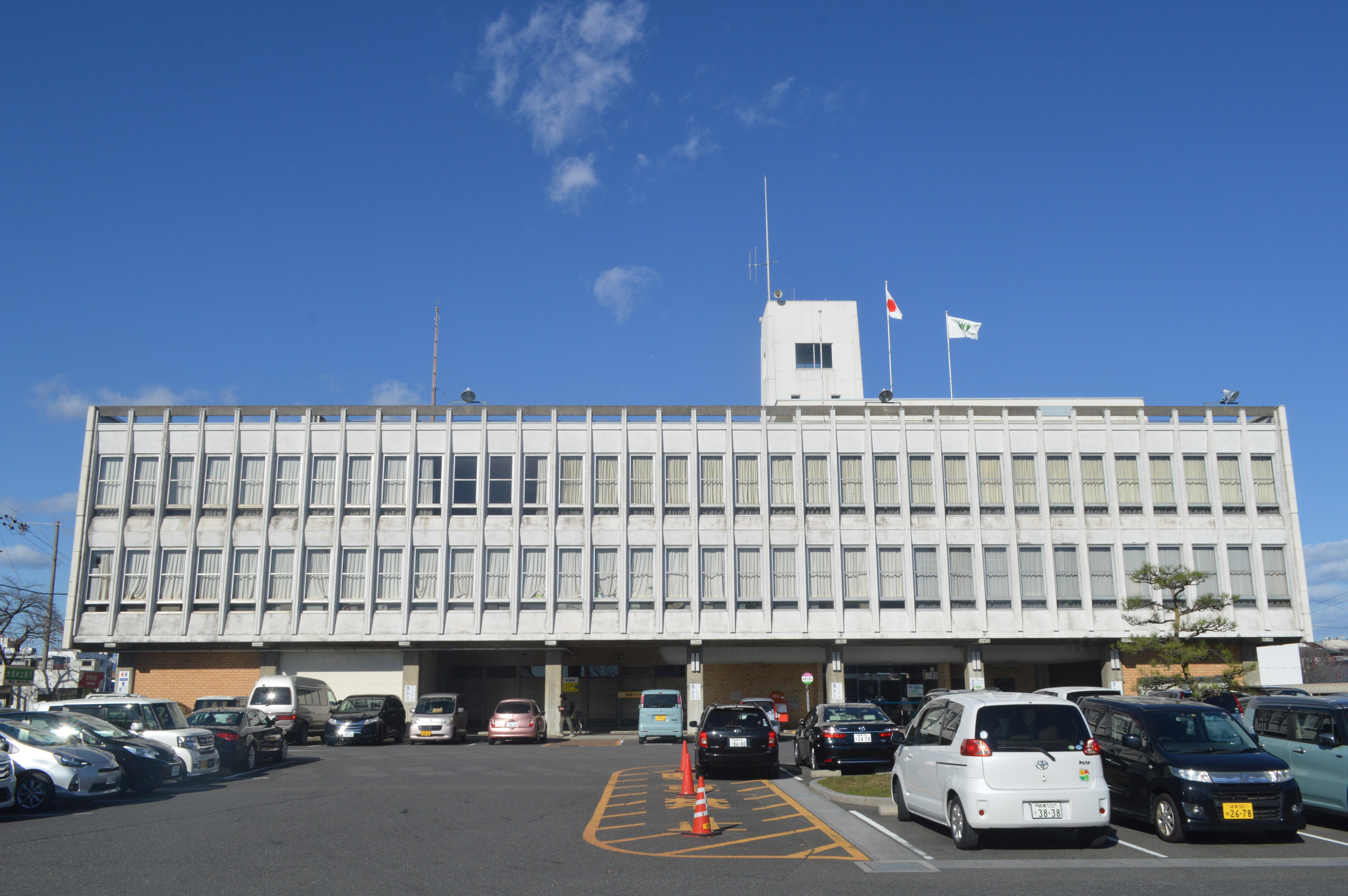
- Mizuho City Hall

- Flag Seal

- ■ Location of Mizuho in Gifu Prefecture

- Coordinates: 35°23′30.5″N 136°41′27.1″E
- Country: Japan
- Region: Chūbu
- Prefecture: Gifu

Government
  - Mayor: Toshiaki Tanahashi (since June 2015)

Area
  - Total: 28.19 km^{2} (10.88 sq mi)

Population (November 30, 2018)
  - Total: 54,686
  - Density: 1,940/km^{2} (5,024/sq mi)
- Time zone: UTC+9 (Japan Standard Time)
- City symbols
- Tree: Sakura
- Flower: Hydrangea
- Phone number: 058-327-4111
- Address: 1288 Beppu, Mizuho-shi, Gifu-ken 501-0293
- Website: Official website

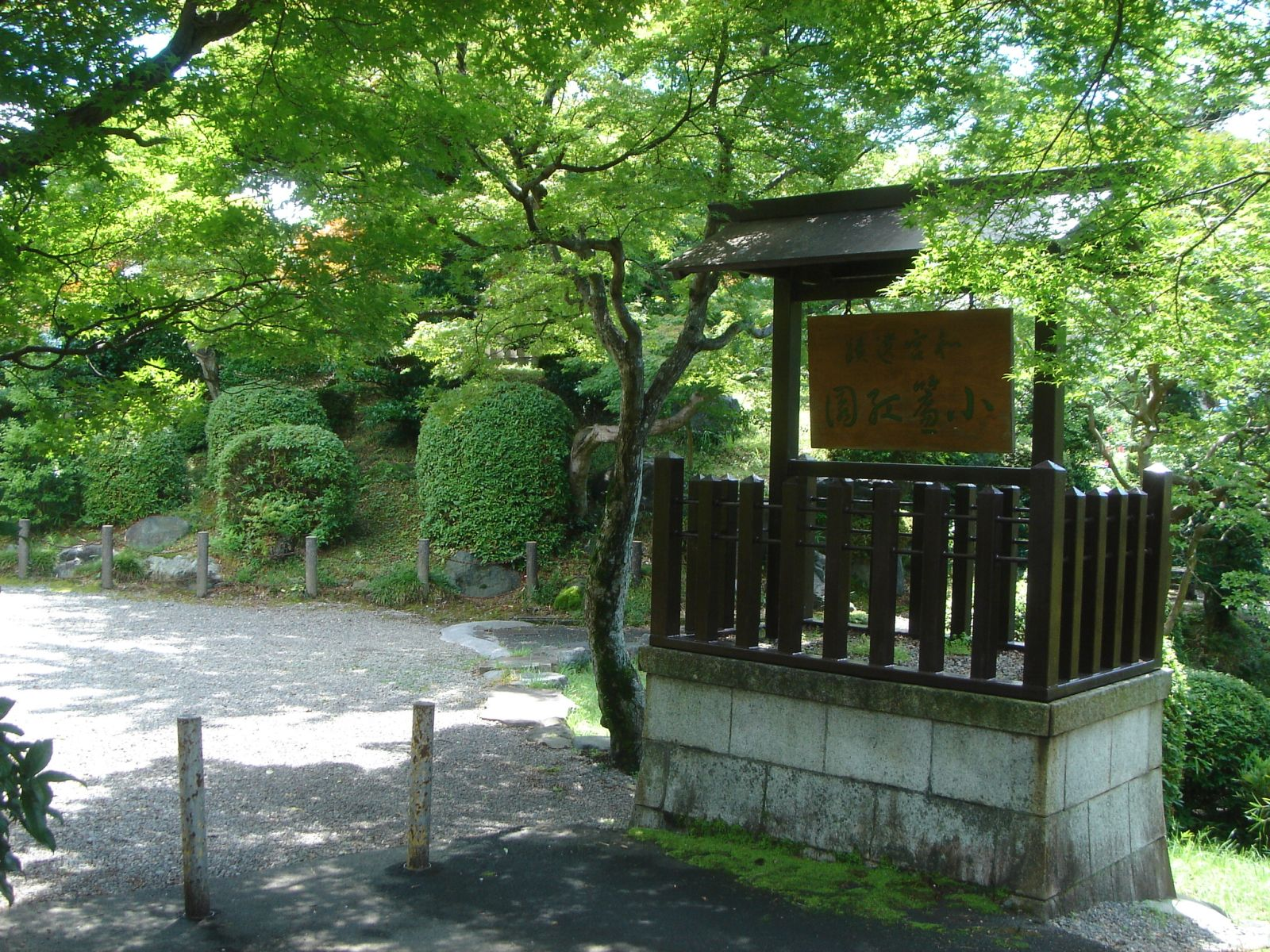
Ozu Park

Mizuho (瑞穂市, Mizuho-shi) is a village located in Gifu, Japan. As of 31 March 2024, the city had an estimated population of 56,168 and a population density of 1951 persons per km^{2}, in 23,756 households. The total area of the city was 28.19 square kilometres (10.88 sq mi).

== Geography ==
Mizuho is located in south-west Gifu Prefecture in the northwestern part of the Nōbi Plain, sandwiched between the cities of Gifu and Ōgaki. The Nagara River and the Ibi River flow through the city. Mizuho is surrounded by the city of Seki to the west, south and east, and by the city of Gujō to the north.

=== Climate ===
The city has a climate characterized by characterized by hot and humid summers, and mild winters (Köppen climate classification Cfa). The average annual temperature in Mizuho is 15.1 °C. The average annual rainfall is 1942 mm with September as the wettest month. The temperatures are highest on average in August, at around 27.9 °C, and lowest in January, at around 4.1 °C.

=== Neighbouring municipalities ===
- Gifu Prefecture
  - Cities of Gifu, Ōgaki and Motosu
  - Towns of Kitagata (Motosu District) and Anpachi and Gōdo (Anpachi District)

== Demographics ==
Per Japanese census data, the population of Mizuho has increased rapidly over the past 50 years.

Historical population
Year	Pop.	±%
1970	21,236	—
1980	32,247	+51.9%
1990	40,074	+24.3%
2000	46,571	+16.2%
2010	51,950	+11.6%
2020	56,388	+8.5%

== History ==
The area around Mizuho was part of traditional Mino Province. During the Edo period, Mieji-juku prospered as a post station: on the Nakasendo highway connecting Edo with Kyoto. Under the Tokugawa shogunate, most of the area of Mizuho was part of Ogaki Domain or was tenryō territory administered by various hatamoto. In the post-Meiji restoration cadastral reforms, Motosu District in Gifu prefecture was created, and with the establishment of the modern municipalities system on July 1, 1889, the town of Kozuchi was created. The modern city of Mizuho was established on May 1, 2003, from the merger of the towns of Hozumi (穂積) and Sunami (巣南). (both from Motosu District).

== Government ==
Mizuho has a mayor-council form of government with a directly elected mayor and a unicameral city legislature of 18 members.

== Education ==
=== Universities ===
- Asahi University

=== Primary and secondary education ===
Mizuho has seven public elementary schools and three public middle schools operated by the city government. The city does not have a high school.

== Transportation ==
=== Railway ===
- Central Japan Railway Company - Tōkaidō Main Line
  - Hozumi
- Tarumi Railway - Tarumi Line
  - Yokoya - Jūkujō - Mieji

=== Highway ===
- National Route 21
