= IAMAS =

IAMAS may refer to:

- International Association of Meteorology and Atmospheric Sciences
- Institute of Advanced Media Arts and Sciences
