= Toda Ujitaka =

Toda clan chieftain

Junior First Rank Count Toda Ujitaka
- 戸田 氏共
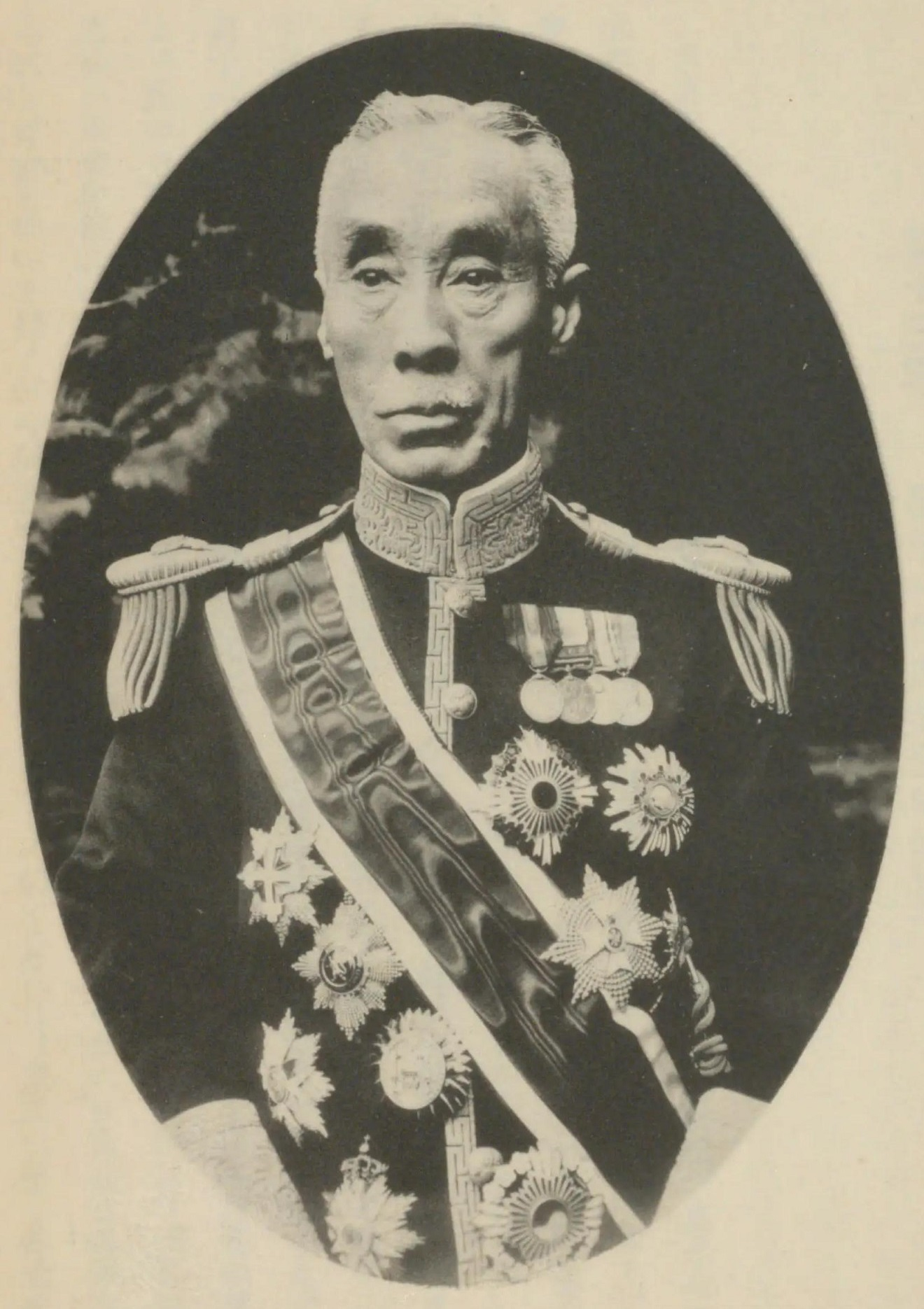
- Count Toda c. 1930

11th Daimyō of Ōgaki Domain
- In office 1865–1869
- Monarchs: Shōgun: Tokugawa Iemochi; Tokugawa Yoshinobu
- Preceded by: Toda Ujiakira
- Succeeded by: -- none--

Imperial Governor of Ōgaki
- In office July 24, 1869 – August 29, 1871
- Monarch: Emperor Meiji

Personal details
- Born: July 23, 1854 Ōgaki, Mino, Japan
- Died: February 17, 1936 (aged 81) Tokyo, Japan
- Spouse(s): Kiwako, daughter of Prince Iwakura Tomomi
- Parent: Toda Ujimasa (father)

Count Toda Ujitaka (戸田 氏共; July 23, 1854 – February 17, 1936) was the 11th and final daimyō of Ōgaki Domain under the Bakumatsu period Tokugawa Shogunate of Japan. He was the 12th hereditary chieftain of the Toda clan. During the Meiji period, he was a diplomat and served as ambassador of Japan to Switzerland and Austria-Hungary.

== Biography ==
Toda Ujitaka was the fifth son of the 9th daimyō of Ōgaki Domain, Toda Ujimasa. He was posthumously adopted to succeed his elder brother, Toda Ujiakira, the 10th daimyō in 1865. The following year he was awarded the courtesy titles of Uneme-no-kami and Lower Fourth court rank. In 1868, following the defeat of shogunal forces at the Battle of Toba-Fushimi, he was branded an "enemy of the crown"; however, due to an eloquent petition by the domain karō and an apology, he was pardoned and ordered to serve as messenger of the court to other domains along the Tōsandō to urge them to submit to the imperial government. In 1869, with the abolition of the title of daimyō, he became imperial governor of Ōgaki.

In 1870, he enrolled in the new Daigaku Nankō and the following year resigned from all of his posts and set sail from Yokohama for the United States, together with his brother Toda Kindō.After his return to Japan, in October 1879, he was accepted into the Ministry of Education. In 1882, he accompanied Itō Hirobumi on an 18-month trip to Europe to study European constitutional systems to prepare for a constitution for Japan. With the establishment of kazoku peerage on July 8, 1884, he was made a count (hakushaku).

After his return to Japan, Toda became a counselor for the Foreign Ministry. In 1887, he was appointed envoy extraordinary and minister plenipotentiary to Austria-Hungary and Switzerland. He returned to Japan in 1892 to accept a post as official huntsman for the Imperial Household Ministry. He continued with the Imperial Household Ministry in various positions, rising to sea dof the Department of Ceremonies in 1908, holding that position until his retirement in 1928.

On his death in 1936, he was one of the last of the surviving daimyō. His funeral was held according to Shinto rites at the Tokiwa Jinja in Ōgaki. His wife Kiwako was a daughter of Prince Iwakura Tomomi, and died herself less than a month later.

== Honors ==
- 1885 - Order of the Rising Sun, 3rd class
- 1897 - Order of the Sacred Treasure, 2nd class
- 1906 - Order of the Rising Sun, 2nd class
- 1907 - Order of the Sacred Treasure, 1st class
- 1914 - Order of the Rising Sun, 1st class
- 1921 - Order of the Rising Sun with Paulownia Flowers
