= Sunomata, Gifu =

Dissolved municipality in Gifu prefecture, Japan

Location of Sunomata in Gifu Prefecture

Sunomata (墨俣町, Sunomata-chō) was a town located in Anpachi District, Gifu Prefecture, Japan.

As of 2003, the town had an estimated population of 4,652 and a density of 1,372.39 persons per km^{2}. The total area was 3.39 km^{2}.

On March 27, 2006, Sunomata, along with the town of Kamiishizu (from Yōrō District), was merged into the expanded city of Ōgaki.
