= Ogaki Women's College =

Coordinates: 35°23′11.2″N 136°36′29.4″E

- 大垣女子短期大学
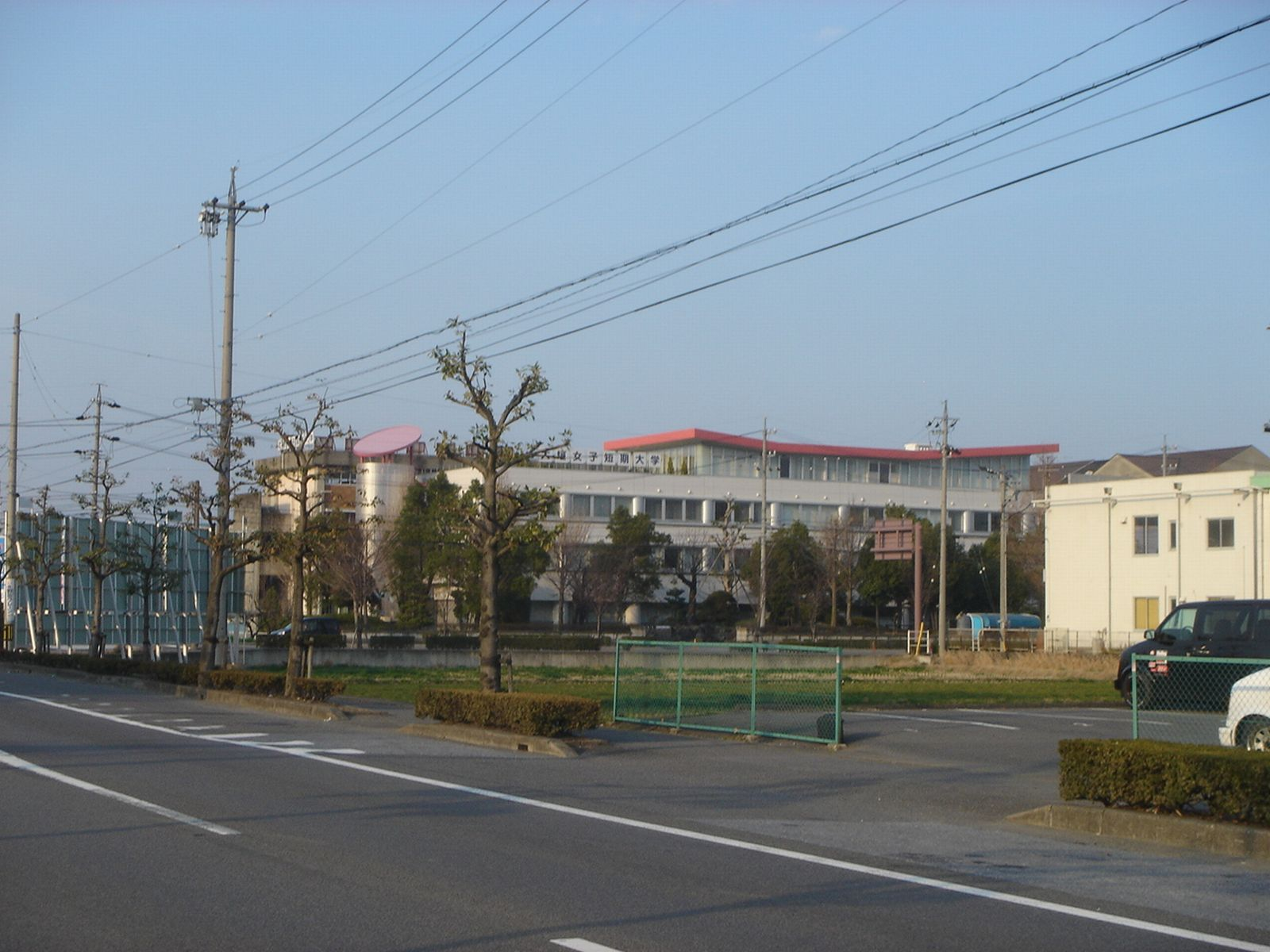
- Ogaki Women's College
- Type: Private
- Location: Ōgaki, Gifu, Japan
- Website: http://www.ogaki-tandai.ac.jp/

Ogaki Women's College (大垣女子短期大学, Ōgaki joshi tanki daigaku) is a private women's junior college in Ōgaki, Gifu, Japan, established in 1969.
