= Arashiyama Jirō =

Japanese sumo wrestler (born 1943)

Personal information
- Native name: 嵐山 次郎
- Born: Jirō Ebi; 14 December 1943 (age 82) Anpachi, Gifu, Japan
- Height: 1.79 m (5 ft 10 1/2 in)
- Weight: 110 kg (240 lb)

Sport
- Sport: Sumo
- Retired: May, 1972
- Heya: Miyagino
- Record: 327-298-15
- Debut: March, 1960
- Highest rank: Maegashira 12 (November, 1966)
- Championships: 1 (Jūryō)
- Updated on Sep. 2012

Arashiyama Jirō (born 14 December 1943 as Jirō Ebi) is a former sumo wrestler from Anpachi, Gifu, Japan. He made his professional debut in March 1960 and reached the top division in March 1970. His highest rank was maegashira 12. He left the sumo world upon retirement from active competition in May 1972.

== Career record ==
Arashiyama Jirō
Year	January Hatsu basho, Tokyo	March Haru basho, Osaka	May Natsu basho, Tokyo	July Nagoya basho, Nagoya	September Aki basho, Tokyo	November Kyūshū basho, Fukuoka
1960	x	(Maezumo)	(Maezumo)	West Jonokuchi #24; 2–5	East Jonokuchi #11; 4–3	East Jonidan #73; 3–4
1961	East Jonidan #81; 4–3	East Jonidan #39; 3–4	East Jonidan #51; 3–4	East Jonidan #64; 5–2	East Jonidan #14; 3–4	East Jonidan #25; 5–2
1962	East Sandanme #95; 4–3	West Sandanme #74; 5–2	West Sandanme #39; 4–3	West Sandanme #33; 3–4	West Sandanme #43; Sat out due to injury 0–0–7	West Sandanme #82; 4–3
1963	West Sandanme #68; 6–1	West Sandanme #18; 2–5	West Sandanme #42; 4–3	West Sandanme #22; 5–2	East Makushita #87; 5–2	East Makushita #62; 4–3
1964	West Makushita #54; 5–2	East Makushita #39; 2–5	East Makushita #53; 4–3	East Makushita #49; 3–4	West Makushita #59; 5–2	East Makushita #43; 5–2
1965	East Makushita #33; 1–5–1	East Makushita #57; 1–6	West Makushita #82; 4–3	East Makushita #78; 5–2	West Makushita #57; 5–2	East Makushita #39; 6–1
1966	West Makushita #23; 3–4	West Makushita #25; 4–3	East Makushita #23; 3–4	East Makushita #28; 4–3	East Makushita #24; 6–1	West Makushita #12; 6–1
1967	East Makushita #3; 5–2	West Jūryō #18; 8–7	West Makushita #3; 4–3	East Makushita #2; 3–4	East Makushita #5; 4–3	West Makushita #2; 2–5
1968	West Makushita #14; 5–2	East Makushita #10; 6–1	West Makushita #1; 4–3	West Jūryō #13; 8–7	West Jūryō #10; 8–7	West Jūryō #8; 7–8
1969	East Jūryō #9; 4–11	East Makushita #2; 5–2	West Jūryō #13; 8–7	East Jūryō #8; 11–4; Champion	East Jūryō #1; 4–11	West Jūryō #8; 9–6
1970	West Jūryō #3; 8–7	East Maegashira #12; 4–11	West Jūryō #5; 6–9	East Jūryō #10; 8–7	East Jūryō #8; 3–12	West Makushita #1; 3–4
1971	West Makushita #6; 4–3	West Makushita #4; 2–5	East Makushita #17; 5–2	East Makushita #8; 5–2	East Makushita #2; 5–2	West Jūryō #12; 8–7
1972	West Jūryō #9; 6–9	East Jūryō #12; 5–10	East Makushita #5; Retired; 0–0–7			
Record given as wins–losses–absences Top division champion Top division runner-up Retired Lower divisions Non-participation Sanshō key: F=Fighting spirit; O=Outstanding performance; T=Technique Also shown: ★=Kinboshi; P=Playoff(s); Divisions: Makuuchi — Jūryō — Makushita — Sandanme — Jonidan — Jonokuchi Makuuchi ranks: Yokozuna — Ōzeki — Sekiwake — Komusubi — Maegashira

== See also ==
- Glossary of sumo terms
- List of past sumo wrestlers
- List of sumo tournament second division champions
