= Ibiden =

Japanese electronics company

Ibiden Co., Ltd.

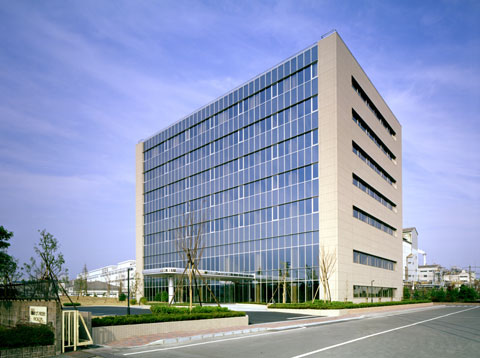
- Ibiden headquarters building
- Native name: イビデン株式会社
- Company type: Public KK
- Traded as: TYO: 4062
- ISIN: JP3148800000
- Industry: Electronics
- Founded: November 25, 1912; 113 years ago as Ibigawa Electric Power
- Founder: Yujiro Tachikawa
- Headquarters: Ogaki, Gifu, 503-8604, Japan
- Area served: Worldwide
- Key people: Hiroki Takenaka (President and CEO)
- Products: Printed wiring boards; Package substrates; Ceramic products; Graphite specialty products; Fine ceramics
- Revenue: JPY 370 billion (FY 2024) (US$ 2.4 billion) (FY 2024)
- Net income: ¥31 billion (FY 2024) (US$ 210 million) (FY 2024)
- Number of employees: 14,290 (as of March 31, 2016)
- Website: Official website

Ibiden Co., Ltd. (イビデン株式会社, Ibiden Kabushiki-kaisha) is a Japanese electronics company headquartered in Ogaki, Gifu prefecture that manufactures electronics-related products, such as printed circuit boards and IC packaging. The company also makes ceramics products, including particulate filters for diesel engines, for which it has a 50% market share in Europe.

Ibiden was founded as an electrical power generation company in 1912. In the following decades the company diversified its operations and products, from power generation to electric furnace products (between 1917 and 1919), building materials (in 1960), printed circuit board (in 1972) and ceramic fibers (in 1974).

Today electronic components and ceramics are the company's main products, with customers including Apple Inc., Intel and Groupe PSA (PSA Peugeot Citroën).

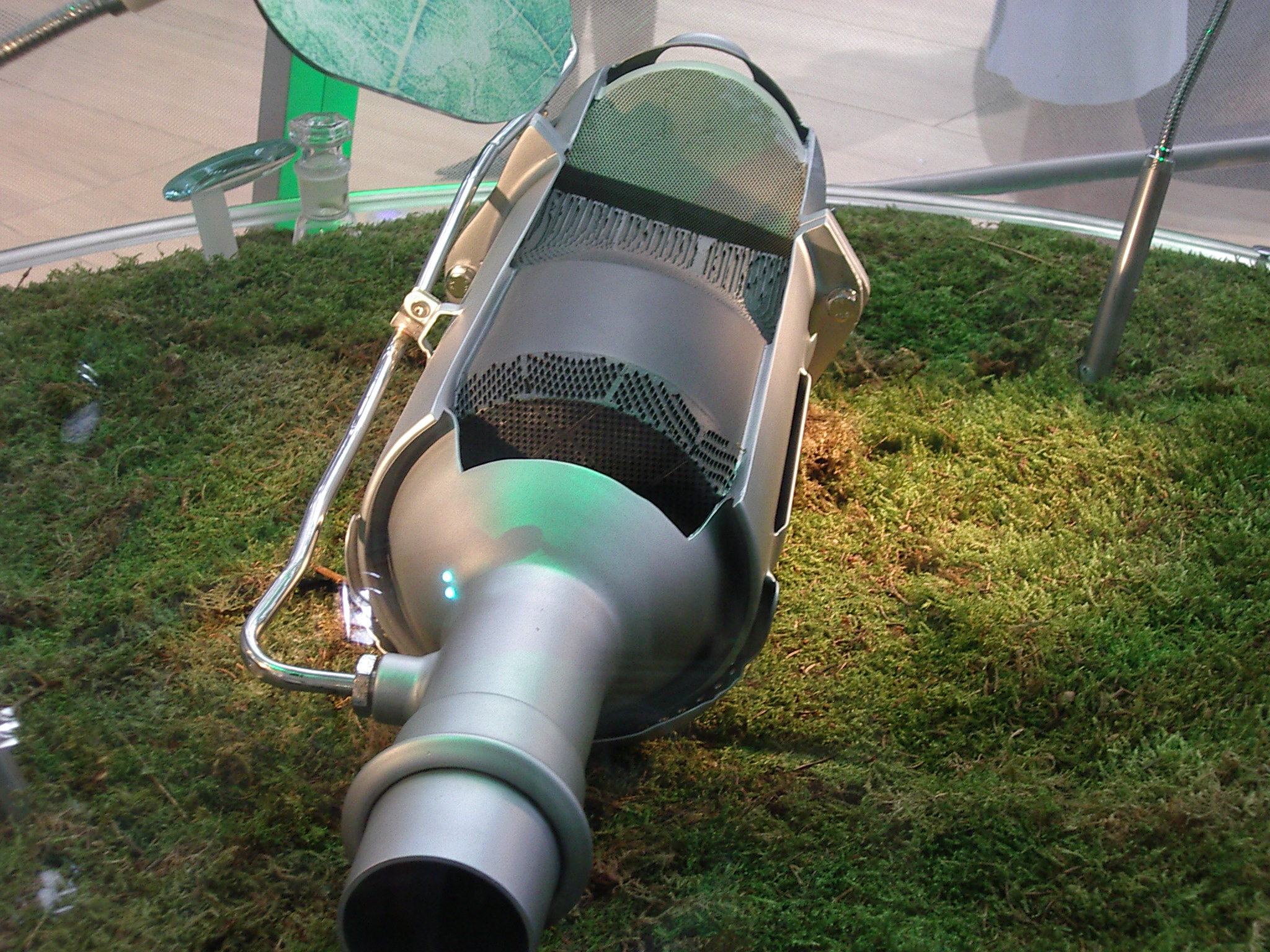
First generation Peugeot DPF manufactured by Ibiden

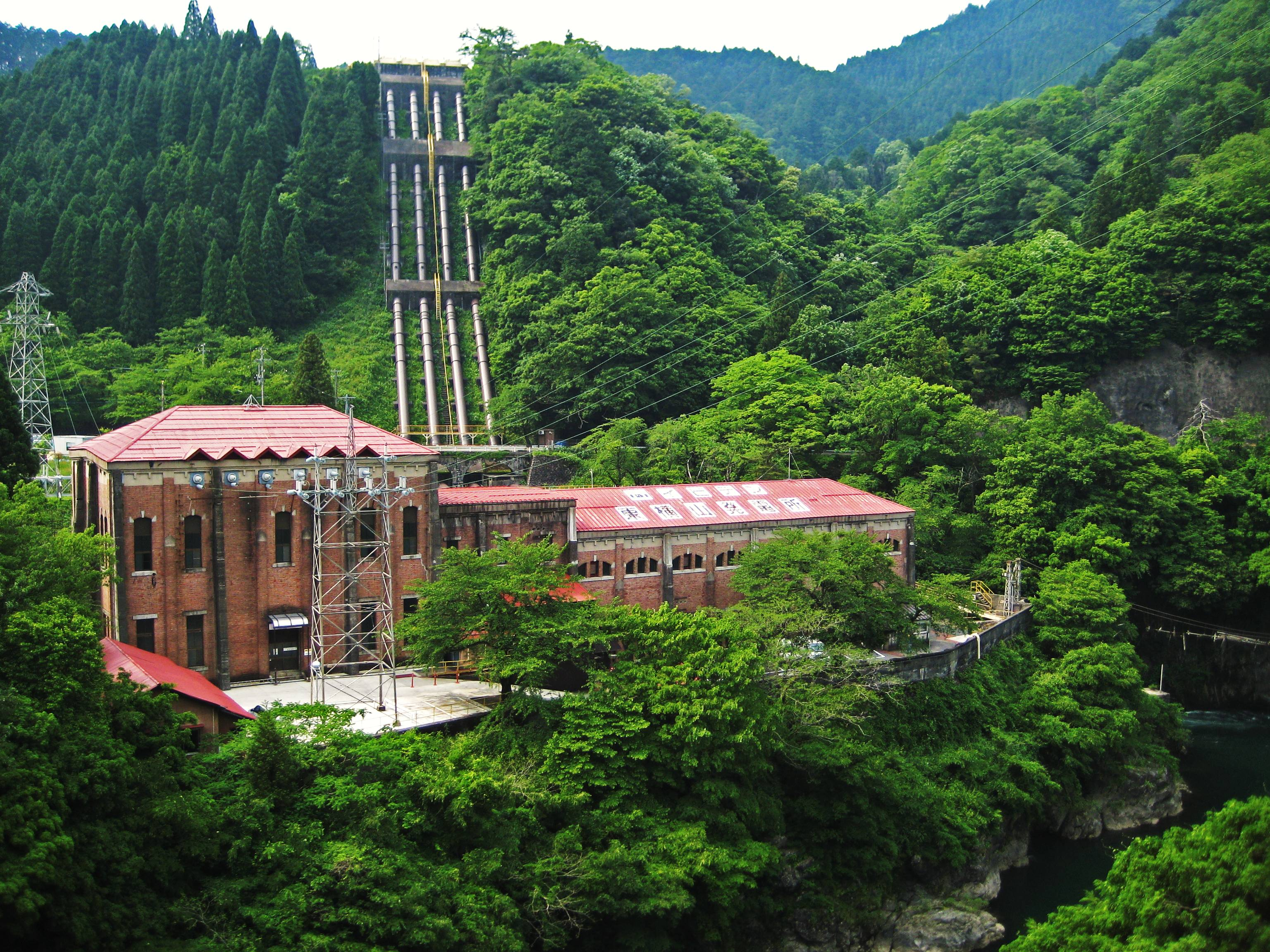
The company's Higashi-Yokoyama power plant

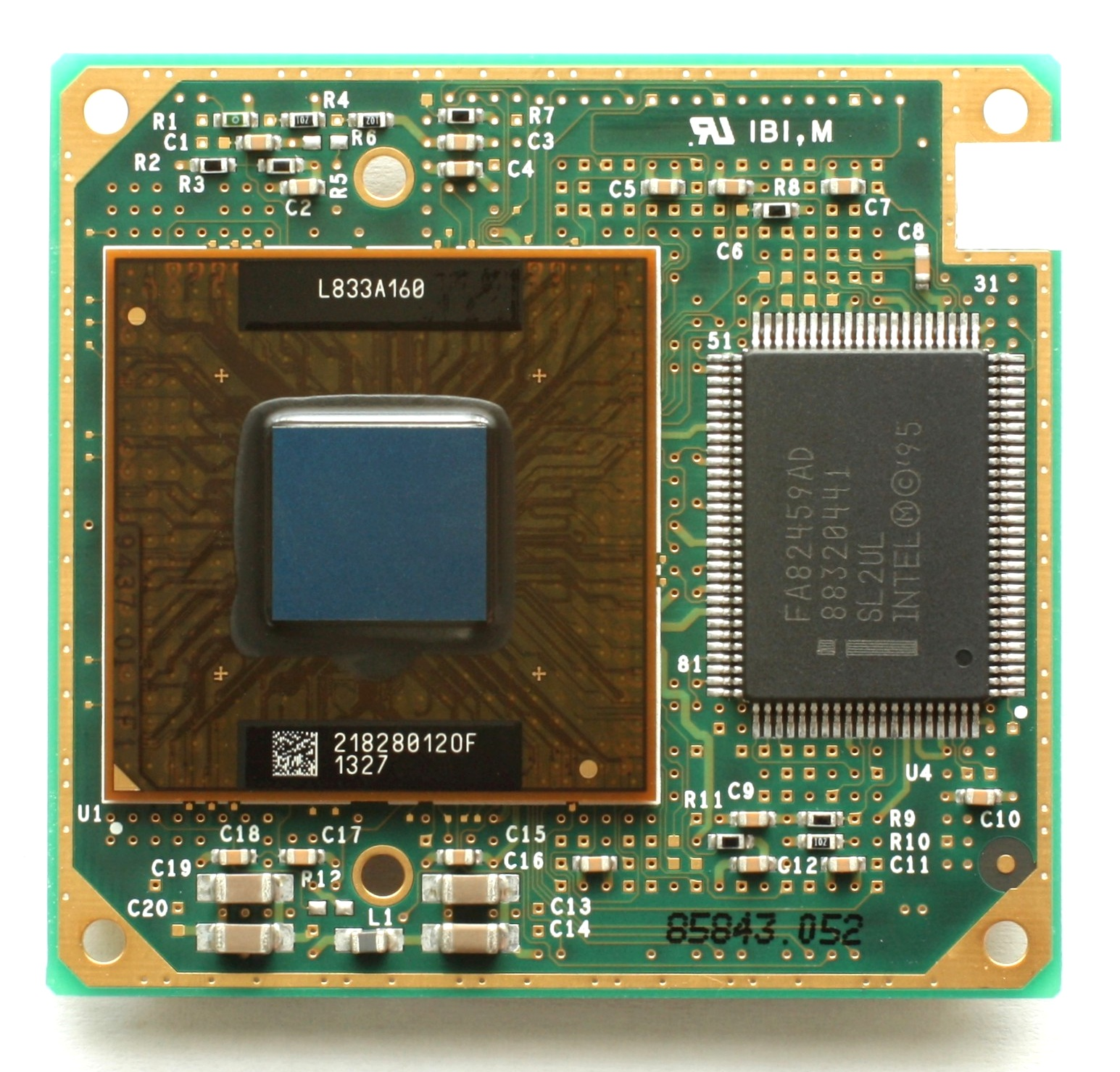
Intel Pentium II Tonga CPU on an Ibiden printed wiring board
