= Motosu, Gifu (town) =

Dissolved municipality in Gifu prefecture, Japan

Motosu (本巣町, Motosu-chō) was a town located in Motosu District, Gifu Prefecture, Japan.

On, February 1, 2004, Motosu absorbed the towns of Itonuki, Neo and Shinsei (all from Motosu District) to create the city of Motosu.
