= Ōgaki Domain =

Historical state

Ōgaki Domain 大垣藩
- Domain of Japan
- 1601–1871
- Capital: Ōgaki Castle
- Area
  - Coordinates: 35°21′43″N 136°36′58″E
  - Type: Daimyō
- Historical era: Edo period
  - Established: 1601
  - Disestablished: 1871
- Today part of: part of Gifu Prefecture

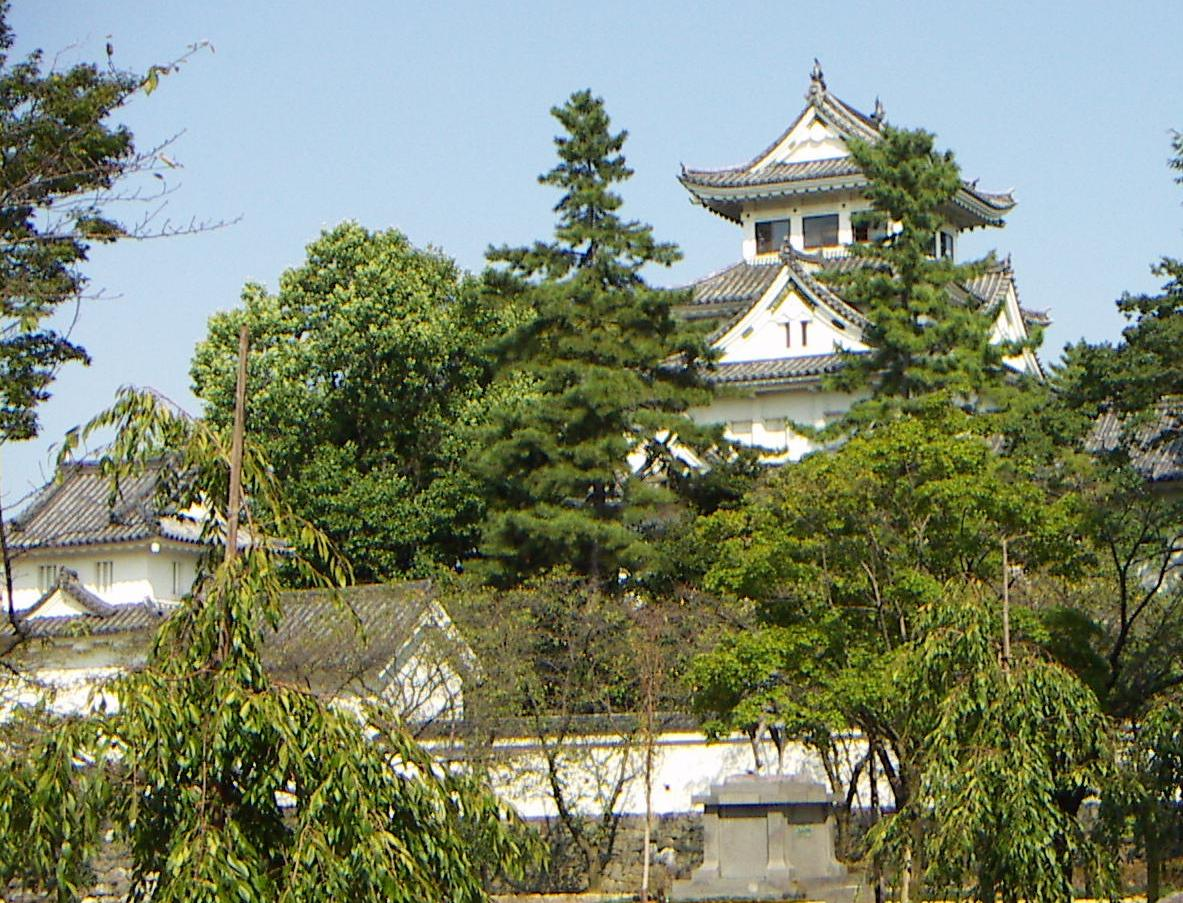
Ōgaki Castle

Ōgaki Domain (大垣藩, Ōgaki-han) was a fudai feudal domain under the Tokugawa shogunate of Edo period Japan. It was located in Mino Province, in the Tōkai region of central Honshu. The domain was centered at Ōgaki Castle, in what is now the city of Ōgaki in Gifu Prefecture. It was ruled for most of its existence by the Toda clan.

== History ==
Ōgaki is located at a strategic point on the road from Mino Province to Ōmi Province and Kyoto and was hotly contested in the Sengoku period between Saitō Dōsan and Oda Nobuhide. Under Oda Nobunaga, Ujiie Naotomo followed by his son Ujiie Naomasa ruled the area. Under Toyotomi Hideyoshi, the area was entrusted to Ikeda Tsuneoki, Toyotomi Hidetsugu, Toyotomi Hidenaga, Katō Mitsuyasu, Hitotsuyanagi Naosuke, Toyotomi Hidekatsu and finally to Itō Morimasa. In 1600, Itō Morimasa was daimyō of a 30,000 koku domain, which was a problem for Tokugawa Ieyasu since Itō was a staunch supporter of Ishida Mitsunari and Ōgaki was a very short distance from Sekigahara. However, Itō also proved to be an inept commander and failed to attack the Tokugawa armies when they were the most vulnerable, and as a result was dispossessed after the Battle of Sekigahara.

In 1601, Tokugawa Ieyasu established Ōgaki Domain, installing Ishikawa Yasumichi as daimyō with a kokudaka of 50,000 koku. The Ishikawa clan were transferred to Hita Domain in Bungo Province in 1616 as a reward for their services at the Battle of Osaka. They were replaced by a cadet branch of the Hisamatsu-Matsudaira from 1616 to 1624, followed by the Okabe clan from 1624 to 1633, and then by another cadet branch of the Hisamatsu-Matsudaira from 1633 to 1635.

In 1635, Toda Ujikane was transferred to Ōgaki from Amagasaki Domain in Settsu Province, and the kokudaka of the domain was increased to 100,000 koku. The Toda clan would continue to rule Ōgaki until the Meiji restoration.

Toda Ujikane was instrumental in opening new rice fields, irrigation and flood control measures, planting of forests and reforming the remuneration system for his retainers. He also maintained Ōgaki Castle. under the 3rd daimyō , Toda Ujisada, 3000 koku of new rice fields were given to his brother, Toda Ujishige, which when combined with the 7000 koku already under his name, placed him over the threshold to become daimyō of a cadet domain, the Ōgaki Shinden Domain. This sub-domain would also endure to the Meiji restoration. The 6th daimyō, Toda Ujihide, attempted to implement fiscal reforms, which failed due to a peasant's revolt in 1766. The 7th daimyō, Toda Ujinori, served as a rōjū under Tokugawa Ienari during a time of increasing Russian incursions into Japanese northern waters. The 8th daimyō, Toda Ujitsune, founded the han school, "Chidokan" in 1840. The 9th daimyō, Toda Ujimasa reformed the domain's military in 1856. The 10th daimyō, Toda Ujiakira attempted further reforms, but was frustrated by the Ansei Purge. The final daimyō, Toda Ujitaka was branded an "enemy of the crown" after the Battle of Toba-Fushimi in the Boshin War, but was able to defect to the imperial side and served as messenger of the court to other domains along the Tōsandō to urge them to submit. He was later awarded a 30,000 koku increase by the Meiji government, but soon afterwards Ōgaki Domain became Ōgaki Prefecture due to the abolition of the han system, and was then absorbed into the new Gifu Prefecture.

== Bakumatsu period holdings ==
As with most domains in the han system, Ōgaki Domain consisted of several discontinuous territories calculated to provide the assigned kokudaka, based on periodic cadastral surveys and projected agricultural yields.

- Mino Province
  - 12 villages in Ishizu District
  - 24 villages in Tagi District
  - 10 villages in Fuwa District
  - 90 villages in Anpachi District
  - 53 villages in Ikeda District
  - 45 villages in Ōno District
  - 31 villages in Motosu District
  - 2 villages in Katagata District

== List of daimyō ==
#	Name	Tenure	Courtesy title	Court Rank	kokudaka
Ishikawa clan (fudai) 1600 - 1616
1	Ishikawa Yasumichi (石川康通)	1560 - 1607	Nagato-no-kami (長門守)	Lower 5th (従五位下)	50,000 koku
2	Ishikawa Ienari (石川家成)	1607 - 1609	Hyuga-no-kami (日向守)	Lower 5th (従五位下)	50,000 koku
3	Ishikawa Tadafua (石川忠総)	1609 - 1616	Tonomo-no-kami (主殿頭)	Lower 5th (従五位下)	50,000 koku
Hisamatsu-Matsudaira (shinpan) 1616 - 1624
1	Matsudaira Tadayoshi (松平忠良)	1612 - 1624	Kai-no-kami (甲斐守)	Lower 5th (従五位下)	20,000 koku
2	Matsudaira Norinaga (松平憲良)	1624 - 1624	Inaba-no-kami (因幡守)	Lower 5th (従五位下)	20,000 koku
Okabe clan (fudai) 1624 - 1633
1	Okabe Nagamori (岡部長盛)	1624 - 1632	Naizen-no-kami (内膳正)	Lower 5th (従五位下)	50,000 koku
2	Okabe Nobukatsu (岡部宣勝)	1632 - 1633	Mino-no-kami (美濃守)	Lower 5th (従五位下)	50,000 koku
Ogyū-Matsudaira clan (shinpan) 1633 - 1635
1	Matsudaira Sadatsuna (松平定綱)	1633 - 1635	Etchu-no-kami (越中守)	Lower 4th (従四位下)	60,000 koku
Toda clan (fudai) 1635 -1871
1	Toda Ujikane (戸田氏鉄)	1635 - 1651	Uneme-no-kami (采女正)	Lower 4th (従四位下)	100,000 koku
2	Toda Ujinobu (戸田氏信)	1651 - 1671	Uneme-no-kami (采女正)	Lower 4th (従四位下)	100,000 koku
3	Toda Ujiaki (戸田氏西)	1671 - 1684	Tajima-no-kami (但馬守)	Lower 4th (従四位下)	100,000 koku
4	Toda Ujisada (戸田氏定)	1684 -1723	Uneme-no-kami (采女正)	Lower 5th (従五位下)	100,000 koku
5	Toda Ujinaga (戸田氏長)	1723 - 1735	Ise-no-kami (伊勢守)	Lower 4th (従四位下)	100,000 koku
6	Toda Ujihide (戸田氏英)	1735 - 1768	Uneme-no-kami (采女正)	Lower 5th (従五位下)	100,000 koku
7	Toda Ujinori (戸田氏教)	1768 - 1806	Uneme-no-kami (采女正)	Lower 5th (従五位下)	100,000 koku
8	Toda Ujitsune (戸田氏庸)	1806 - 1841	Uneme-no-kami (采女正)	Lower 5th (従五位下)	100,000 koku
9	Toda Ujimasa (戸田氏正)	1841 - 1858	Uneme-no-kami (采女正)	3rd ( 従三位)	100,000 koku
10	Toda Ujiakira (戸田氏彬)	1858 - 1865	Uneme-no-kami (采女正)	Lower 4th (従四位下)	100,000 koku
11	Toda Ujitaka (戸田氏共)	1865 -1871	Uneme-no-kami (采女正), Jiju (侍従)	Lower 4th (従四位下)	100,000 koku

== See also ==
- List of Han
