= Solar Ark =

Coordinates: 35.330941°N 136.671186°E

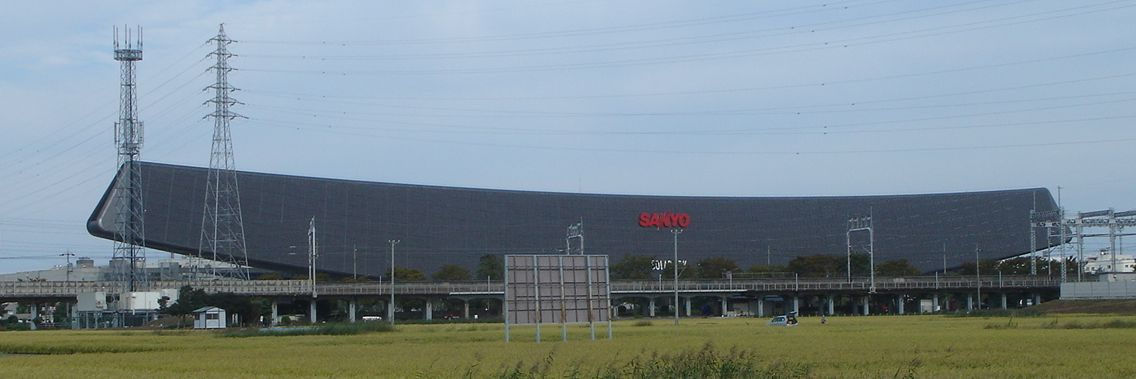
- The Solar Ark inside Sanyo Electric Co., Ltd. Gifu Plant
- Established: 1 April 2002
- Location: 180 Ohmori, Anpachi, Gifu, 503-0195 Japan
- Type: Science museum
- Public transit access: JR Gifu-Hashima Station
- Website: Solar Ark

The Solar Ark (ソーラーアーク, Sōrā Āku) is a Japanese arc-shaped solar photovoltaic power generation facility located in Anpachi, Gifu Prefecture The facility is 315 meters (1,033 ft) wide and 37 meters (121 ft) tall, one of the largest solar buildings in the world, and is located in the geographical center of Japan. It can be seen from the Tōkaidō Shinkansen, which runs past on an adjacent railway. During its years of operation between 2002 and 2022, over 5000 panels produced approximately 530,000 kilowatt-hours of energy annually, with a maximum system power of 630 kilowatts. The company described it as an "ambassador for environmentally responsible energy".

The Solar Ark was an enterprise partner with the 2005 World Exhibition, Aichi Prefecture, Japan, and featured an hands-on, outdoor light exhibition as part of the Expo. A a museum of solar energy, called the Solar Lab, was previously located at the center of the Solar Ark.

In July 2026, it was announced that the Solar Ark would be dismantled starting in September, with demolition taking approximately one year.

== History ==
The Solar Ark was constructed by Sanyo Electric Co. Initially, the company had intended to create the largest photovoltaic system in the world, with a 3.4 megawatt output, to mark the organisation's 50th anniversary. By 1998, designers had already been in discussions about the Solar Ark's appearance. Sanyo had planned on using cutting edge solar technology available to them at the time, using a combination of crystal silicon and thin-film amorphous silicon with 14-15% efficiency. During the initial planning, Sanyo had to recall several monocrystalline cells, which were the predecessors of the hybrid technology mentioned before, due to insufficient output.

Construction was completed in December 2001.

Panasonic acquired Sanyo, and as part of its corporate restructuring and re-branding strategy, the red Sanyo logo on the Solar Ark was replaced with a blue Panasonic logo in August 2011.

In 2022, solar energy generation ended at the site, and all corporate logos were removed. Panasonic sold the land to an Osaka real estate developer, and media reports initially indicated that the building would be demolished. In December 2024, the real estate developer sold the northern half of the site (60% of the total land) to real estate developer UI JAPAN, announced the building would not be demolished, and instead would explore other ways to utilize the site.

However, it has been decided that a large logistics warehouse is to be built on the site, so it is intended that it will be demolished over a period of about a year starting in September 2026.

== Design ==
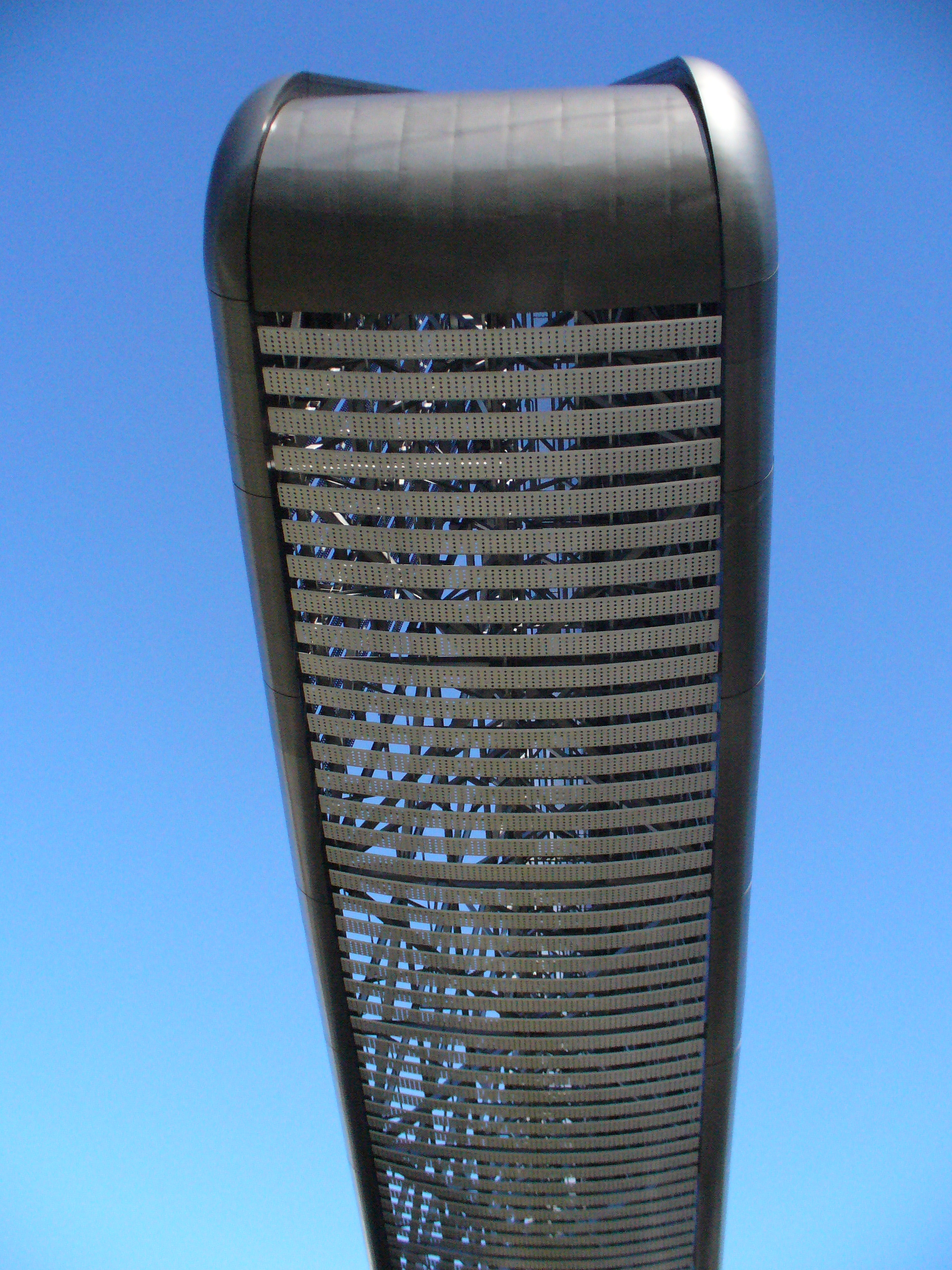
The Solar Ark viewed from below

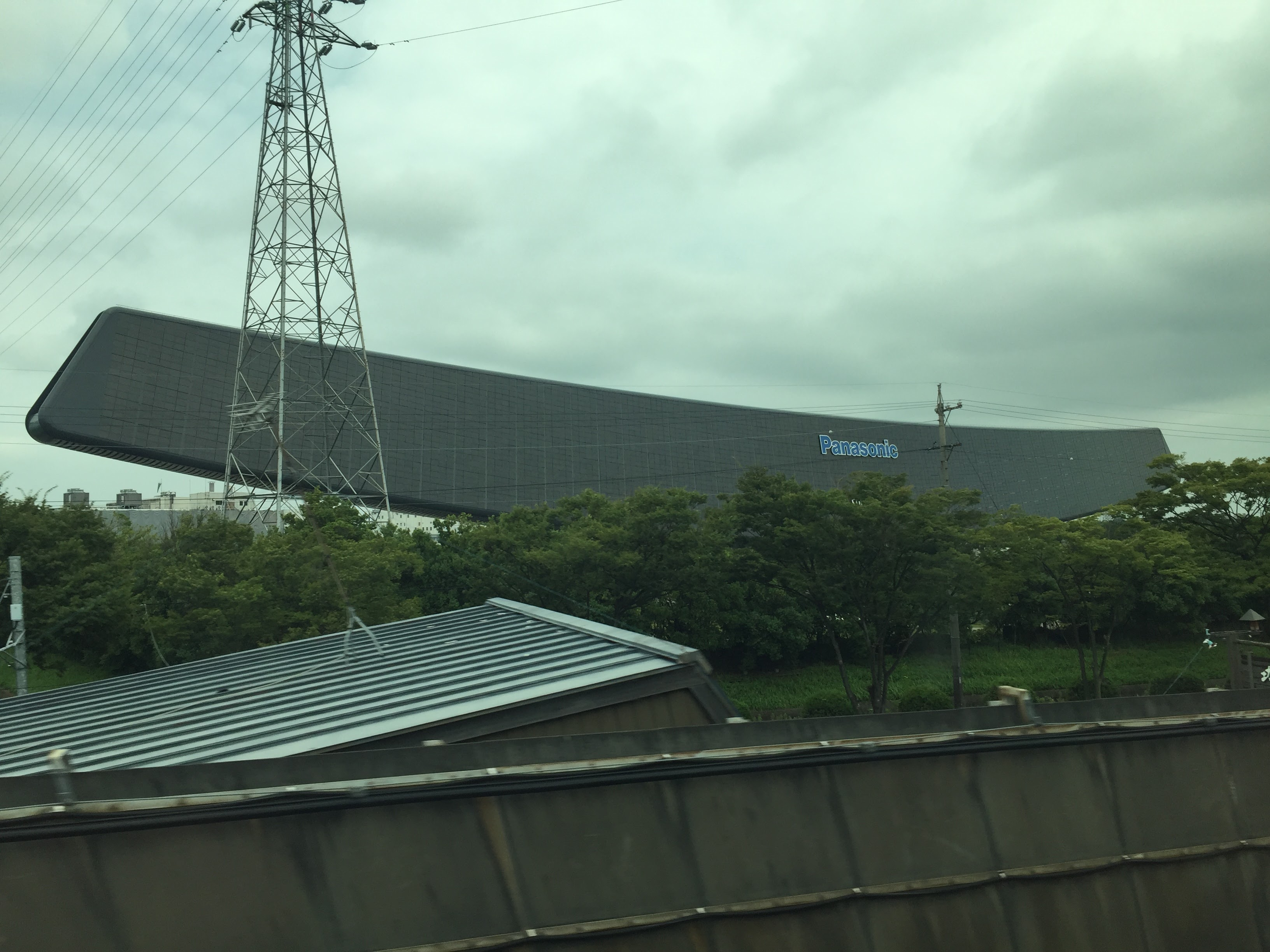
Panasonic Solar Ark

The Solar Ark's design was inspired by the vision of an ark embarking on a journey to the 21st century. This idea led to the Solar Ark's size and overall symbolic shape of being an example of producing clean energy. In total, the construction area for the Solar Ark is 3294.48 m^{2} reinforced concrete was used for the base of the construction. From one end to the other, the total length of the Solar Ark is 315 metres. The ark is 31.6 metres tall from the centre of the structure. There are 5,046 solar panels in total. Twelve single-crystal silicon solar cell modules per unit were assembled on the ground, and 470 units were lifted up and attached to the main body of the Solar Ark.

The weight of the actual body of the ark (pillars being excluded) is 3,000 metric tonnes and is constructed from structural steel. This construction material helps give the impression of the solar ark being suspended in the air. Each column is 2 metres in diameter and 31 meters in length and the Solar Ark is 315 metres long. The entire Solar Ark chassis is supported by four “G-Columns” which are custom built pillars by Kubota and in total, these pillars weigh approximately 5,000 tonnes. These high-quality pillars are homogeneous, the result of the seamless method of construction that utilizes centrifugal force. Due to the Solar Ark's sturdy building materials, the Ark is able to resist winds of up to 34 meters/second and level 7 earthquakes on the Japanese scale.

The ark is surrounded by 5-meter high water fountains and two ponds, each having their own cascade. The entrance to the Solar Ark has solar wings which are composed of HIT solar cells that generate electricity on the topside and underside while also functioning as awnings that allow sunlight to filter through. Between the individual solar panels, there are, in total, 75,000 red, green, and blue computer controlled LEDs which are activated at night to produce images and words across the ark.

== Museum ==
The Solar Energy Museum, also called the Solar Lab, was formerly a museum and exhibition center located at the site, in a structurally separate building, that provided information about solar energy. There were several exhibitions, workshops, and science classes held at the Solar Lab, primarily aimed at youth to help educate about the workings and importance of photovoltaic science. The Solar Lab was divided into ten zones that provided a wide range of activities for visitors. Activities included a solar system simulator, an adventure wall, an artistic approach to the sun, a solar library, and a control deck where visitors could view real-time data related to the power being generated by the Solar Ark.

== Awards ==
The Solar Ark received several awards and notable achievements during its operation:

- Good Design Award 2002 Architecture and Environment Design/Architecture Design
- The 5th "Renewing Your Hometown" 21st Century Fine Art Awards (Honorable Mention)
- The 12th "Facilities that Publicize Energy" Award (Exhibition Category)
- The 12th Advertising Contest on the Environment, Grand Prix of Environment Advertising Award (Presented by State Minister for the Environment)
- The 2nd Environment and Facility Prize, Outstanding Performance Award (Environmental Design Category)
- Energy Publicity Center Award for PR Activity, the 14th Director-General of the Natural Energy Agency Award, 2004
