= Kamiishizu, Gifu =

Dissolved municipality in Gifu prefecture, Japan

Map of Kamiishizu, Gifu

Kamiishizu (上石津町, Kamiishizu-chō) was a town located in Yōrō District, Gifu Prefecture, Japan.

As of 2003, the town had an estimated population of 6,660 and a density of 53.98 persons per km^{2}. The total area was 123.38 km^{2}.

On March 27, 2006, Kamiishizu, along with the town of Sunomata (from Anpachi District), was merged into the expanded city of Ōgaki.

The Township was founded on April 1, 1969.

== Geography ==
Located on the southwest end of Gifu Prefecture, Kamiishizu is a basin area bounded by the Suzuka mountain range to the west, the Yoro mountain range to the east, and Nangu mountain and 800-meter-high hills to the north.

- 88% of the town area is covered by forest.
- There are 4 villages that comprise the town of Kamiishizu: Makida, Ichinose, Tara and Toki.
- River systems - Makida River
- Tara Gorge - A sightseeing and recreation corridor on the Makida River.

== Attractions ==
- Senju Botan-en - an extensive mountain-side peony garden, displaying over 2000 varieties, as well as other flower specimens, such as rhododendrons, hydrangeas, dogwoods, and more.
- The Residence of Nishitakagi - Residence of three families of the Takagi family during the Tokugawa shogunate. They occupied this residence from the time of the Battle of Sekigahara til the last days of the Shogunate. The samurai retainers of the shogunate were appointed commissioners of riparian work on the Kisogawa river system, and carried out the Horeki flood control project.
- Showa Music Village (Showa Ongaku-mura) - A museum of popular music from the Showa Era, and memorial to Eguchi Yoshi, a famous composer of that time. Other facilities at this site include the FN Music Hall, where hundreds of folk music album covers are displayed; Arpeggio Italian restaurant; and Lake Suirei, a man-made reservoir that is also a bird-watching and recreation destination.

== Products ==
- Yoro Kobushi Clay is used in the production of Yoro-yaki pottery. It is valued for its high plasticity.
- Wasabizuke - Wasabi is grown in the very clean waters that stream from the Okuyoro Mountains. It is then preserved in sake lees and used as a flavoring for rice.
