= Yasufumi Tanahashi =

Japanese politician

- 棚橋 泰文
- Official portrait, 2021

Chairman of the National Public Safety Commission
- In office 25 July 2021 – 4 October 2021
- Prime Minister: Yoshihide Suga
- Preceded by: Hachiro Okonogi
- Succeeded by: Satoshi Ninoyu

Member of the House of Representatives
- Incumbent
- Assumed office 21 October 1996
- Preceded by: Constituency established
- Constituency: Gifu 2nd

Personal details
- Born: 11 February 1963 (age 63) Ōgaki, Gifu, Japan
- Party: Liberal Democratic
- Education: University of Tokyo
- Occupation: Politician, Lawyer

Yasufumi Tanahashi (棚橋 泰文, Tanahashi Yasufumi; born 11 February 1963), is a Japanese politician who served as the Chairman of the National Public Safety Commission.

== Early life ==
He graduated from the University of Tokyo with a B.A. in private law in March 1987.

== Career ==
Tanahashi has been a member of the House of Representatives representing Gifu's 2nd district since 1996.

He served as the Chairman of the National Public Safety Commission from July to October, 2021.

He also served as Minister of State in Charge of Science and Technology Policy in Prime Minister Junichiro Koizumi's cabinet.
