= Anpachi =

Anpachi 安八町
- Town
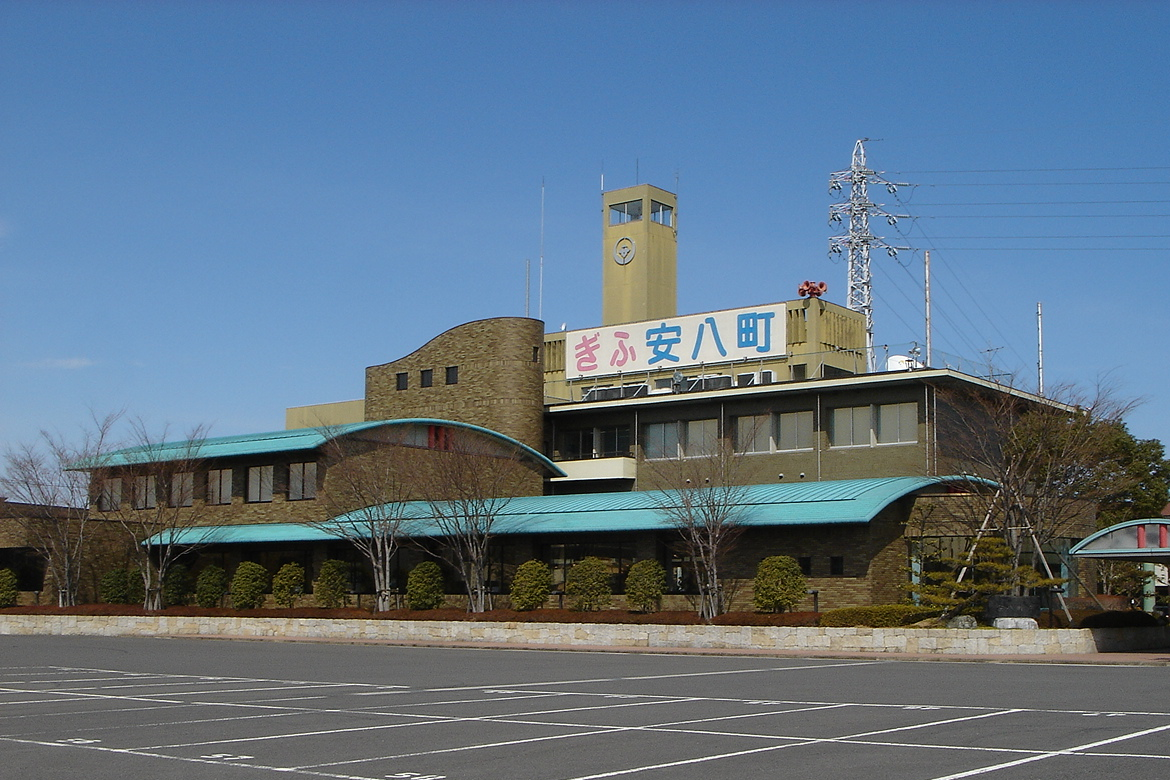
- Anpachi Town Hall

- Flag Seal

- Location of Anpachi in Gifu Prefecture

- Coordinates: 35°20′7.2″N 136°39′55.4″E
- Country: Japan
- Region: Chūbu
- Prefecture: Gifu
- District: Anpachi

Area
  - Total: 18.19 km^{2} (7.02 sq mi)

Population (December 1, 2018)
  - Total: 15,072
  - Density: 828.6/km^{2} (2,146/sq mi)
- Time zone: UTC+9 (Japan Standard Time)
- City symbols
- Tree: Mignonette
- Flower: Narcissus
- Phone number: 0584-64-3111
- Address: Kōritori 161, Anpachi-chō, Anpachi-gun, Gifu-ken 503-0198
- Website: Official website

Anpachi (安八町, Anpachi-chō) is a town located in Gifu, Japan. As of 1 December 2018, the town had an estimated population of 15,072 in 5,291 households, and a population density of 830 persons per km^{2}. The total area of the town was 18.16 square kilometres (7.01 sq mi).

== Geography ==
Anpachi is located in the northwestern portion of the Nōbi Plain in southwestern Gifu Prefecture. The Ibi River and the Nagara River flow through the town. The town is located in marshy flatlands and was often subject to flooding. The oldest portions of the town are protected by ancient embankments. The town has a climate characterized by hot and humid summers, and mild winters (Köppen climate classification Cfa). The average annual temperature in Anpachi is 15.4 °C. The average annual rainfall is 1877 mm with September as the wettest month. The temperatures are highest on average in August, at around 27.7 °C, and lowest in January, at around 4.1 °C.

=== Neighbouring municipalities ===
- Gifu Prefecture
  - Hashima
  - Mizuho
  - Ōgaki

== Demographics ==
Per Japanese census data, the population of Ampachi has remained relatively steady over the past 50 years.

Historical population
Year	Pop.	±%
1970	12,354	—
1980	13,901	+12.5%
1990	15,085	+8.5%
2000	15,078	−0.0%
2010	15,271	+1.3%
2020	14,355	−6.0%

== History ==
The area around Anpachi was part of traditional Mino Province, and the name of "Anpachi" appears in Nara period records, including the Nihon Shoki. During the Edo period, it was mostly controlled by Ōgaki Domain. During the post-Meiji restoration cadastral reforms, the area was organised into Anpachi District, Gifu. In 1955, the three villages of Musubu, Namori and Maki merged to form the village of Apache. On April 1, 1960, Anpachi gained town status.

== Economy ==
The mainstay of the local economy is agriculture (rice, vegetables, dairy, poultry), and light industry (computer related products, dairy products, chemicals).

== Education ==
Anpachi has three public elementary schools and two public middle schools operated by the town government. The town does not have a high school.

== Transportation ==
=== Railway ===
- The town has no passenger railway service.

=== Highway ===
- Meishin Expressway
- National Route 21

== Local attractions ==
- The Solar Ark, an over 300m long photovoltaic power generation facility is located in the town.

== Sister city relations ==
Domestic

- Fukui, Fukui, Japan, friendship city

International

- Crowsnest Pass, Alberta, Canada, friendship city

== Notable people from Anpachi ==
- Arashiyama Jirō – silver medalist in Judo during 2004 Summer Olympics
