= Kozō Andō =

- Born: June 20, 1940; Ōgaki, Gifu
- Died: October 8, 2003 (aged 63); Japan

Kozō Andō (安藤 宏三, Andō Kozō; 1940–2003) was a teacher of kendo.

Andō was born in Ōgaki, Gifu on June 20, 1940, and began practising kendo at the age of 13 as a student when living in Yokkaichi. He eventually became captain of his university's team and advanced to 7th dan at age 27. Throughout his life, he remained shihan (senior teacher) at his university. He was also involved in kendo as a member of several bodies of the All-Japanese Kendo Federation (ZNKR) and the All-Japanese Student Kendo Federation (ZNGKR).

Andō authored several publications on kendo, one of which is still recognized as a standard textbook for German-language practitioners of the sport. He acted as a national trainer in Germany for years and committed himself to the development of kendo there and in several other European countries such as the Baltic states. He was recognized as a shihan of a Hamburg-based dojo which is holding annual seminars to his remembrance.

In 2003, Andō suffered a stroke during a flight back to Japan and died on October 8.
