= Kitagata, Gifu =

Kitagata 北方町
- Town
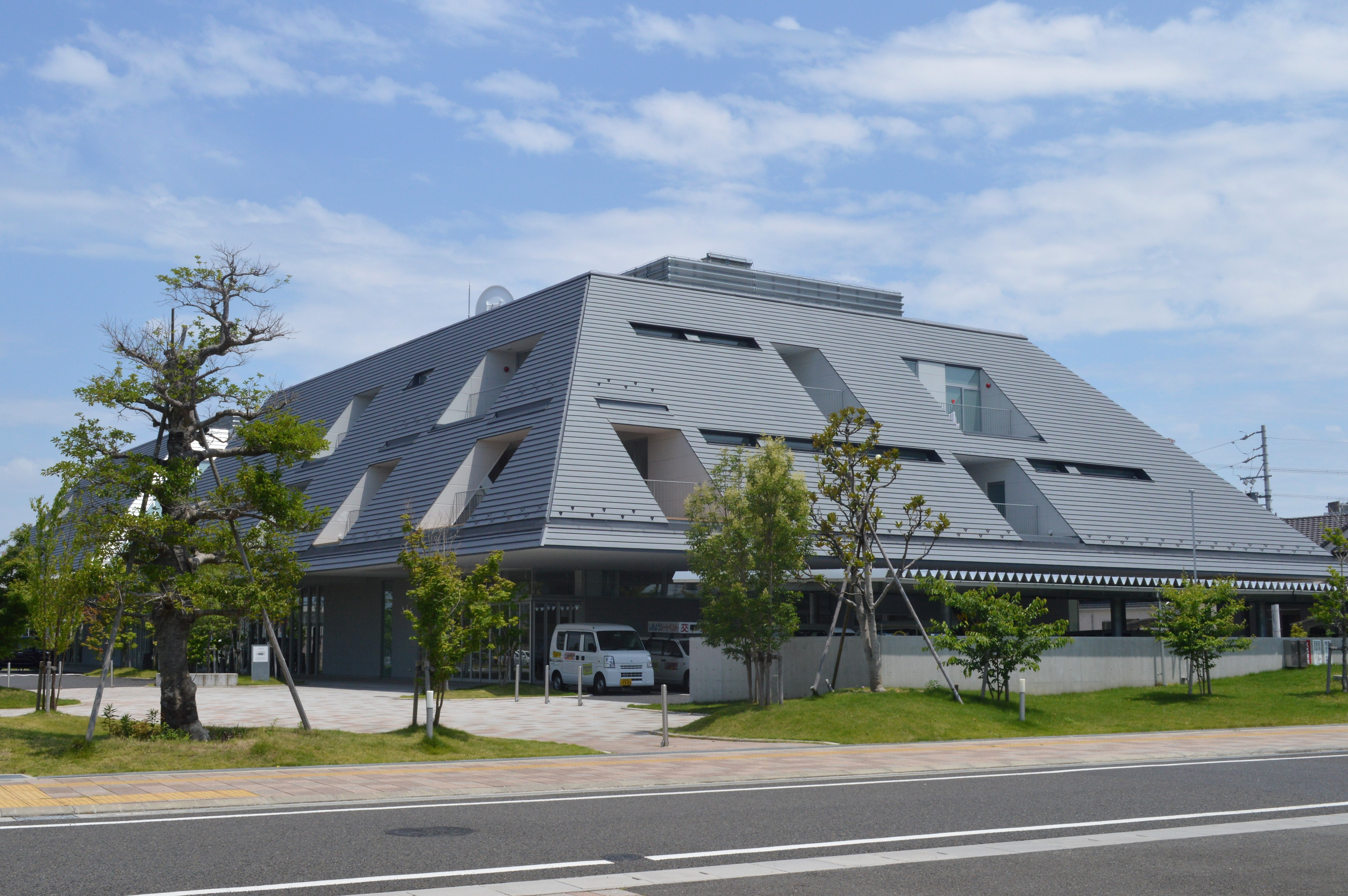
- Kitagata Town Hall

- Flag Seal

- Location of Kitagata in Gifu Prefecture

- Coordinates: 35°26′N 136°41′E
- Country: Japan
- Region: Chūbu
- Prefecture: Gifu
- District: Motosu

Government
  - Mayor: Hideo Muroto

Area
  - Total: 5.18 km^{2} (2.00 sq mi)

Population (November 1, 2018)
  - Total: 18,410
  - Density: 3,550/km^{2} (9,200/sq mi)
- Time zone: UTC+9 (Japan Standard Time)
- City symbols
- Tree: Ilex integra
- Flower: Narcissus
- Bird: Common kingfisher
- Phone number: 058-323-1111
- Address: Kitagata 1323-5, Kitagata-chō, Motosu-gun, Gifu-ken 501-0492
- Website: Official website (in Japanese)

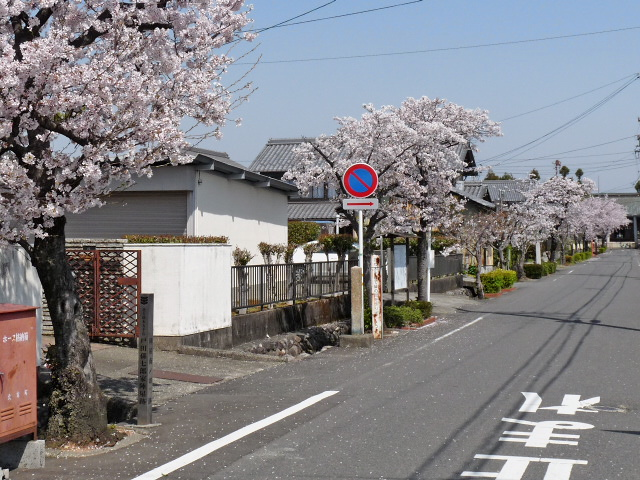
Site of Kitagata Jin'ya

Kitagata (北方町, Kitagata-chō) is a town located in Motosu District, Gifu Prefecture, Japan. As of 1 November 2018, the town had an estimated population of 18,410 and a population density of 3600 persons per km^{2}, in 7,449 households. The total area of the town was 5.18 square kilometres (2.00 sq mi). It is the smallest town in Gifu Prefecture in terms of area.

== Geography ==
Kitagata is located in the Nōbi Plain in southern Gifu Prefecture. The town has a climate characterized by characterized by hot and humid summers, and mild winters (Köppen climate classification Cfa). The average annual temperature in Kitagata is 15.3 °C. The average annual rainfall is 1990 mm with September as the wettest month. The temperatures are highest on average in August, at around 27.9 °C, and lowest in January, at around 3.9 °C.

=== Neighbouring municipalities ===
- Gifu Prefecture
  - Gifu
  - Mizuho
  - Motosu

== Demographics ==
Per Japanese census data, the population of Kitagata has recently plateaued after decades of strong growth.

Historical population
Year	Pop.	±%
1970	10,855	—
1980	13,165	+21.3%
1990	15,955	+21.2%
2000	17,250	+8.1%
2010	18,395	+6.6%
2020	18,139	−1.4%

== History ==
The area around Kitagawa was part of traditional Mino Province. During the Edo period, it was part of the holdings of Kanō Domain, under by the Tokugawa shogunate. During the post-Meiji restoration cadastral reforms, the area was organised into Motosu District, Gifu Prefecture. The town of Kitagata was formed in 1889 with the establishment of the modern municipalities system. The town was severely damaged by the 1891 Mino–Owari earthquake, which destroyed 602 homes and killed 62 inhabitants.

== Education ==
Kitagata has three public elementary schools and one public middle school operated by the town government. The town has one public high school operated by the Gifu Prefectural Board of Education.

== Transportation ==
=== Railway ===
- Kitagata does not have any passenger railway service.

=== Highway ===
- National Route 157
