= Institute of Advanced Media Arts and Sciences =

Coordinates: 35.385916°N 136.621121°E

- 情報科学芸術大学院大学
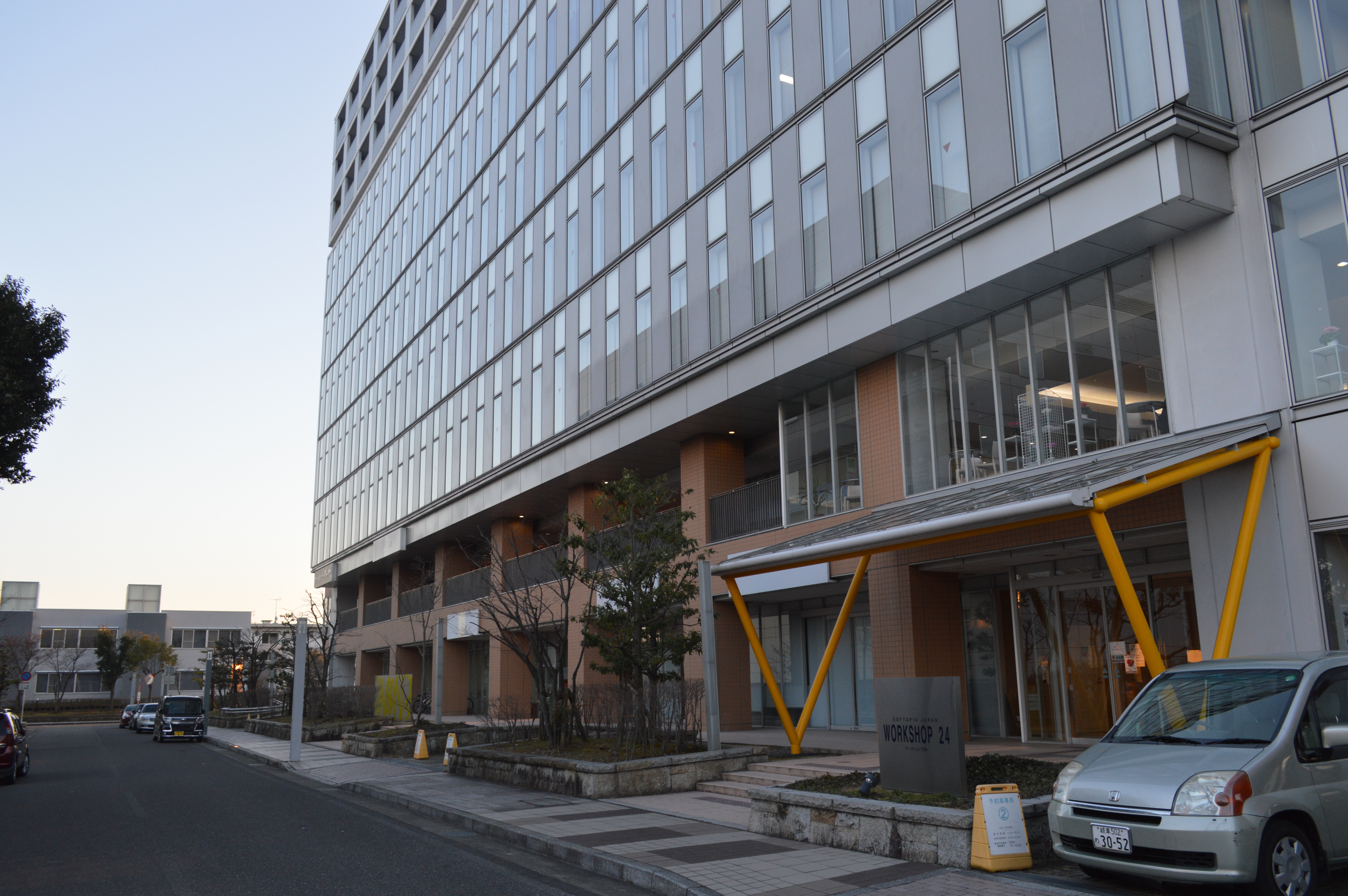
- Institute of Advanced Media Arts and Sciences
- Type: Public
- Established: 2001
- Location: Ōgaki, Gifu, Japan
- Website: https://www.iamas.ac.jp/en/

Institute of Advanced Media Arts and Sciences (情報科学芸術大学院大学, Jōhō kagaku geijutsu daigakuin daigaku), IAMAS is a public university at Ōgaki, Gifu, Japan, founded in 2001.
