= Motosu District =

District in Gifu prefecture, Japan

Coordinates: 35.4317°N 136.6908°E

Location of Motosu District in Gifu Prefecture

Motosu District (本巣郡, Motosu-gun) is a district located in Gifu Prefecture, Japan.

As of July 2011 the district has an estimated population of 18,389. The total area is 5.17 km^{2}.

The district has only one town, Kitagata.

== District Timeline ==
- April 1, 1959-
  - The village of Shinsei gained town status.
  - The village of Sunan gained town status.
- As of 2003, the district comprises the former districts of Motosu, Mushiroda (席田郡), parts of Katagata (方県郡), and parts of Ōno (大野郡, not to be confused with Ōno District in Hida region)
- May 1, 2003-The towns of Sunami and Hozumi merged to form the new city of Mizuho.
- February 1, 2004-The towns of Itonuki, Motosu and Shinsei, and the village of Neo merged to become the new city of Motosu.
- The town of Kitagata was scheduled to merge with the city of Gifu but the deal was cancelled on August 31, 2004.
