= Yoshiyuki Ishihara =

Japanese baseball player

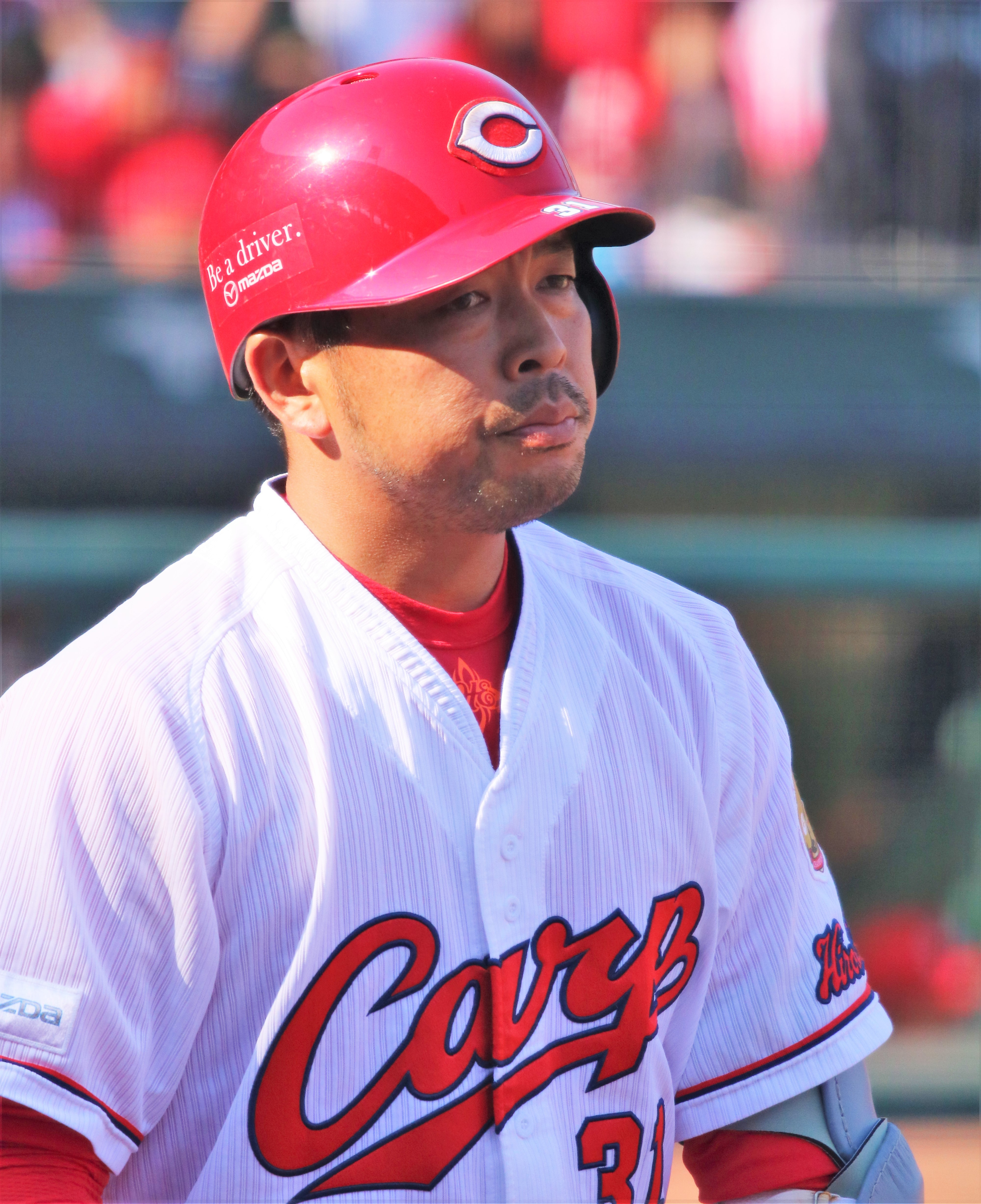
- Ishihara with the Hiroshima Toyo Carp

Hiroshima Toyo Carp – No. 81
- Catcher / Coach
- Born: September 7, 1979 (age 46); Gifu, Japan
- Batted: Right Threw: Right

NPB debut
- October 5, 2002, for the Hiroshima Toyo Carp

Last NPB appearance
- November 7, 2020, for the Hiroshima Toyo Carp

Career statistics (through 2020 season)
- Batting average: .236
- Home runs: 66
- Runs batted in: 378
- Stats at Baseball Reference

Teams
- As player: Hiroshima Toyo Carp (2002–2020); As coach: Hiroshima Toyo Carp (2023-present)
Medals
Men's baseball
Representing Japan
World Baseball Classic
Gold medal – first place	2009 Los Angeles	Team

Yoshiyuki Ishihara is a Japanese former professional baseball player. He has played in Nippon Professional Baseball (NPB) for the Hiroshima Toyo Carp.

== Career ==
Hiroshima Toyo Carp selected Ishihara with the forth selection in the 2001 NPB draft.

On October 5, 2002, Ishihara made his NPB debut.

On October 12, 2020, Ishihara announced his retirement after the season.
