= Yōrō District =

District in Gifu Prefecture, Japan

Coordinates: 35.2992°N 136.564°E

Location of Yōrō in Gifu Prefecture

Yōrō (養老郡, Yōrō-gun) is a district located in Gifu Prefecture, Japan.

As of September 2020, the district has an estimated population of 26,882. The total area is 72.29 km^{2}.

== Towns and villages ==
- Yōrō

== Merger ==
- On March 27, 2006, the town of Kamiishizu, along with the town of Sunomata from Anpachi District, merged into the city of Ōgaki.
