= Ōgaki =

Ōgaki 大垣市
- City
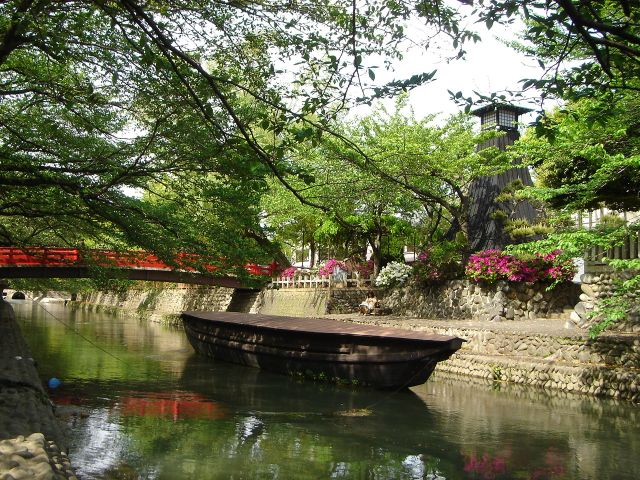
- Funamachi Port on the Suimon River

- Flag Seal

- ■ Location of Ōgaki in Gifu Prefecture

- Coordinates: 35°21′33.7″N 136°36′46.3″E
- Country: Japan
- Region: Chūbu
- Prefecture: Gifu

Government
  - Mayor: Hitoshi Ichida

Area
  - Total: 206.57 km^{2} (79.76 sq mi)

Population (December 31, 2018)
  - Total: 161,539
  - Density: 782.01/km^{2} (2,025.4/sq mi)
- Time zone: UTC+9 (Japan Standard Time)
- Phone number: 0584-81-4111
- Address: 2-29 Marunouchi, Ōgaki-shi, Gifu-ken 503-8601
- Climate: Cfa
- Website: Official website
- Symbols
- Flower: Satsuki azalea
- Tree: Cinnamomum camphora

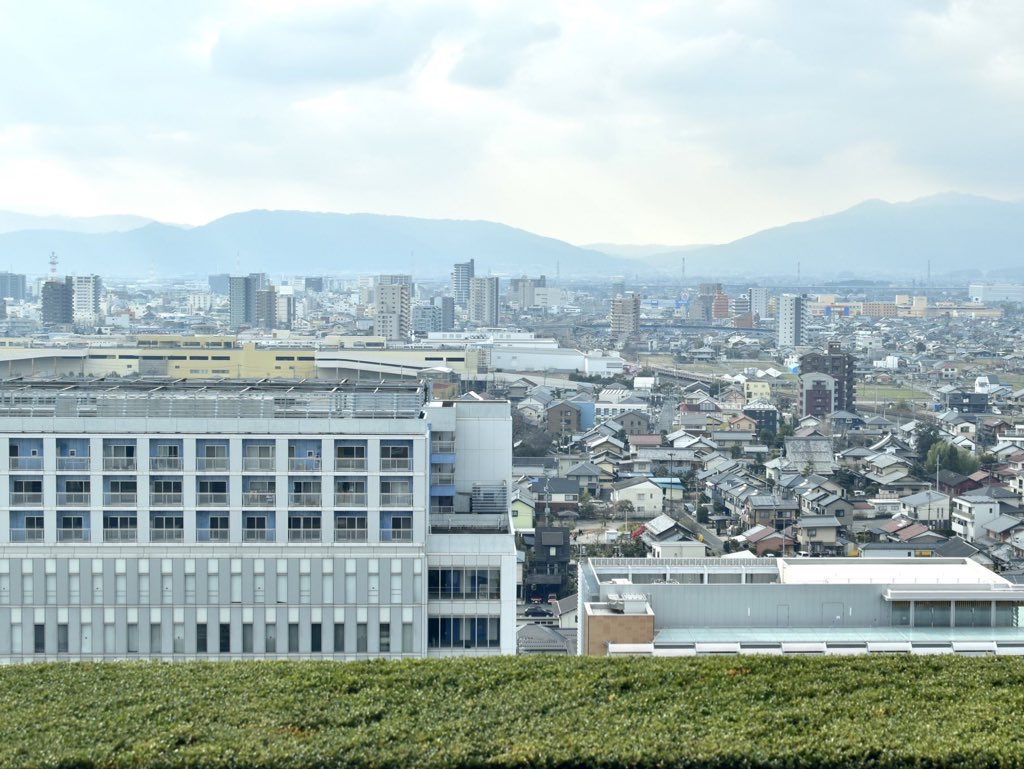
Skyline of Ōgaki City

Ōgaki (大垣市, Ōgaki-shi; Japanese pronunciation: [ò̞ó̞.ɡä́.k̟ʲí, -k̟ʲi̥.ɕì, -ŋä́-]) is a city located in Gifu, Japan. As of October 31, 2018, the city had an estimated population of 161,539, and a population density of 782 persons per km^{2} in 65,931 households. The total area of the city was 206.57 square kilometres (79.76 sq mi). Ōgaki was the final destination for the haiku poet Matsuo Bashō on one of his long journeys as recounted in his book Oku no Hosomichi. Every November the city holds a Bashō Festival.

== Geography ==
Ōgaki is located in the northwest area of the Nōbi Plain in Gifu Prefecture and is known as being the most centrally located city in Japan. As a result of its 2006 merger with the town of Kamiishizu (from Yōrō District), and the town of Sunomata (from Anpachi District), the city consists of three disconnected regions, with Sunomata in the east, the original Ōgaki in the center, and Kamiishizu in the southwest.

The main river flowing through the city is the Ibi River; however, the Nagara River forms the border between Ōgaki and the neighboring cities of Gifu and Hashima.

=== Neighbouring municipalities ===
- Gifu Prefecture
  - Anpachi
  - Gifu
  - Gōdo
  - Hashima
  - Ikeda
  - Mizuho
  - Sekigahara
  - Tarui
  - Wanouchi
  - Yōrō
- Mie Prefecture
  - Inabe
- Shiga Prefecture
  - Maibara
  - Taga

=== Climate ===
The city has a climate characterized by hot, humid summers, and mild winters (Köppen climate classification Cfa). The average annual temperature in Ōgaki is 16.0 °C (60.8 °F). The average annual rainfall is 1,963.5 mm (77.30 in) with July as the wettest month. The temperatures are highest on average in August, at around 28.1 °C (82.6 °F), and lowest in January, at around 4.7 °C (40.5 °F).

Climate data for Ōgaki (1991−2020 normals, extremes 1978−present)
Month	Jan	Feb	Mar	Apr	May	Jun	Jul	Aug	Sep	Oct	Nov	Dec	Year
Record high °C (°F)	17.4 (63.3)	20.8 (69.4)	25.2 (77.4)	29.7 (85.5)	33.3 (91.9)	35.9 (96.6)	38.7 (101.7)	39.6 (103.3)	37.8 (100.0)	31.9 (89.4)	25.4 (77.7)	22.7 (72.9)	39.6 (103.3)
Mean daily maximum °C (°F)	8.6 (47.5)	9.7 (49.5)	13.7 (56.7)	19.4 (66.9)	24.3 (75.7)	27.5 (81.5)	31.3 (88.3)	33.0 (91.4)	28.9 (84.0)	23.2 (73.8)	17.1 (62.8)	11.2 (52.2)	20.7 (69.2)
Daily mean °C (°F)	4.7 (40.5)	5.3 (41.5)	8.7 (47.7)	14.2 (57.6)	19.2 (66.6)	23.0 (73.4)	26.9 (80.4)	28.1 (82.6)	24.3 (75.7)	18.6 (65.5)	12.5 (54.5)	7.1 (44.8)	16.1 (60.9)
Mean daily minimum °C (°F)	1.2 (34.2)	1.5 (34.7)	4.4 (39.9)	9.5 (49.1)	14.8 (58.6)	19.4 (66.9)	23.7 (74.7)	24.7 (76.5)	20.8 (69.4)	14.7 (58.5)	8.4 (47.1)	3.4 (38.1)	12.2 (54.0)
Record low °C (°F)	−5.3 (22.5)	−7.0 (19.4)	−4.5 (23.9)	0.9 (33.6)	6.5 (43.7)	13.0 (55.4)	17.0 (62.6)	17.9 (64.2)	11.6 (52.9)	4.5 (40.1)	−0.2 (31.6)	−3.8 (25.2)	−7.0 (19.4)
Average precipitation mm (inches)	68.8 (2.71)	76.2 (3.00)	130.4 (5.13)	167.9 (6.61)	210.9 (8.30)	244.7 (9.63)	282.9 (11.14)	166.1 (6.54)	248.8 (9.80)	168.8 (6.65)	86.1 (3.39)	76.3 (3.00)	1,963.5 (77.30)
Average precipitation days (≥ 1.0 mm)	9.1	8.5	10.0	9.8	10.1	11.5	13.1	10.0	11.5	8.9	7.5	10.0	120
Mean monthly sunshine hours	146.6	148.2	179.6	192.0	196.7	157.1	160.8	199.9	154.0	156.2	142.3	137.6	1,968.5
Source: Japan Meteorological Agency

== Demographics ==
Per Japanese census data, the population of Ōgaki peaked around the year 2000 and has declined slightly since.

Historical population
Year	Pop.	±%
1970	147,764	—
1980	156,215	+5.7%
1990	160,483	+2.7%
2000	161,827	+0.8%
2010	161,160	−0.4%
2020	158,286	−1.8%

== History ==
The area around Ōgaki was part of traditional Mino Province. During the Edo period, the area developed as a castle town for Ōgaki Domain under the Tokugawa shogunate. In the post-Meiji restoration cadastral reforms, the town of Ogaki was established within Anpachi District, Gifu Prefecture with the creation of the modern municipalities system on July 1, 1889. It was raised to city status on April 1, 1918. The city suffered severe flooding during the 1934 Muroto typhoon, and was largely destroyed in six air raids in 1945.

=== Municipal timeline ===
- April 1918: Gained city status
- April 1928: Merged with parts of the village of Kitakuise, Anpachi District (specifically the localities of Kido, Minamiisshiki, Kasagi, Kasanui and Gama)
- December 1934: Merged with village of Minamikuise, Anpachi District
- June 1935: Merged with village of Tagishima, Anpachi District
- June 1936: Merged with village of Yasui, Anpachi District
- February 1940: Merged with villages of Urū and Shizusato, Fuwa District
- October 1947: Merged with villages of Ayasato, Fuwa District, and Sumoto, Anpachi District
- June 1948: Merged with village of Asakusa, Anpachi District
- October 1948: Merged with village of Kawanami and the Maze part of Maki, Anpachi District
- April 1949: Merged with village of Nakagawa, Anpachi District
- April 1951: Merged with village of Wagō, Anpachi District
- June 1952: Merged with village of Mitsukoshi, Anpachi District
- October 1954: Merged with village of Arasaki, Fuwa District
- September 1967: Merged with town of Akasaka, Fuwa District
- April 1988: Established city constitution
- March 27, 2006: Merged with towns of Kamiishizu, Yōrō District, and Sunomata, Anpachi District

== Government ==
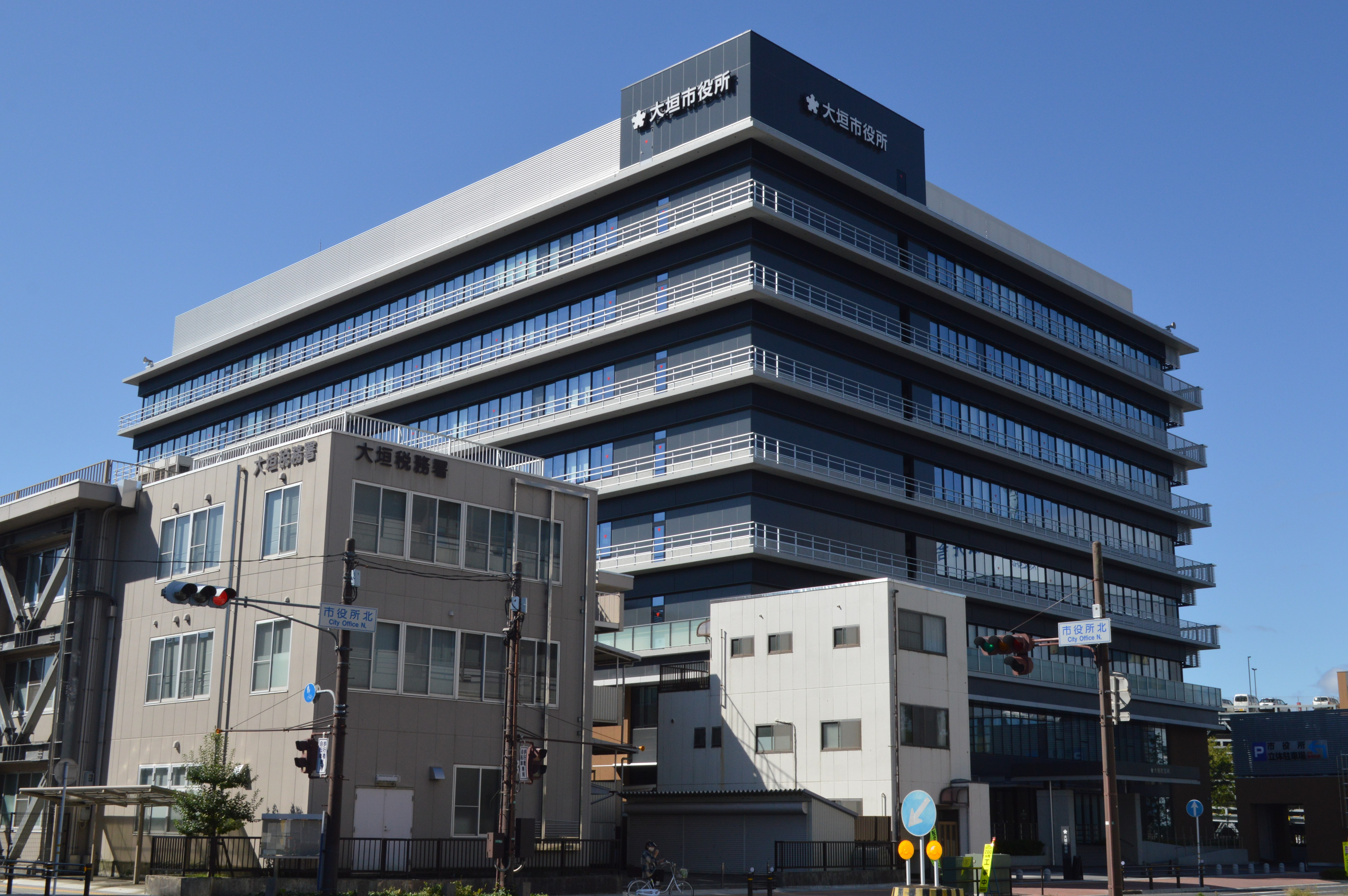
Ōgaki City Hall

Ōgaki has a mayor-council form of government with a directly elected mayor and a unicameral city legislature of 22 members.

== Economy ==
Ibiden, a global electronic components manufacturer, is headquartered in the city.

== Education ==
=== Universities and colleges ===
- Institute of Advanced Media Arts and Sciences (IAMAS)
- Gifu Keizai University
- Ogaki Women's College
- Institute for Fashion Studies (IFS)
- Ogaki Nursing College (moved to Ogaki Medical Association March 31, 2006)
- Nihon Information Processing College
- Nihon General Business College
- Nihon-Chūō Nursing College Ogaki
- Nihon-Chūō Gakuen Culinary College

=== Primary and secondary education ===
Ōgaki has 22 public elementary schools and ten public middle schools operated by the city government and one private middle school. The city has nine public high school operated by the Gifu Prefectural Board of Education, and two private high schools. The prefecture also operates one special education school.

- Ogaki Kita Senior High School
- Ogaki Higashi Senior High School
- Ogaki Minami Senior High School
- Ogaki Nishi Senior High School
- Ogaki Technical High School
- Ogaki-Shogyo Business High School
- Nihon University Ogaki Senior High School
- Hirano Gakuen
- Ogaki Sakura High School
- Ogaki School for Handicapped (primary through senior high)

=== International schools ===
- Escola Brasileira Prof. Kawase - Brazilian primary school

== Transportation ==
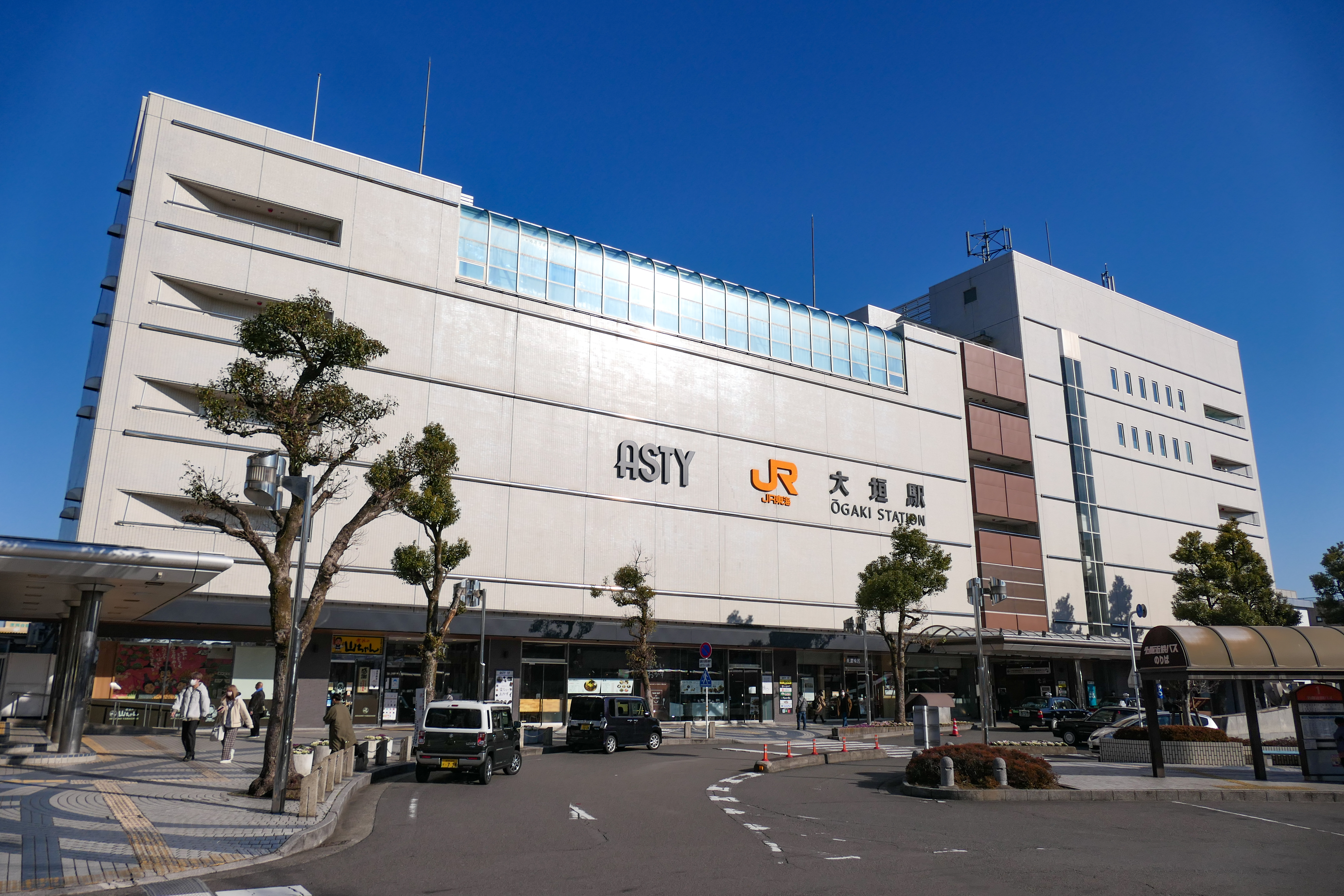
Ōgaki Station

=== Railway ===
- - JR Central - Tōkaidō Main Line
  - Ōgaki - Arao - Mino-Akasaka
- Tarumi Railway - Tarumi Railway Tarumi Line
  - Ōgaki - Higashi-Ōgaki
- Yōrō Railway Yōrō Line
  - Ōtoba - Tomoe - Mino-Yanagi - Nishi-Ōgaki - Ōgaki - Muro - Kita-Ōgaki
- Seino Railway (freight railway)
  - Seino Ichihashi Line: Mino Akasaka Station, Otomezaka Station, Saruiwa Station, Ichihashi Station
  - Seino Hirui Line: Mino Akasaka Station, Mino Okubo Station, Hirui Station

=== Highway ===
- Meishin Expressway- Ogaki IC
- Tōkai-Kanjō Expressway - Ogaki-nishi IC
- National Route 21
- National Route 258
- National Route 365
- National Route 417

== Sister cities ==
Ōgaki is twinned with:

- Glen Eira, Victoria, Australia
- Handan, Hebei, China
- Hioki, Kagoshima, Japan

=== Friendship cities ===
- Beaverton, Oregon, United States
- Changwon, Gyeongsangnam-do, South Korea
- Eugene, Oregon, United States
- Kagoshima, Kagoshima, Japan
- Namur, Wallonia, Belgium
- Stuttgart, Baden-Württemberg, Germany

== Local attractions ==
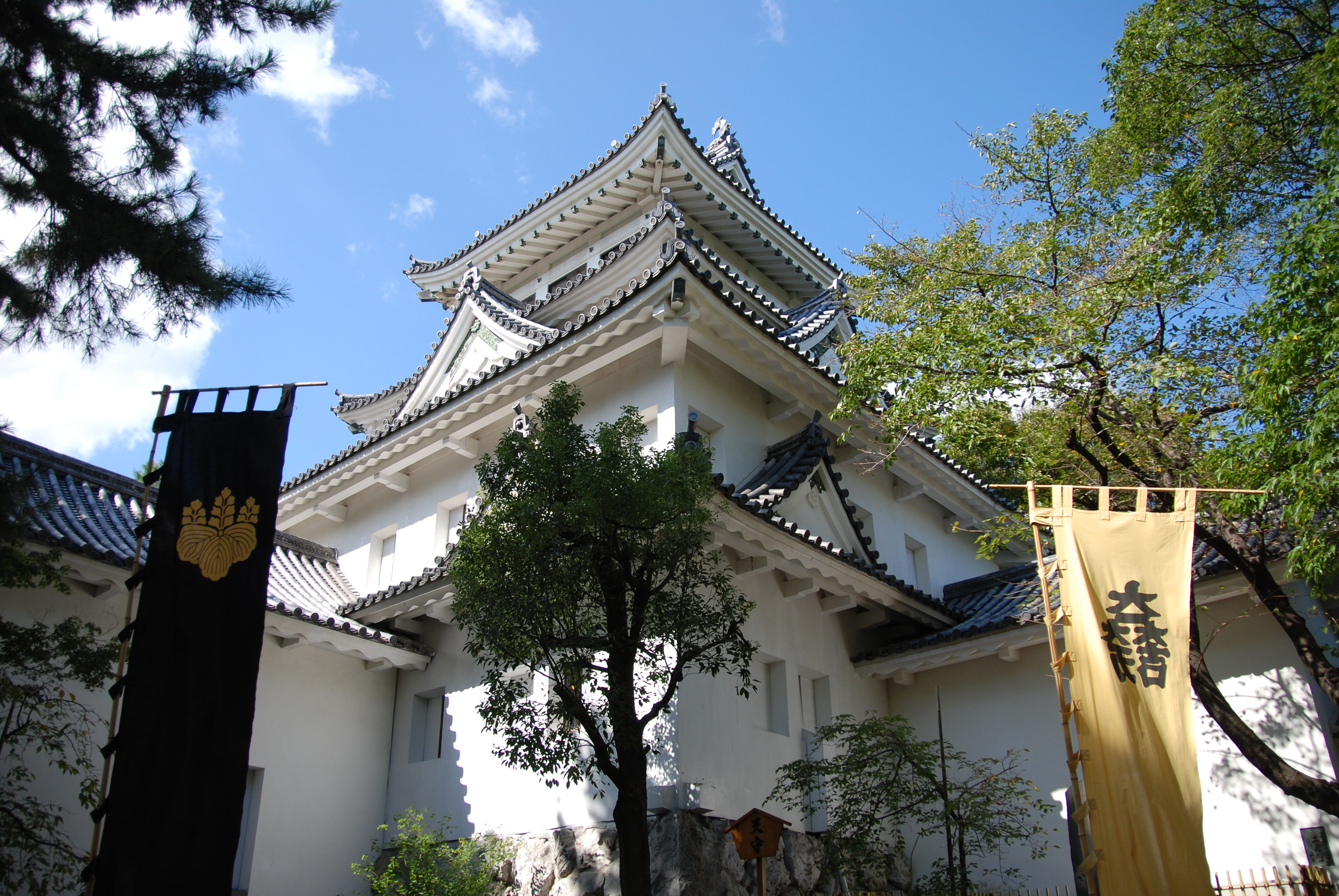
Ōgaki Castle

- Akasaka-juku, the 56th station on the Nakasendō
- Basho's Oku no Hosomichi Haiku Journey Memorial
- Kokubun-ji ruins
- Ōgaki Castle
- Softopia Japan
- Sumiyoshi Lighthouse
- Sunomata Castle

== Notable people ==
- Kozō Andō, kendo teacher
- Otohiko Hara, Japanese businessman
- Shigeki Hosokawa, actor
- Yoshiyuki Ishihara, professional baseball player
- Mirai Navrátil, Czech singer
- Yoshitoki Ōima, manga artist
- Shōta Ōno, professional baseball player
- Hiroshi Tanahashi, professional wrestler
- Yasufumi Tanahashi, politician
- Ikutaro Tokoro, patriot in the closing days of Tokugawa shogunate
- Kenkichi Yabashi, architect known for the construction and design of National Diet Building
