= Anpachi District =

District in Gifu Prefecture, Japan

Coordinates: 35.334926°N 136.647909°E

Location of Anpachi District in Gifu Prefecture

Anpachi District (安八郡, Anpachi-gun) is a district located in Gifu Prefecture, Japan.

As of October 2020 the district has an estimated population of 42,594. The total area is 59.27 km^{2}.

== Towns and villages ==
- Anpachi
- Gōdo
- Wanouchi

== Merger ==
- On March 27, 2006, town of Sunomata, along with the town of Kamiishizu from Yōrō District, merged into the city of Ōgaki.
