= Chūbu region =

Region of Japan

Coordinates: 35°53′N 137°57′E

Chūbu region 中部地方 (Japanese)
- Region of Japan
- The Chūbu region (without Mie) in Japan

- Geofeatures map of Chubu
- Interactive map of Chūbu region
- Country: Japan

Area incl. Mie
  - Total: 72,572.34 km^{2} (28,020.34 sq mi)

Population (October 1, 2025)
  - Total: 20,416,357
  - Density: 281.3242/km^{2} (728.6264/sq mi)

GDP (2022)
  - Total: JP￥91.209 trillion US$674 billion
- Time zone: UTC+09:00 (JST)

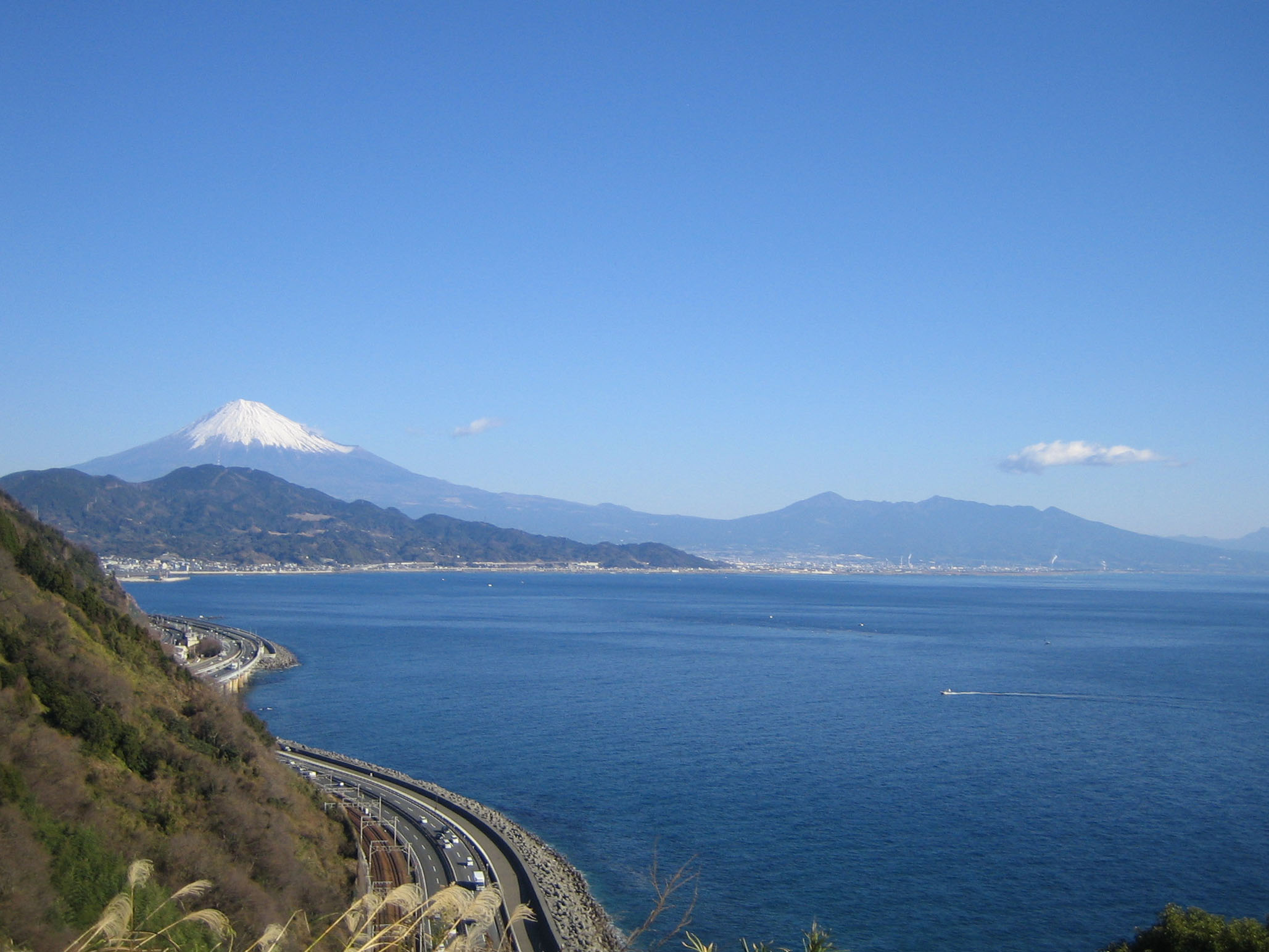
Mount Fuji is the Chūbu region's most famous landmark.

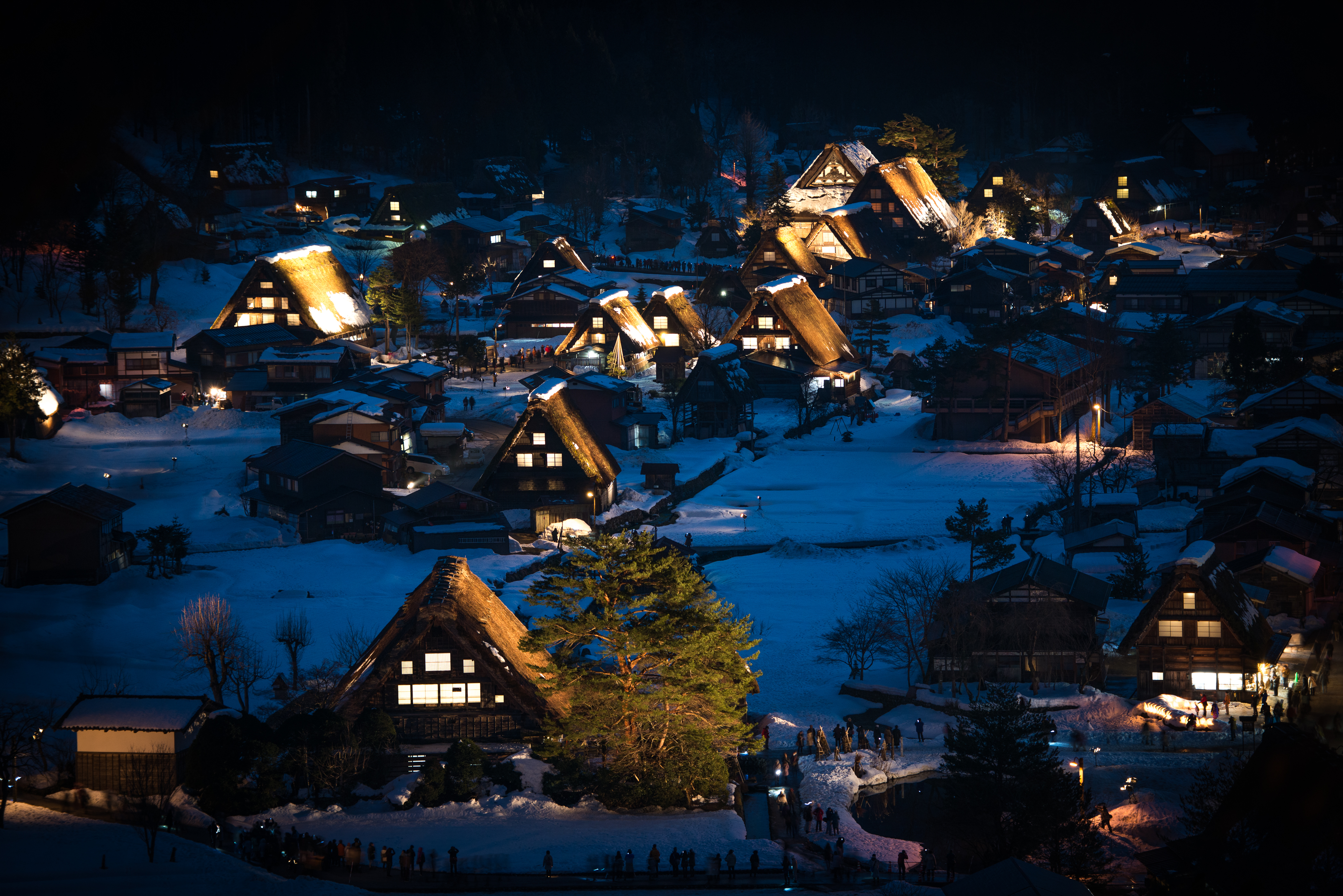
Historic Villages of Shirakawa-gō and Gokayama in Chūbu

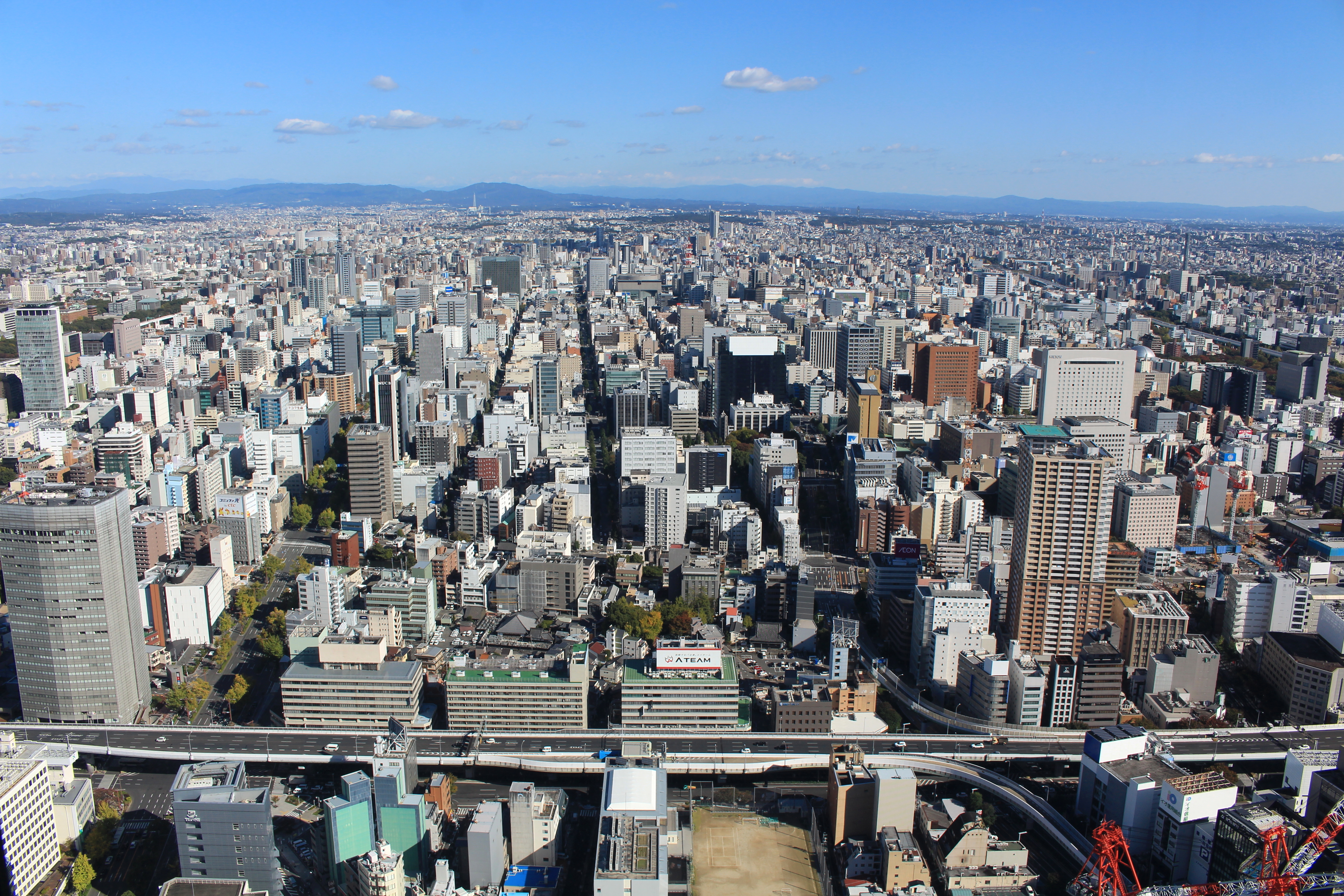
Central Nagoya

The Chūbu region (中部地方, Chūbu chihō; Japanese pronunciation: [c̟͡ɕɨ́ɨ̀.bɯ̈̀, c̟͡ɕɨ̀ɨ́.bɯ̈́ c̟͡ɕí.hò̞ò̞, -c̟͡ɕi̥.hò̞ò̞, -c̟͡ɕi̥.hó̞ò̞, c̟͡ɕɨ́ɨ́.bɯ̈́-]), Central region, or Central Japan (中部日本, Chūbu Nihon) is a large and diverse region in the middle of Honshū, Japan's main island. In a wide, classical definition, it encompasses nine prefectures (ken): Aichi, Fukui, Gifu, Ishikawa, Nagano, Niigata, Shizuoka, Toyama, and Yamanashi.

It is located directly between the Kantō region and the Kansai region and includes the major city of Nagoya as well as Pacific Ocean and Sea of Japan coastlines, extensive mountain resorts, and Mount Fuji.

The region is the widest part of Honshū and the central part is characterized by high, rugged mountains. The Japanese Alps divide the country into the Pacific side, sunny in winter, and the Sea of Japan side, snowy in winter.

Although Mie is part of Kinki/Kansai/Western Japan in traditional geographical regional divisions, Northern Mie is part of the metropolitan area around Nagoya, and Mie is in many practical contexts considered to be part of Tōkai/Chūbu/Central Japan. Including Mie, Chūbu had a population of 22,111,253 as of 1 October 2025.

== Other definitions ==
In the MLIT of the central government, the jurisdiction of the Chūbu regional development bureau (中部地方整備局, Chūbu-chihō seibi-kyoku; (ja)) extends to five prefectures: Gifu, Shizuoka, Aichi, Mie and the Southern part of Nagano.

In the National Police Agency, the Chūbu Regional Police Bureau (中部管区警察局, Chūbu kanku keisatsu-kyoku; (ja)) is responsible for six prefectural police forces: Toyama, Ishikawa, Fukui, Gifu, Aichi and Mie.

In local government, the Chūbu area governors' association (中部圏知事会, Chūbuken chijikai) unites the governors of Toyama, Ishikawa, Fukui, Nagano, Gifu, Shizuoka, Aichi, Mie and Shiga and the mayor of Nagoya City in Aichi.

== Geography ==
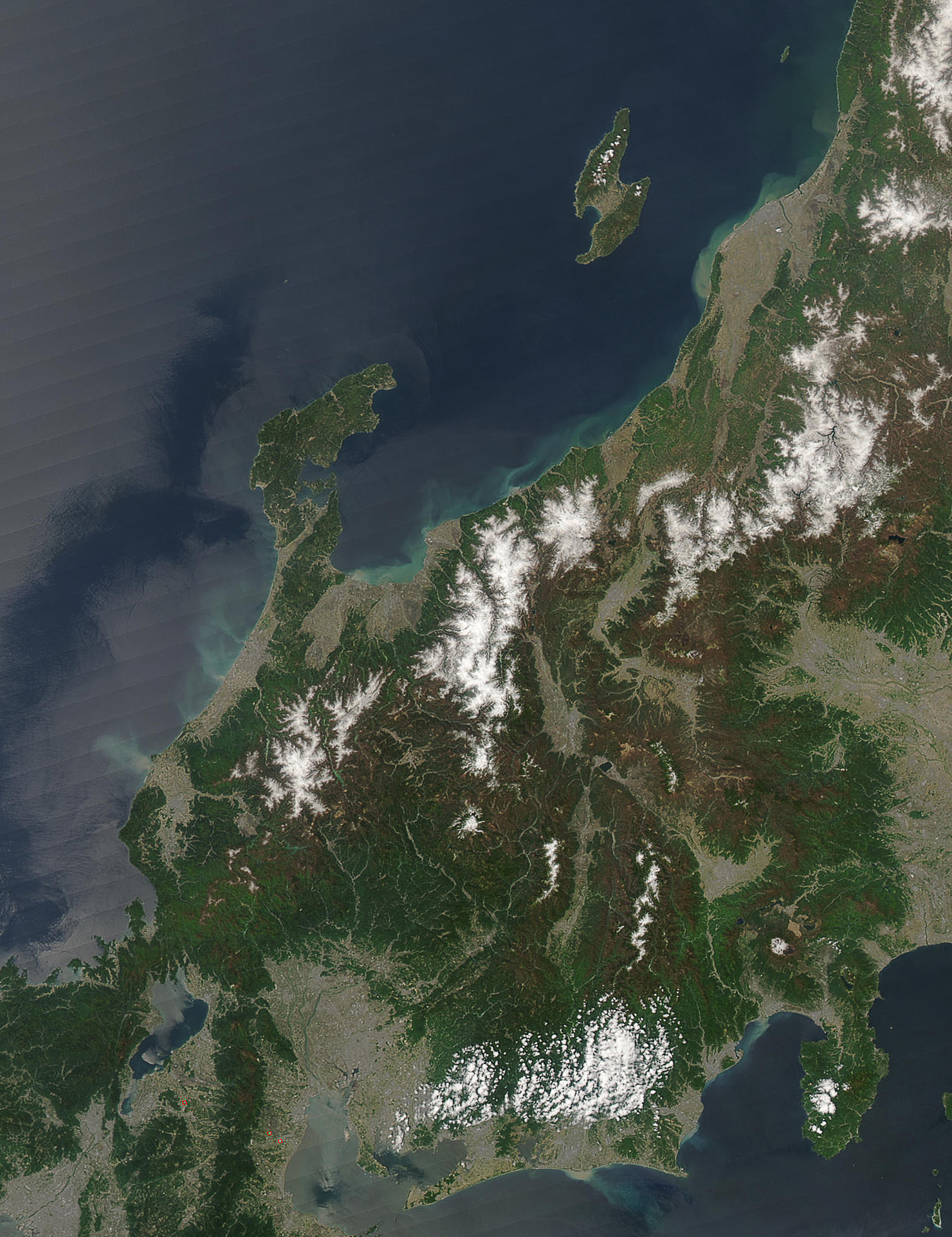
Chubu region (satellite photo)

Located in the center of the Japanese archipelago. It refers to the area between the Kanto, Tohoku and Kansai regions. It began to be used in the late Meiji era as a tentative name for unclassified areas. In a broad sense, it often refers to the eight regional divisions and similar ranges. In a narrow sense it may refer to a range similar to the Tōkai region.

The terrain is mainly rugged and mountainous except for the Nōbi Plain and coastal areas. The steep Japanese Alps rise in the central area. It is located between Tokyo and Osaka, which are the east–west centers of the Japanese economy and culture. Thus the Chubu region has various differences between the eastern side and the western side.

== Subregions ==
The Chūbu region covers a large and geographically diverse area of Honshū which leads to it generally being divided into three distinct subregions: Tōkai, Kōshin'etsu, and Hokuriku. There is also another subregion occasionally referred to in business circles called Chūkyō.

=== Tōkai ===
The Tōkai region, mostly bordering the Pacific Ocean, is a narrow corridor interrupted in places by mountains that descend into the sea.

Since the Tokugawa period (1600–1867), this corridor has been critical in linking Tokyo, Kyoto, and Osaka. One of old Japan's most important ancient roadways, the Tōkaidō, ran through it connecting Tokyo (at that time called Edo) and Kyoto, the old imperial capital. In the twentieth century, it became the route for new super-express highways and high-speed railroad lines (shinkansen). The area consists of Aichi, Mie, Shizuoka, and southern Gifu prefectures.

A number of small alluvial plains are found in the corridor section. A mild climate, favorable location relatively close to the great metropolitan complexes, and availability of fast transportation have made this area a center for truck-gardening and out-of-season vegetables. Upland areas of rolling hills are extensively given over to the growing of mandarin oranges and tea. Nagoya, which faces Ise Bay, is a center for heavy industry, including iron and steel and machinery manufacturing. The corridor also has a number of small but important industrial centers. The western part of Tōkai includes the Nōbi Plain, where rice was being grown by the seventh century.

==== Chūkyō ====
The three Tōkai prefectures centered on Nagoya (Aichi, Gifu, and Mie) have particularly strong economic ties, and the parts of these prefectures that are closest to the city comprise the Chūkyō Metropolitan Area. This area boasts the third strongest economy in Japan and this influence can sometimes extend into the more remote parts of these prefectures that are farther away from Nagoya. Thus, these three prefectures are sometimes called the "Chūkyō region" in a business sense. This name does not see widespread usage throughout Japan; however, as the economy in the area strengthens, this name may become more well-known country-wide.

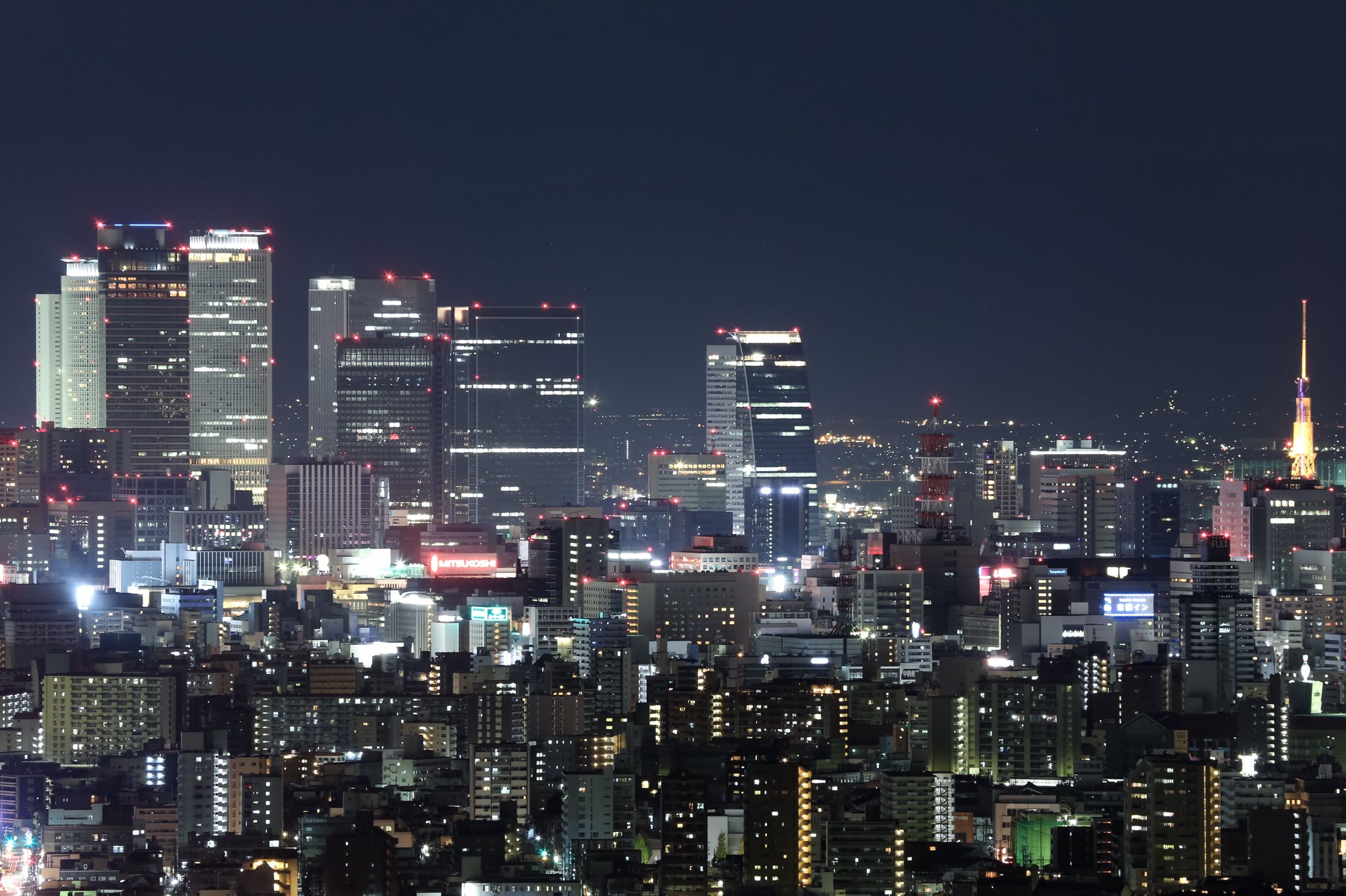
Nagoya City

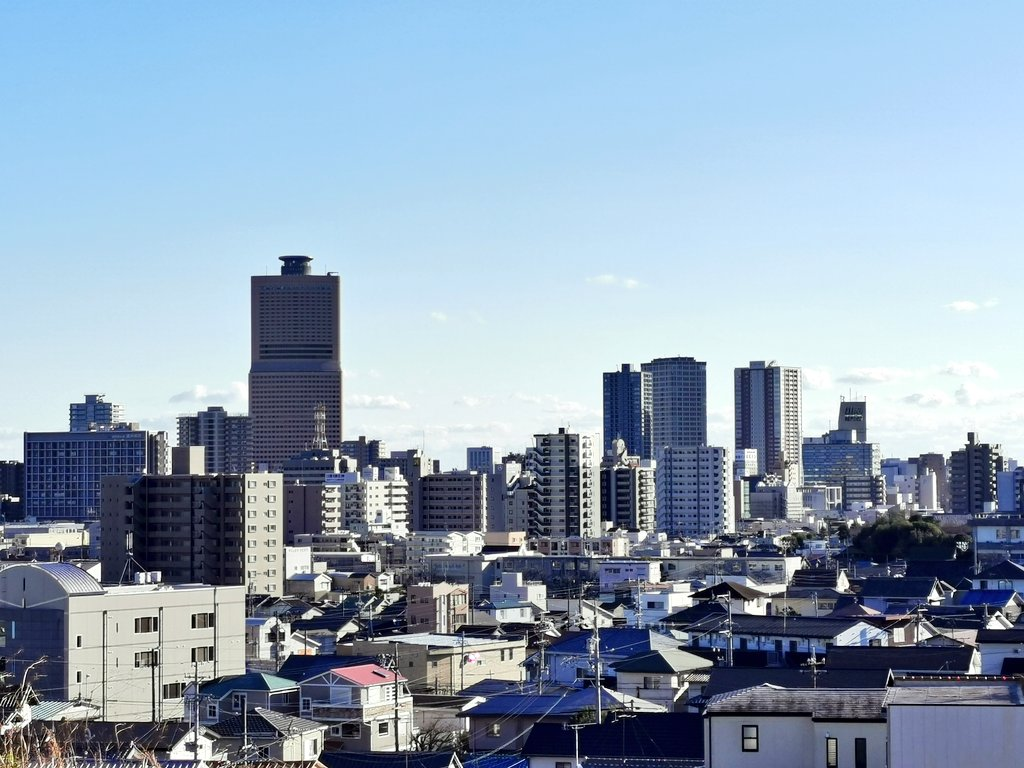
Hamamatsu City

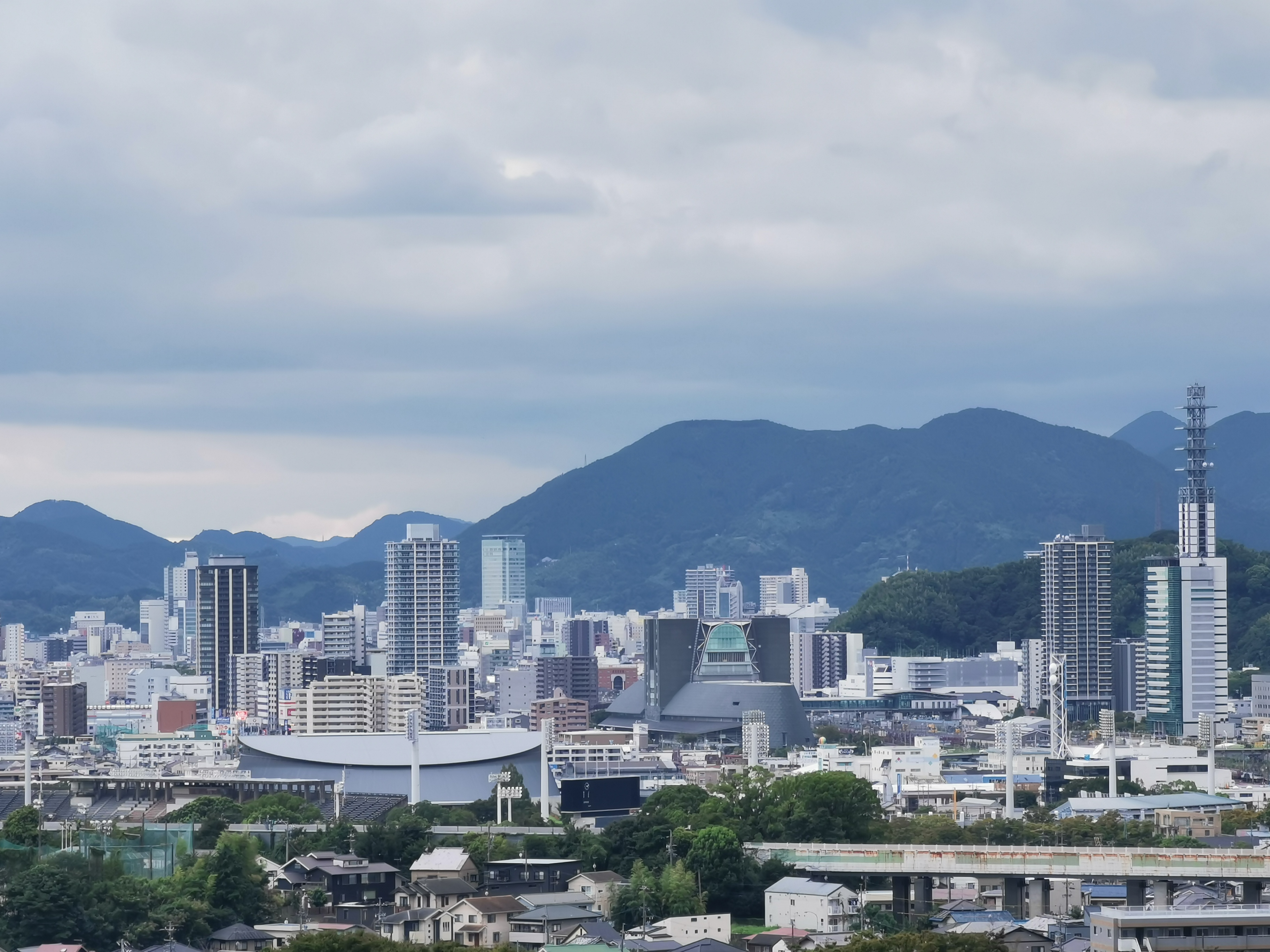
Shizuoka City

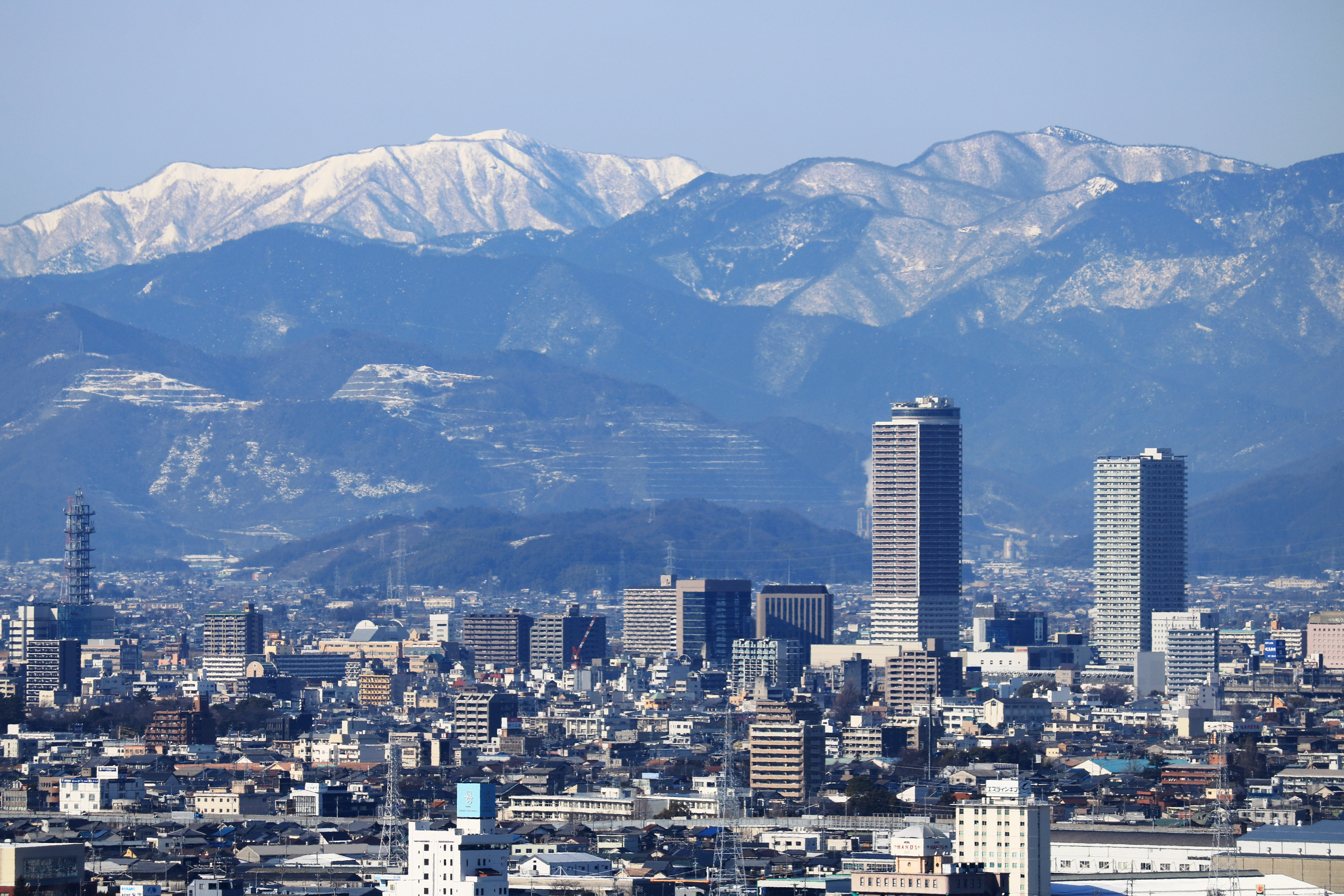
Gifu City

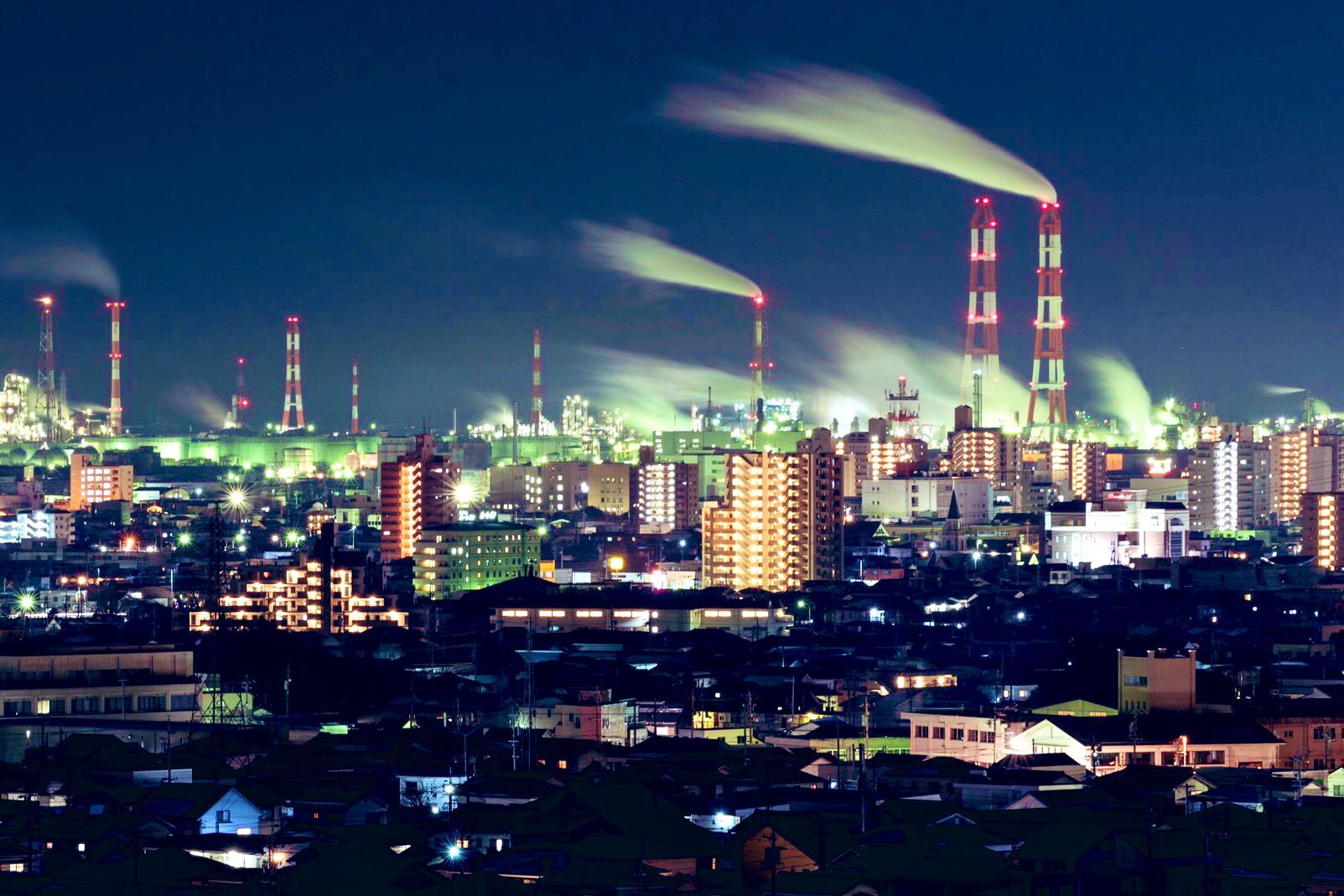
Yokkaichi City
(Kinki region)

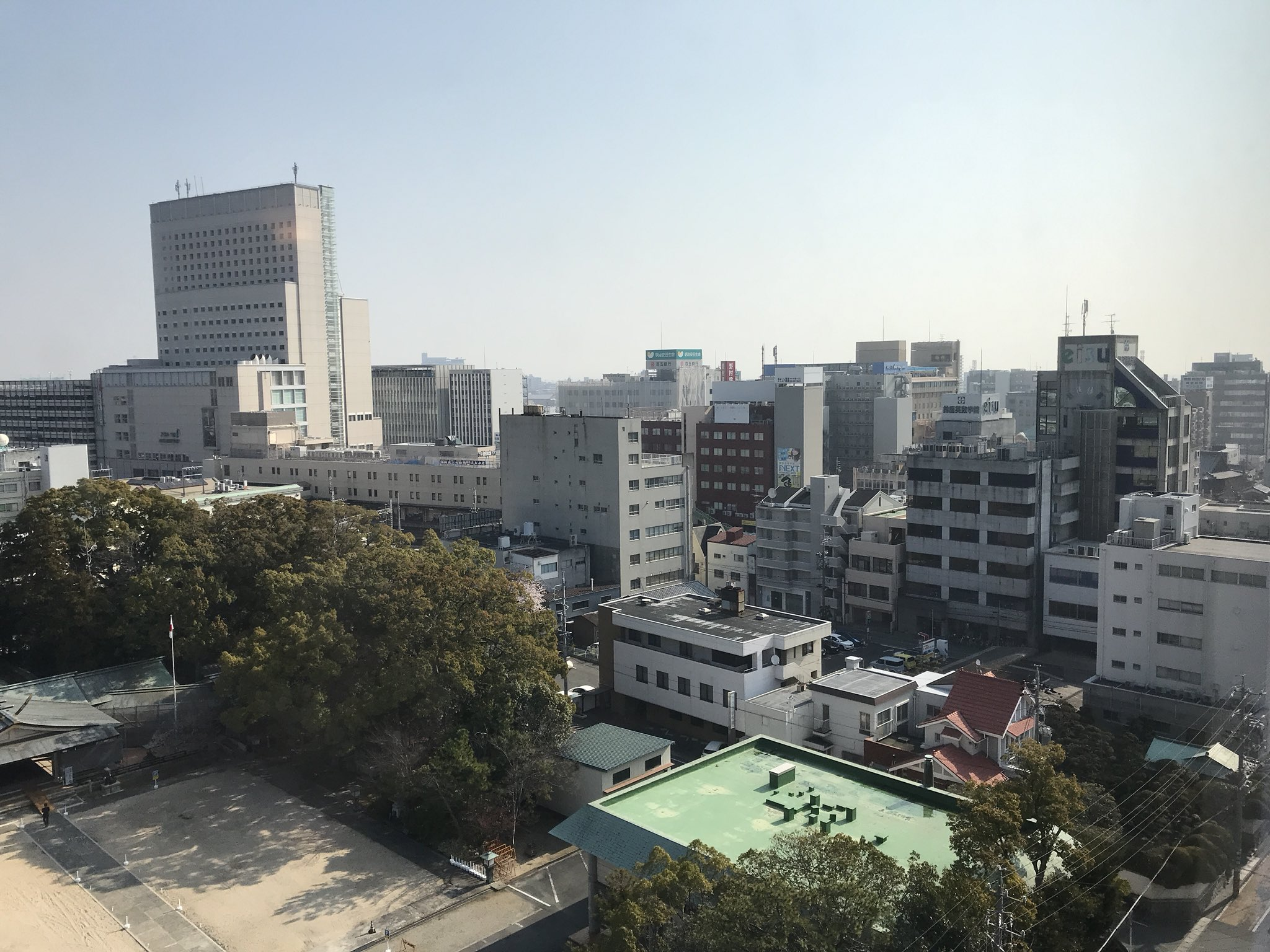
Tsu City
(Kinki region)

=== Kōshin'etsu ===
Kōshin'etsu is an area of complex and high rugged mountains—often called the "roof of Japan"—that include the Japanese Alps. The population is chiefly concentrated in six elevated basins connected by narrow valleys. It was long a main silk-producing area, although output declined after World War II. Much of the labor formerly required in silk production was absorbed by the district's diversified manufacturing industry, which included precision instruments, machinery, textiles, food processing, and other light manufacturing. Kōshin'etsu means Yamanashi, Nagano, and Niigata prefectures; Niigata is also included to the Hokuriku region. Yamanashi, Nagano and northern Gifu Prefecture are sometimes referred to as Chūō-kōchi or Tōsan region.

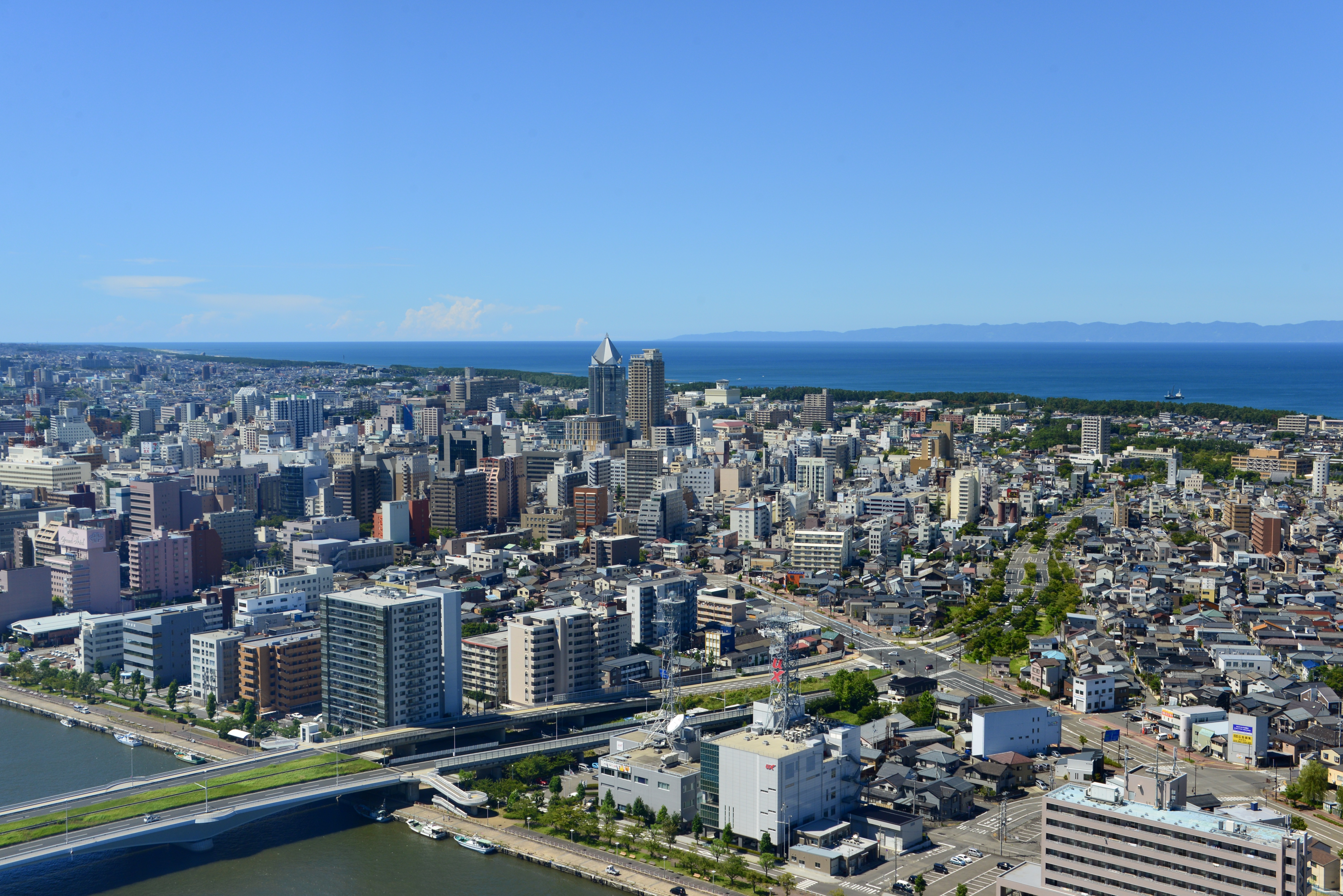
Niigata City

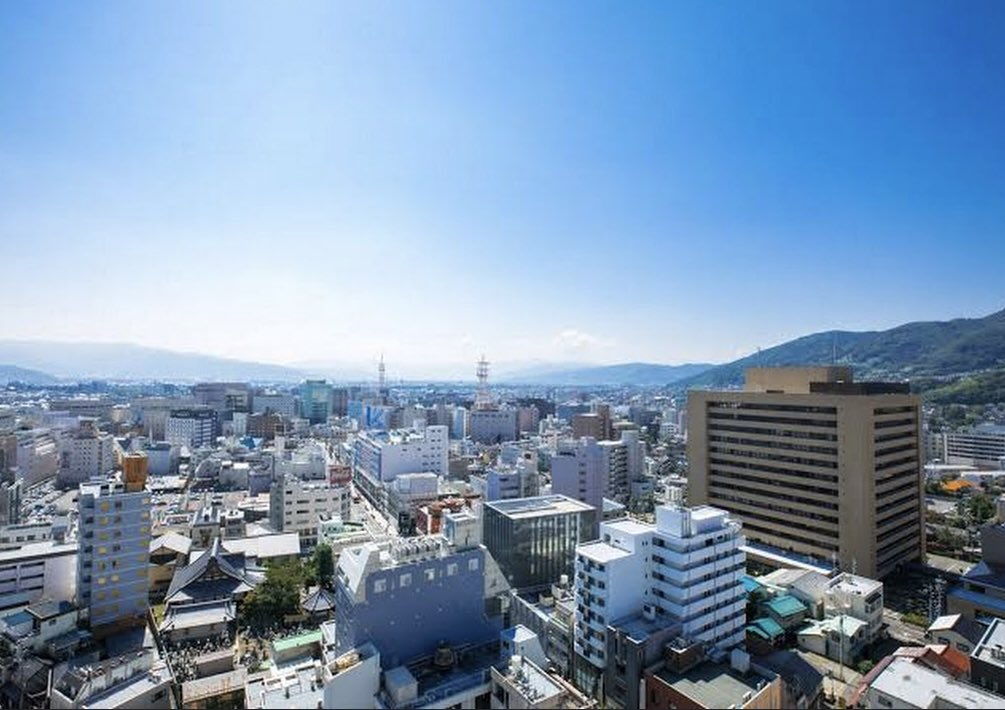
Nagano City

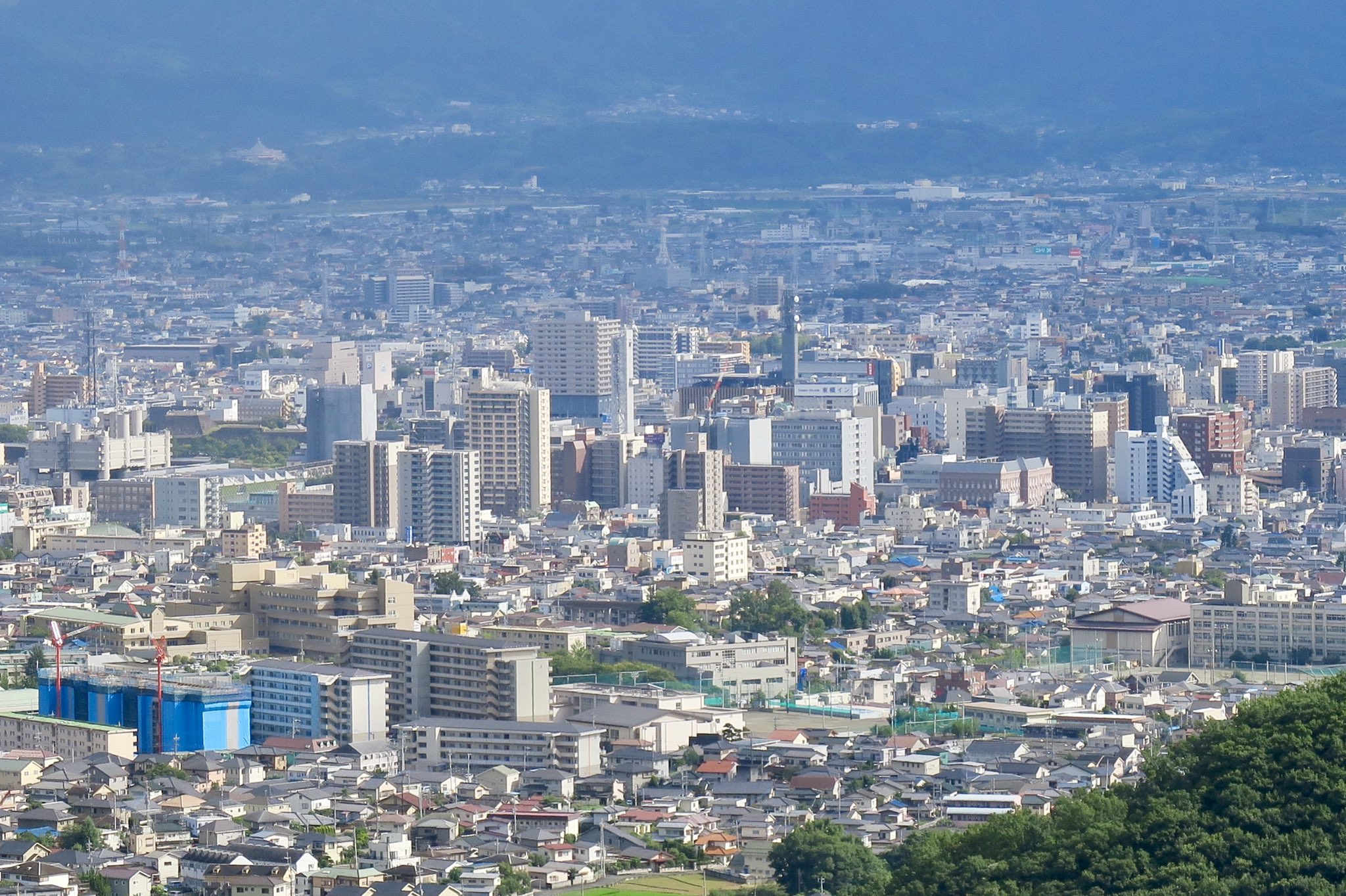
Kōfu City

=== Hokuriku ===
The Hokuriku region lies on the Sea of Japan coastline, northwest of the massive mountains that comprise Kōshin'etsu. Hokuriku includes the four prefectures of Ishikawa, Fukui, most of Niigata and Toyama,

The district has very heavy snowfall (sometimes enough to block major roads) and strong winds in winter, and its turbulent rivers are the source of abundant hydroelectric power. Niigata Prefecture is the site of domestic gas and oil production as well. Industrial development is extensive, especially in the cities in Niigata and Toyama; Fukui and Ishikawa prefectures also have large manufacturing industries.

Historically, Hokuriku's development is owed to markets in the Kansai region, however recently the urban areas at the heart of the Kantō region and Tōkai region are having a heavy an influence as well. Hokuriku has port facilities which are mainly to facilitate trade with Russia, Korea and China. Transportation between Niigata and Toyama used to be geographically limited and so Niigata has seen especially strong influence from the Kantō region, because of this Niigata Prefecture is often classified as being part of the Kōshin'etsu region with Nagano and Yamanashi Prefectures.

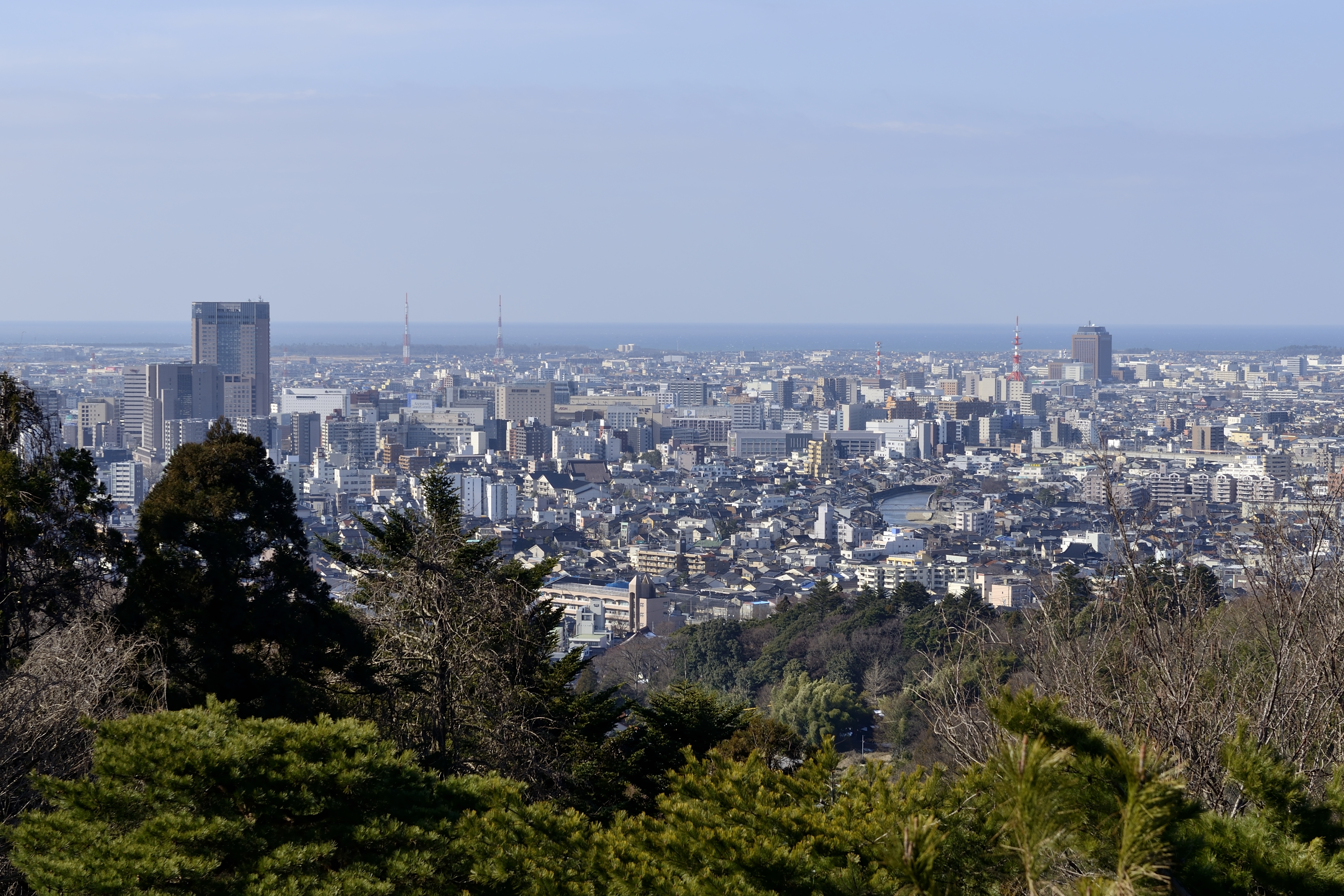
Kanazawa City

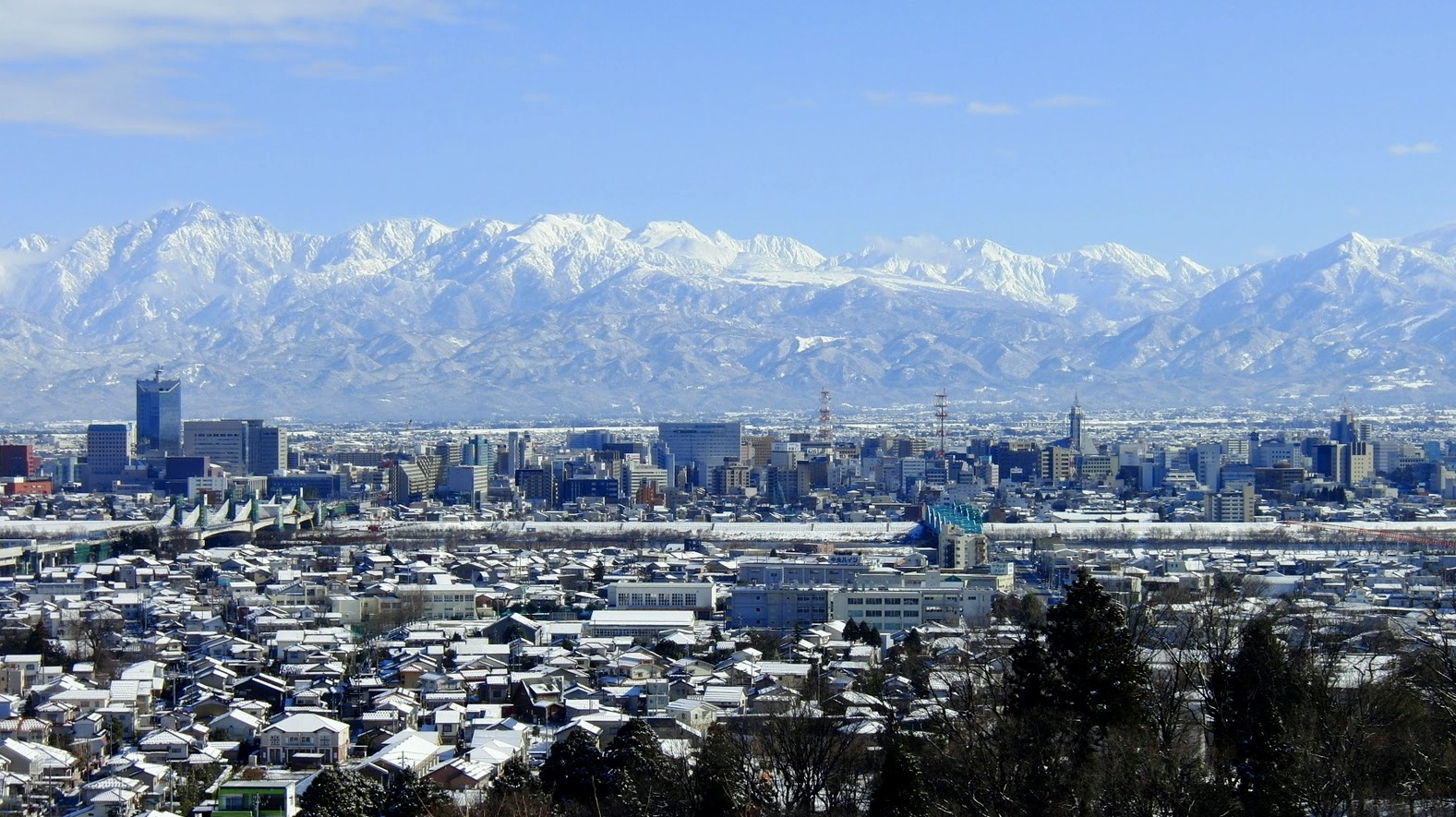
Toyama City

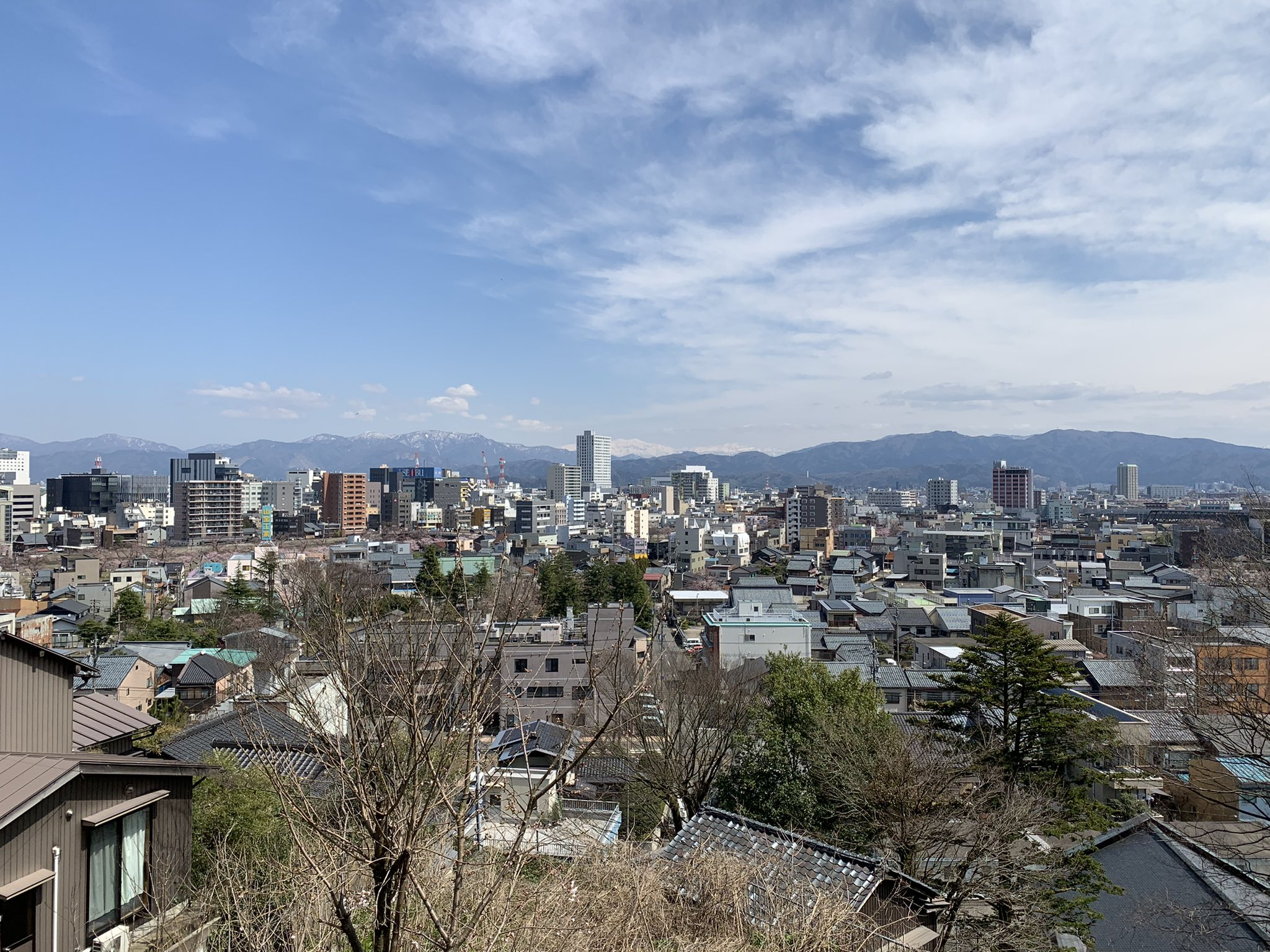
Fukui City

== Transport ==
The region's largest airport is Chubu Centrair International Airport which provides most domestic and international destinations, it is located 35 km (22 mi) south of Nagoya. There are also smaller airports across the region including Niigata Airport, Komatsu Airport, and Mt. Fuji Shizuoka Airport.

== Demographics ==
The three most dense areas of Chūbu region are Chūkyō metropolitan area (greater Nagoya), Niigata-Toyama area at Hokuriku subregion, and Nagano at the mountains (Chūō-kōchi).

Per Japanese census data, and, Chūbu region has had positive population growth.

Historical population
Year	Pop.	±%
1920	10,702,000	—
1930	11,978,000	+11.9%
1940	13,113,000	+9.5%
1950	15,458,000	+17.9%
1960	16,565,000	+7.2%
1970	18,091,000	+9.2%
1980	19,984,000	+10.5%
1990	21,023,000	+5.2%
2000	21,628,238	+2.9%
2010	21,715,822	+0.4%
2020	22,078,654	+1.7%
Note: This excludes Mie Prefecture

== Major cities ==
List of 20 major cities in Chūbu
Nagoya city Niigata city	Rank	Cities	Prefecture	Population	Rank	Cities	Prefecture	Population	Hamamatsu city Shizuoka city
Nagoya city Niigata city	1	Nagoya	Aichi	2,331,078	11	Toyohashi	Aichi	377,453	Hamamatsu city Shizuoka city
Nagoya city Niigata city	2	Niigata	Niigata	797,591	12	Nagano	Nagano	370,632	Hamamatsu city Shizuoka city
Nagoya city Niigata city	3	Hamamatsu	Shizuoka	791,707	13	Kasugai	Aichi	306,764	Hamamatsu city Shizuoka city
Nagoya city Niigata city	4	Shizuoka	Shizuoka	690,881	14	Nagaoka	Niigata	266,539	Hamamatsu city Shizuoka city
Nagoya city Niigata city	5	Kanazawa	Ishikawa	466,029	15	Fukui	Fukui	264,217	Hamamatsu city Shizuoka city
Nagoya city Niigata city	6	Toyota	Aichi	426,162	16	Fuji	Shizuoka	245,015	Hamamatsu city Shizuoka city
Nagoya city Niigata city	7	Toyama	Toyama	415,844	17	Matsumoto	Nagano	239,466	Hamamatsu city Shizuoka city
Nagoya city Niigata city	8	Gifu	Gifu	400,118	18	Numazu	Shizuoka	189,486	Hamamatsu city Shizuoka city
Nagoya city Niigata city	9	Okazaki	Aichi	386,999	19	Jōetsu	Niigata	189,430	Hamamatsu city Shizuoka city
Nagoya city Niigata city	10	Ichinomiya	Aichi	379,654	20	Kōfu	Yamanashi	188,824	Hamamatsu city Shizuoka city

Capital cities of the nine prefectures of Chūbu
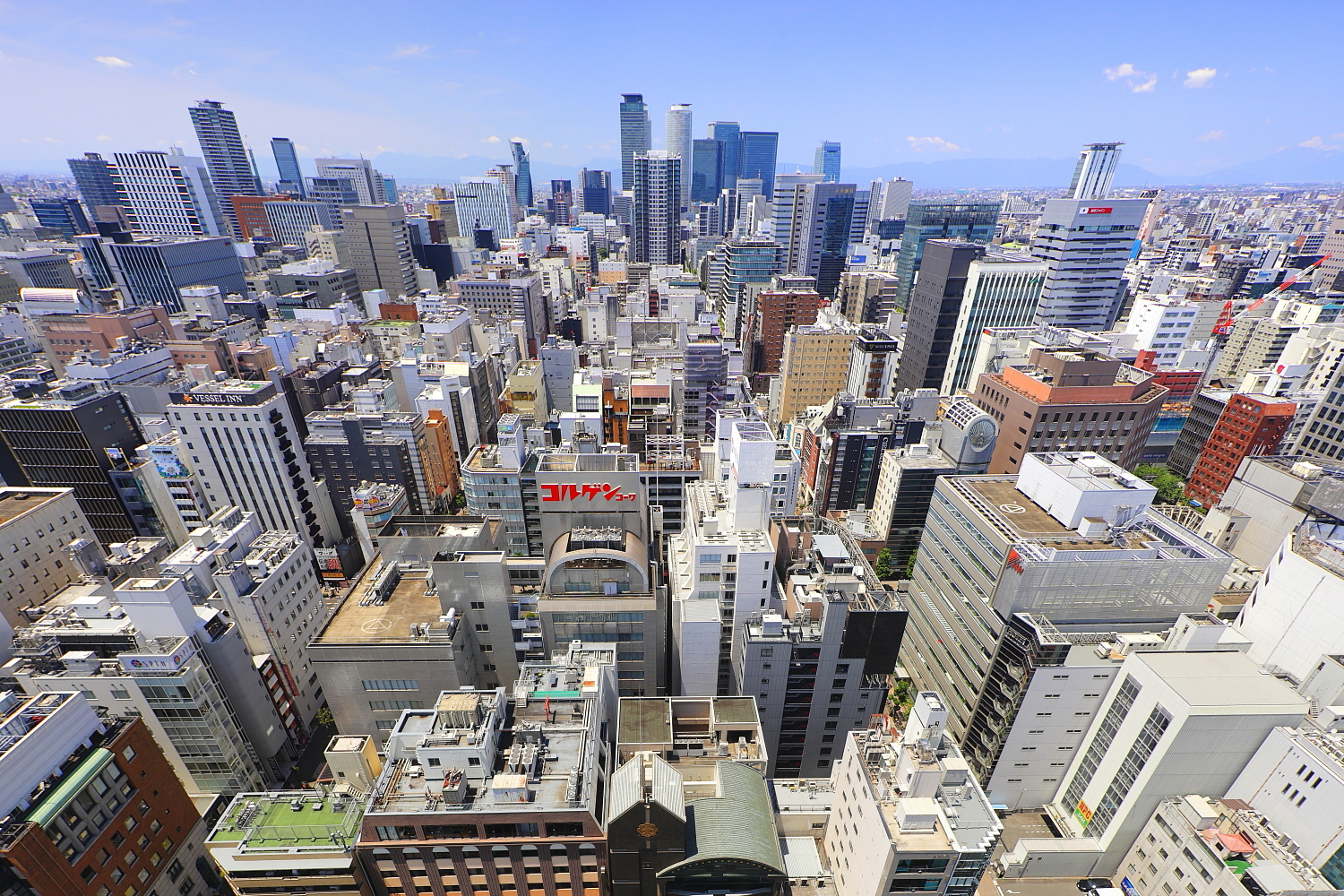
Nagoya city

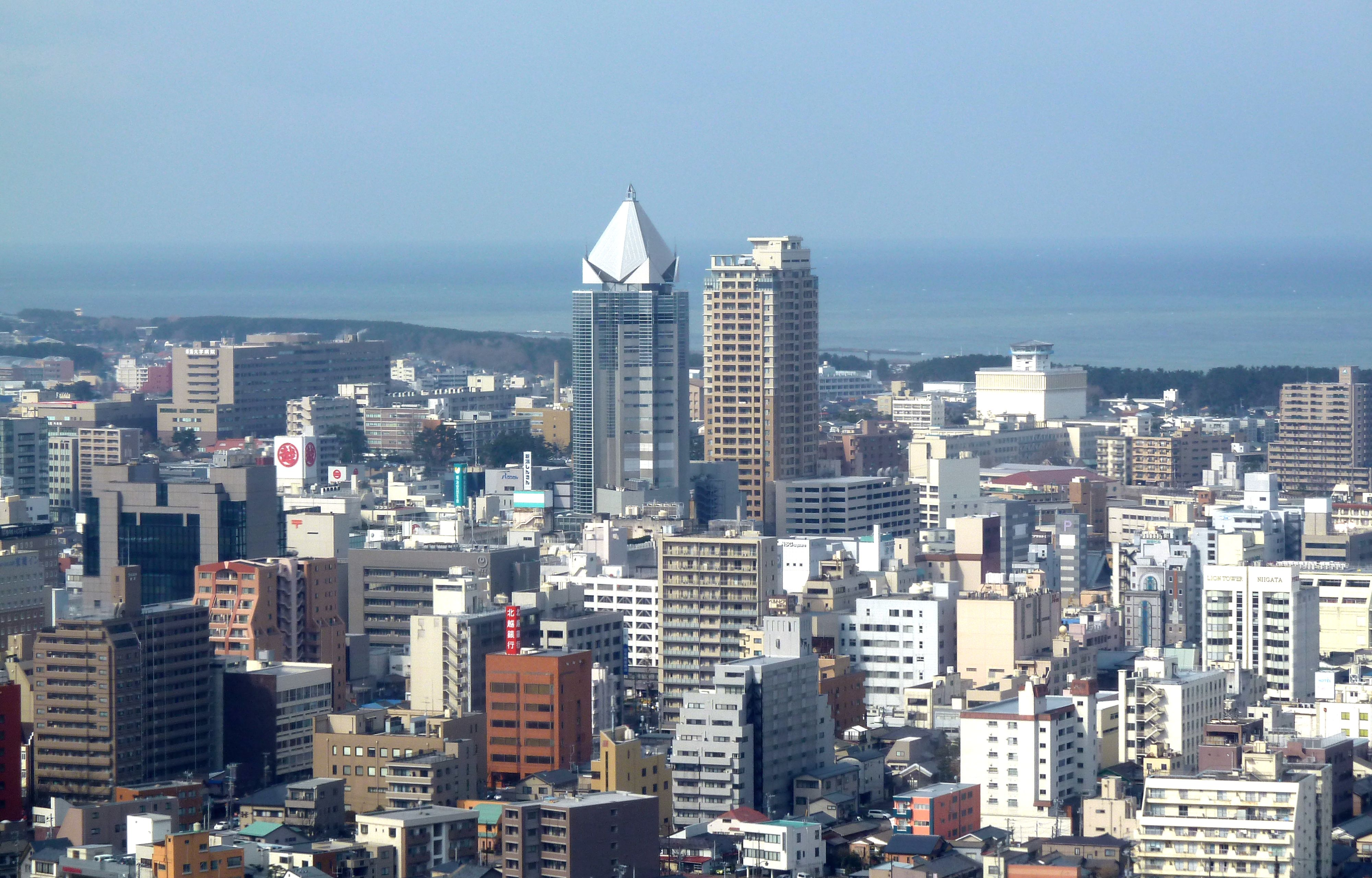
Niigata city

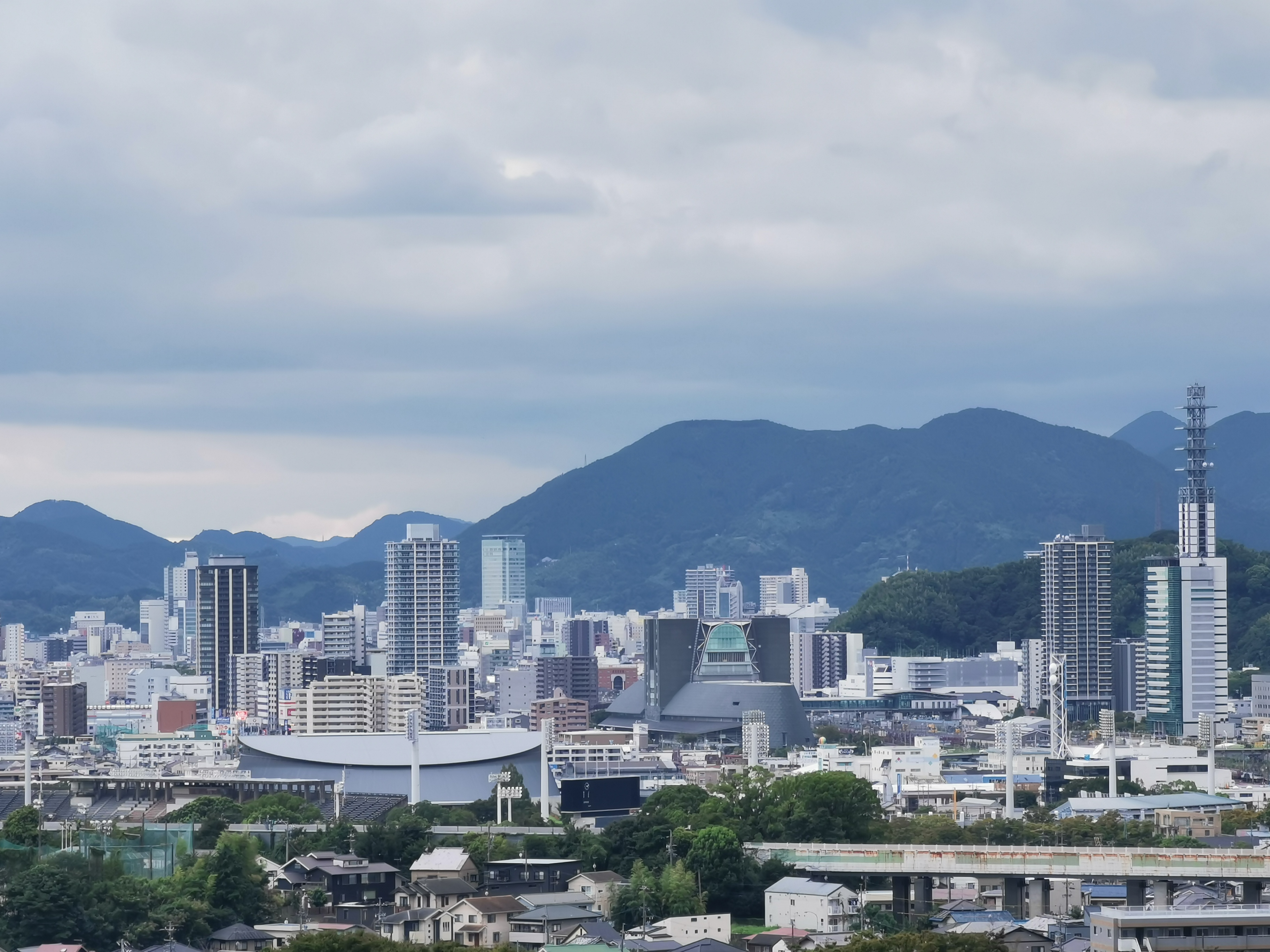
Shizuoka city

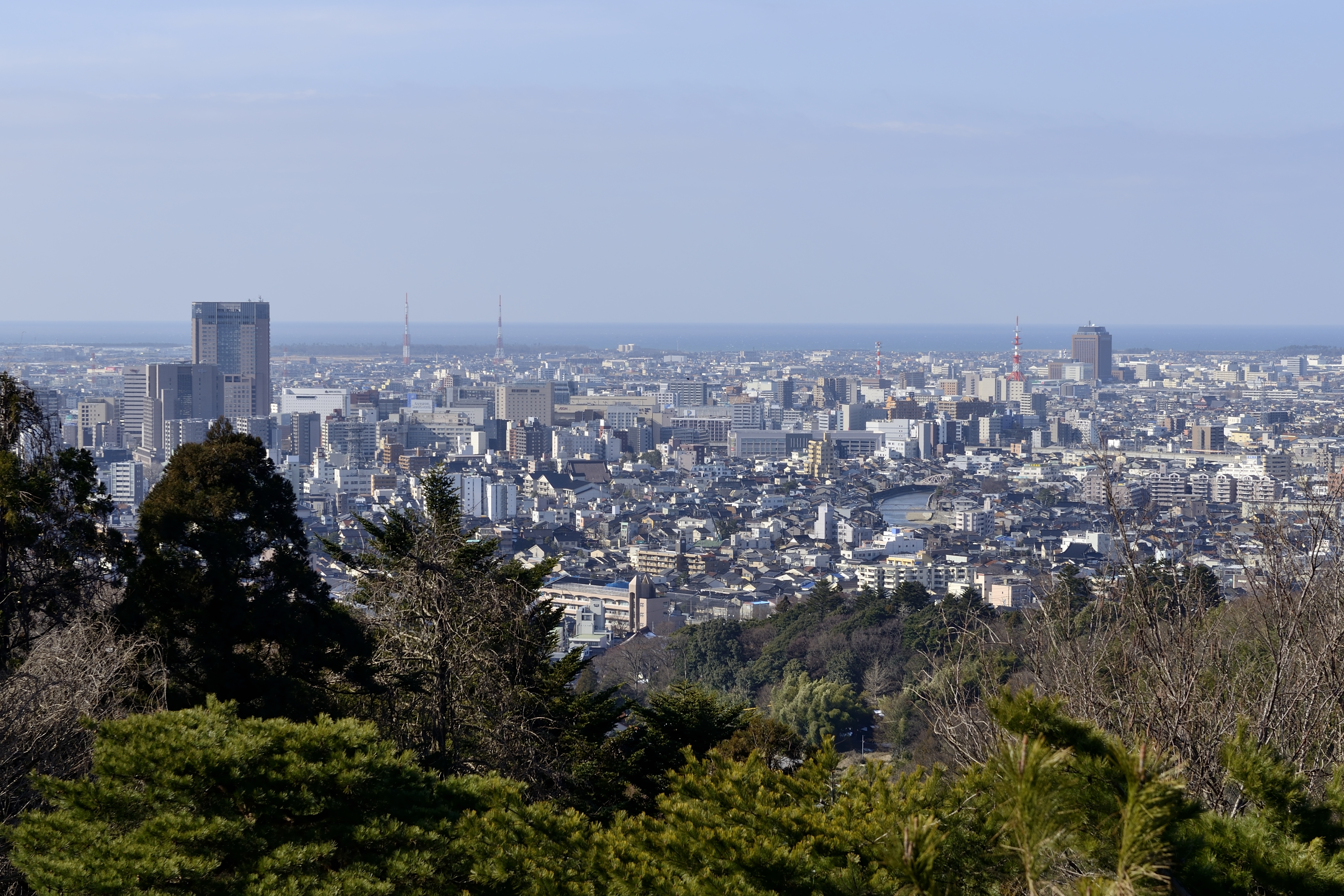
Kanazawa city

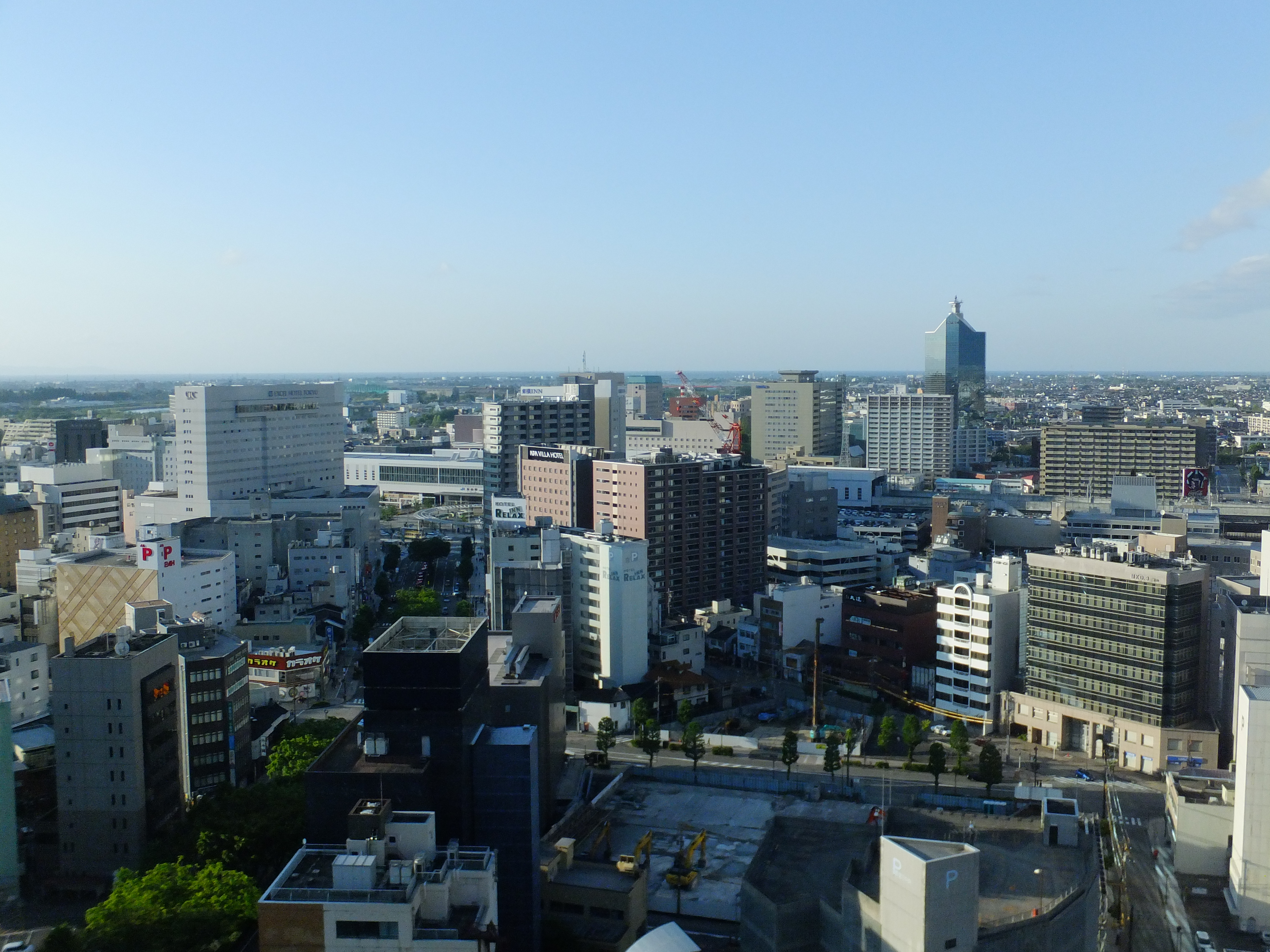
Toyama city

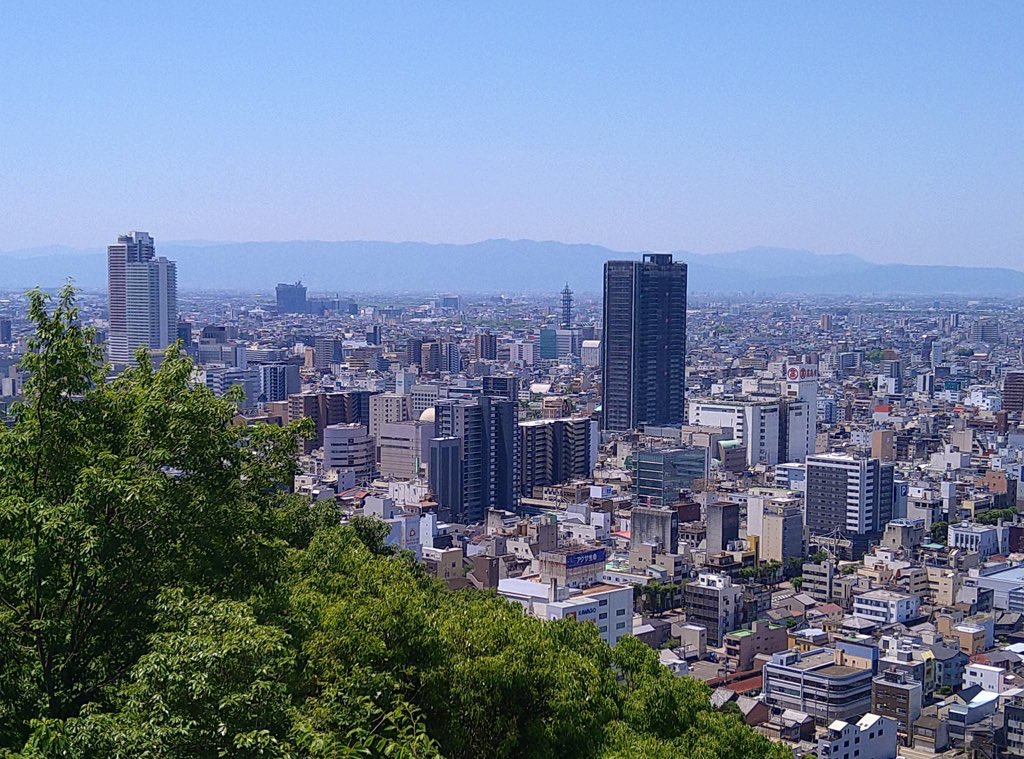
Gifu city

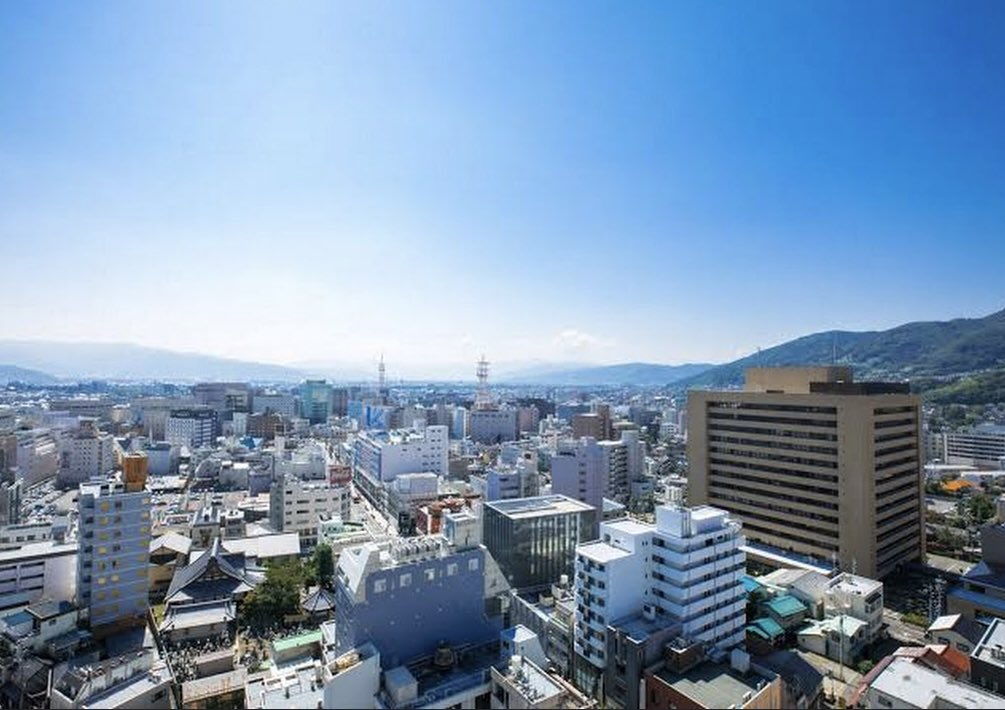
Nagano city

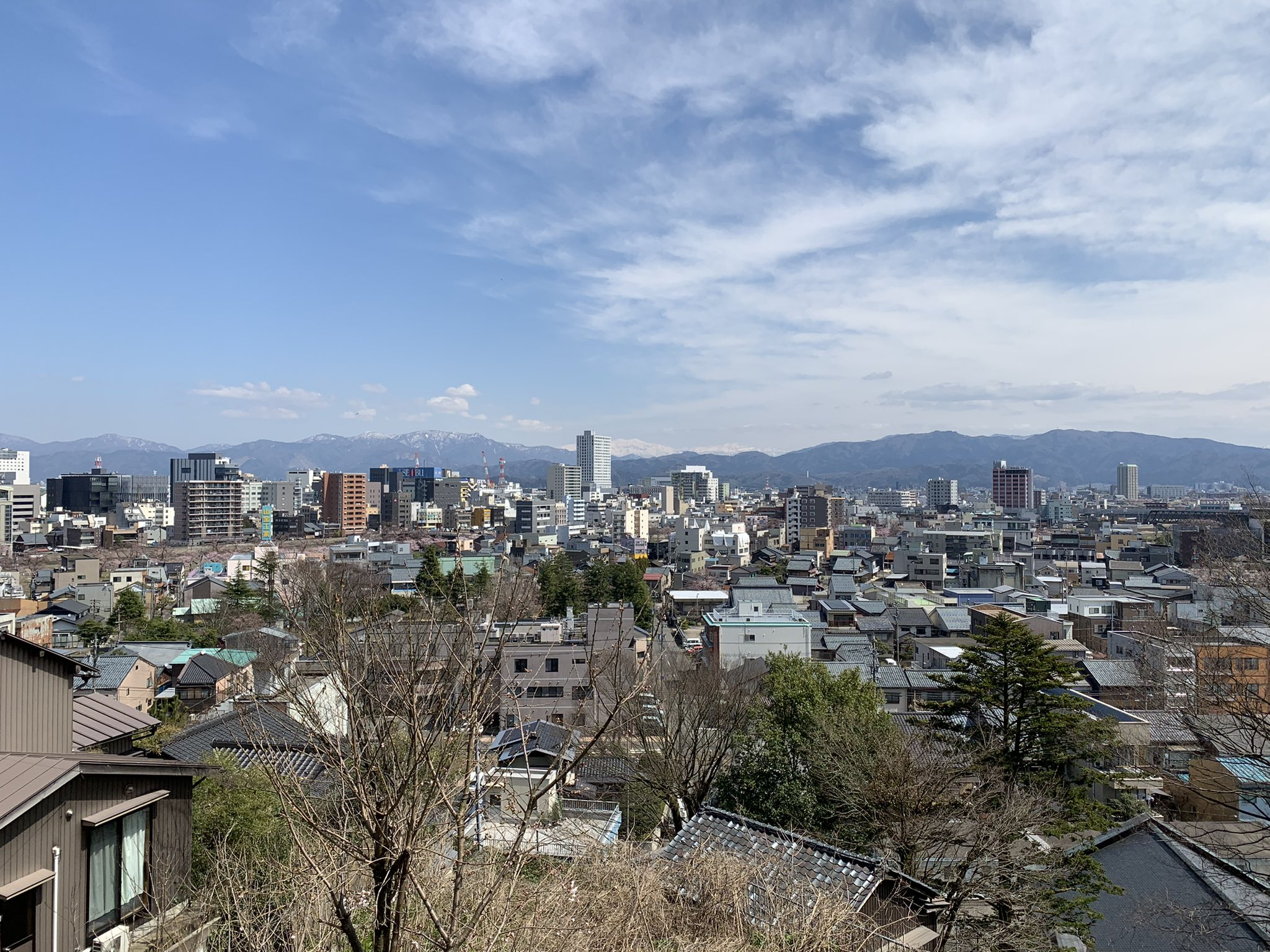
Fukui city

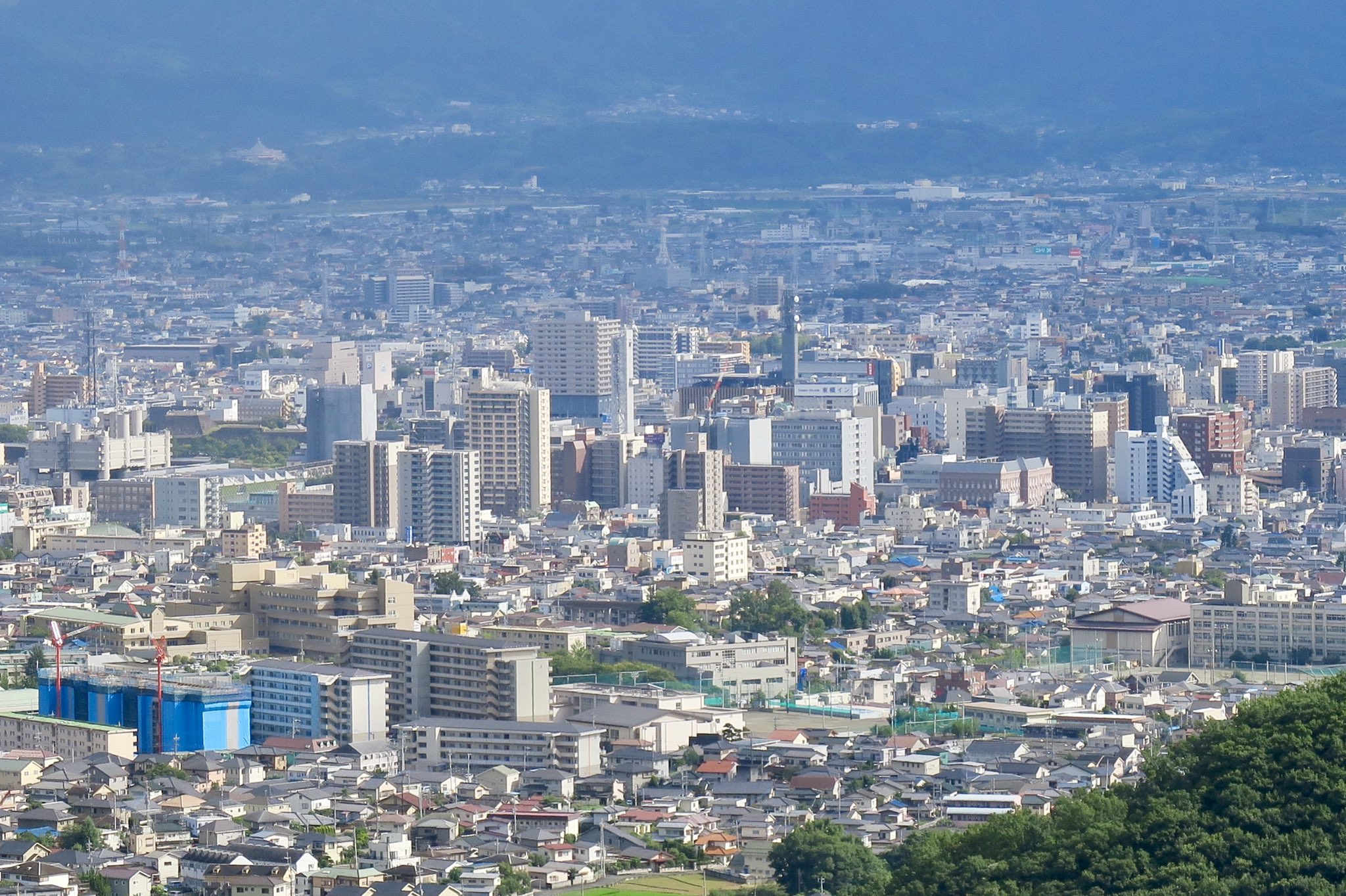
Kōfu city

Designated cities

- Hamamatsu City: a designated city
- Nagoya City: a designated city, the capital of Aichi Prefecture
- Niigata City: a designated city, the capital of Niigata Prefecture
- Shizuoka City:a designated city, the capital of Shizuoka Prefecture

Core cities

- Fukui City: a core city, the capital of Fukui Prefecture
- Gifu City: a core city, the capital of Gifu Prefecture
- Kanazawa City: a core city, the capital of Ishikawa Prefecture
- Kofu City: a core city, the capital of Yamanashi Prefecture
- Nagano City: a core city, the capital of Nagano Prefecture
- Toyama City: a core city, the capital of Toyama Prefecture
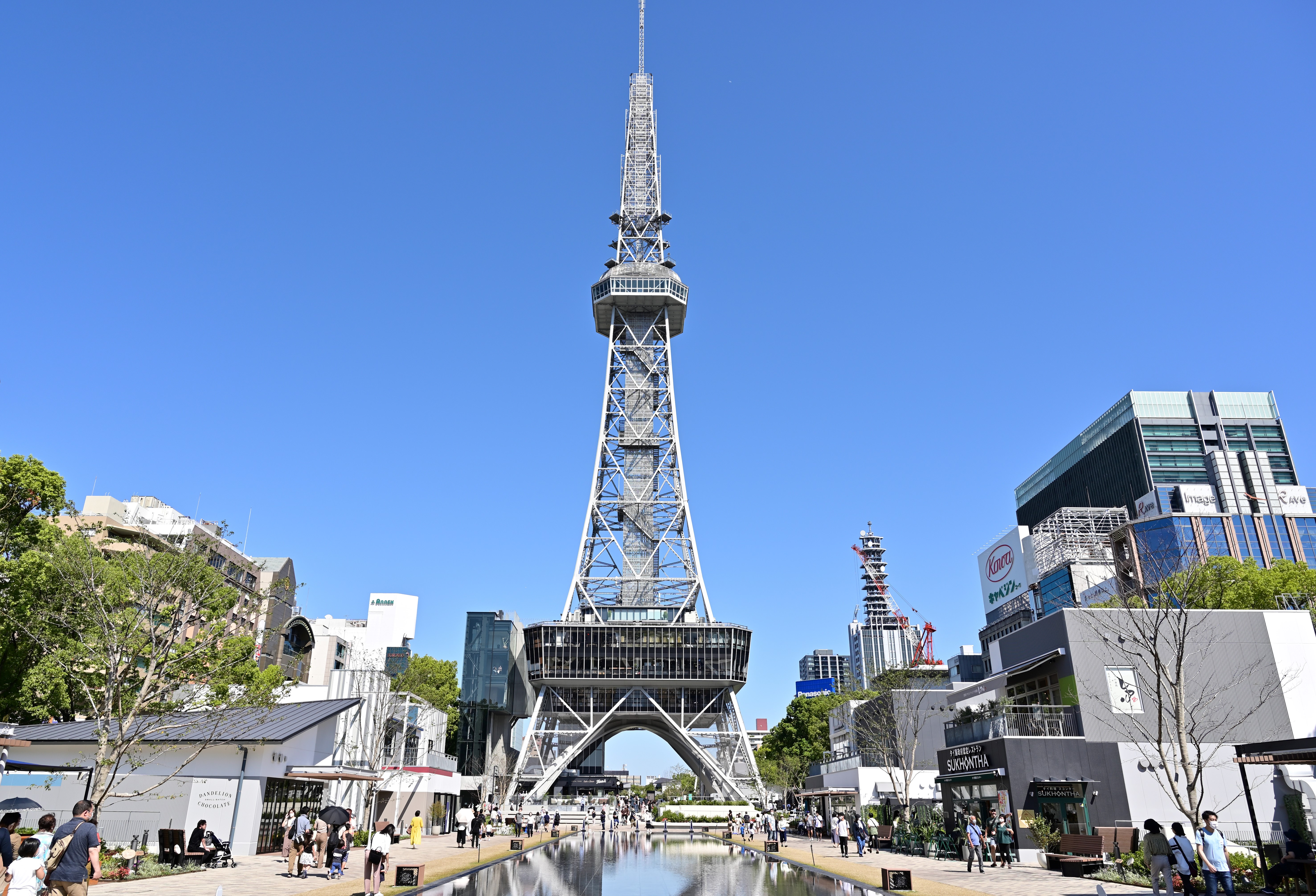
Nagoya City

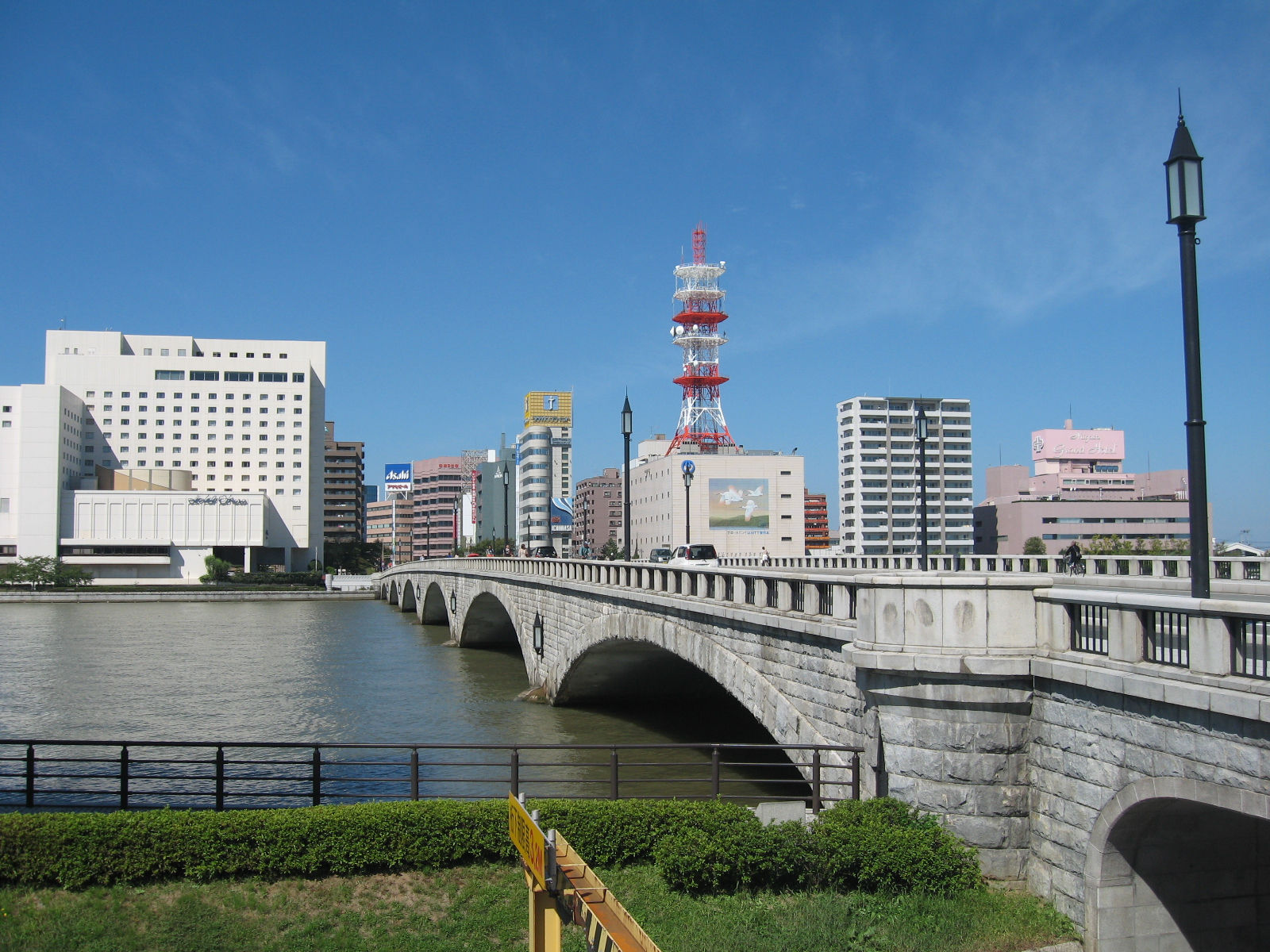
Niigata City

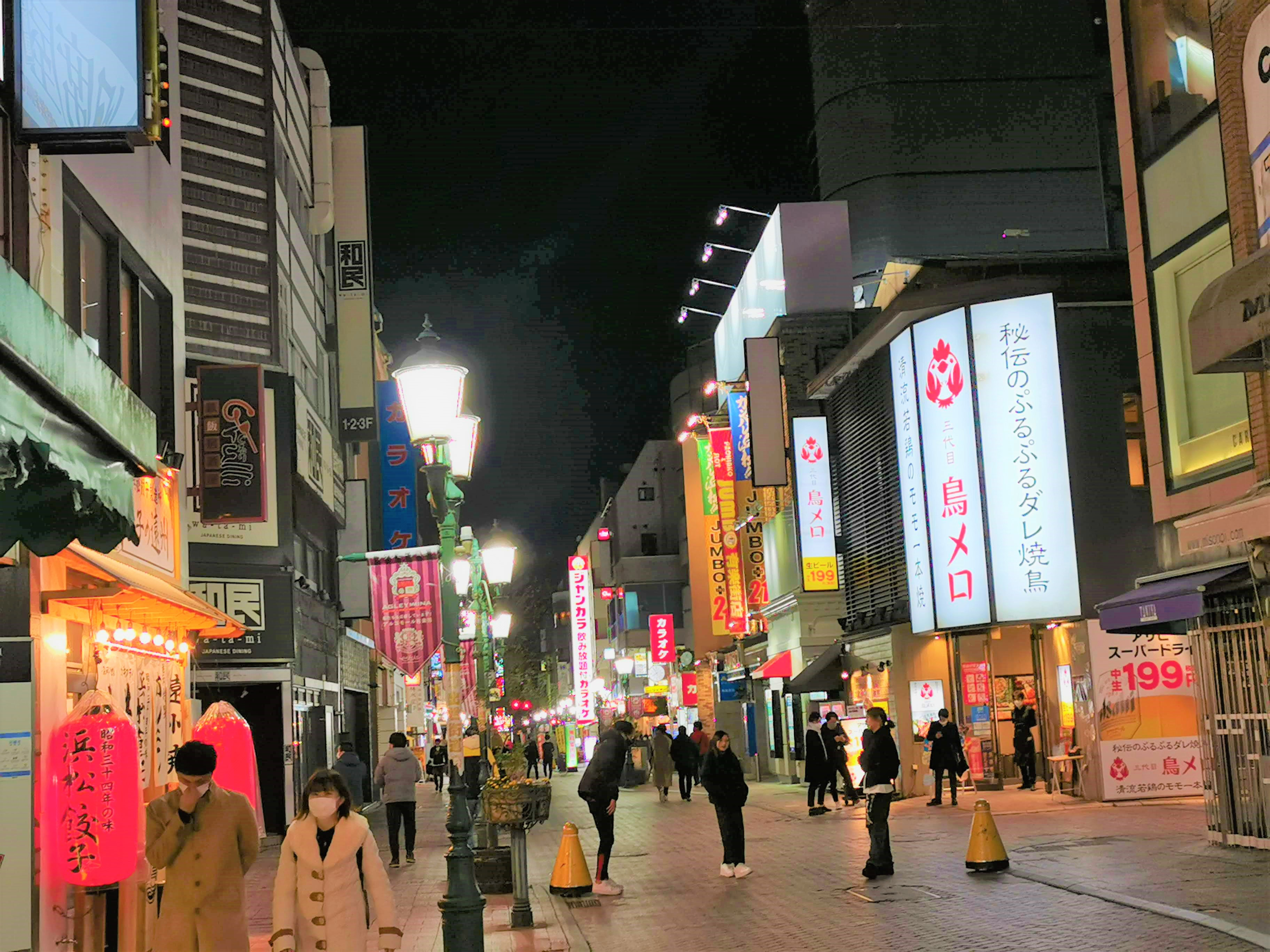
Hamamatsu City

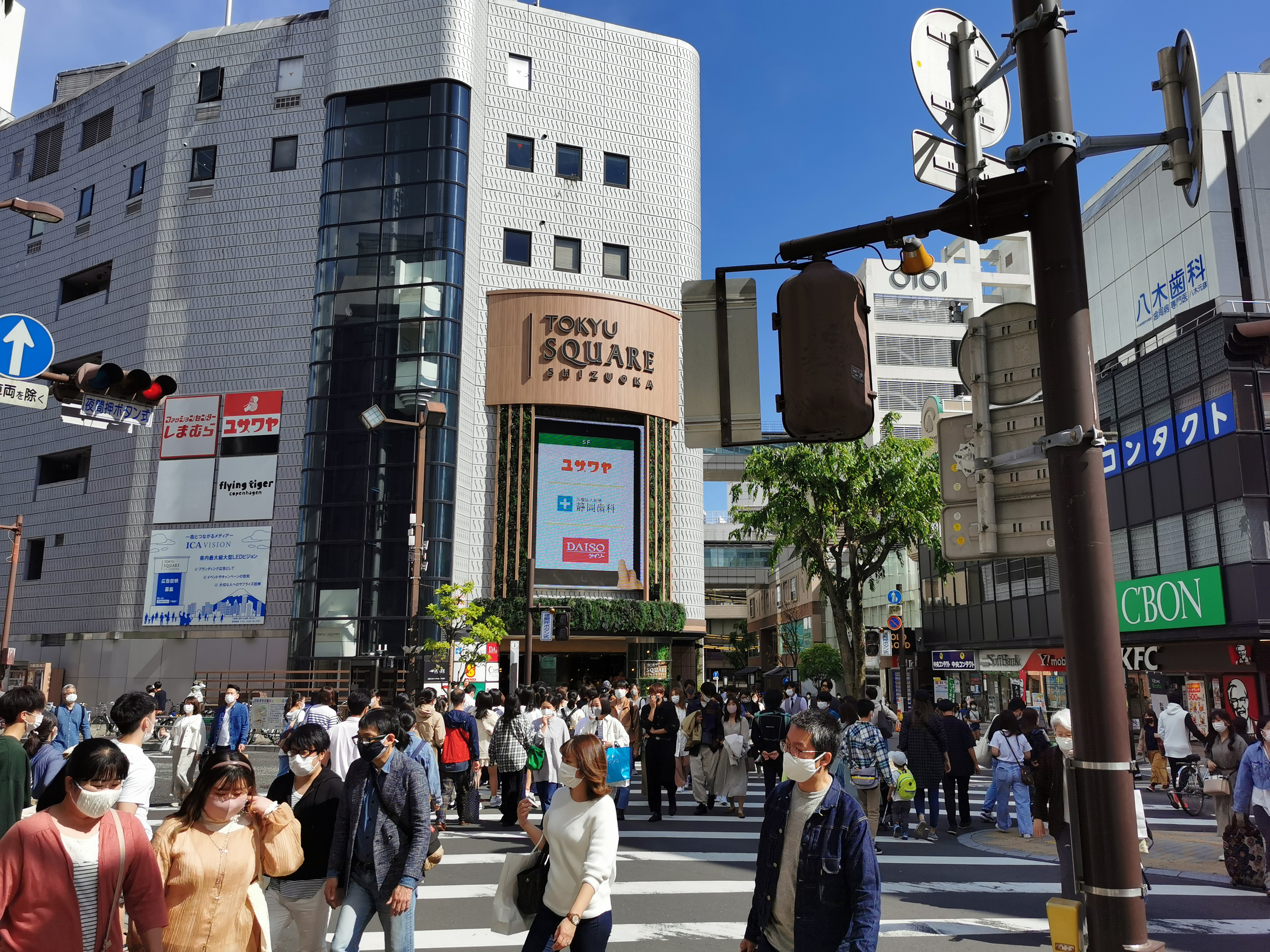
Shizuoka City

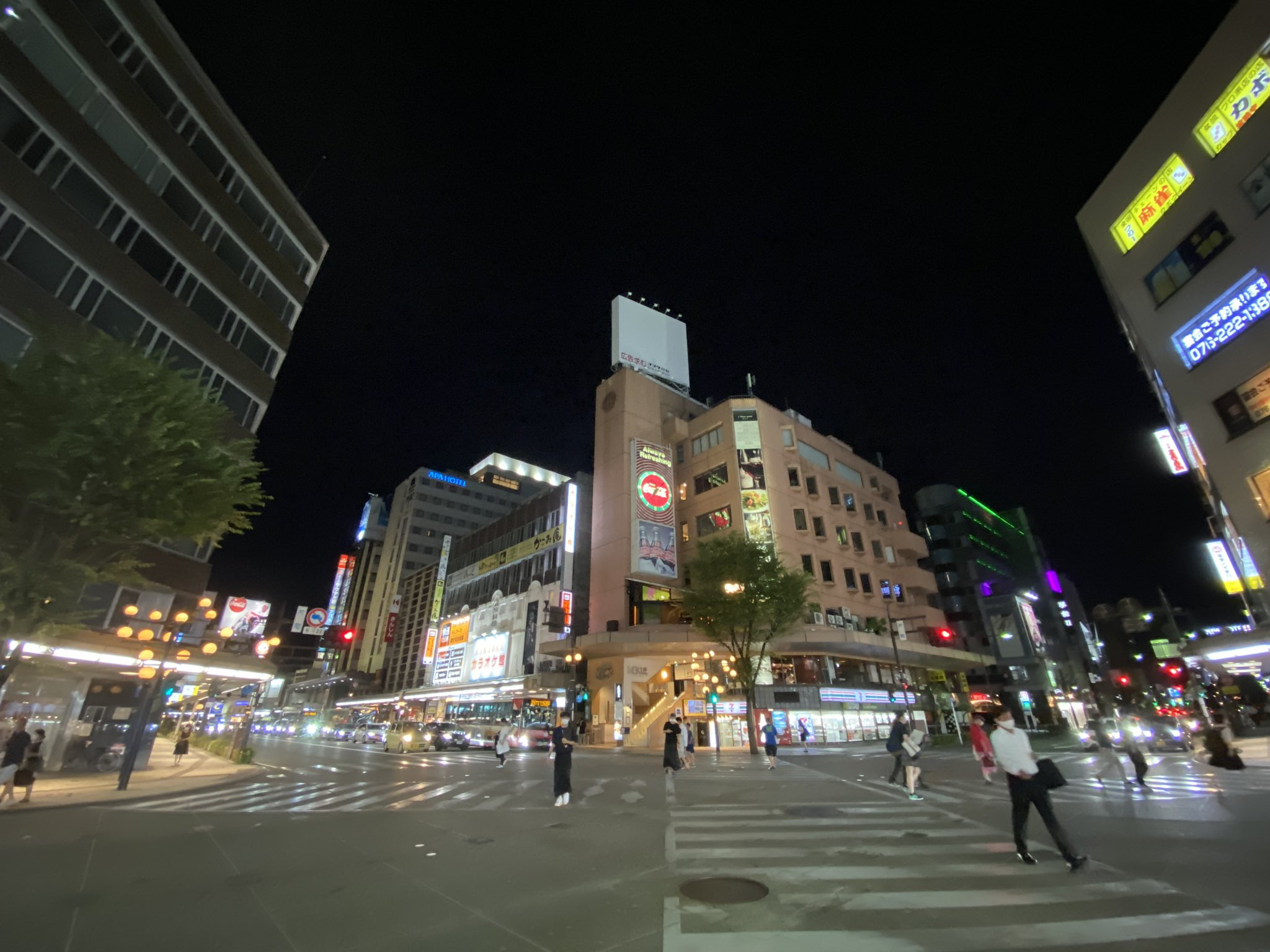
Kanazawa City

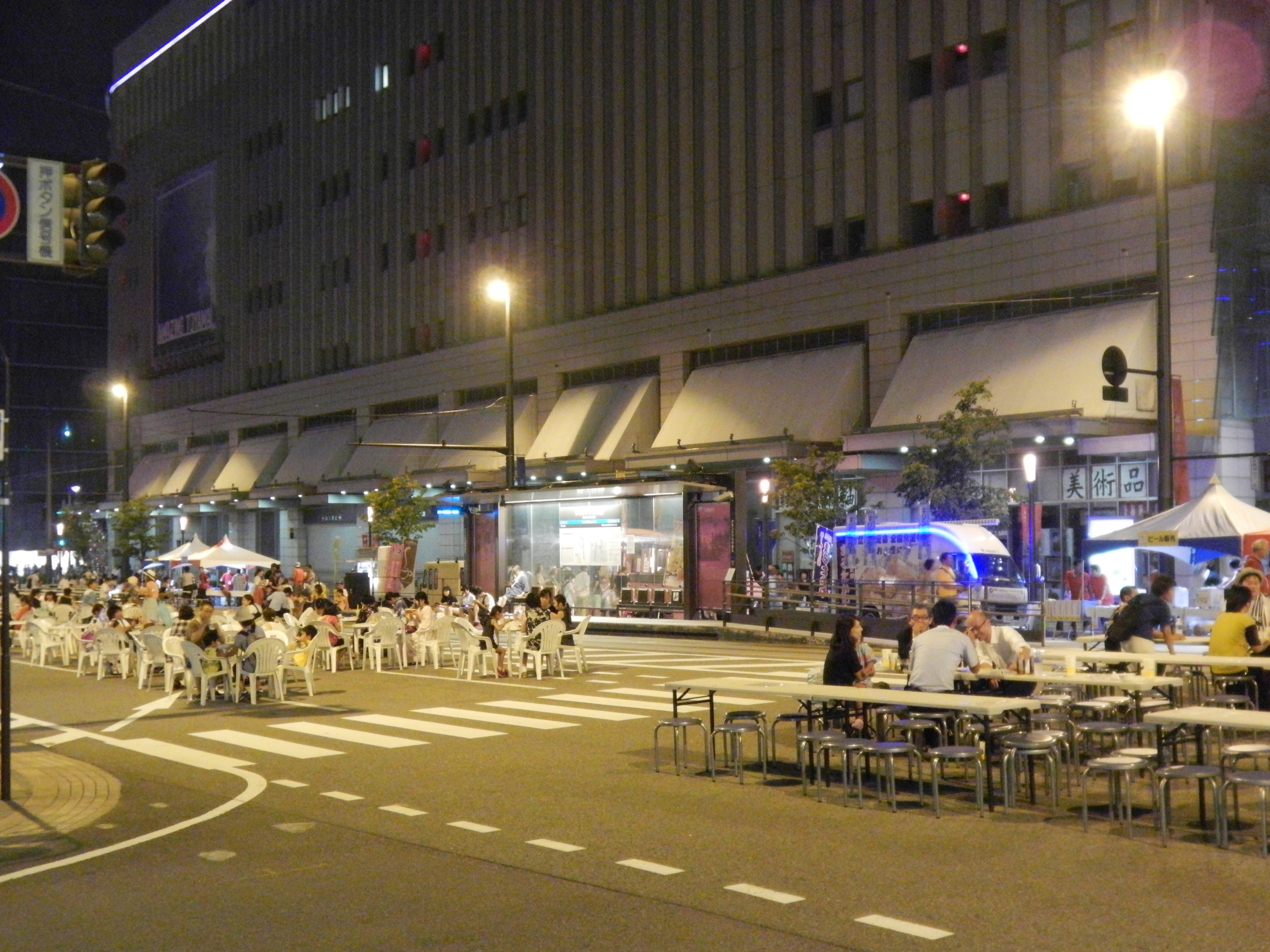
Toyama City

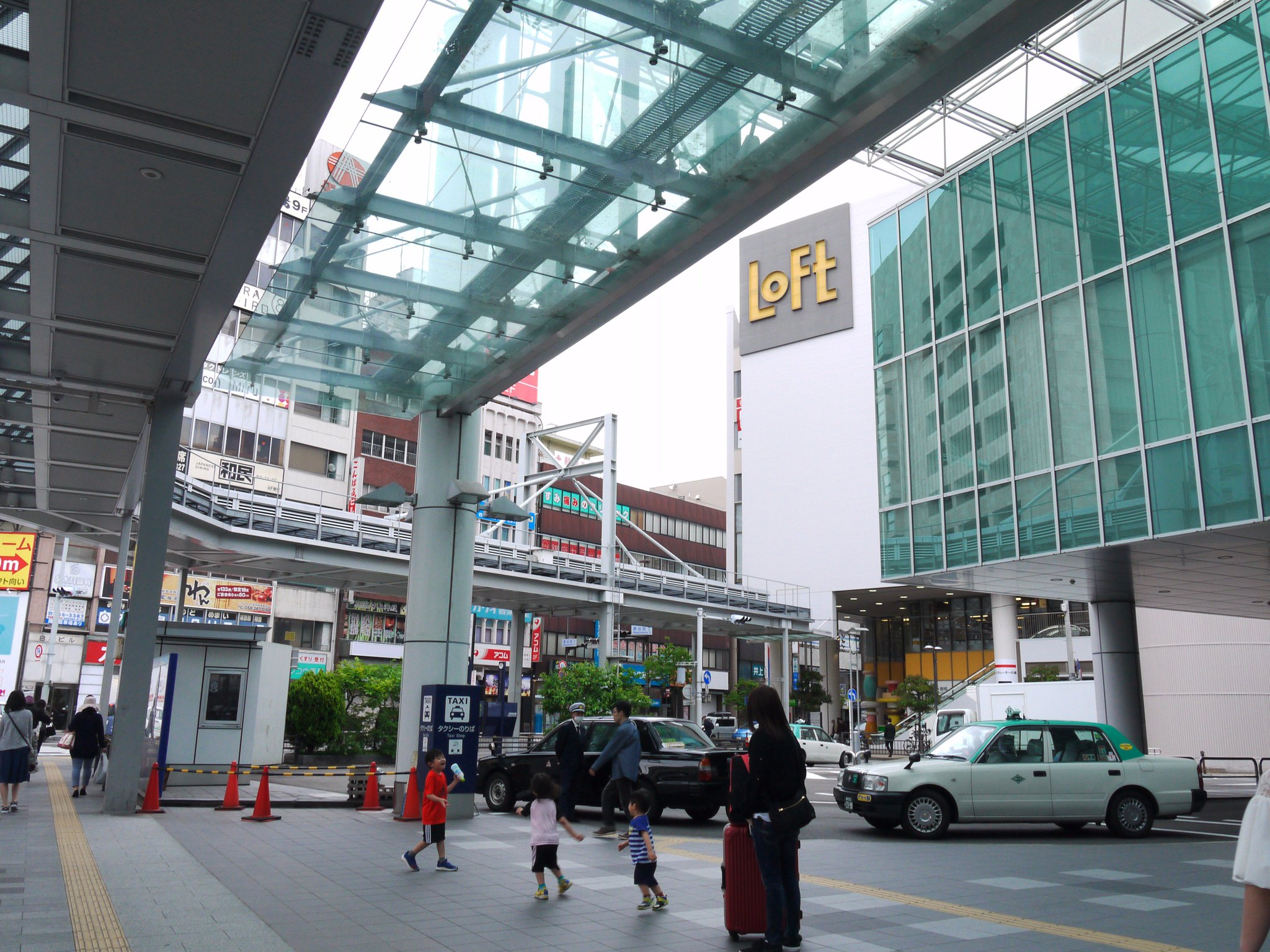
Gifu City

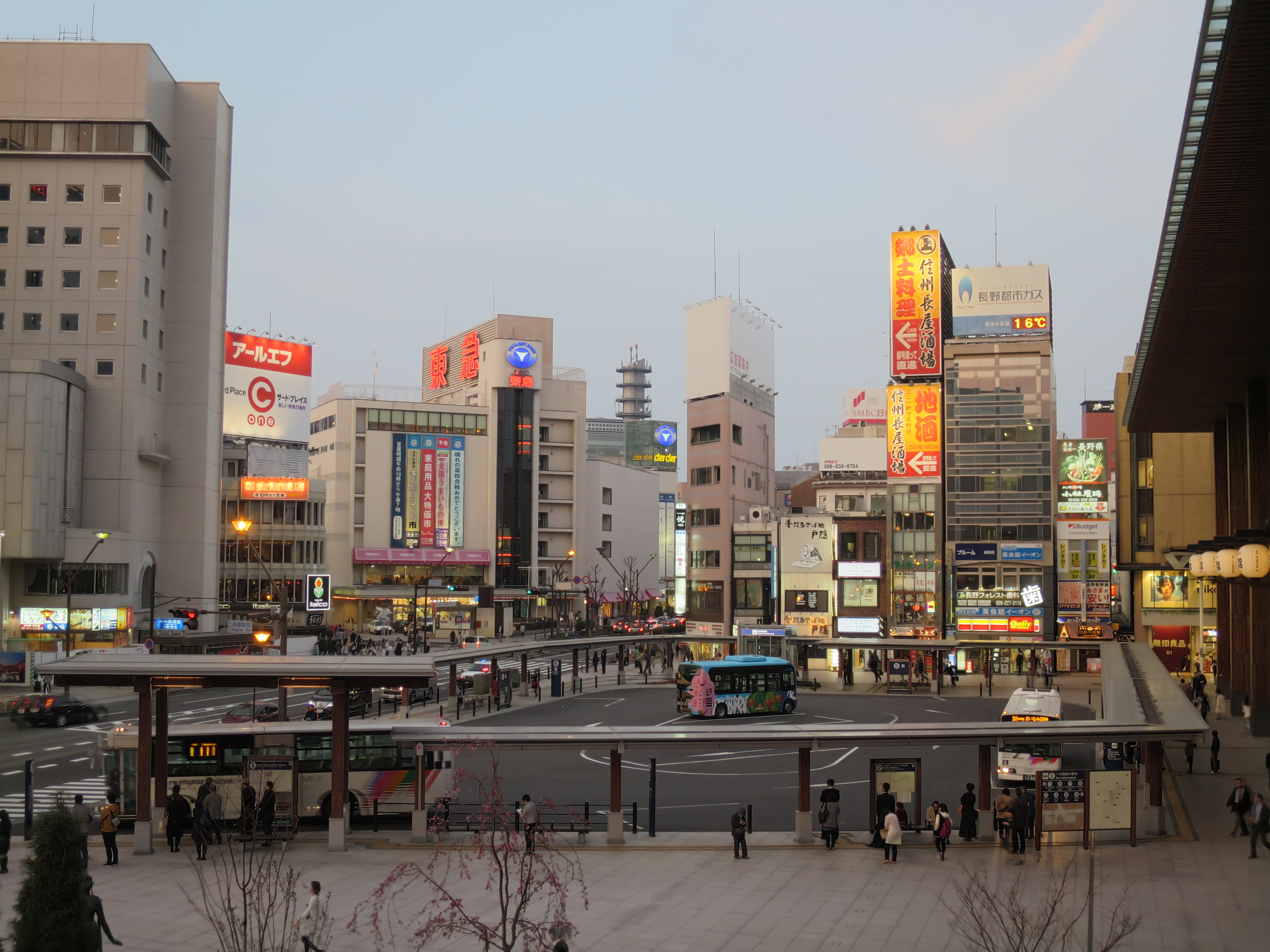
Nagano City

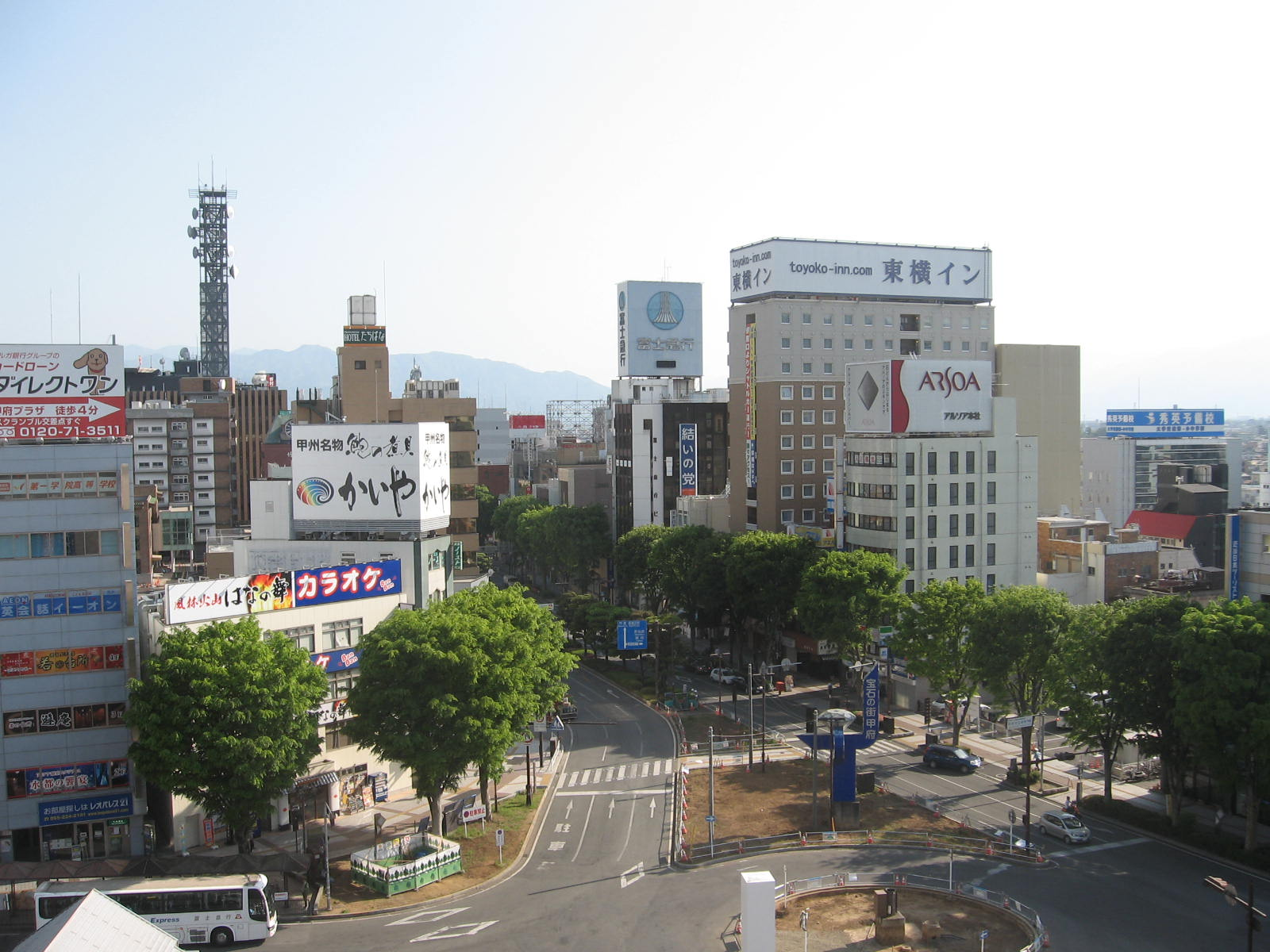
Kofu City

=== Other cities ===
- Fuji City: a special city
- Ichinomiya City: a special city
- Jōetsu City: a special city
- Kasugai City: a special city
- Matsumoto City: a core city
- Nagaoka City: a special city
- Numazu City: a special city
- Okazaki City: a core city
- Toyohashi City: a core city
- Toyota City: a core city
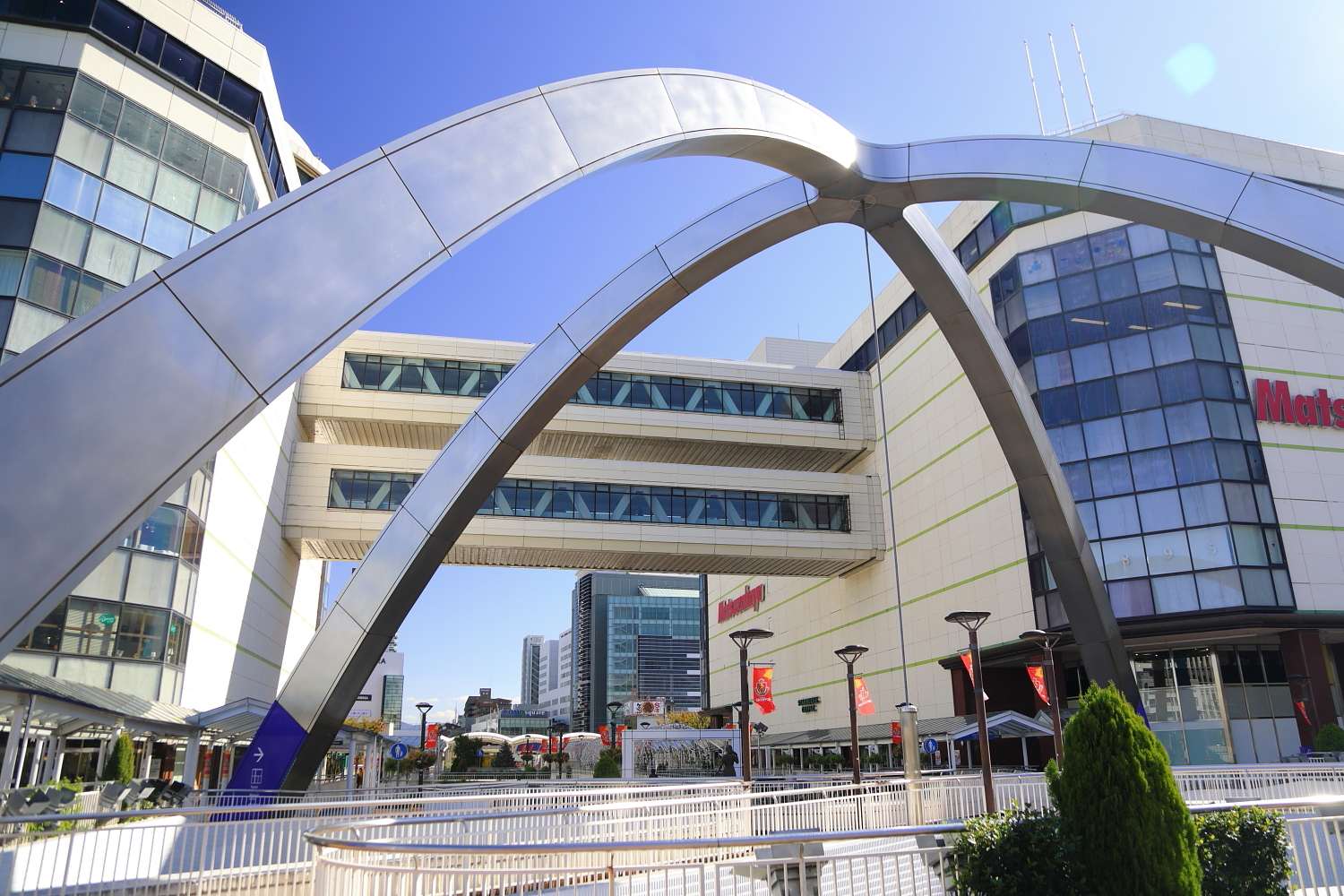
Toyota City

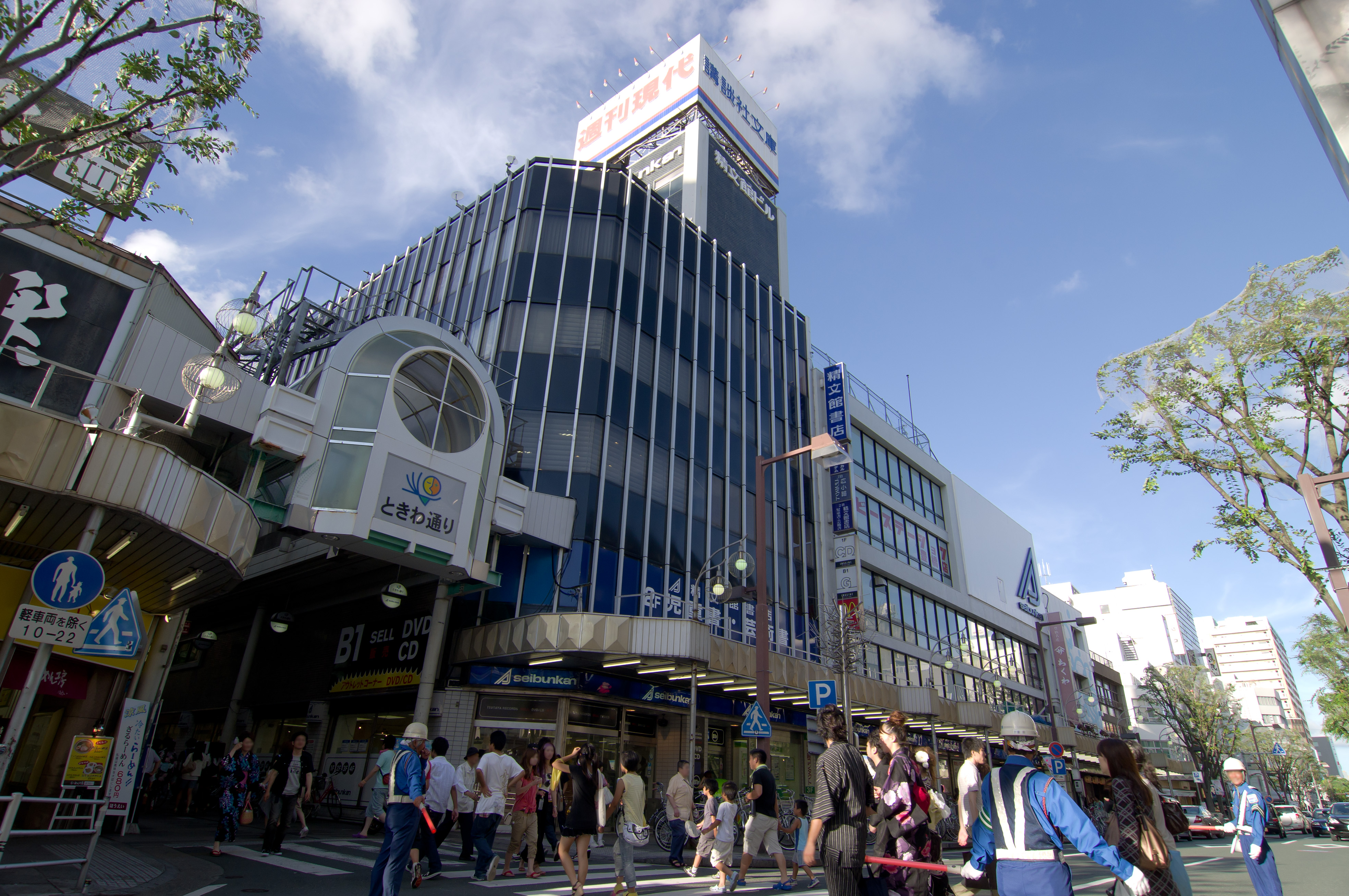
Toyohashi City

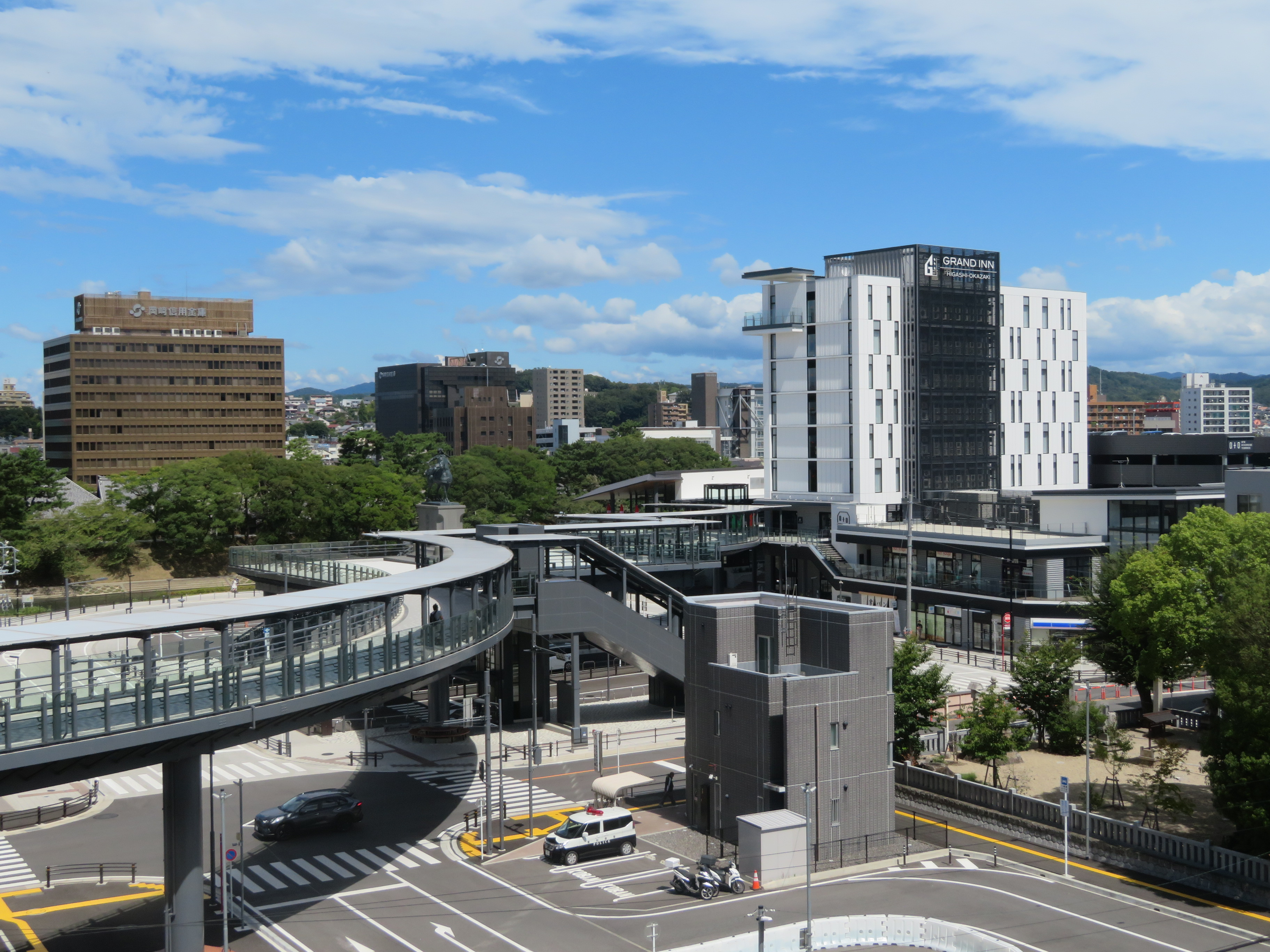
Okazaki City
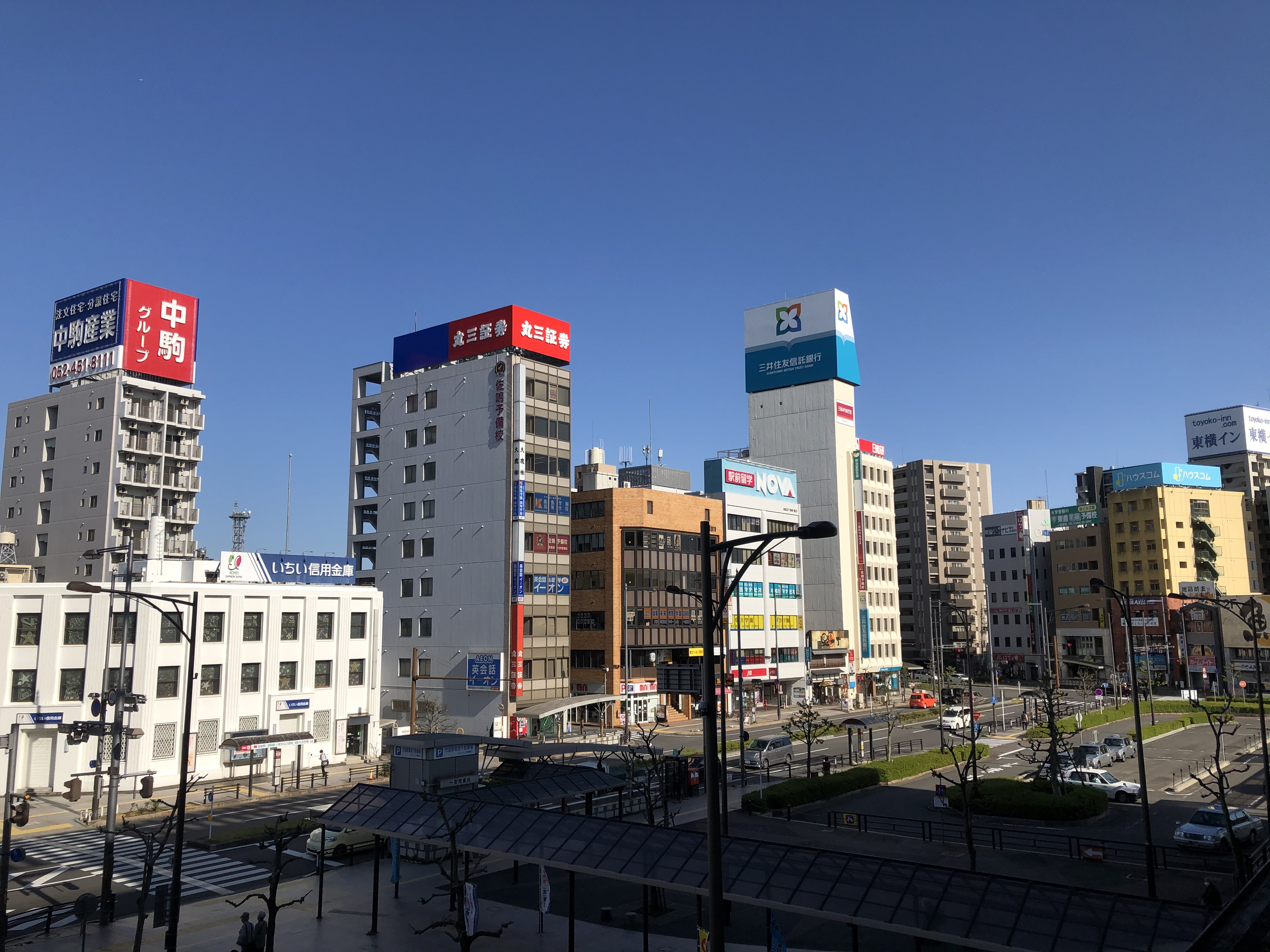
Ichinomiya City

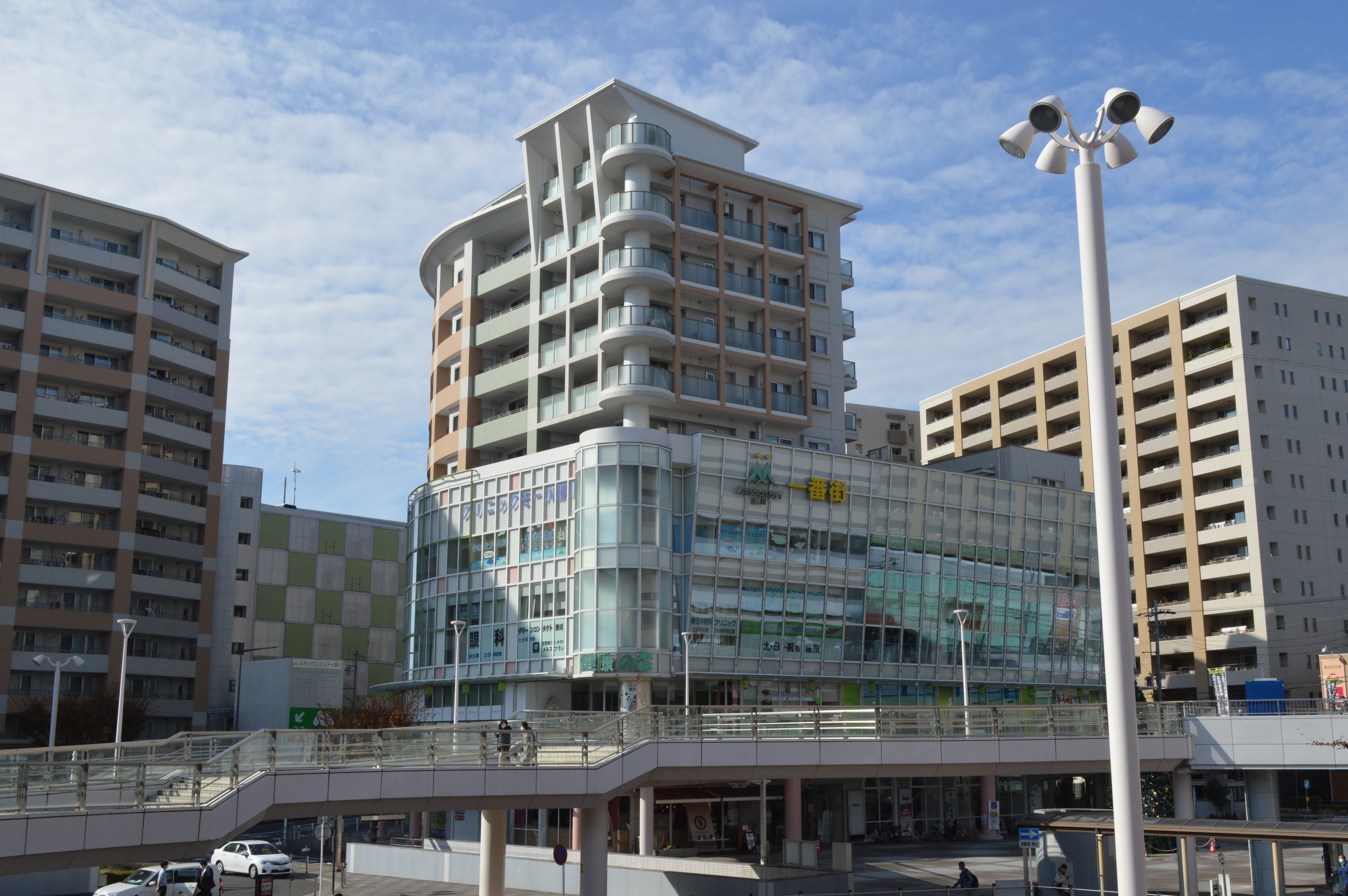
Kasugai City

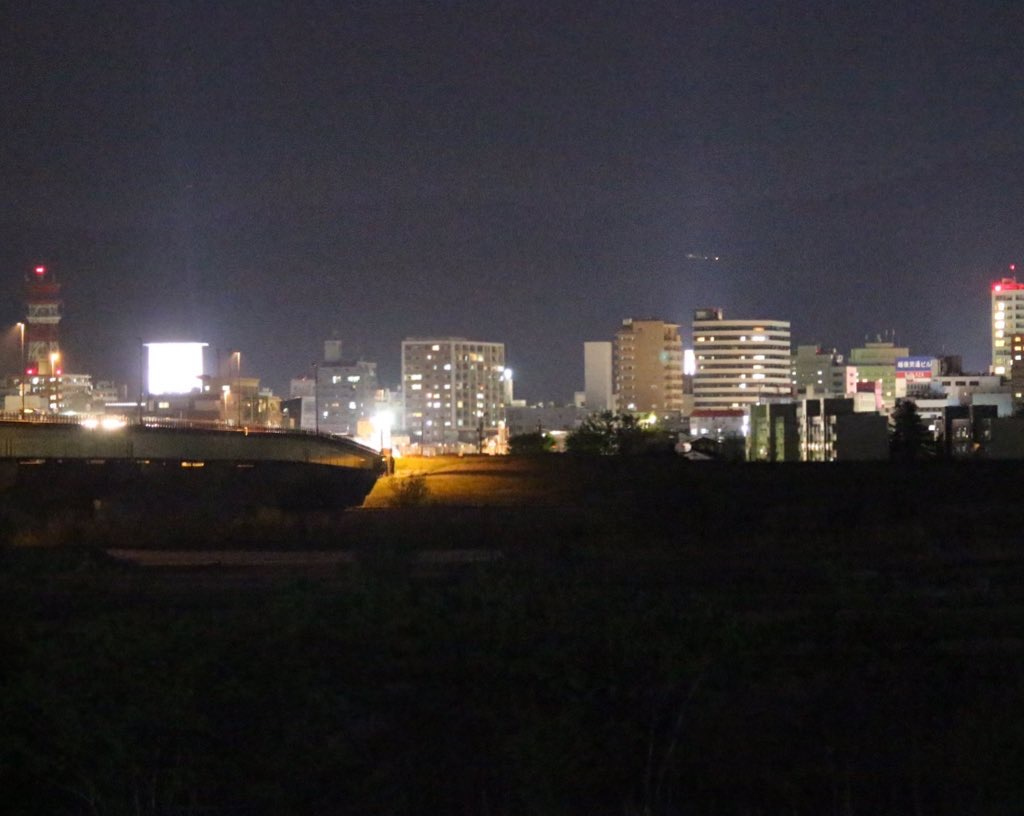
Nagaoka City

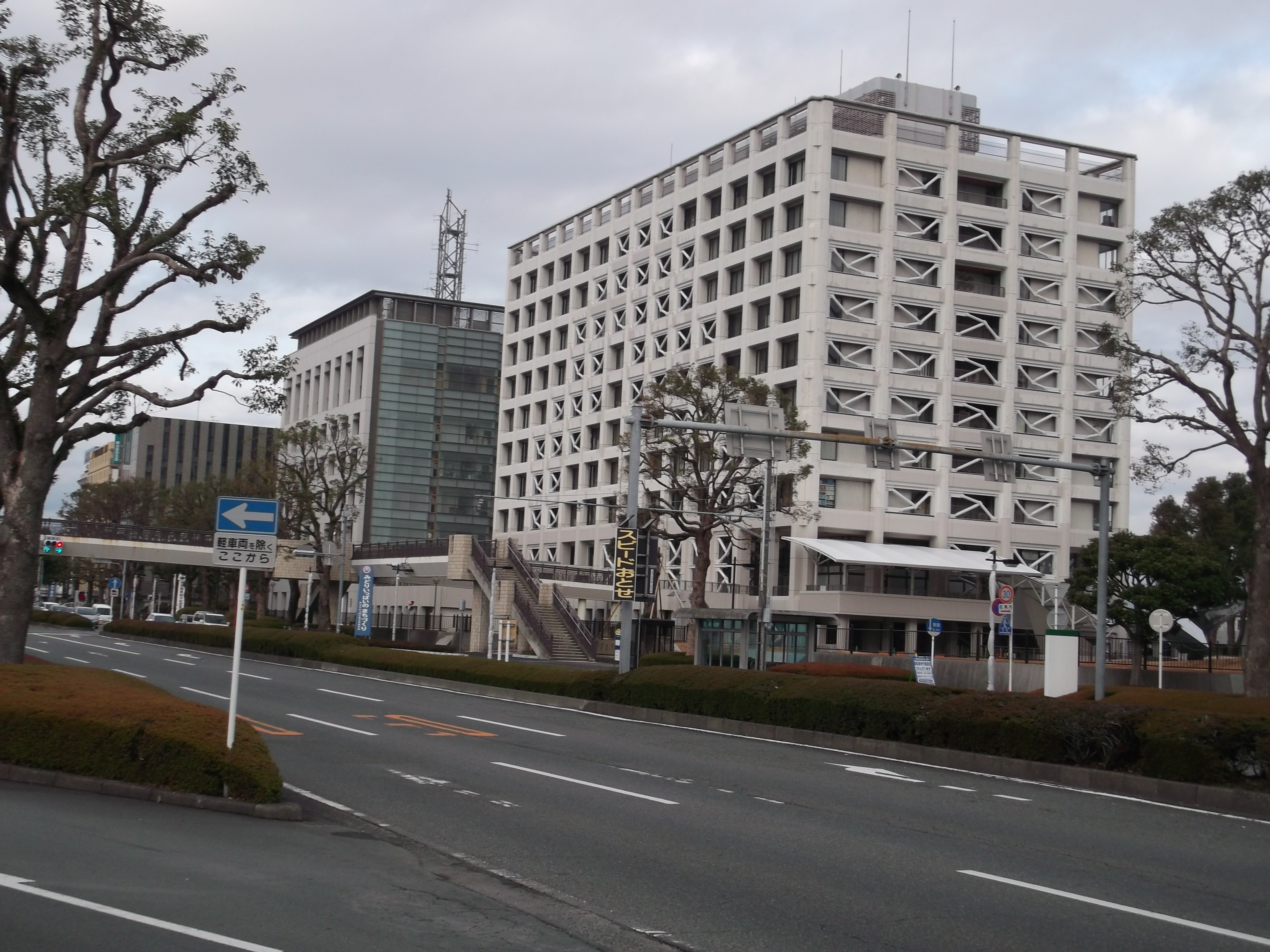
Fuji City

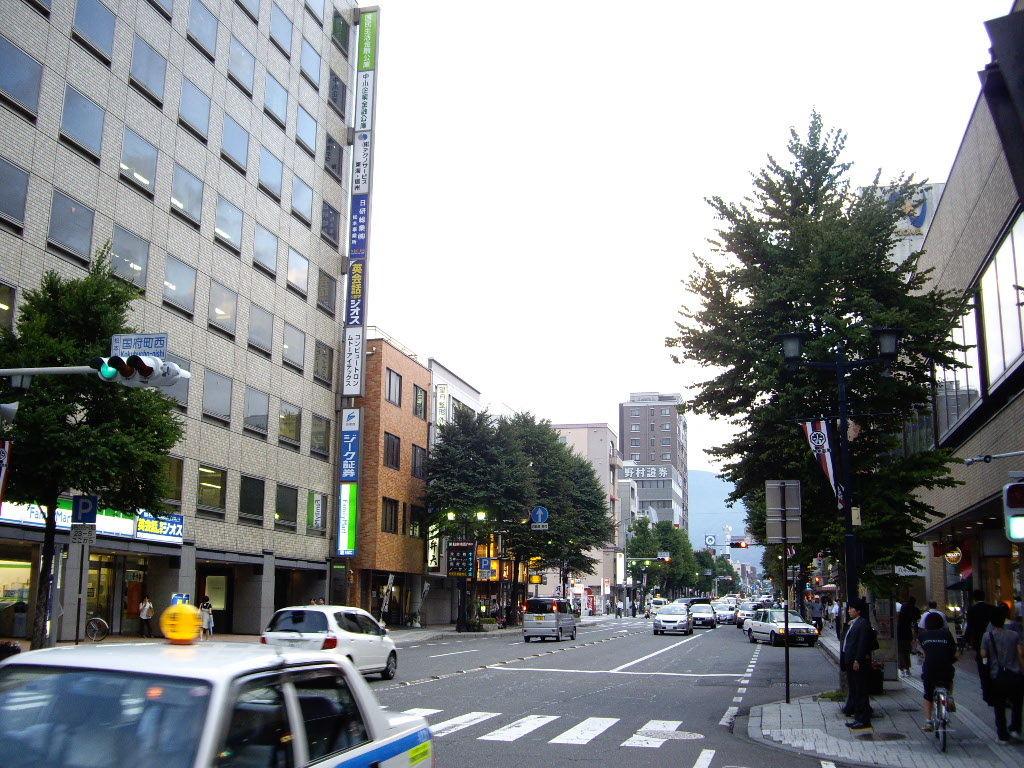
Matsumoto City

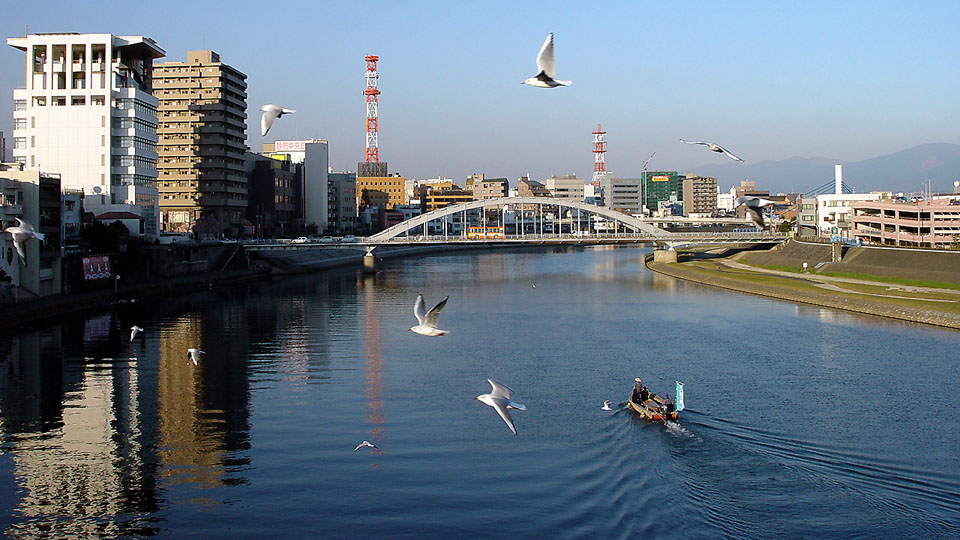
Numazu City

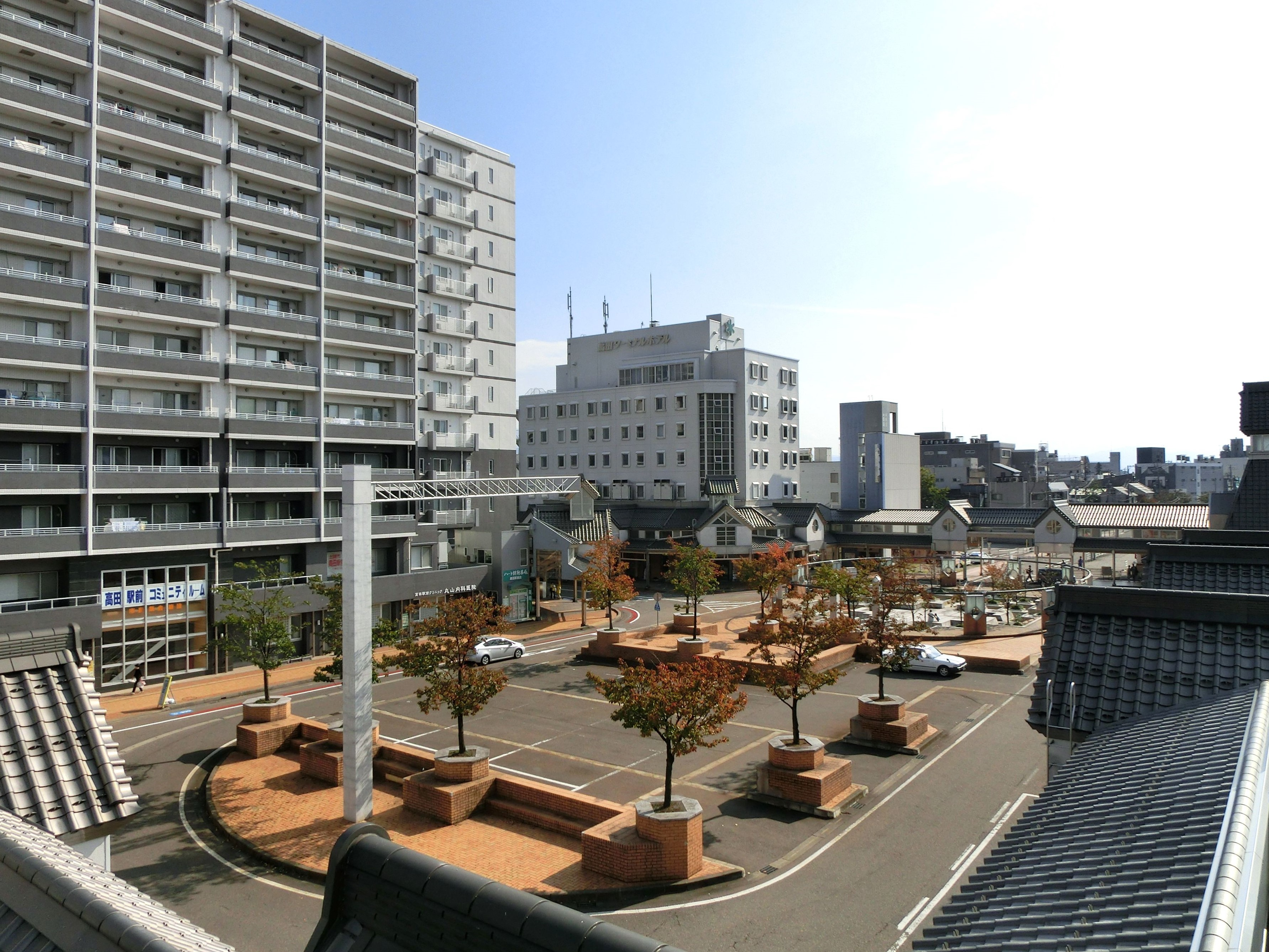
Jōetsu City

== See also ==
- Geography of Japan
- Hokuriku dialect
- List of regions of Japan
- Tōkai–Tōsan dialect

== Sources ==
- Nussbaum, Louis-Frédéric (2002 [1996]). Japan Encyclopedia. Trans. by Käthe Roth. Cambridge, Massachusetts: Harvard University Press. ISBN 0-674-01753-6, ISBN 978-0-674-01753-5. OCLC 58053128.
