= Groups of traditional buildings =

Category of Japanese historical buildings

Groups of traditional buildings (伝統的建造物群, Dentōteki Kenzōbutsu-gun) is a Japanese category of historic preservation introduced by a 1975 amendment of the law which mandates the protection of groups of traditional buildings which, together with their environment, form a beautiful scene. They can be post towns, castle towns, mining towns, merchant quarters, ports, farming or fishing villages, etc. The Japanese government's Agency for Cultural Affairs recognizes and protects the country's cultural properties under the Law for the Protection of Cultural Properties.

Municipalities can designate items of particular importance as preservation districts for groups of traditional buildings (伝統的建造物群保存地区, Dentōteki Kenzōbutsu-gun Hozon-chiku) and approve measures to protect them. Items of even higher importance are then designated important preservation districts for groups of traditional buildings (重要伝統的建造物群保存地区, Jūyō Dentōteki Kenzōbutsu-gun Hozon-chiku) by the central government. The Agency for Cultural Affairs then provides guidance, advice, and funds for repairs and other work. Additional support is given in the form of preferential tax treatment.

As of October 16, 2026, 131 districts have been classified as important preservation districts for groups of traditional buildings.

== List of Important Preservation Districts ==
=== Criteria ===
Important preservation districts for groups of traditional buildings are designated according to three criteria:

1. Groups of traditional buildings that show excellent design as a whole
2. Groups of traditional buildings and land distribution that preserve the old state of affairs well
3. Groups of traditional buildings and their surrounding environment that show remarkable regional characteristics

=== Statistics ===
Type	No. of Districts (Note: The total in this column is larger than the number of designated groups, because some of the designated properties belong to more than one type.)
Brewers town	4
Casters town	1
Castle town	4
Dyeing and weaving town	2
Farming village	5
Fishing village	3
Hot-spring town	1
Jinaimachi (Note: A jinai-machi, jinai-chō (寺内町) is an autonomous religious community that appeared in the Muromachi Period.)	2
Lacquerware town	1
Merchant quarter	29
Mining town	2
Mountain village	15
Porcelain-maker town	1
Port quarter	14
Post town	11
Salt works town	1
Sericulture community	5
Ship-owner quarter	2
Shrine quarter	1
Silk spinning town	1
Tea house quarter	3
Temple town	9
Textile town	1
Samurai quarter	14
Wax maker quarter	1
Zaigō town (Note: During the Edo period, zaigō towns (在郷町, zaigō-machi) were areas in the countryside where artisans and merchants lived under the administration of a nearby village's magistrate (bugyō).)	13

Prefecture	City	No. of Districts
Aichi	Nagoya	1
Aichi	Toyota	1
Akita	Semboku	1
Akita	Yokote	1
Aomori	Hirosaki	1
Aomori	Kuroishi	1
Chiba	Katori	1
Ehime	Seiyo	1
Ehime	Uchiko	1
Ehime	Tsushima	1
Fukui	Obama	1
Fukui	Wakasa	1
Fukui	Minamiechizen	1
Fukuoka	Asakura	1
Fukuoka	Ukiha	2
Fukuoka	Yame	2
Fukushima	Kitakata	1
Fukushima	Minamiaizu	1
Fukushima	Shimogō	1
Gifu	Ena	1
Gifu	Gujō	1
Gifu	Mino	1
Gifu	Shirakawa	1
Gifu	Takayama	2
Gunma	Kiryū	1
Gunma	Nakanojō	1
Hiroshima	Fukuyama	1
Hiroshima	Hatsukaichi	1
Hiroshima	Kure	1
Hiroshima	Takehara	1
Hokkaidō	Hakodate	1
Hyōgo	Kōbe	1
Hyōgo	Sasayama	2
Hyōgo	Tatsuno	1
Hyōgo	Toyooka	1
Hyōgo	Yabu	1
Ibaraki	Sakuragawa	1
Ishikawa	Hakusan	1
Ishikawa	Kaga	2
Ishikawa	Kanazawa	4
Ishikawa	Wajima	1
Iwate	Kanegasaki	1
Kagawa	Marugame	1
Kagoshima	Izumi	1
Kagoshima	Minamikyūshū	1
Kagoshima	Satsumasendai	1
Kagoshima	Minamisatsuma	1
Kōchi	Aki	1
Kōchi	Muroto	1
Kyoto	Ine	1
Kyoto	Kyoto	4
Kyoto	Maizuru	1
Kyoto	Nantan	1
Kyoto	Yosano	1
Mie	Kameyama	1
Miyagi	Murata	1
Miyazaki	Hyuga	1
Miyazaki	Nichinan	1
Miyazaki	Shiiba	1
Nagano	Chikuma	1
Nagano	Hakuba	1
Nagano	Nagiso	1
Nagano	Shiojiri	2
Nagano	Suzaka	1
Nagano	Togakushi	1
Nagano	Tōmi	1
Nagasaki	Hirado	1
Nagasaki	Nagasaki	2
Nagasaki	Unzen	1
Nara	Gojō	1
Nara	Kashihara	1
Nara	Uda	1
Niigata	Sado	2
Ōita	Hita	1
Ōita	Kitsuki	1
Okayama	Kurashiki	1
Okayama	Takahashi	1
Okayama	Tsuyama	2
Okayama	Yakage	1
Okinawa	Taketomi	1
Okinawa	Tonaki	1
Osaka	Tondabayashi	1
Saga	Arita	1
Saga	Kashima	2
Saga	Ureshino	1
Saitama	Kawagoe	1
Shiga	Higashiōmi	1
Shiga	Hikone	1
Shiga	Ōmihachiman	1
Shiga	Ōtsu	1
Shimane	Matsue	1
Shimane	Ōda	2
Shimane	Tsuwano	1
Shizuoka	Yaizu	1
Tochigi	Tochigi	1
Tokushima	Mima	1
Tokushima	Miyoshi	1
Tokushima	Mugi	1
Tottori	Daisen	1
Tottori	Kurayoshi	1
Tottori	Wakasa	1
Toyama	Nanto	2
Toyama	Takaoka	3
Wakayama	Yuasa	1
Yamaguchi	Hagi	4
Yamaguchi	Yanai	1
Yamanashi	Hayakawa	1
Yamanashi	Kōshū	1

=== Usage ===
The table's columns (except for Remarks and Images) are sortable by table headings. The following gives an overview of what is included in the table and how the sorting works.

- Name: name of the important preservation district as registered in the Database of National Cultural Properties
- Type: type of the district (samurai / merchant / tea house /... quarter, post town, mountain village, mine town,...)
- Criterion: number of the criterion under which the district is designated (see list of criteria above)
- Area: area covered
- Remarks: general remarks
- Location: "town-name prefecture-name"; The column entries sort as "prefecture-name town-name".
- Images: picture of the structure

=== List ===
Name	Type	Criterion	Area	Remarks	Location	Images
Motomachi and Suehiro-chō (函館市元町末広町, Hakodate-shi Motomachi Suehiro-chō)	port quarter	3	14.5 ha (36 acres)	Old Hakodate port area, which was among the first ports to be opened during the bakumatsu period at the end of the Tokugawa Shogunate. Due to a fire in the Meiji period, the district consists of a mix of western, Japanese, and eclectic style town houses, religious and community buildings from the Meiji to the early Shōwa period.	Hakodate, Hokkaidō; 41°45′56.7″N 140°42′45.02″E	Two joined red gabled brick houses with black roofs and entrances on the gable ends.
Nakachō (弘前市仲町, Hirosaki-shi Nakamachi)	samurai quarter	2	10.6 ha (26 acres)	Former samurai castle town of the Tsugaru Domain dating to the Keichō era (1596–1615) with principal houses, the front gate, sawara hedges and wooden fences.	Hirosaki, Aomori; 40°36′46.43″N 140°28′1.07″E	
Nakamachi (黒石市中町, Kuroishi-shi Nakamachi)	merchant quarter	1	3.1 ha (7.7 acres)	Merchant town and transportation center along the coastal road that prospered since the establishment of the Kuroishi Tsugaru family by Tsugaru Nobufusa in 1656.	Kuroishi, Aomori; 40°38′41.43″N 140°35′47.65″E	
Jōnai Suwa-kōji (金ケ崎町城内諏訪小路, Kanegasaki-chō Jōnai Suwa-kōji)	samurai quarter	2	34.8 ha (86 acres)	Samurai town at the order of the Date Domain established in strategic position on the Kitakami River with thatched houses and hedges.	Kanegasaki, Iwate; 39°11′48.32″N 141°7′19.36″E	—
Murata (村田町村田, Murata-machi Murata)	merchant quarter	1	7.4 ha (18 acres)	Trading center in Sennan (仙南) dealing in safflower during the Edo and in cocoons starting from the Meiji period.	Murata, Miyagi; 38°7′7.22″N 140°43′30.67″E	
Masuda (横手市増田, Yokote-shi Masuda)	zaigō town	2	10.6 ha (26 acres)	Edo period town noted for its uchigura, storage and community space that is incorporated into the building itself.	Yokote, Akita; 39°12′10.75″N 140°32′45.65″E	Decorated black door to a black structure.
Kakunodate (仙北市角館, Senboku-shi Kakunodate)	samurai quarter	2	6.9 ha (17 acres)	Large number of samurai residences, a front gate and wooden fences of a former castle town created by a branch of the Satake clan.	Semboku, Akita; 39°35′37.67″N 140°33′55.87″E	A street lined by wooden plank fences and small wooden gates.
Ōuchi-juku (下郷町大内宿, Shimogō-machi Ōuchi-juku)	post town	3	11.3 ha (28 acres)	Part of the Aizu Nishi Kaidō. Consisting of about 450 m (1,480 ft) road lined by large equally spaced thatched wooden buildings.	Shimogō, Fukushima; 37°20′1.68″N 139°51′39.91″E	Street lined by similar wooden houses with white walls and thatched roofs.
Maezawa (南会津町前沢, Minamiaizu-machi Maezawa)	mountain village	3	13.3 ha (33 acres)	Village built from the late Meiji to the early Shōwa period with thatched houses in the chūmon style. (Note: (chūmon-zukuri, 中門造): a type of minka, vernecular house, with one or more wings projecting at right angles from the main house)	Minamiaizu, Fukushima; 37°6′7.88″N 139°31′11.4″E	
Otazuki (喜多方市小田付, kitakata-shi otazuki)	zaigō town and brewers quarter	2	15.5 ha (38 acres)	Developed as a market town in 1582, in recent times brewing of sake, soy sauce and miso was practiced.	Kitakata, Fukushima; 37°39′10.98″N 139°52′49.99″E	—
Makabe (桜川市真壁, Sakuragawa-shi Makabe)	zaigō town	2	17.6 ha (43 acres)	Town appeared around Makabe Castle in the Sengoku period and was further developed by the Kasama clan during the Edo period. Japanese and western style town houses from the Edo period from after a Tenpō era (1830–1844) fire remain. Plots are fenced in with a yakuimon (Note: (yakuimon, 薬医門): a gate with a gabled roof, two square or rectangular main posts and two square or circular secondary posts) providing access and some town houses feature a sodegura (Note: (sodegura, 袖蔵): a type of storehouse flanking the main shop with the roofs at right angles to the main building)storehouse.	Makabe, Sakuragawa, Ibaraki; 36°16′38.03″N 140°6′6.86″E	A traditional Japanese style hotel in Makabe.
Kauemon-chō (栃木市嘉右衛門町, Tochigi-shi Kauemon-chō)	zaigō town	2	9.6 ha (24 acres)	Residential and storehouses from the end of the Edo period onward, that formed alongside the Nikkō Reiheishi Kaidō.	Tochigi, Tochigi; 36°23′14.85″N 139°44′3.84″E	
Kiryū Shin Machi (桐生市桐生新町, Kiryū-shi Kiryū Shin Machi)	weaving town	2	13.4 ha (33 acres)	Edo period rural market town with machiya and textile related storehouses laid out along a main street.	Kiryū, Gunma; 36°25′0.39″N 139°20′30.28″E	
Kuni-Akaiwa (中之条町六合赤岩, Nakanojō-machi Kuni Akaiwa)	mountain village and sericulture community	3	63.0 ha (156 acres)	Meiji era sericulture farming village noted for its two or three-storied buildings. Component of The Tomioka Silk Mill and Related Industrial Heritage.	Nakanojō, Gunma; 36°34′30.8″N 138°37′41.34″E	
Kawagoe (川越市川越, Kawagoe-shi Kawagoe)	merchant quarter	1	7.8 ha (19 acres)	Machiya and storehouses from after a great fire in 1893 and post Taishō period western style buildings.	Kawagoe, Saitama; 35°55′23.18″N 139°28′58.57″E	A black two-storied house with hip-and gable roof and a pent roof on the first storey.
Sawara (香取市佐原, Katori-shi Sawara)	merchant quarter	3	7.1 ha (18 acres)	River port prospering from the Edo to the Taishō period with a variety of town houses, storehouses and western style architecture.	Katori, Chiba; 35°53′25.11″N 140°29′52.39″E	A small street and wooden houses next to a canal.
Ogi (佐渡市小木町, sadoshi ogimachi)	port quarter	2	13.3 ha (33 acres)	Port city founded in the 17th century to ship gold and silver.	Ogi, Sado, Niigata; 37°49′0.72″N 138°16′36.47″E	
Shukunegi (佐渡市宿根木, Sado-shi Shukunegi)	port quarter	3	28.5 ha (70 acres)	Edo period boat builder and ship owner quarter of dense two-story houses that look plain from the outside with luxurious interior.	Sado, Niigata; 37°48′25.04″N 138°14′36.71″E	
Kanaya-machi (高岡市金屋町, Takaoka-shi Kanaya-machi)	casters town	1	6.4 ha (16 acres)	Town houses, storehouses and workshops of a metal caster community that formed around Takaoka Castle.	Takaoka, Toyama; 36°45′2.47″N 137°0′21.18″E	Street with traditional Japanese wooden houses.
Yamachō-suji (高岡市山町筋, Takaoka-shi Yamachō-suji)	merchant quarter	1	5.5 ha (14 acres)	Traditional buildings from the Meiji to the early Shōwa period, such as: storehouses, town houses, western style buildings and rick structures.	Takaoka, Toyama; 36°44′49.49″N 137°0′39.22″E	Street with old storehouses.
Yoshihisa (高岡市吉久, Takaoka-shi Yoshihisa)	zaigō town	2	4.1 ha (10 acres)	Established in 1655, Yoshihisa prospered as a rice distribution center of the Kaga Domain.	Takaoka, Toyama; 36°46′48.85″N 137°3′24.34″E	Street with traditional wooden houses in winter.
Suganuma (南砺市菅沼, Nanto-shi Suganuma)	mountain village	3	4.4 ha (11 acres)	Village with 9 gasshō-zukuri houses and itakura (板倉) store houses. Part of the World Heritage Site Historic Villages of Shirakawa-gō and Gokayama	Nanto, Toyama; 36°24′15.74″N 136°53′11.77″E	Wooden thatched houses in a mountainous landscape.
Ainokura (南砺市相倉, Nanto-shi Ainokura)	mountain village	3	18 ha (44 acres)	Village with 20 gasshō-zukuri houses and itakura (板倉) store houses. Part of the World Heritage Site Historic Villages of Shirakawa-gō and Gokayama	Nanto, Toyama; 36°25′34.35″N 136°56′8.78″E	Wooden thatched houses and rice field in a mountainous landscape.
Kaga-hashidate (加賀市加賀橋立, Kaga-shi Kaga-hashidate)	ship-owner quarter	2	11 ha (27 acres)	Residences of ship owners and boatsmen of kitamaebune ships which were active from about the late Edo to the mid Meiji period.	Kaga, Ishikawa; 36°21′1.49″N 136°18′33.8″E	A large house beyond a wall.
Kaga-higashitani (加賀市加賀東谷, Kaga-shi Kaga-higashitani)	mountain village	3	151.8 ha (375 acres)	Four charcoal maker villages that prospered from early modern times to the early Shōwa period.	Kaga, Ishikawa; 36°14′17.2″N 136°26′34.75″E	—
Utatsu-sanroku (金沢市卯辰山麓, Kanazawa-shi Utatsu-sanroku)	temple town	2	22.1 ha (55 acres)	Neighborhood that developed along the approach roads (sandō) between the Hokkoku Kaidō and temples or shrines.	Kanazawa, Ishikawa; 36°34′28.1″N 136°40′9.71″E	
Teramachi-dai (金沢市寺町台, Kanazawa-shi Tera-machi-dai)	temple town	2	22 ha (54 acres)	Temple town formed in early modern times along the Noda and Tsurugi roads. Myōryū-ji, popularly known as Ninja-dera ("Ninja temples") is located here.	Kanazawa, Ishikawa; 36°33′7.44″N 136°39′0.96″E	Temples along a street.
Kazue-machi (金沢市主計町, Kanazawa-shi Kazue-machi)	tea house quarter	1	0.6 ha (1.5 acres)	Tea house neighborhood that developed from the late Edo to the early Shōwa period with tall two-storied houses to which in recent times a third level has been added. The site is said to have been the residence of a Kaga Domain deputy, giving the district its name.	Kanazawa, Ishikawa; 36°34′20.23″N 136°39′48.2″E	Houses along a riverfront.
Higashiyama-higashi (金沢市東山ひがし, Kanazawa-shi Higashiyama-higashi)	tea house quarter	1	1.8 ha (4.4 acres)	Tea house neighborhood with two-storied houses that was created in 1820 by moving buildings from central Kanazawa.	Kanazawa, Ishikawa; 36°34′21.64″N 136°40′1.33″E	Small street lined by wooden two-storeyed houses.
Kuroshima district (輪島市黒島地区, Wajima-shi kuroshima-chiku)	ship-owner quarter	2	20.5 ha (51 acres)	Early 16th century settlement that grew with the development of the shipping industry in the Sea of Japan during the Edo period. The district contains residences of ship-owners and sailors, temples, shrines, storehouses and gardens.	Wajima, Ishikawa; 37°16′53.96″N 136°44′4.39″E	Wooden and black tile-roofed ship-owner houses.
Shiramine (白山市白峰, Hakusan-shi Shiramine)	sericulture community	3	10.7 ha (26 acres)	Sericultrue village in a narrow valley location.	Hakusan, Ishikawa; 36°10′28.88″N 136°37′33.52″E	Street with two-storied wooden houses.
Kumagawa-juku (若狭町熊川宿, Wakasa-chō Kumagawajuku)	post town	3	10.8 ha (27 acres)	Located on the Saba Kaidō, which connected Wakasa Province with the capital in Kyoto.	Wakasa, Fukui; 35°26′36.85″N 135°54′5.33″E	Two-storeyed houses whose ground floor is occupied by shops next to small street and stream.
Obama-nishigumi (小浜市小浜西組, Obama-shi Obama-nishigumi)	merchant and tea house quarter	2	19.1 ha (47 acres)	Merchant houses and tea houses in an old port town that served as a relay point for goods from the Japan Sea side to Kyoto.	Obama, Fukui; 35°29′32.05″N 135°44′13.69″E	
Imajō (南越前町今庄宿, Minamiechizen-chō Imajō)	post town	2	9.2 ha (23 acres)		Minamiechizen, Fukui; 35°46′25.29″N 136°11′47.08″E	—
Kamijō Shimo-odawara Enzan (甲州市塩山下小田原上条, Kōshū-shi Enzan Shimo-odawara Kamijō)	mountain village and sericulture community	3	15.1 ha (37 acres)	Dry field farming village during the Edo period that turned into silk farming in the mid Meiji period. To accommodate the silk worm culture, the central part of the roof was raised.	Kōshū, Yamanashi; 35°44′14.99″N 138°46′14.65″E	Old silk-raising farmer houses with a unique shape roof.
Akazawa (早川町赤沢, Hayakawa-chō Akazawa)	mountain village, post town for pilgrims	3	25.6 ha (63 acres)	Lodgings for pilgrims going to Kuon-ji, head temple of Nichiren-shū. Located between Mount Shichimen and the temple's sacred mountain, Mount Minobu.	Hayakawa, Yamanashi; 35°23′50.74″N 138°22′39.08″E	
Narai (塩尻市奈良井, Shiojiri-shi Narai)	post town	3	17.6 ha (43 acres)	Post station of the Nakasendō and largest of the Kisoji with buildings from the Edo until the Meiji period.	Shiojiri, Nagano; 35°57′53.84″N 137°48′39.05″E	Small street lined by wooden two-storeyed houses.
Kiso-Hirasawa (塩尻市木曾平沢, Shiojiri-shi Kiso-hirasawa)	lacquerware town	2	12.5 ha (31 acres)	Town houses and storehouse where Kiso lacquerware continues to be produced by traditional methods.	Shiojiri, Nagano; 35°58′49.48″N 137°49′55.6″E	Small street lined by wooden two-storeyed houses.
Inariyama (千曲市稲荷山, Chikuma-shi Inariyama)	merchant quarter	2	13 ha (32 acres)	Originally founded during the Tenshō era as a castle town, Inariyama became a post station after the castle was abandoned in the Keichō era. Commercialization started in the 19th century and it turned into a distribution center for raw silk and textile products at the start of modern Japan.	Chikuma, Nagano; 36°32′11.62″N 138°6′16.8″E	
Togakushi (長野市戸隠, Nagano-shi Togakushi)	temple lodging (shukubo), temple town	2	73.3 ha (181 acres)	Shukubo temple lodgings and houses of lay devotees around the lower and middle shrine of Togakushi Shrine.	Togakushi, Nagano; 36°44′10.13″N 138°4′55.23″E	—
Unno-juku (東御市海野宿, Tōmi-shi Unno-juku)	post town and sericulture community	1	13.2 ha (33 acres)	Post station on the Hokkoku Kaidō established in 1625. From the Meiji period, the spacious rooms have been reused for silk farming.	Tōmi, Nagano; 36°21′42.97″N 138°18′46.99″E	Small street lined by wooden two-storeyed houses.
Tsumago-juku (南木曽町妻籠宿, Nagiso-machi Tsumago-juku)	post town	3	1,245.4 ha (3,077 acres)	One of the 69 Stations of the Nakasendō and part of the Kisoji. In addition to the late Edo early Meiji period inn town, the designation includes part of the rural surroundings and three villages.	Nagiso, Nagano; 35°34′37.58″N 137°35′42.02″E	Small street lined by wooden two-storeyed houses.
Aoni (白馬村青鬼, Hakuba-mura Aoni)	mountain village	3	59.7 ha (148 acres)	Small mountain village with thatched houses and storehouses, about 200 rice fields, an irrigation channel from the late Edo, early Meiji period.	Hakuba, Nagano; 36°43′12.93″N 137°53′48.58″E	
Suzaka (須坂市須坂, suzakashi suzaka)	merchant quarter and silk spinning town	1	18.3 ha (45 acres)	Town that developed throughout the early modern period as a trading center and flourished in modern times with the rise of the silk industry.	Suzaka, Nagano; 36°39′16.16″N 138°18′41.61″E	
Gujō Hachiman Kita-machi (郡上市郡上八幡北町, Gujō-shi Gujō Hachiman kitamachi)	castle town	3	14.1 ha (35 acres)	Dense town of two-storied houses below Gujō Hachiman Castle with a water supply system surrounded on all sides by mountains and a river.	Gujō, Gifu; 35°45′11.11″N 136°57′25.91″E	
Hondōri Iwamura-chō (恵那市岩村町本通り, Ena-shi Iwamura-chō hondōri)	merchant quarter	3	14.6 ha (36 acres)	Merchant district of a former castle town that prospered during the Edo period as a political, cultural and economic center of the Tōnō region	Ena, Gifu; 35°21′58.25″N 137°26′21.35″E	
Shimoninomachi and Ōshinmachi (高山市下二之町大新町, Takayama-shi Shimoninomachi Ōshinmachi)	merchant quarter	1	6.6 ha (16 acres)	Edo and Meiji period merchant houses in a former castle town.	Takayama, Gifu; 36°8′49.72″N 137°15′31.7″E	
Sanmachi (高山市三町, Takayama-shi Sanmachi)	merchant quarter	1	4.4 ha (11 acres)	Edo period merchant houses in a former castle town.	Takayama, Gifu; 36°8′28.13″N 137°15′38.19″E	Small street lined by low two-storied wooden houses.
Ogimachi (白川村荻町, Shirakawa-mura Ogimachi)	mountain village	3	45.6 ha (113 acres)	Farming village with gasshō-zukuri houses, paddy and other fields. Part of the World Heritage Site Historic Villages of Shirakawa-gō and Gokayama	Shirakawa, Gifu; 36°16′3.71″N 136°54′8.46″E	Many wooden houses with steep thatched gabled roofs.
Mino-machi (美濃市美濃町, Mino-shi Minomachi)	merchant quarter	1	9.3 ha (23 acres)	Former castle town that prospered as a commercial center during the Edo period.	Mino, Gifu; 35°32′43.75″N 136°54′43.54″E	Two storied traditional Japanese houses next to a street.
Hanazawa (焼津市花沢, Yaizu-shi hanazawa)	mountain village	3	19.5 ha (48 acres)	Village located in a river valley along a former main transportation road farming citrus fruits, tea and tobacco using seasonally occupied farmwork huts.	Yaizu, Shizuoka; 34°54′21.89″N 138°19′49.45″E	
Asuke (豊田市足助, Toyota-shi Asuke)	merchant quarter	1	21.5 ha (53 acres)	An example of a commercial center in a mountain location that prospered through the circulation of goods. Large number of Edo period town houses.	Toyota, Aichi; 35°8′13.26″N 137°19′12.17″E	
Arimatsu (名古屋市有松, Nagoya-shi Arimatsu)	dyeing and weaving town	1	7.3 ha (18 acres)	Founded in 1608 where the Tōkaidō crosses the Owari Hills between Chiryū-juku and Narumi-juku, the town prospered through the invention of Arimatsu Shibori (tie-dye) which continues to be produced here.	Nagoya, Aichi; 35°4′0.12″N 136°58′13.96″E	
Seki-juku (亀山市関宿, Kameyama-shi Sekijuku)	post town	3	25 ha (62 acres)	Post station on the Tōkaidō extending for 1.8 km (1.1 mi) in east-west direction including two-storied town houses and the military headquarters.	Kameyama, Mie; 34°51′7.78″N 136°23′27.19″E	Two storied wooden houses next lining a street.
Hachiman (近江八幡市八幡, Ōmihachiman-shi Hachiman)	merchant quarter	1	13.1 ha (32 acres)	Built on the east side of Lake Biwa at the intersection of the Hokkoku Kaidō with the Nakasendō the town was used as a base by Ōmi merchants which is reflected in the large number of elegant town and storehouses.	Ōmihachiman, Shiga; 35°8′18.69″N 136°5′26.65″E	Two storied wooden houses next lining a street.
Sakamoto (大津市坂本, Ōtsu-shi Sakamoto)	monks' dwellings and temple town	3	28.7 ha (71 acres)	Temple town and study place for monks from Hiyoshi Taisha and Enryaku-ji.	Ōtsu, Shiga; 35°4′14.25″N 135°52′16.1″E	A path through a wooded area next to a wall of unhewn stones.
Kawaramachi and Serimachi district (彦根市河原町芹町地区, Hikone-shi Kawaramachi Serimachi-chiku)	merchant quarter	2	5.0 ha (12 acres)	Business district south east of the castle town of Hikone Castle that prospered from the Edo to the early Shōwa period.	Hikone, Shiga; 35°15′47.71″N 136°15′28.87″E	
Gokashō-kondō (東近江市五個荘金堂, Higashiōmi-shi Gokashō-kondō)	farming village	3	32.2 ha (80 acres)	Farming village with a core of residences of Ōmi merchants surrounded by traditional farm houses developed from the late Edo to the early Shōwa period.	Higashiōmi, Shiga; 35°9′15.16″N 136°10′50.78″E	
Ine-ura (伊根町伊根浦, Ine-chō Ine-ura)	fishing village	3	310.2 ha (767 acres)	Fishing village located on an inlet that is surrounded on three sides by mountains. Built from the late Edo to the early Shōwa period, the residential part of the town houses are built on top of the boat shed.	Ine, Kyoto; 35°40′16.08″N 135°17′9.25″E	Wooden houses built on and above water.
Gion-shinbashi (京都市祇園新橋, Kyōto-shi Gion-shinbashi)	tea house quarter	1	1.4 ha (3.5 acres)	Pleasure quarter centered around Shinbashi-dori with buildings constructed just after a great fire in 1865.	Kyoto, Kyoto; 35°0′20.09″N 135°46′25.67″E	Wooden two-storied houses lining a small street. The upper stories' windows are covered.
Saga-Toriimoto (京都市嵯峨鳥居本, Kyōto-shi Saga-toriimoto)	temple town	3	2.6 ha (6.4 acres)	Temple town with thatched houses centered around Adashino Nenbutsu-ji along the Atago Highway which leads to the Atago Shrine.	Kyoto, Kyoto; 35°1′37.01″N 135°39′56.38″E	Large red torii next to a wooden thatched house.
Sannei-zaka (京都市産寧坂, Kyōto-shi Sannei-zaka)	temple town	3	8.2 ha (20 acres)	Former temple town serving among others, Hokan-ji, Kiyomizu-dera and Yasaka Shrine. The stretch from Sannei-zaka towards Ninen-zaka is lined by single-storied shops and tea houses with mushikomado (虫籠窓) latticed windows. From Sannei-zaka to Kōdai-ji there are two-storied Taishō period buildings in sukiya-zukuri style.	Kyoto, Kyoto; 34°59′56.81″N 135°46′50.62″E	Stone steps on a slope lined by houses.
Kamigamo (京都市上賀茂, Kyōto-shi Kamigamo)	shrine quarter	3	2.7 ha (6.7 acres)	Residential neighborhood for the head priests of Kamigamo Shrine including a stone bridge, earthen walls, gates, front gardens and single storied houses with sangawarabuki tile roofs, (Note: (sangawarabuki, 桟瓦葺): a roof tile combining a broad concave tile with a semi-cylindrical convex tile into one tile. The tile is square undulating from concave to convex.)	Kyoto, Kyoto; 35°3′28.19″N 135°45′18.73″E	
Yoshihara (舞鶴市吉原, Maizuru-shi Yoshihara)	fishing village	2	8.9 ha (22 acres)	Fishing village orginating from a relocation of the castle town of Tanabe Castle with structures dating from the end of the Edo period to the 1950s.	Maizuru, Kyoto; 35°27′21.55″N 135°19′43.06″E	
Kita Miyama-chō (南丹市美山町北, Nantan-shi Miyama-chō Kita)	mountain village	3	127.5 ha (315 acres)	Village with about 50 thatched roof houses and hardened stone walls extending for about 600 m × 300 m (1,970 ft × 980 ft) along the upper stream of the Yura River.	Nantan, Kyoto; 35°18′48.3″N 135°37′23.58″E	Wooden houses with thatched roofs in a mountain setting.
Kaya (与謝野町加悦, Yosano-chō Kaya)	textile town	2	12 ha (30 acres)	Former castle town that developed in early modern Japan until the early Shōwa period as a production center for Tango chirimen silk crêpe.	Yosano, Kyoto; 35°30′16.13″N 135°5′33.63″E	
Tondabayashi (富田林市富田林, Tondabayashi-shi Tondabayashi)	jinaimachi town, zaigō town	1	11.2 ha (28 acres)	Founded as an Ikkō Jōdo Shinshū jinaimachi in the late Muromachi period on a terrace of the Ishi river and centered around Kōshō-ji Betsuin temple. In the Edo period it became a zaigō town with large town houses lining the street.	Tondabayashi, Osaka; 34°30′1.41″N 135°36′4.25″E	A narrow street lined by houses with a wooden lower part, a white upper storey and tile roofs.
Sasayama (篠山市篠山, Sasayama-shi Sasayama)	castle town	2	40.2 ha (99 acres)	Samurai houses, merchant houses and the early Edo period Sasayama Castle founded by Tokugawa Ieyasu.	Sasayama, Hyōgo; 35°4′16.4″N 135°13′18.89″E	Thatched house beyond a white wall with a small gate which both have a thatched roof.
Fukusumi (篠山市福住, Sasayama-shi Fukusumi)	post town, farming village	豊岡市出石3	25.2 ha (62 acres)	Post town and farming community that developed along a major road with two storied tile roofed and single storied thatched houses, with entrances on the gable end.	Sasayama, Hyōgo; 35°4′20.49″N 135°21′27.25″E	
Ōya-chō Ōsugi (養父市大屋町大杉, yabu-shi ōya-chō ōsugi)	mountain village and sericulture community	3	5.8 ha (14 acres)	Formerly one of the leading silk farming centers in Tajima Province prospering from the late Meiji to the early Shōwa period.	Yabu, Hyōgo; 35°19′52.46″N 134°39′2.95″E	
Kitano-chō and Yamamoto-dōri (神戸市北野町山本通, Kōbe-shi Kitano-chō Yamamoto-dōri)	port quarter	1	9.3 ha (23 acres)	District of foreign residences from the late Meiji and early Taishō Period that were established after the opening of the Port of Kobe in 1867.	Kōbe, Hyōgo; 34°42′1.39″N 135°11′20.94″E	A row of non-Japanese looking wooden houses along a street.
Izushi (豊岡市出石, Toyooka-shi Izushi)	castle town	2	23.1 ha (57 acres)	Town houses, temples, shrines, and samurai residences, that appeared in connection with the construction of Izushi Castle by Koide Yoshihide in 1604.	Toyooka, Hyōgo; 35°27′46.68″N 134°52′26.79″E	Wooden houses and a wooden clock tower on a stone base.
Tatsuno (たつの市龍野, Tatsuno-shi Tatsuno)	merchant quarter and brewers quarter	1	15.9 ha (39 acres)	Castle town beneath Tatsuno Castle that developed into a merchant district during the Edo period and a major producer of soy sauce with a tradition dating back to the 17th century.	Tatsuno, Hyōgo; 34°51′59.21″N 134°32′47.84″E	
Matsuyama (宇陀市松山, Uda-shi Matsuyama)	merchant quarter	1	17 ha (42 acres)	Located between Mount Shiroyama and the Uda River, Matsuyama developed from a castle town to a political and economic center of the Uda District. The town houses date from the late Edo to the early Shōwa period.	Uda, Nara; 34°28′45.87″N 135°55′58.57″E	Wooden houses lining small streets.
Imai-chō (橿原市今井町, Kashihara-shi Imai-chō)	jinaimachi town, zaigō town	1	17.4 ha (43 acres)	Originating as an autonomous religious community centered around Shōnen-ji (称念寺) during the Muromachi Period, the town was formerly surrounded by a moat.	Kashihara, Nara; 34°30′25.86″N 135°47′10.35″E	Wooden houses with a white upper storey lining a small street.
Gojō-shinmachi (五條市五條新町, Gojō-shi Gojō-shinmachi)	merchant quarter	1	7 ha (17 acres)	Large number of Edo period town houses of a flourishing merchant town of south Yamato.	Gojō, Nara; 34°20′53.94″N 135°41′31.78″E	
Yuasa (湯浅町湯浅, Yuasa-chō Yuasa)	brewers quarter	2	6.3 ha (16 acres)	Soy sauce maker district that flourished at the end of the 16th century, with shops and storehouses dating to the Edo period, the oldest are two-storied structures with gabled roof and hongawara tiles (Note: (hongawarabuki, 本瓦葺): a tile roof composed of flat broad concave tiles and semi-cylindrical convex tiles covering the seams of the former)	Yuasa, Wakayama; 34°2′11.68″N 135°10′28.56″E	A small street lined by wooden two-storied houses.
Utsubuki-tamagawa (倉吉市打吹玉川, Kurayoshi-shi Utsubuki-tamagawa)	merchant quarter	1	9.2 ha (23 acres)	Commercial and industrial city that prospered from the Edo to the Taishō period. The preservation district consists of town house, storehouses with white plaster walls and reddish roofs.	Kurayoshi, Tottori; 35°25′56.1″N 133°49′23.12″E	Wooden houses with white upper stories.
Tokorogo (大山町所子, Daisen-chō Tokorogo)	farming village	3	25.8 ha (64 acres)	Farming village with river irrigation from the Amida River, consisting of large scale main buildings and affiliated houses from the early modern period until the early Shōwa period including the Kadowaki Family House (門脇家住宅).	Daisen, Tottori; 35°28′58.99″N 133°28′0.81″E	Large wooden house with thatched roof.
Wakasa (若桜町若桜, Wakasa-chō Wakasa)	merchant quarter	3	9.5 ha (23 acres)		Wakasa, Yazu District Tottori; 35°20′38.25″N 134°23′51.13″E	—
Yunotsu (大田市温泉津, Ōda-shi Yunotsu)	port quarter, hot-spring town	2	36.6 ha (90 acres)	The hot spring area developed from medieval times as port for the Iwami Ginzan Silver Mine (a World Heritage Site). The current townscape of hot spring ryokan located in a narrow and steep valley date from the late Edo to the early Shōwa period.	Ōda, Shimane; 35°5′44.3″N 132°20′52.12″E	Small street lined by wooden houses.
Ōmori-ginzan (大田市大森銀山, Ōda-shi Ōmori-ginzan)	mining town	3	162.7 ha (402 acres)	Townscape around the Iwami Ginzan Silver Mine (a World Heritage Site) with a mixture of samurai residences and town houses built from the Edo period onward.	Ōda, Shimane; 35°6′51.31″N 132°26′42.9″E	
Tsuwano (津和野町津和野, Tsuwano-chō Tsuwano)	samurai quarter, merchant quarter	2	11.1 ha (27 acres)	Developed in the early Edo period as a castle town of Tsuwano Castle, Tsuwano contains residences of senior vassals and a merchant district centered along the old San'indō.	Tsuwano, Shimane; 34°27′59.12″N 131°46′19.02″E	
Mihonoseki (松江市美保関, matsue-shi mihonoseki)	temple town, port quarter	2	5.9 ha (15 acres)		Matsue, Shimane; 35°33′43.75″N 133°18′28.85″E	
Fukiya (高梁市吹屋, Takahashi-shi Fukiya)	mining town	3	6.4 ha (16 acres)	Copper mining town and leading producer of copper in Chūgoku from the Muromachi to the Meiji period. With the decline of copper production in the Edo period, production shifted to Red Iron Oxide (Bengala) which prospered until the Taishō period. The houses feature red clay tile roofs, rouge mud walls and latticework.	Takahashi, Okayama; 34°51′39.96″N 133°28′13.64″E	Small street lined by wooden houses.
Kurashiki-gawahan (倉敷市倉敷川畔, Kurashiki-shi Kurashiki-gawahan)	merchant quarter	1	15 ha (37 acres)	Founded by Ukita Hideie, it later became the port of the Bitchū-Matsuyama Domain and served as relay point for goods to Kyoto. The townscape consists of glazed tile roofs and canals.	Kurashiki, Okayama; 34°35′46.96″N 133°46′17.34″E	White houses with roof tiling next to a small channel.
Jōsai (津山市城西, Tsuyama-shi Jōsai)	merchant quarter, temple town	2	12 ha (30 acres)	Edo period temple town with large scale temples in the western part of the old castle town and a commercial district along the Izumo Kaidō.	Tsuyama, Okayama; 35°4′8.86″N 134°0′15.61″E	—
Jōtō (津山市城東, Tsuyama-shi Jōtō)	merchant quarter	1	8.1 ha (20 acres)	Merchant district that developed from the castle town of Tsuyama Castle, with buildings constructed from the Edo to the Shōwa period, featuring kōshiirimado (格子入窓) and mushikomado (虫籠窓) latticed windows, namako walls and sodekabe (袖壁) side walls.	Tsuyama, Okayama; 35°3′45.55″N 134°0′51.55″E	
Yakage (矢掛町矢掛宿, Yakage-chō Yakage-juku)	post town	2	11.5 ha (28 acres)	Post station on the San'yōdō containing a sub-honjin from the Edo period.	Yakage, Okayama; 34°38′5.9″N 133°34′37.21″E	
Mitarai Yutaka-machi (呉市豊町御手洗, Kure-shi Yutaka-machi Mitarai)	port quarter	2	6.9 ha (17 acres)	With the development of the Western Circuit (西廻り航路, nishimawari kōro) shipping route through the Seto Inland Sea in the Edo period, Yutaka-machi Mitarai on the island of Ōsakishimojima grew as a port for ships waiting for rising tide or favourable winds. The town includes gabled houses with sangawarabuki roofs and is dotted with western style house. The port area retains its historical character with groynes, stepped piers and a lighthouse.	Kure, Hiroshima; 34°10′45.57″N 132°52′1.7″E	Wooden houses with white walls.
Takehara district (竹原市竹原地区, Takehara-shi Takehara-chiku)	salt works town	1	5 ha (12 acres)	Market and port town that prospered with the introduction of salt pans in 1650. From the late Edo period and backed by the economic development the town became a center of learning, tea ceremony and other refined cultural activities. The current townscape with hongawarabuki roofs and solid plastered fire-resistant wall (漆喰塗籠, shikkui nurigome) dates from the Edo to the early Shōwa period.	Takehara, Hiroshima; 34°20′48.45″N 132°54′36.08″E	A row of black houses.
Tomo-chō (福山市鞆町, fukuyama-shi tomo-chō)	port quarter	2	8.6 ha (21 acres)	Port town along the main shipping routes along the Seto Inland Sea with Edo period town houses, temples, shrines, stone structures and harbour facilities.	Fukuyama, Hiroshima; 34°23′1.36″N 133°22′54.37″E	
Miyajima (廿日市市宮島町, Hatsukaichi-shi Miyajima-chō)	temple town	2	16.8 ha (42 acres)		Miyajima, Hatsukaichi, Hiroshima; 34°17′49.76″N 132°19′14.99″E	—
Hamasaki (萩市浜崎, Hagi-shi Hamasaki)	port quarter	2	10.3 ha (25 acres)	Port town formed together with a castle town at the mouth of the Abu River. It flourished in early modern Japan in the shipbuilding and fishery industry and prospered from the Taishō to the early Shōwa period as a trading center for small dried sardines (イリコ) and Natsumikan.	Hagi, Yamaguchi; 34°25′10.02″N 131°24′0.24″E	
Hiyako district (萩市平安古地区, Hagi-shi Hiyako-chiku)	samurai quarter	2	4 ha (9.9 acres)	Samurai residences near the Hashimoto River that were created with the development of the castle. In addition to residential architecture the district includes a Nagayamon gate and storehouses.	Hagi, Yamaguchi; 34°24′14.07″N 131°23′20.85″E	
Horiuchi district (萩市堀内地区, Hagi-shi Horiuchi-chiku)	samurai quarter	2	77.4 ha (191 acres)	This district covers almost the whole area of the third bailey of Hagi Castle founded by Mōri Terumoto in 1608. It contained the domain's offices and residences of Mōri's household and high ranked samurai.	Hagi, Yamaguchi; 34°24′45.96″N 131°23′13.66″E	
Sasanamiichi (萩市佐々並市, Hagi-shi Sasanamiichi)	post town	2	20.8 ha (51 acres)	A former post town set among rice fields and situated along the main highway of the Hagi Domain. The town was redeveloped by the appearance of tea houses in early modern times. Houses with thatched and sangawarabuki roofs	Hagi, Yamaguchi; 34°17′13.66″N 131°27′48.2″E	
Furuichi and Kanaya (柳井市古市金屋, Yanai-shi Furuichi-Kanaya)	merchant quarter	1	1.7 ha (4.2 acres)	Due to its strategic location on the Seto Inland Sea and on Yanai River, Yanai flourished since ancient times as a trading center. Merchant houses with hongawarabuki roofs and solid plastered fire-resistant wall (漆喰塗籠, shikkui nurigome).	Yanai, Yamaguchi; 33°58′9.63″N 132°6′29.92″E	
Ochiai Higashiiyayama-son (三好市東祖谷山村落合, Miyoshi-shi Higashiiyayamason Ochiai)	mountain village	3	32.3 ha (80 acres)	Village and farmland on a steep mountain slope supported by dry-stone walls with private houses dating to the 18th century.	Miyoshi, Tokushima; 33°52′56.69″N 133°56′3.65″E	
Minami-machi Wakimachi (美馬市脇町南町, Wakimachi Minami-machi)	merchant quarter	1	5.3 ha (13 acres)	A district that preserves private houses from each period after the beginning of the 18th century. The houses have a distinctive design with tile roofs, decorative udatsu (卯建) posts and the frame cased in a fireproof coat of plaster (大壁造, ōkabe-zukuri).	Mima, Tokushima; 34°4′7.5″N 134°8′47.63″E	Wooden houses with white walls, roof tiles and protruding walls.
Mugi, Teba Island (牟岐町出羽島, Mugi-chō Teba-jima)	fishing village	3	3.7 ha (9.1 acres)	Fishing village formed around a cove at the northern end of Teba Island from 1800 due to the immigration policy of the Tokushima Domain. From the Meiji to the prewar Shōwa period it prospered through bonito and tuna fishing.	Teba Island, Mugi, Tokushima; 33°38′13″N 134°25′25.52″E	Small boats and houses.
Kasajima Shiwakuhonjima-chō (丸亀市塩飽本島町笠島, Marugame-shi Shiwakuhonjima-chō Kasajima)	port quarter	3	13.1 ha (32 acres)	A former castle town with houses from the mid-Edo to the Meiji period, where members of the Shiwaku Suigun lived.	Marugame, Kagawa; 34°23′40.02″N 133°47′15.28″E	White two-storied houses.
Unomachi Uwa-chō (西予市宇和町卯之町, Seiyo-shi Uwa-chō Unomachi)	zaigō town	2	4.9 ha (12 acres)	Former zaigō hometown of the Uwajima Domain originating from a castle town of Matsuba Castle (松葉城) that functioned during the Edo period as a trading center for agricultural produce and hinoki cypress as well as a post station on the Uwajima road and gateway to Meiseki-ji on the Shikoku Pilgrimage. The preservation district includes remains of town houses from the Edo to the Shōwa Period as well as western style churches and schools.	Seiyo, Ehime; 33°21′50.15″N 132°30′42.83″E	Street lined with wooden houses with white walls.
Yōkaichi-gokoku (内子町八日市護国, Uchiko-chō Yōkaichi-gokoku)	wax maker quarter	3	3.5 ha (8.6 acres)	Wax maker town with houses from the Edo and Meiji Period that developed along the Konpira road of the Shikoku Pilgrimage. The buildings line a 750 m (2,460 ft) long street and have plastered fireproof walls (漆喰塗大壁).	Uchiko, Ehime; 33°33′24.37″N 132°39′12.43″E	
Iwamatsu Tsushima-chō (宇和島市津島町岩松, Uwajima-shi Tsuchima-chō Iwamatsu)	zaigō town	3	10.6 ha (26 acres)	Distribution center for goods that developed from the late Edo period to modern times on a narrow site near the mouth of the Iwamatsu river. The site includes townhouses, storehouses, outbuildings and farmhouses as well as the walls of waterways.	Uwajima, Ehime; 33°7′24.6″N 132°31′21.72″E	—
Doikachū (安芸市土居廓中, Aki-shi Doikachū)	samurai quarter	2	9.2 ha (23 acres)	Samurai town with narrow ordered streets, hedges, fences and houses from the late Edo to the early Shōwa period.	Aki, Kōchi; 33°31′10.41″N 133°54′44.78″E	
Kiragawa-chō (室戸市吉良川町, Muroto-shi Kiragawa-chō)	zaigō town	1	18.3 ha (45 acres)	Residential town with merchant and store houses on a narrow plot along the road connecting Kōchi with Muroto. Buildings have white plastered walls and characteristic water-draining tiles (水切り瓦).	Muroto, Kōchi; 33°19′52.9″N 134°5′56.3″E	
Niikawa and Tagomori (うきは市新川田篭, Ukiha-shi Niikawa Tagomori)	mountain village	3	71.2 ha (176 acres)	Villages with irrigation channel rice farming along the Kumanoue River valley in the Minō Mountains. The villages contain houses with thatched yosemune style (Note: (yosemune-zukuri, 寄棟造): a hipped roof where the front and back are trapezoidal and the sides triangular in shape; in Japan generally used for buildings of less importance) roofs as well as irimoya style tile-roofed houses that gained popularity starting in the Meiji period. In addition the preservation district includes stone walls, main and wayside Shinto shrines.	Ukiha, Fukuoka; 33°16′36.41″N 130°49′56.04″E	
Chikugo-yoshii (うきは市筑後吉井, Ukiha-shi Chikugo-yoshii)	zaigō town	3	20.7 ha (51 acres)	A former post station along the Bungo Road that, in the second half of the Edo period, developed into a residential town and economic center of the Chikugo district. After a large fire in 1867, houses received plaster fireproofing walls.	Ukiha, Fukuoka; 33°20′33.56″N 130°45′26.83″E	White houses with a characteristic net pattern on the lower part of the outer walls.
Kurogi (八女市黒木, Yame-shi Kurogi)	zaigō town	3	18.4 ha (45 acres)	Rural town with water irrigation channels.	Yame, Fukuoka; 33°12′45.56″N 130°40′9.89″E	
Akizuki (朝倉市秋月, Asakura-shi Akizuki)	castle town	2	58.6 ha (145 acres)	Former castle town of the Akizuki branch of the Kuroda clan established in the early Edo period. The district includes merchant houses and residences of samurai and of Shinto priests.	Asakura, Fukuoka; 33°28′5.5″N 130°41′30.07″E	
Yame-fukushima (八女市八女福島, Yame-shi Yame-fukushima)	merchant quarter	2	19.8 ha (49 acres)	Townscape with storehouses in a former castle town of the Yanagawa Domain Fukushima Castle. Later with the abandonment of the castle it was taken over by the Kurume Domain and flourished as a trading center for locally produced agricultural products.	Yame, Fukuoka; 33°12′40.18″N 130°33′42.18″E	
Shiotatsu (嬉野市塩田津, Ureshino-shi Shiotatsu)	merchant quarter	2	12.8 ha (32 acres)	Former river port town utilizing the tidal movement which flourished as a trading center for rice, ceramics, raw materials and Amakusa pottery.	Ureshino, Saga; 33°7′50.91″N 130°3′36.05″E	Wooden houses with white walls.
Hamashozu-machi and Hamakanaya-machi (鹿島市浜庄津町浜金屋町, Kashima-shi Hamashōzu-machi Hamakanaya-machi)	port quarter and zaigō town	2	2 ha (4.9 acres)	Districts with thatched and sangawarabuki roofs that developed in connection with a river port.	Kashima, Saga; 33°5′27.72″N 130°7′12.93″E	
Hachihongi-shuku Hamanaka-machi (鹿島市浜中町八本木宿, Kashima-shi Hamanaka-machi Hachihongi-shuku)	brewers town	1	6.7 ha (17 acres)	Town on the Nagasaki Kaidō where sake brewing became popular in the mid Edo period and towards the late Edo period there were around ten buildings involved in this business. The remaining structures date from the late Edo to the Shōwa period.	Kashima, Saga; 33°5′34.43″N 130°6′53.96″E	
Arita-uchiyama (有田町有田内山, Arita-machi Arita-uchiyama)	porcelain-maker town	3	15.9 ha (39 acres)	Arita's townscape was formed after the great Bunsei era fire of 1828 and consists of a mixture of machiya town houses and western architecture.	Arita, Saga; 33°11′23.03″N 129°53′52.37″E	
Kōjiro-kūji (雲仙市神代小路, Unzen-shi Kōjiro-kūji)	samurai quarter	2	9.8 ha (24 acres)	Edo period samurai district centered around the Nabeshima Residence including waterways, stone walls and hedges.	Unzen, Nagasaki; 32°52′7.62″N 130°16′3.27″E	Small street lined by walls.
Higashi-yamate (長崎市東山手, Nagasaki-shi Higashi-yamate)	port quarter	2	7.5 ha (19 acres)	Stone paving, brick walls and western houses from the Meiji to the Taishō period along the Dutch Slope.	Nagasaki, Nagasaki; 32°44′13.89″N 129°52′26.08″E	Slope, stone walls and a wooden house.
Minami-yamate (長崎市南山手, Nagasaki-shi Minami-yamate)	port quarter	2	17 ha (42 acres)	Foreign settlement that opened during the bakmatsu on a gentle slope with western style houses from the end of the Edo to the Meiji period.	Nagasaki, Nagasaki; 32°43′58.44″N 129°52′7.08″E	The Glover Garden.
Kōnoura Ōshima-mura (平戸市大島村神浦, Hirado-shi Ōshima-mura Kōnoura)	port quarter	2	21.2 ha (52 acres)	In the middle ages, the port of call of kenminsen in the Genkai Sea and later the headquarter of the whaling industry. The town includes gabled houses with sangawarabuki roofs and trapezoidal floor plans matching the curved streets.	Hirado, Nagasaki; 33°28′42.46″N 129°33′24.13″E	
Mameda-machi (日田市豆田町, Hita-shi Mameda-machi)	merchant quarter	2	10.7 ha (26 acres)	Developed from a castle town to the political and economical center of Kyushu after becoming under the jurisdiction of the bakufu shogunate in 1639. Houses from different eras are preserved and form an orderly townscape with two streets running north-south crossed by five streets in east-west direction.	Hita, Ōita; 33°19′38.51″N 130°56′12.47″E	Wooden houses.
Kita-dai and Minami-dai (杵築市北台南台, Kitsuki-shi kita-dai minami-dai)	samurai quarter	2	16.1 ha (40 acres)	Residential neighborhood for upper and middle-class samurai from the Kitsuki Domain around Kitsuki Castle. It consists of two parts, Kita-dai and Minami-dai separated by a valley and connected via stone steps and slopes of masonry.	Kitsuki, Ōita; 33°24′59.77″N 131°37′5.54″E	Sloped streets with masonry walls.
Tonegawa (椎葉村十根川, Shiibason Tonegawa)	mountain village	3	39.9 ha (99 acres)	Settlement on a terraced hillside in the central part of the Kyushu mountain range.	Shiiba, Miyazaki; 32°30′45.67″N 131°11′33.38″E	
Mimitsu (日向市美々津, Hyuga-shi Mimitsu)	port quarter	2	7.2 ha (18 acres)	Port town that flourished as a ship building center from the bakumatsu to the Taishō period. The townscape consists of gabled houses along three main streets and fire prevention road known as tsukinuke.	Hyuga, Miyazaki; 32°20′11.6″N 131°36′43.49″E	Two-storied wooden houses.
Obi (日南市飫肥, Nichinan-shi Obi)	samurai quarter	2	19.8 ha (49 acres)	Samurai district of a former castle town of the Itō clan with stone walls, the castle front gate (大手門, ōtemon), gates for the samurai residences (長屋門, nagayamon) and other gates.	Nichinan, Miyazaki; 31°37′36.21″N 131°21′11.46″E	
Iriki-fumoto (薩摩川内市入来麓, Satsumasendai-shi Iriki-fumoto)	samurai quarter	2	19.2 ha (47 acres)	Samurai district with pebble fences and hedges on stone walls, located between Kiyoshiki Castle and the Hiwaki River.	Satsumasendai, Kagoshima; 31°48′28.36″N 130°25′48.57″E	Small street lined with low stone walls.
Izumi-fumoto (出水市出水麓, Izumi-shi Izumi-fumoto)	samurai quarter	2	43.8 ha (108 acres)	Oldest and largest among the outer castles established by the Satsuma Clan.	Izumi, Kagoshima; 32°4′40.96″N 130°21′37.83″E	
Chiran (南九州市知覧, Minamikyūshū-shi Chiran)	samurai quarter	2	18.6 ha (46 acres)	Part of the outer castles established by the Satsuma Clan and in possession of the Chiran-Shimazu Clan (Sata Clan), the district is centered around the feudal lord's residence.	Minamikyūshū, Kagoshima; 31°22′41.27″N 130°26′44.81″E	Small street lined with low stone walls.
Kasedafumoto (南さつま市加世田麓, Minamisatsuma-shi Kasedafumoto)	samurai quarter	2	20.0 ha (49 acres)	An outer castle in possession of the Shimazu clan since the 15th century.	Minamisatsuma, Kagoshima; 31°24′48.92″N 130°19′8.75″E	
Tonaki Island (渡名喜村渡名喜島, Tonaki-son Tonaki-jima)	farming village	3	21.4 ha (53 acres)	Village with red tile roofs and streets of white sand in the flat central part of Tonaki Island.	Tonaki, Okinawa; 26°22′17.54″N 127°8′31.69″E	
Taketomi (竹富町竹富島, Taketomi-chō Taketomi-jima)	farming village	3	38.3 ha (95 acres)	Traditional composition and arrangement of wooden one-storey residential houses with red tile roofs surrounded by stone walls.	Taketomi, Okinawa; 24°19′49.14″N 124°5′11.86″E	Houses surrounded by low stone walls of unhewn stones.

== See also ==
- Tourism in Japan
