= Kitano-chō =

Historical district in Kobe, Japan

Coordinates: 34°41′54″N 135°11′25″E

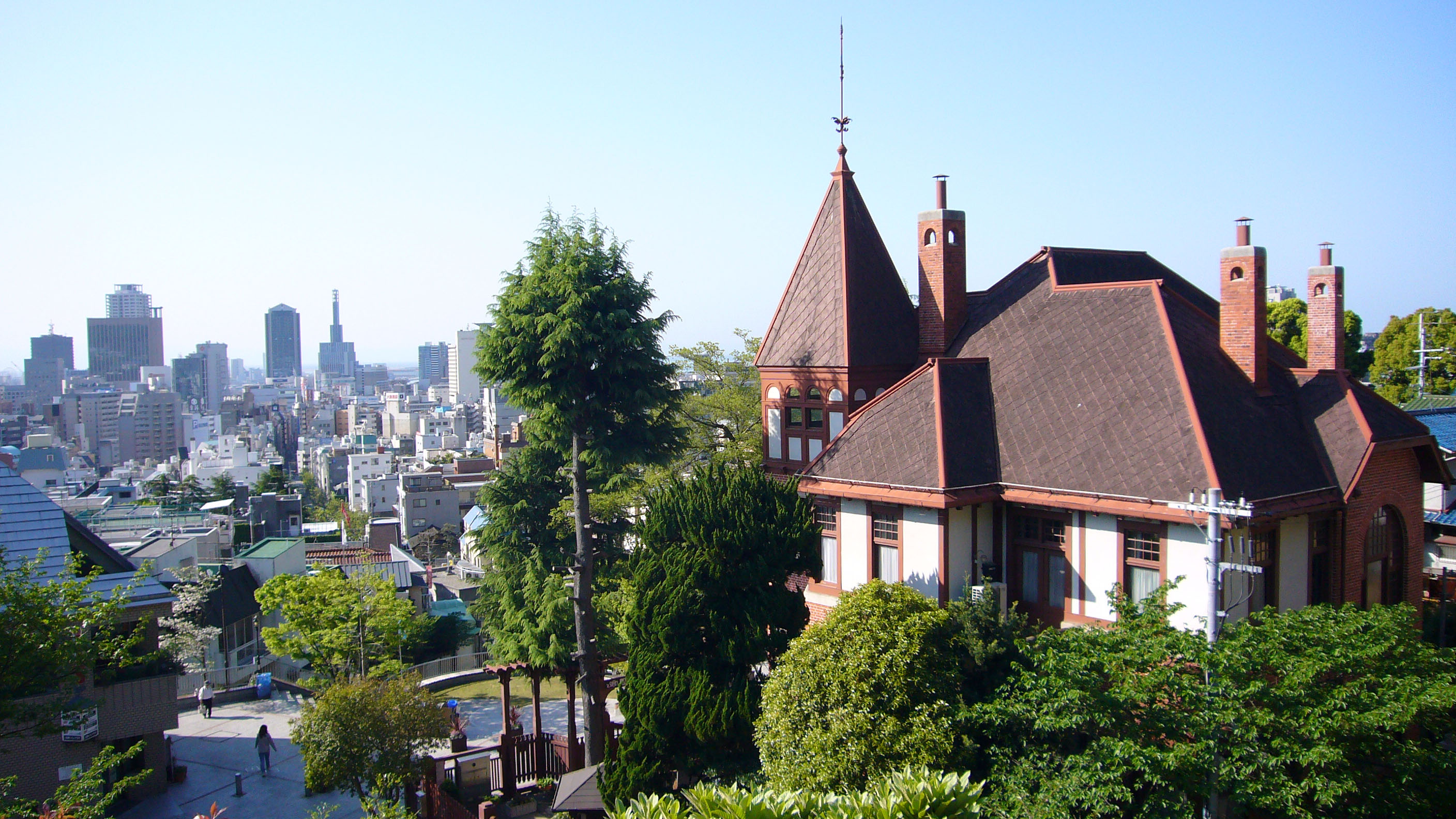
Weathercock House (風見鶏の館, Kazamidori no Yakata), built in 1909, overlooks the city of Kobe

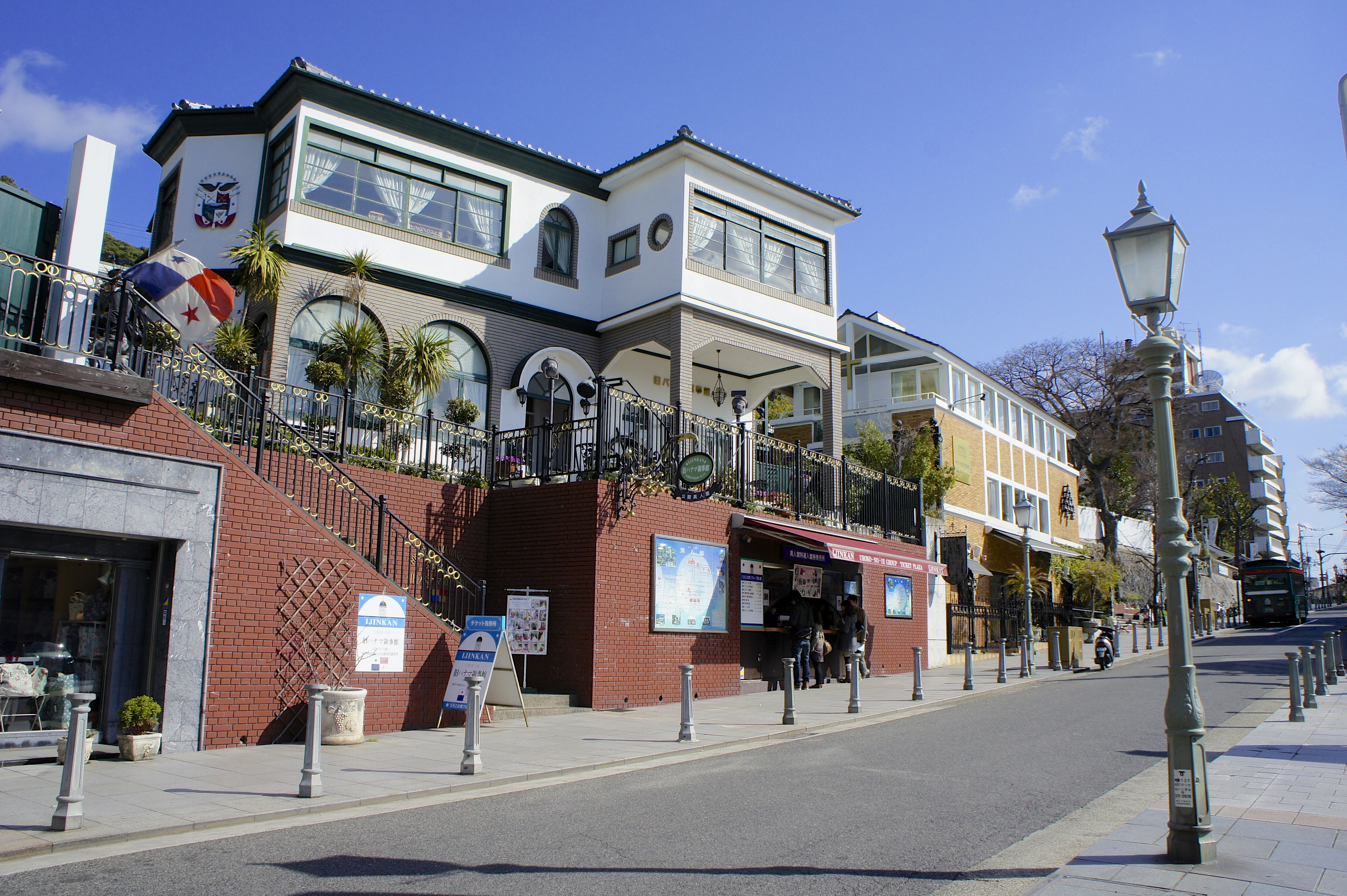
Former Panama Consulate, Kitanocho

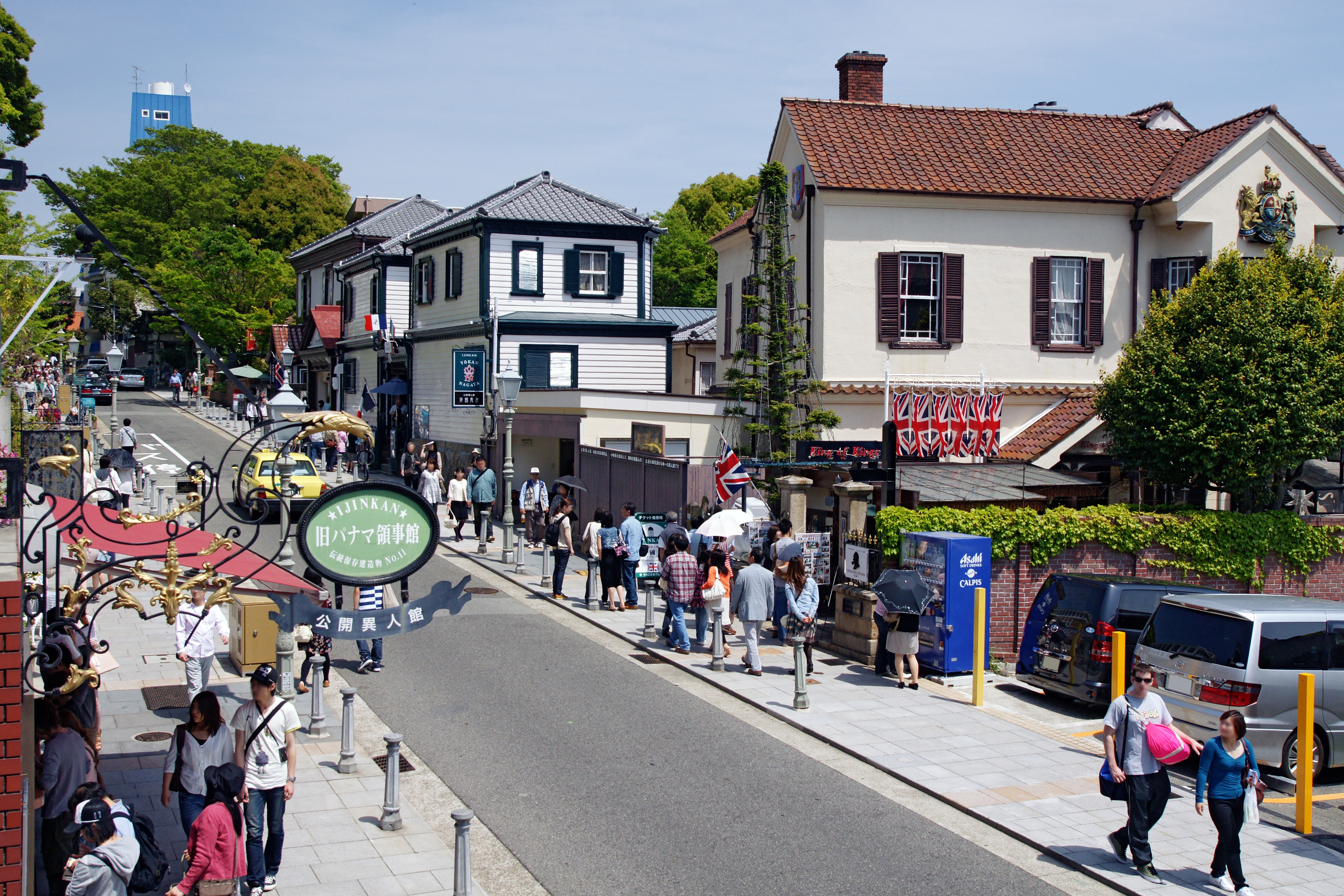
Kitano Street

Kitano-chō (北野町) or Kitano Ijinkan (北野異人館) is a historical district in Kobe, Hyōgo Prefecture, Japan, which contains a number of foreign residences from the late Meiji and early Taishō eras of Japanese history. While the term ijinkan (異人館) can refer to any foreign residence of this period in Japan, it usually refers to those of Kitano given the number and high concentration of those that remain. Ijinkan districts exist in other locales (notably Hakodate and Nagasaki), but due to war and natural disasters, these districts are not as well preserved.

While some of the houses still serve as residences, many are open to tourists, making Kitano-chō one of the principal tourist attractions in Kobe.

== See also ==
- Groups of Traditional Buildings
