= Machiya =

Traditional Japanese wooden townhouse

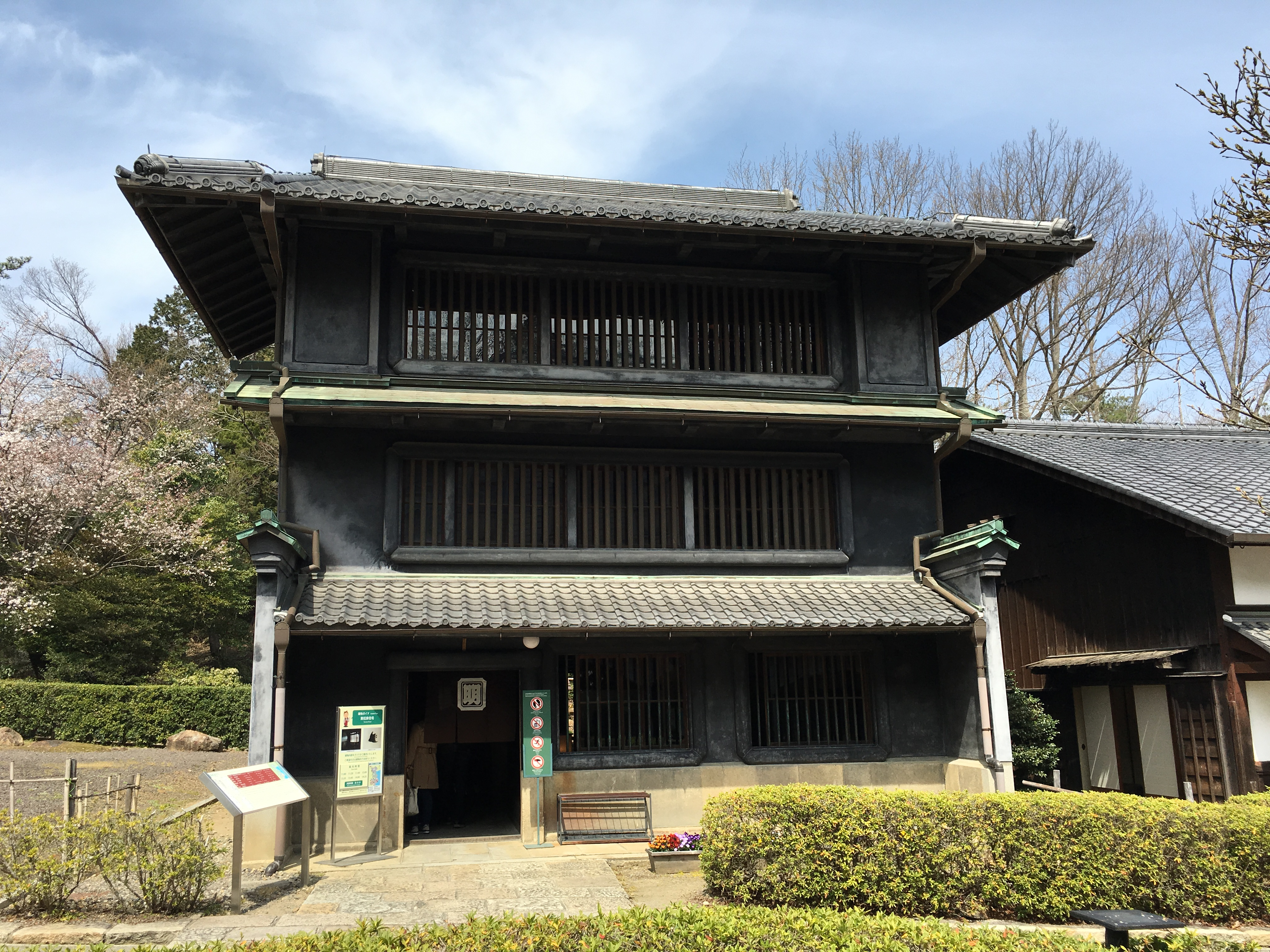
The Tōmatsu house from Funairi-chō, Nagoya, is an example of a large machiya.

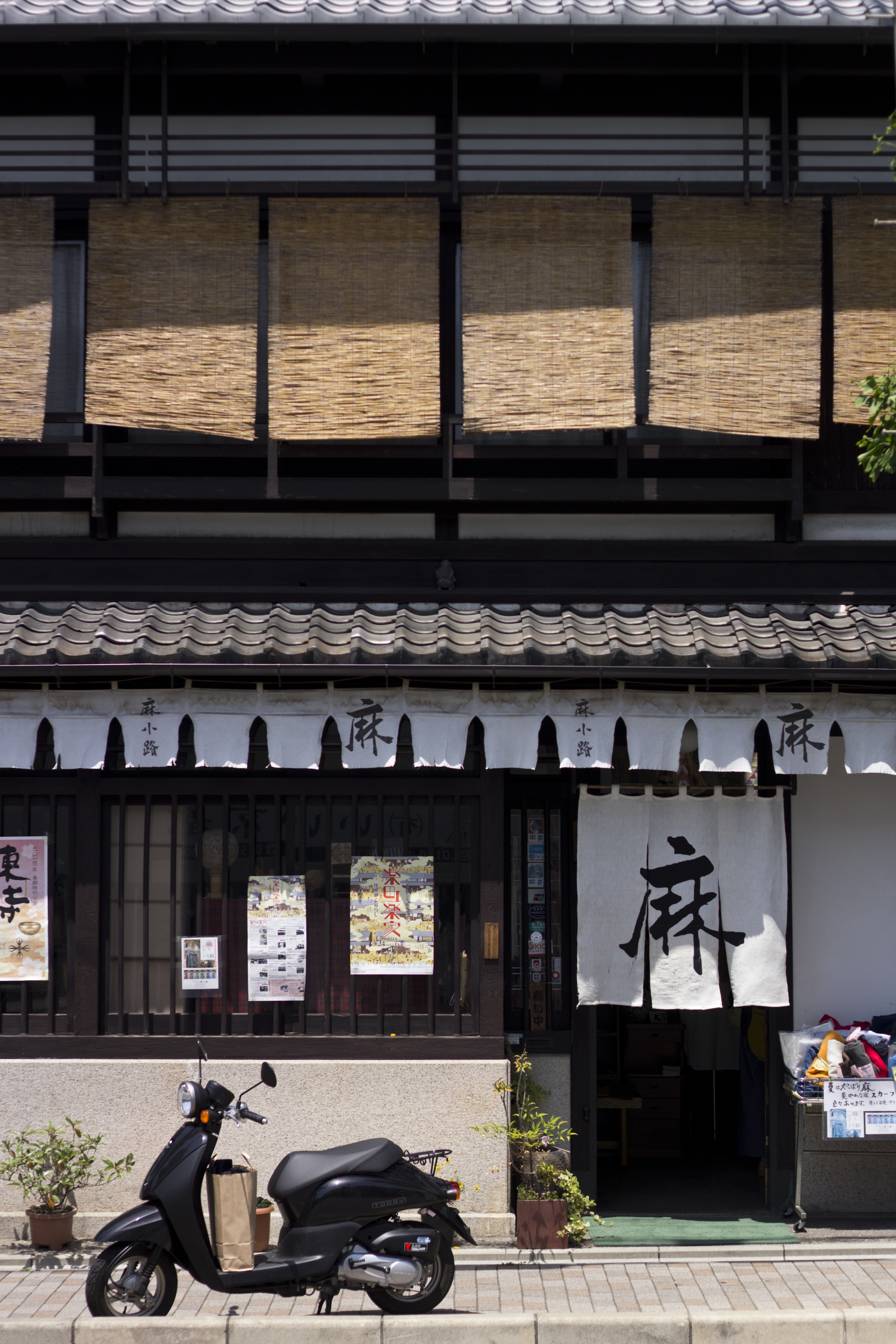
Machiya façade in Kyoto

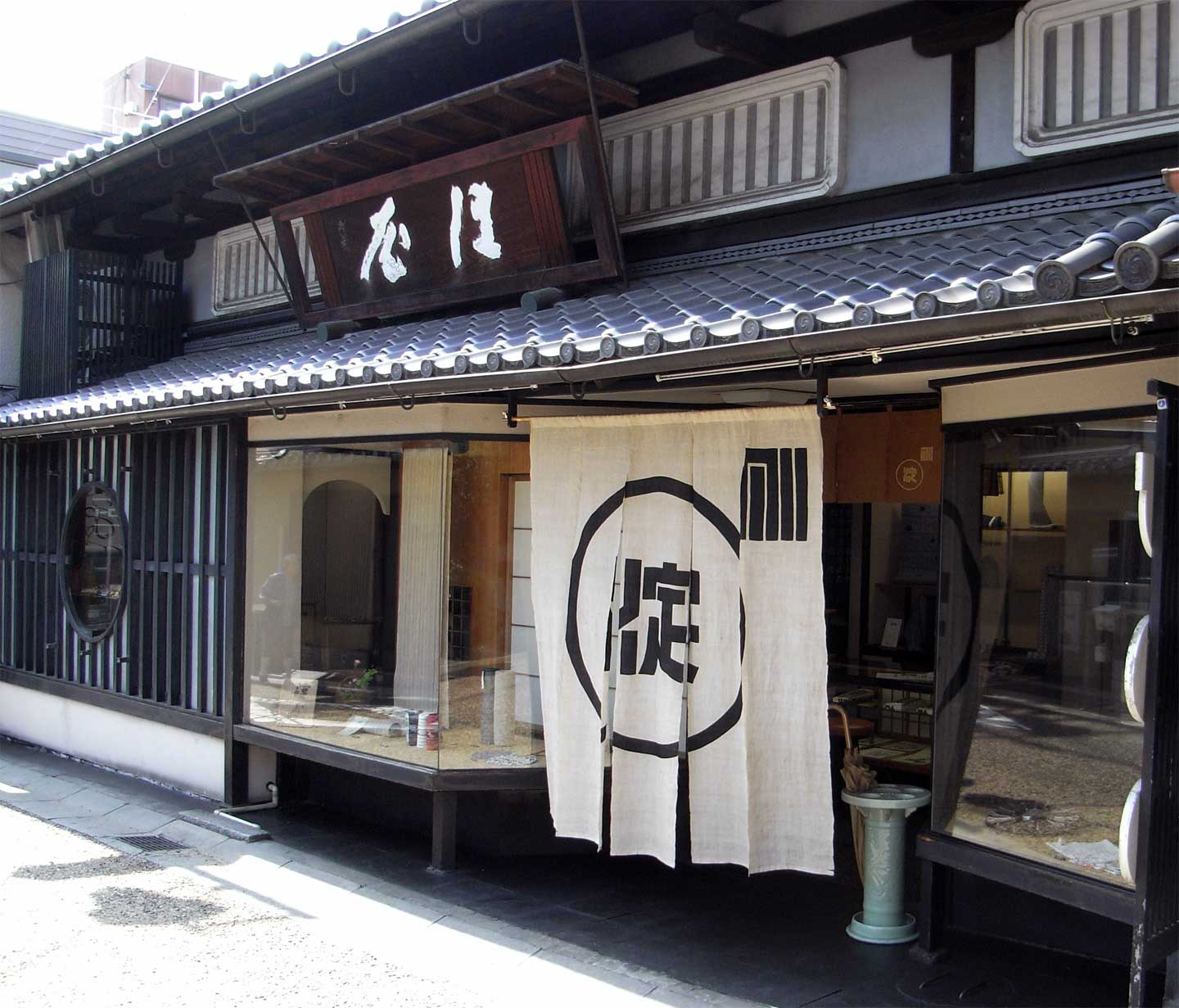
Old fabric shop in Nara

Machiya (町屋/町家) are traditional wooden townhouses found throughout Japan and typified in the historical capital of Kyoto. Machiya ('townhouses') and nōka ('farm dwellings') constitute the two categories of Japanese vernacular architecture known as minka ('folk dwellings').

Machiya originated as early as the Heian period and continued to develop through to the Edo period and even into the Meiji period. Machiya housed urban merchants and craftsmen, a class collectively referred to as chōnin ('townspeople').

The word machiya is written using two kanji: machi (町, 'town') and ya (家, 'house') or ya (屋, 'shop'), depending on the kanji used to express it.

== Kyōmachiya ==
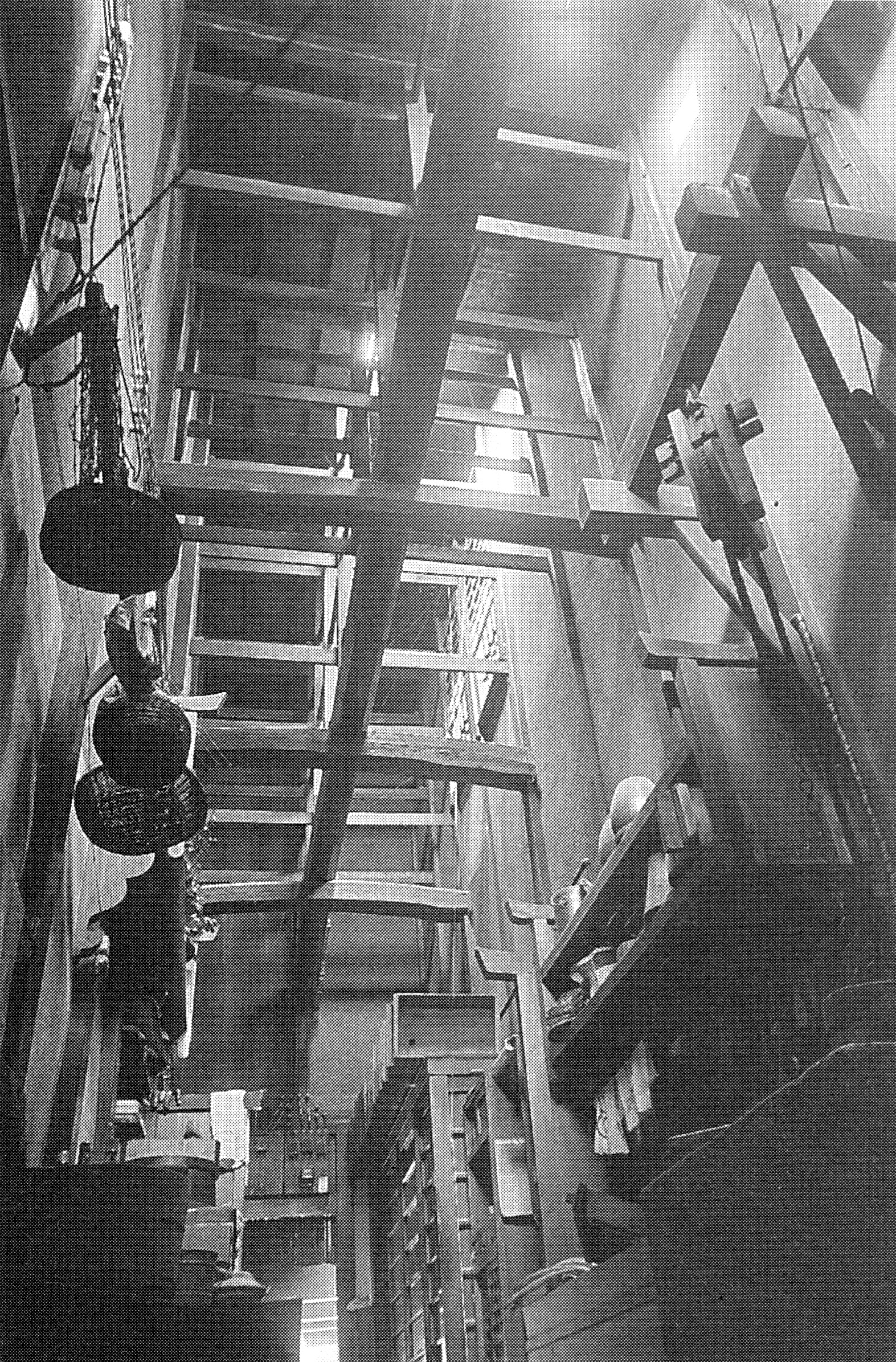
Hibukuro over the tōriniwa

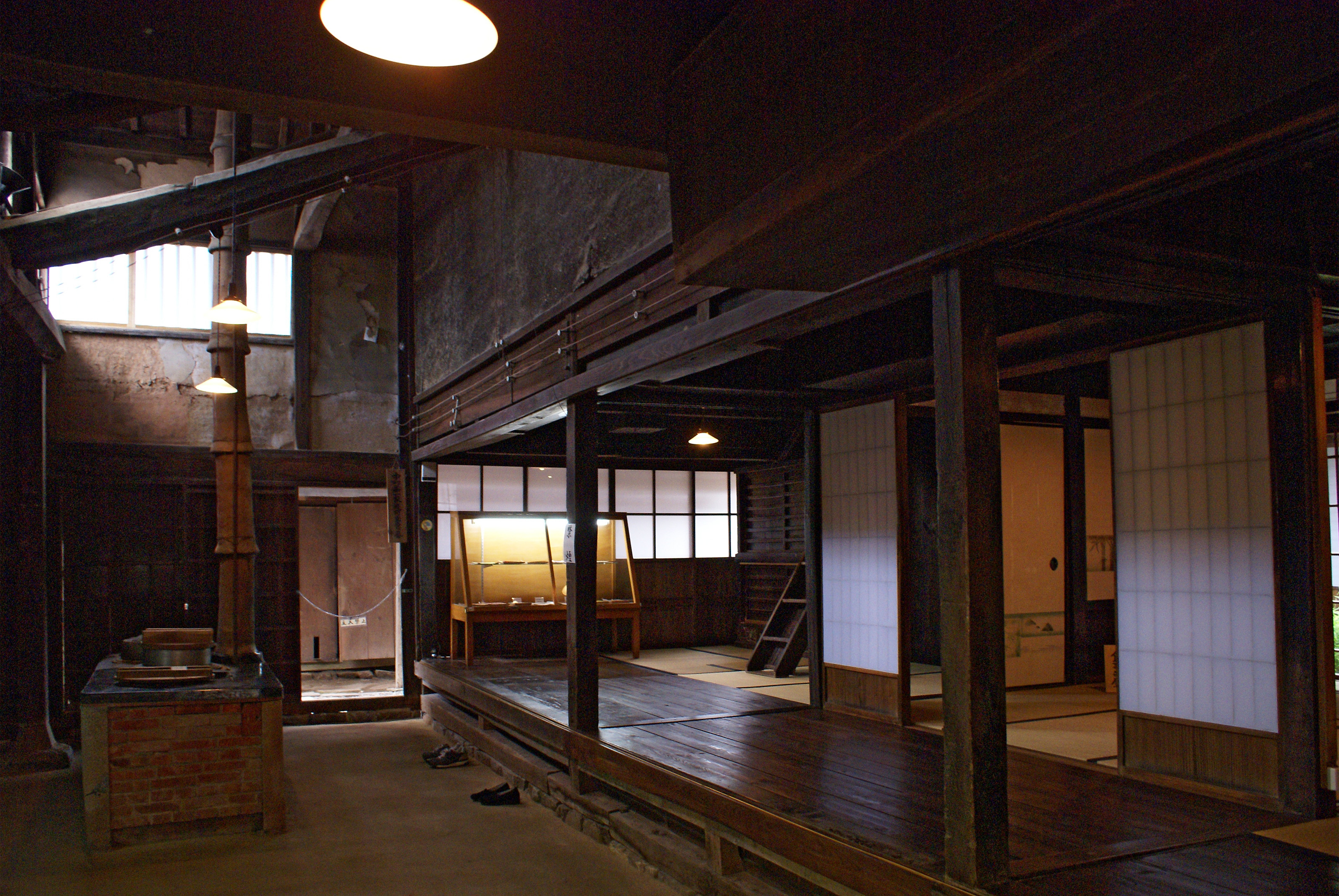
View from tōriniwa over the wood-floored engawa into the row of rooms alongside

Machiya in Kyoto, sometimes called kyōmachiya (京町家/京町屋), formed the defining characteristic of downtown Kyoto architecture for centuries, representing the standard defining form of the machiya throughout the country.

The typical Kyoto machiya is a long wooden home with narrow street frontage, stretching deep into the city block and often containing one or more small courtyard gardens, known as tsuboniwa. Machiya incorporate earthen walls and baked tile roofs, and are typically one, one and a half or two stories high, occasionally stretching to three stories. The front of the building traditionally served as the retail or shop space, known as mise no ma (店の間, lit. 'shop space'), typically having sliding or folding shutters that could open to display goods and wares. The plot's width was traditionally an index of wealth, and typical machiya plots would be just 5.4 to 6 metres (18 to 20 ft) wide but 20 metres (66 ft) deep, leading to the nickname unagi no nedoko (鰻の寝床), or 'eel beds'.

Behind the shop space, the remainder of the main building would be divided into the kyoshitsu-bu (居室部, lit. 'living room'), composed of divided rooms with raised timber floors and tatami mats coverings. Machiya would also feature a doma (土間) or tōriniwa (通り庭), an unfloored earthen service space that contained the kitchen, also serving as the passage to the rear of the plot, where storehouses known as kura (倉/蔵) would be found.

A hibukuro (火袋) above the kitchen would serve as a chimney, carrying smoke and heat away, and also serve as a skylight, bringing light into the kitchen.

The largest residential room in a machiya, located in the rear of the main building and looking out over the garden which separated the main house from the storehouse, was known as the zashiki (座敷), and doubled as a reception room for special guests or clients. The sliding doors which made up the walls in a machiya, as in most traditional Japanese buildings, provided a great degree of versatility; doors could be opened and closed or removed entirely to alter the number, size, and shape of rooms to suit the needs of the moment. Typically, however, the remainder of the building might be arranged to create smaller rooms, including an entrance hall or foyer (genkan (玄関)), butsuma (仏間), (Note: Japanese families, particularly in more traditional homes, typically have a small Buddhist altar within the home, often surrounded with or located near photos of deceased family members. When this is located in its own separate room, that room is called a butsuma, or "Buddha space.") naka no ma (中の間) and oku no ma (奥の間), both of which mean simply 'central room'.

One occasion when rooms would be altered significantly is during the Gion Matsuri, when families would display their family treasures, including byōbu (folding screen) paintings and other artworks and heirlooms in the machiya. Machiya also provided space for costumes, decorations, portable shrines (omikoshi (御神輿)), floats, and other things needed for the festival, as well as hosting spectators along the festival's parade route.

The design of a machiya was also well-suited for the climate of Kyoto; with cold winters and often exceedingly-hot, humid summers, multiple layers of sliding doors (fusuma and shōji) could be added or removed to moderate the temperature inside; closing all the screens in the winter would offer some protection from the cold, while opening them all in the summer offered some respite from the heat and humidity.

Machiya homes traditionally also made use of different types of screens which would be changed with the seasons; woven bamboo screens used in summer allowed air to flow through, but helped to block the sun. The open air garden courtyards likewise aided in air circulation and brought light into the house.

=== Design elements ===
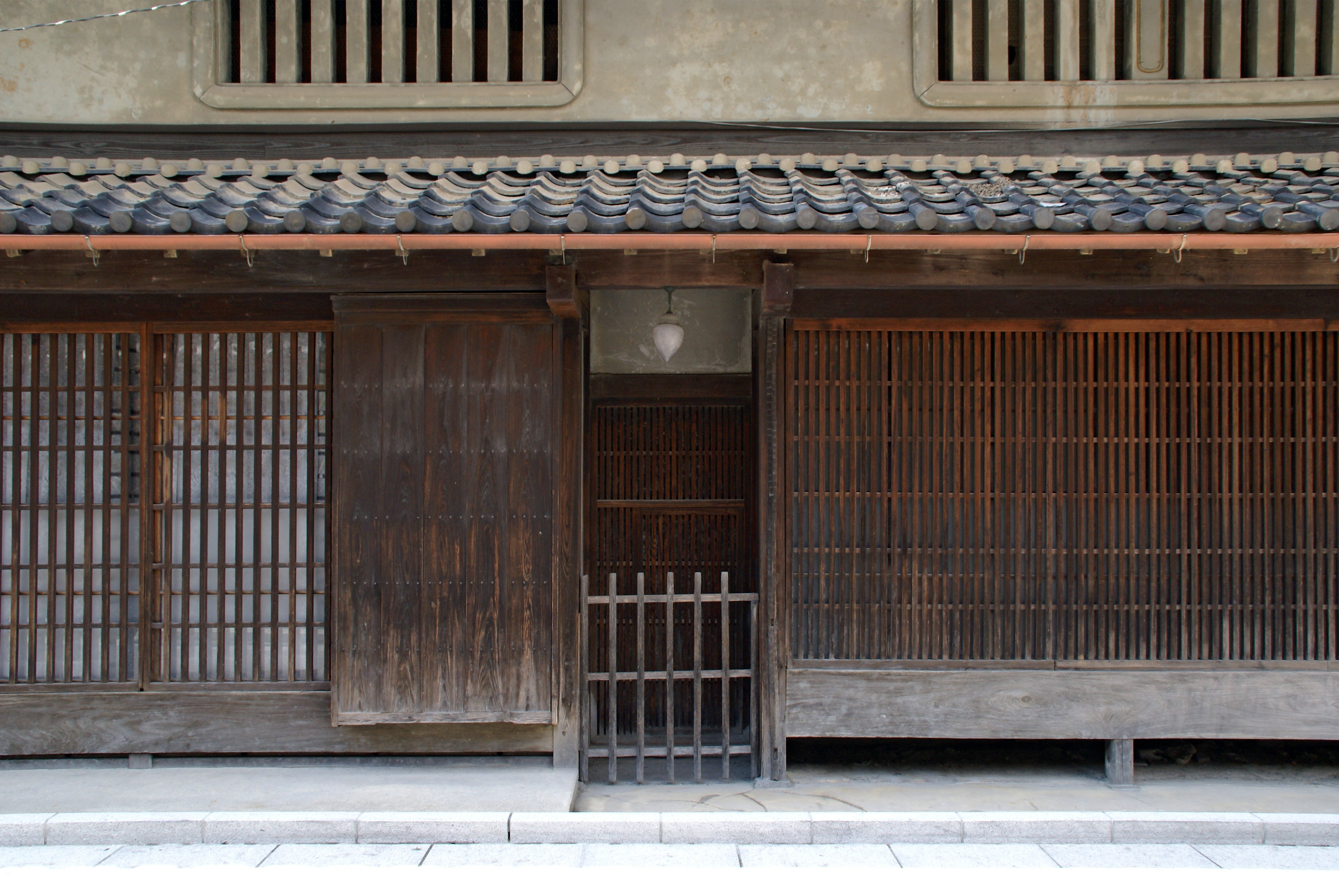
Façade of a shop in the historic Matsuyama merchant quarter of Uda city, Nara prefecture; an example of machiya design, featuring kōshi latticework on the ground floor, earthwork walls on the second story with mushikomado windows and clay roof tiles

The front of a machiya features wooden lattices, or kōshi (格子), the styles of which were once indicative of the type of shop the machiya held. Silk or thread shops, rice sellers, okiya (geisha houses), and liquor stores, among others, each had their own distinctive style of latticework. The types or styles of latticework are still today known by names using shop types, such as itoya-gōshi (糸屋格子, lit. 'thread shop lattice') or komeya-gōshi (米屋格子, lit. 'rice shop lattice'). These lattices sometimes jut out from the front of the building, in which case they are known as degōshi (出格子). Normally unpainted, the kōshi of hanamachi (geisha and oiran communities) were frequently painted in bengara (紅殻), a vermillion or red ochre color.

The façade of the second story of a machiya is generally not made of wood, but of earthwork, with a distinctive style of window known as mushiko mado (虫籠窓, lit. 'insect cage window').

The main entrance into a machiya consists of two doors. The ō-do (大戸, lit. 'big door') was generally used only to transport goods, or large objects, into the building, while the smaller kugurido (潜り戸), or 'side door', was for normal, everyday use, i.e. for people to enter and exit.

Machiya often contain small courtyard gardens.

=== Community ===
Machiya communities can be compared to the hutongs of Beijing. Small neighborhoods made up of closely grouped homes organized on both sides of a narrow street, sometimes with small alleyways (roji (路地)) in between the homes, help to create a strong sense of community. In addition, many areas were traditionally defined by a single craft or product. The Nishijin neighborhood, for example, is famous for its textiles; sharing a craft contributed greatly to a sense of community among fellow textile merchants in this area.

=== Destruction ===
Machiya, despite their status as part of Japan's cultural heritage, have undergone rapid decline in numbers in recent decades, with many being demolished in order to provide space for new buildings. Many reasons for this decline exist; machiya are considered to be difficult and expensive to maintain, are subject to greater risk of damage from fires or earthquakes than modern buildings, and are considered old-fashioned and outdated by some. In a survey conducted in 2003, over 50% of machiya residents noted that it is financially difficult to maintain a machiya.

Between 1993 and 2003, over 13% of the machiya in Kyoto were demolished. Roughly forty percent of those demolished were replaced with new modern houses, and another 40% were replaced with high-rise apartment buildings, parking lots, or modern-style commercial shops. Of those machiya remaining, over 80% have suffered significant losses to the traditional appearance of their façades. Roughly 20% of Kyoto's machiya have been altered in a process called lit. 'signboard architecture' (看板建築, kanban kenchiku), retaining the basic shape of a machiya, but their façades have been completely covered over in cement, which replaces the wooden lattices of the first story and mushikomado windows and earthwork walls of the second story. Many of these kanban kenchiku machiya have also lost their tile roofs, becoming more boxed-out in shape; many have also had aluminum or steel shutters installed, as are commonly seen in small urban shops around the world.

In response to the decline in machiya numbers, however, some groups have formed with the express aim of restoring and protecting the machiya found in Kyoto. One such institution, the Machiya Machizukuri Fund, (Note: Machizukuri (まちづくり) could be translated as 'town construction' or 'community building'.) was established in 2005 with the backing of a Tokyo-based benefactor. The group works alongside individual machiya owners to restore their buildings and to have them designated as "Structures of Scenic Importance" (景観重要建造物, keikan jūyō kenzōbutsu); (Note: This could also be translated as "Structures of Skyline Importance" or "Structures of Scenic Importance.") under this designation, the structures are protected from demolition without the permission of the mayor of Kyoto, and a stipend is provided by the city government to the owners of the machiya to help support the upkeep of the building. Many of these restored buildings serve, at least in part, as community centers.

Iori, a company founded by art collector, writer, and cultural activist Alex Kerr in 2004 to save old machiya, owns a number of machiya which it restored, maintains, and rents to travelers. The company's main office, itself located in a machiya, houses a traditional arts practice space, including a full-size Noh stage.

== Examples ==
Traditional wooden townhouse (machiya) with lattice windows, Tsuruga

There are many machiya remaining in Kyoto. Many are private residences, while others operating as businesses, notably cafes, and a few are museums. The largest machiya in Kyoto is Sumiya in Shimabara, the traditional yūkaku (遊廓/遊郭, lit. 'pleasure quarter') of Kyoto.

== See also ==
- Minka
- Kura
- Terraced houses
