= Kura (storehouse) =

Japanese traditional storehouse

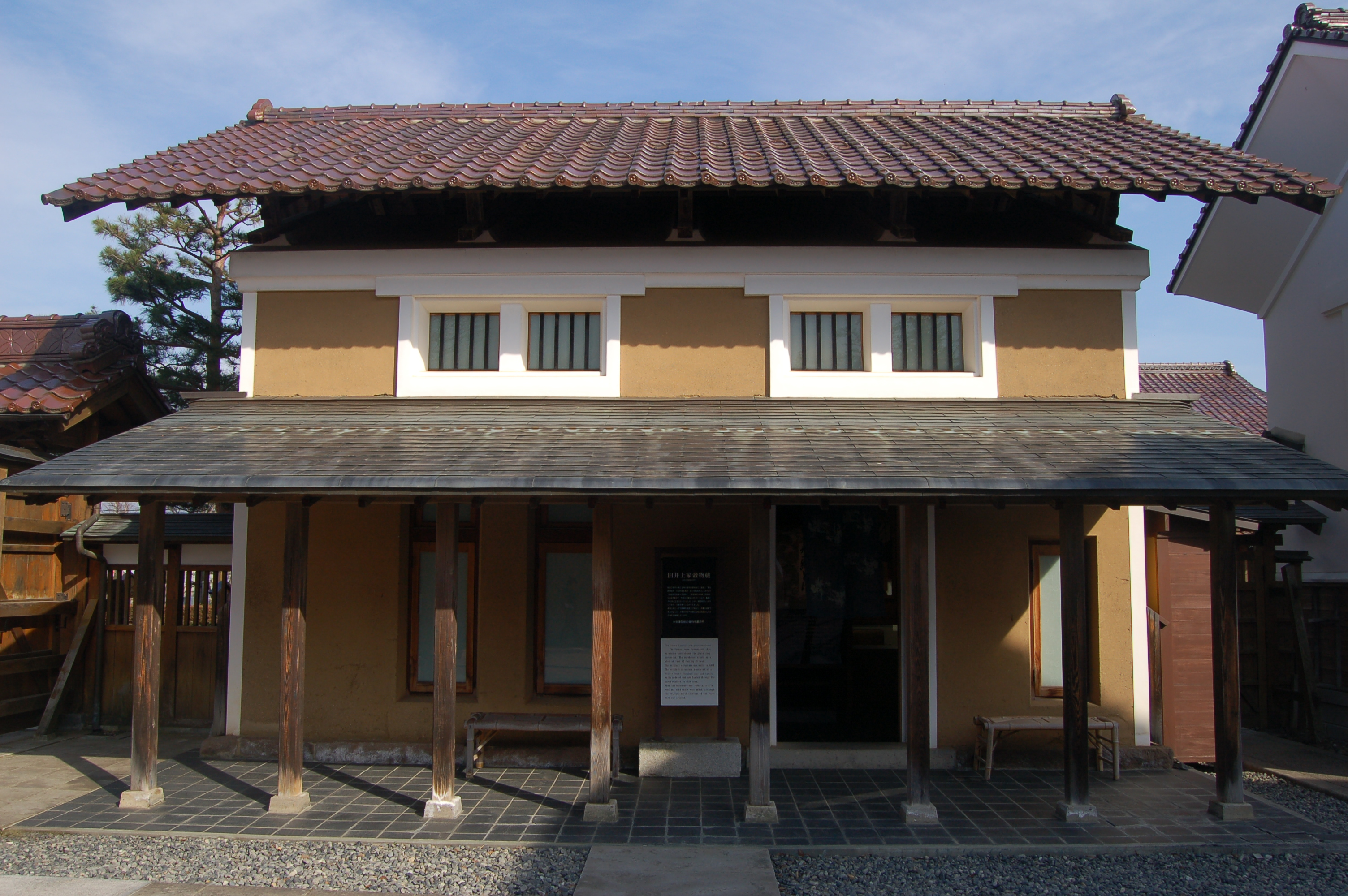
Traditional earthen kura that has been converted into a cafe

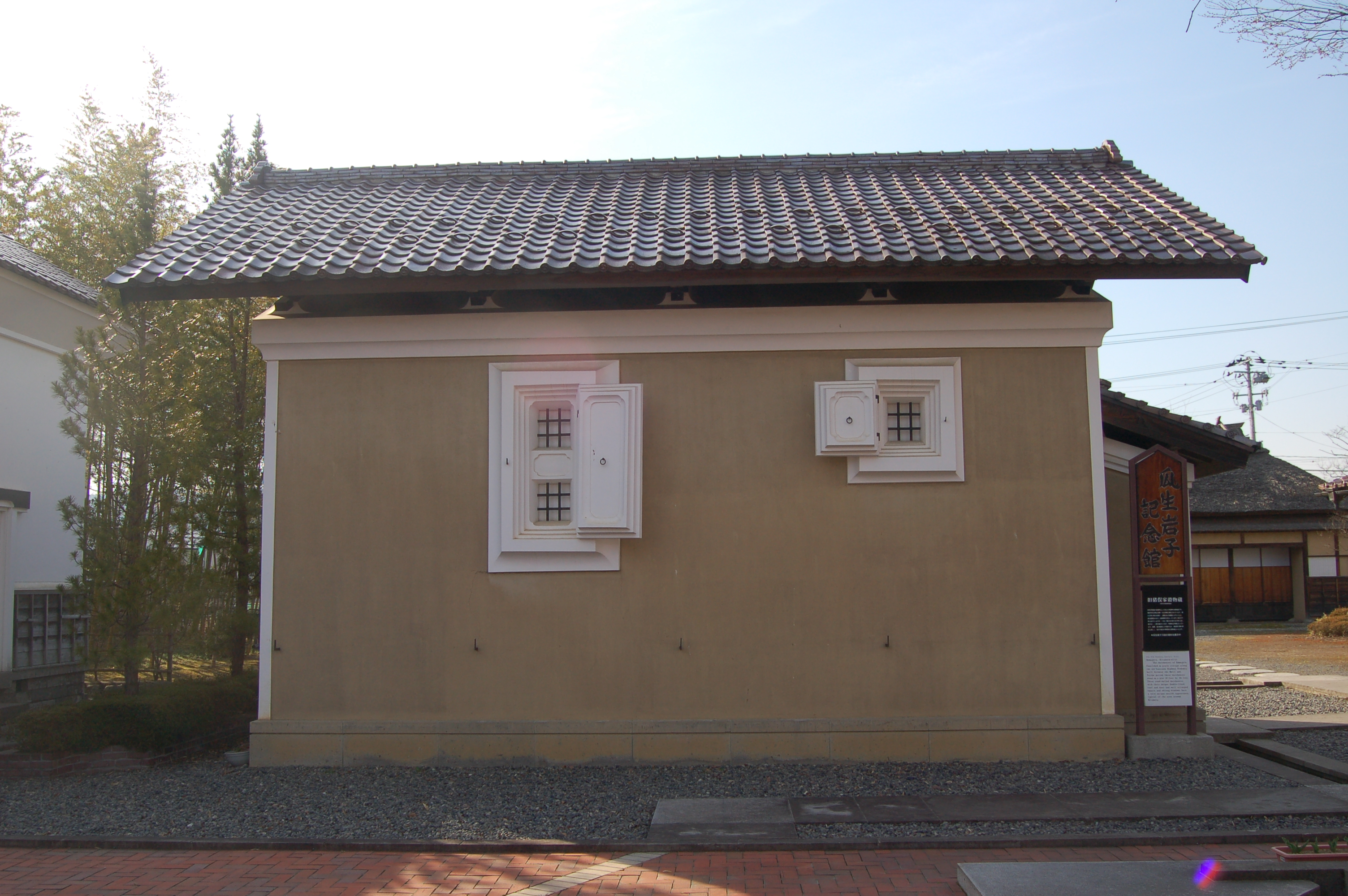
Kura storehouse in Kitakata with tiled roof

Kura (倉 or 蔵) are traditional Japanese storehouses. They are commonly durable buildings built from timber, stone or clay used to safely store valuable commodities.

Kura in rural communities are normally of simpler construction and used for storing grain or rice. Those in towns are more elaborate, with a structural timber frame covered in a fireproof, clay outer coating. Early religious kura were built in a "log cabin" style, whilst those used later to store gunpowder were constructed from stone.

Earthen kura, dozō have evolved a particular set of construction techniques in order to make them relatively fireproof.

== History ==
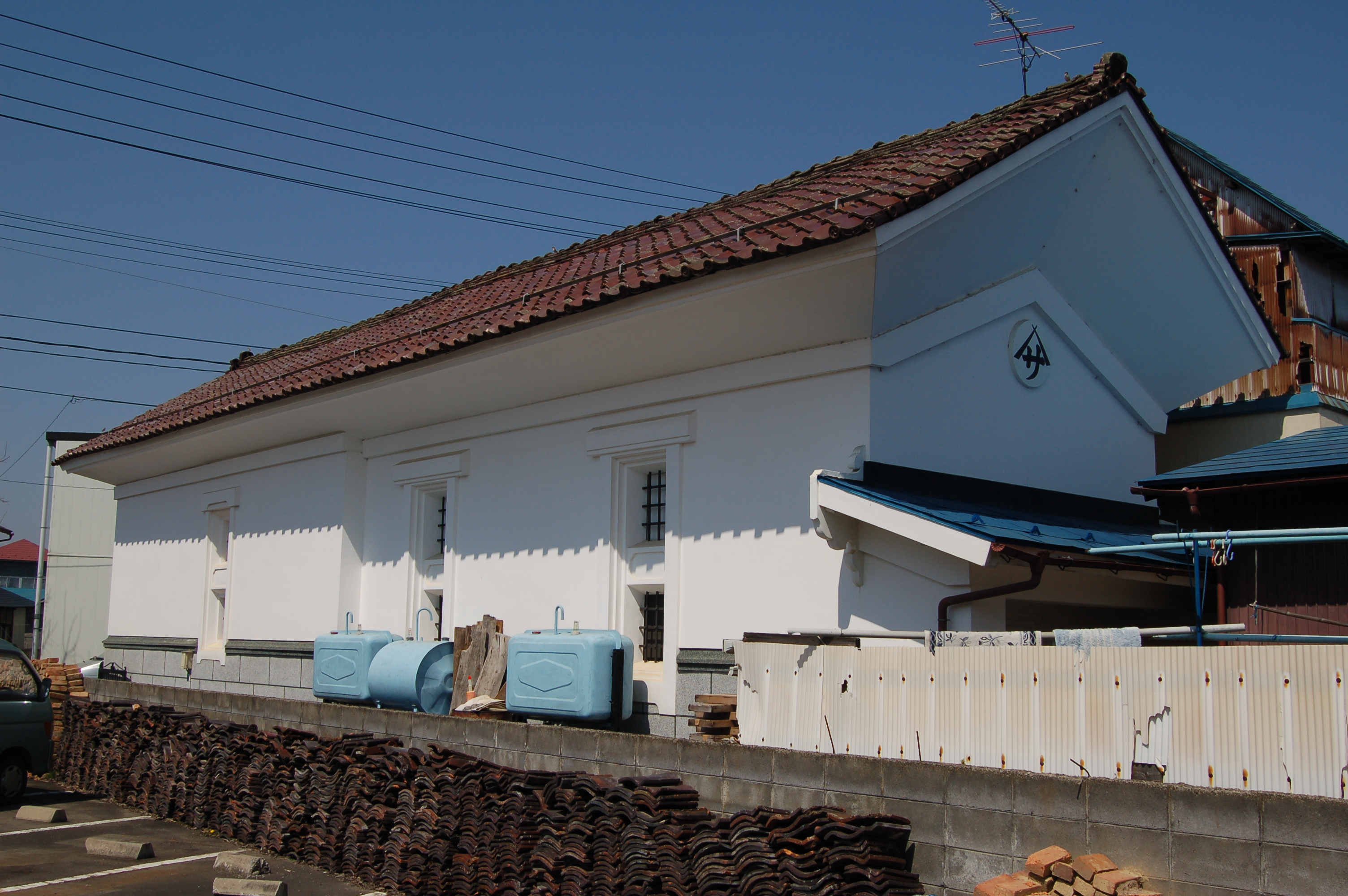
Kura in Kitakata illustrating protective plasterwork at eaves level

The kura was used to store precious items. Other sorts of storehouses, such as outbuildings (naya) and sheds (koya), were used to store more mundane items. The first kura appeared during the Yayoi period (300 BCE – 300 CE), and they evolved into takakura "tall storehouses", which were raised off the ground on columns and reached via ladder. They were prevalent on the Ryukyu Islands and Amami Ōshima.

During the Nara period (710–794), the government taxed the country in rice, and kura were frequently used to store it. After the introduction of Buddhism in Japan, kura were often used to store religious items, such as sūtra scrolls.

In a domestic situation, traditional Japanese houses had limited storage space. Frequently, the sliding fusuma used to divide rooms was also used to create storage space; otherwise, there was limited storage under the kitchen, and sometimes an attic space was formed in the roof. Although a few possessions may have been displayed, available storage was frequently taken up by things like futons that were folded away each morning. In addition, many families possessed a wide array of accoutrements required for festivals and these needed to be stored somewhere safe when not in use. Traditional houses were built of timber and prone to destruction by fire, so a more durable solution was required to store precious items.

Earthen kura often served as status symbols; the more kura, the greater the wealth. This led some merchants to build three-story kura. Due to Kitakata, Fukushima's historic prominence of being the nation's "city of kura" and storehouse of preservable goods, it has been said by locals that "one who doesn't own a kura by the time they are 40 is not yet a man".

== Types ==
=== Log cabin kura ===
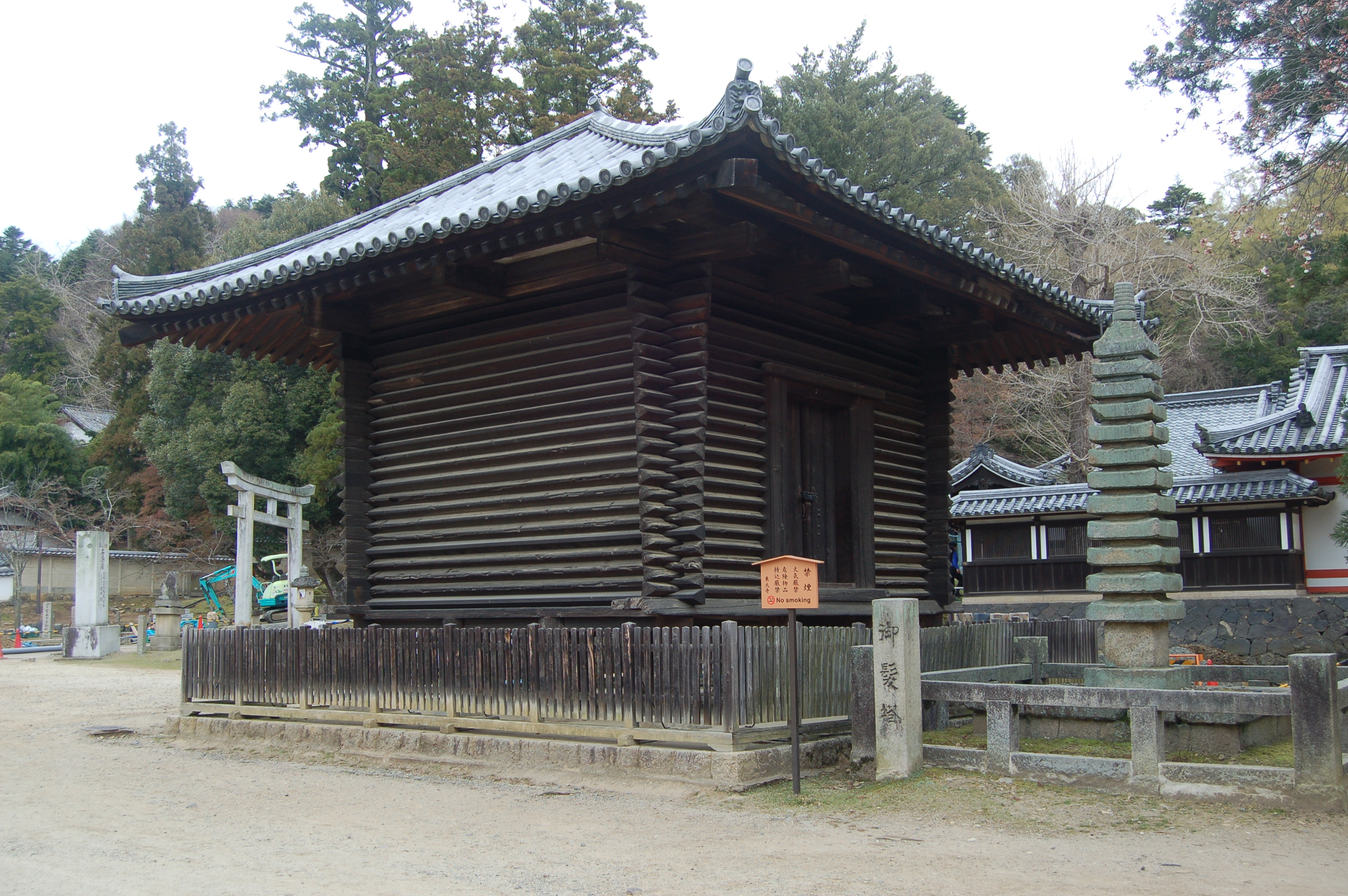
Log cabin style kura in Nara

Azekura (校倉, literally intersecting storehouse) have descended in style from the Yayoi period when triangular section logs were used for building. Historic examples have been preserved within the compounds of Buddhist temples and Shintō shrines. The most famous examples are the Shōsōin at Tōdai-ji in Nara, and storehouses at the Tōshōdai-ji in Nara and the Itsukushima Shrine in Hiroshima. These kura have all been dedicated to storing religious and cultural treasures.

The timbers used in these kura were thicker than other types of wooden storehouses so they were generally more durable, however, they were vulnerable to fire and relied upon separation from adjoining buildings to provide the best fire protection. As such they were unsuitable for urban situations. Roofs were either thatched or covered in cypress bark.

When the Buddhists arrived in Japan they brought the knowledge of using plaster walls with them. However the azekura style continued to be used because it denoted the wealth of the patron. The owner had to firstly have enough possessions to merit building one, the timber used was expensive and they had to own enough land to suitably situate them from other buildings. Eventually this raised log structure gained a religious significance, and the style of domestic kura moved elsewhere.

=== Board-wall kura ===
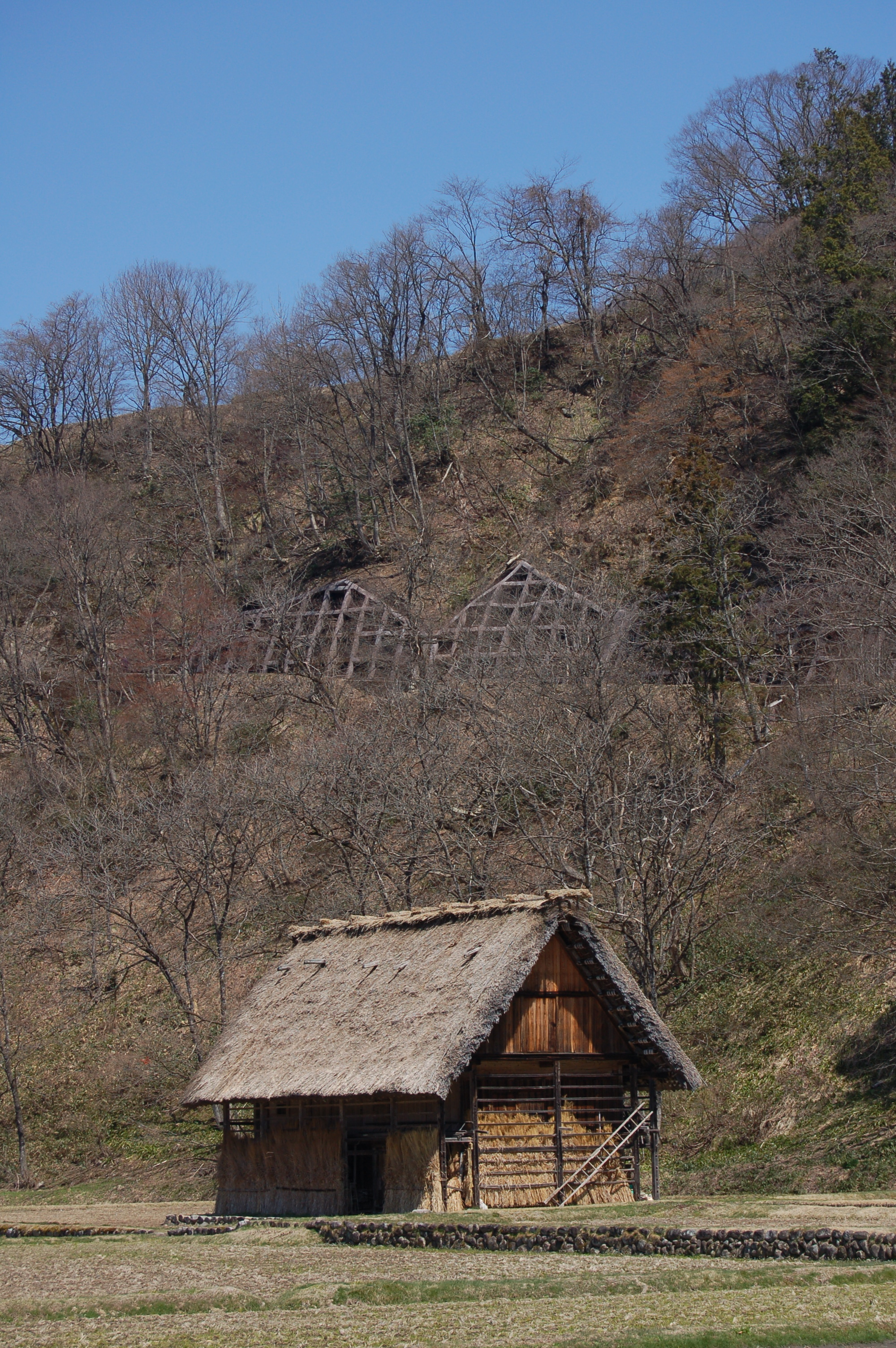
Boarded wall kura in Shirakawa village, Gifu

Board-wall kura were traditionally built in farming communities. Like the azekura above they were vulnerable to fire and were built some distance from other farm buildings. Examples can still be found in the village of Shirakawa in Gifu.

They are constructed from a grid of heavy timbers laid to form a foundation, with posts and braces forming bracing for the walls. The interior walls are lined with heavy boards fixed on the inner side. In the case of the kura in Shirakawa, the roofs are thatched in a similar manner to gasshō-zukuri. Traditionally grain was stored on the ground floor with household items stored on the upper floor.

=== Stone kura ===
There are two types of stone kura ishigura (石倉). The first has structural stone walls and a roof constructed by stacking stone blocks; the second is a wooden structure around which stone is placed for fire protection.

The former were primarily built during the Edo period and used to store firearms and ammunition, such as the one at Osaka Castle, which has walls 1.9m thick.

Remains of houses on the island of Dejima in Nagasaki built by Dutch traders in the Edo Period employed the latter method, with a wooden structure faced with stone.

Kura in the vicinity of the Ōya quarry near Utsunomiya, Tochigi had roofs made from Ōya stone. This inexpensive tufa is soft and easily carved, yet waterproof. It was later used by Frank Lloyd Wright on the Imperial Hotel, Tokyo. Nikkō stone, obtained from the same quarry as Ōya stone, has a finer grain and was often used for ornamentation on the exterior of kura.

=== Earthen kura ===
Earthen dozō (土蔵) kura are a common sight in Japan, and the basic form is normally seen with only minor variations. The basic wood-framed, plaster-walled, tiled-roof design maintains a stable temperature and humidity throughout the year. Personal belongings kept in this type of kura tended to be kept in beautifully crafted wooden chests called tansu that would be located on a raised floor or balcony within.

Although they became more popular in the Edo period (1603–1868), references to them are found in the Heian period (794–1185) where statutes were written to govern the distances between kura in towns in order to prevent the spread of fire.

== Construction of the earthen kura ==
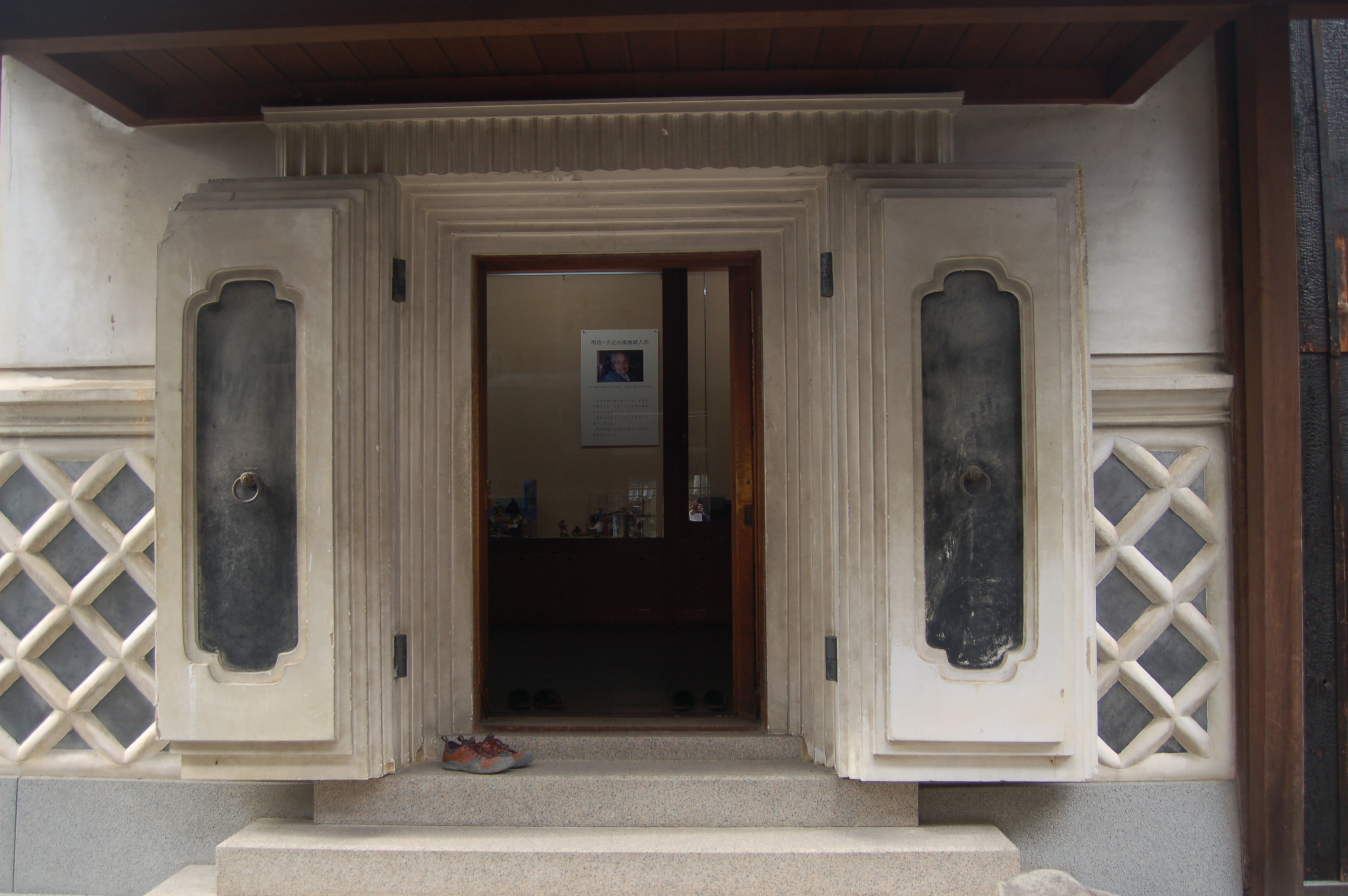
Detail of an outer door and namako tiling on a kura in Tsuyama on the Izumo Kaido road

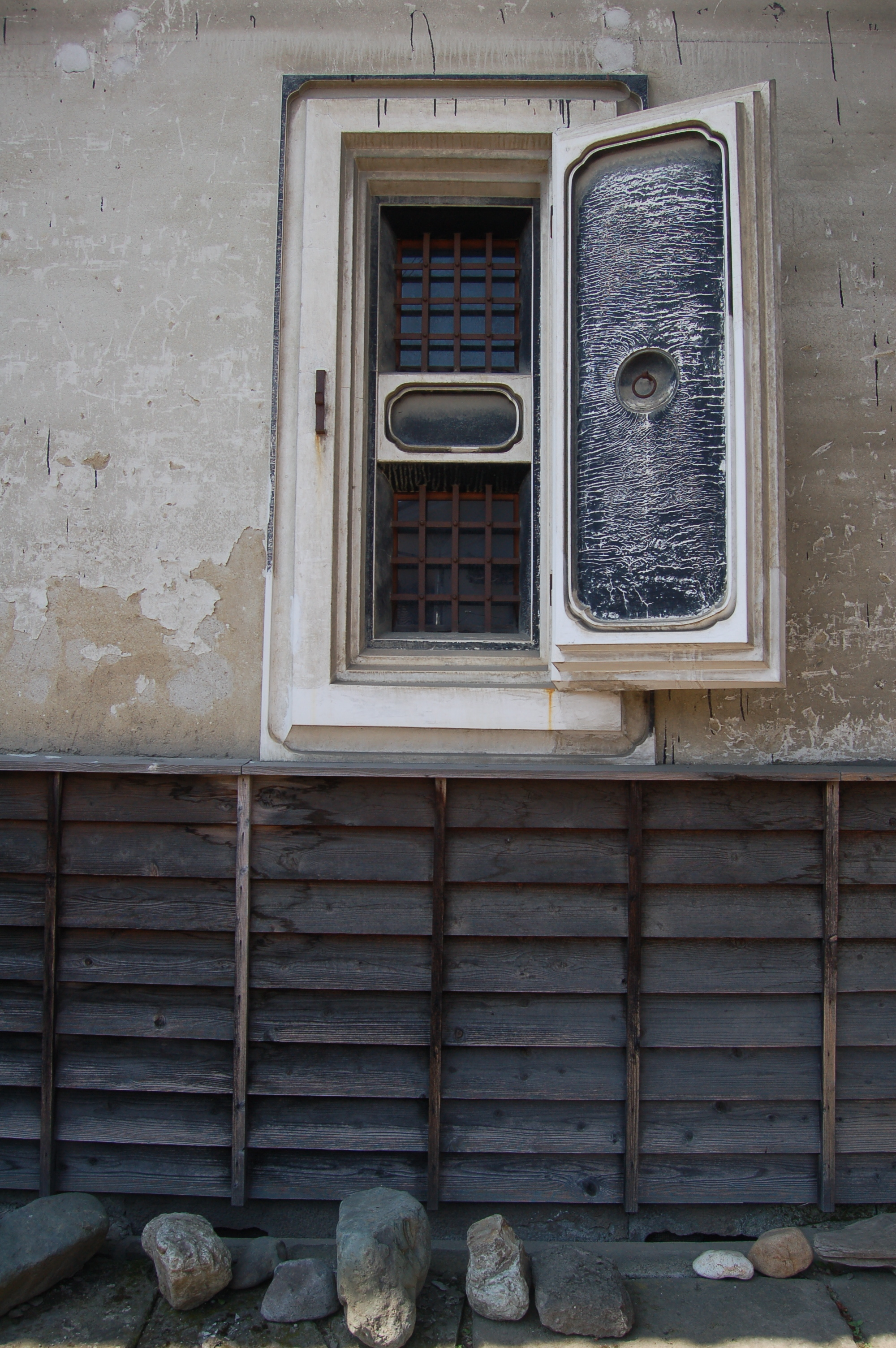
Kura in Kitakata illustrating stepped window shutters

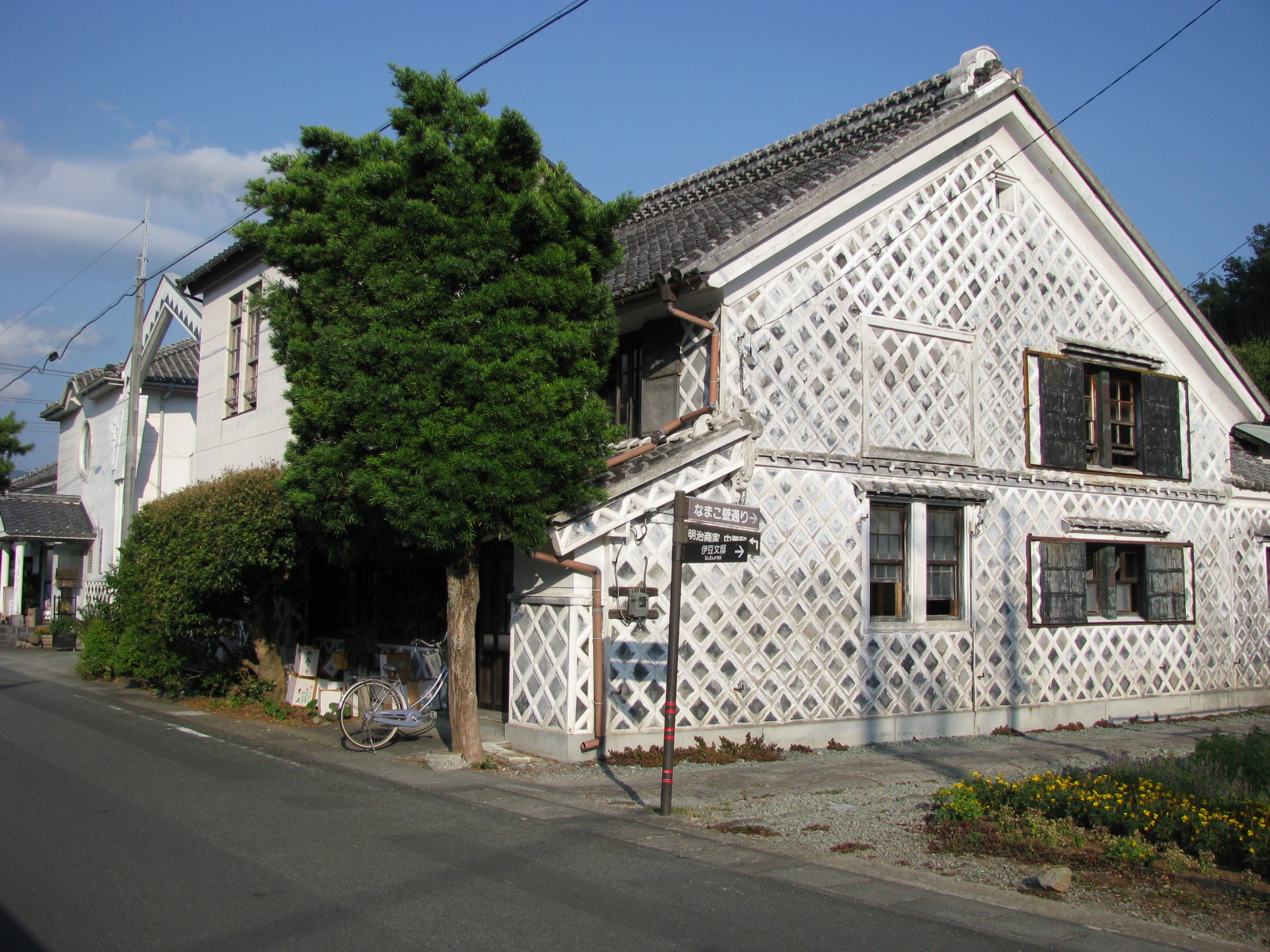
Photo showing horizontal courses of mizukiri over the windows

Most traditional earthen kura have a wooden frame base onto which bamboo lathing and palm fibre was affixed. The internal walls were covered with layers of clay and finished with a plaster top coat. The outer walls covered the structural timbers and were more crucial for fireproofing. These were commonly covered first in bamboo lath followed by several applications of clay applied in a complex and laborious process. There were sometimes as many as 24 layers applied.

Although the application of the clay helps to make the kura fireproof, it is prone to damage both from physical sources and from rain. Some kura used tiles at the base of the external wall. These were laid either horizontally or diagonally and were fixed with plaster dabs. The joints were thick and protruding, with a rounded top, and because they reminded people of namako (sea cucumber) they became known as namako walls. Tiles were also sometimes used in horizontal courses set at an angle to the wall (especially over window openings). These were called mizukiri (meaning water cutters) and were used to throw water off the facade to increase the durability of the wall.

The protective fireproofing continues on the top of the kura by forming an inner roof covered in the same way as the walls. The timbers for the outer roof then sit on a fireproof box. The outer roof was used to protect the clay finish from rain. In rural areas this outer roof was often constructed of thatch which would burn off in the event of a fire. However, due to their relatively short lifespan and complexity in replacing, thatch roofs are becoming a rarity. In towns the roofs were usually tiled. To prevent fire from destroying the roof timbers supporting the outer roof, the eaves were sometimes thickened up with the plaster coating and extended to the underside of the tiles.

Earthen kura usually have double door entrances consisting of a thick plaster outer and thin inner door leaf. The outer perimeter of each door leaf has a series of steps that correspond with similar ones on the frame. These steps are called jabara and they make it more difficult for fire to enter the kura when they are closed. The inner door was often a sliding door made of wood and covered with painted plaster on the outside.

Windows were often situated high up in the kura and were frequently left open to provide ventilation, although there were often iron bar grilles to prevent theft. Windows were often formed in a similar way as doors with a stepped perimeter. When a fire broke out both the doors and the windows were closed and their edges were covered over in plaster.

In some cases the kura were raised off the ground to prevent vermin and insects from entering. This raised position also helped cool the interior.

== Regional variations ==
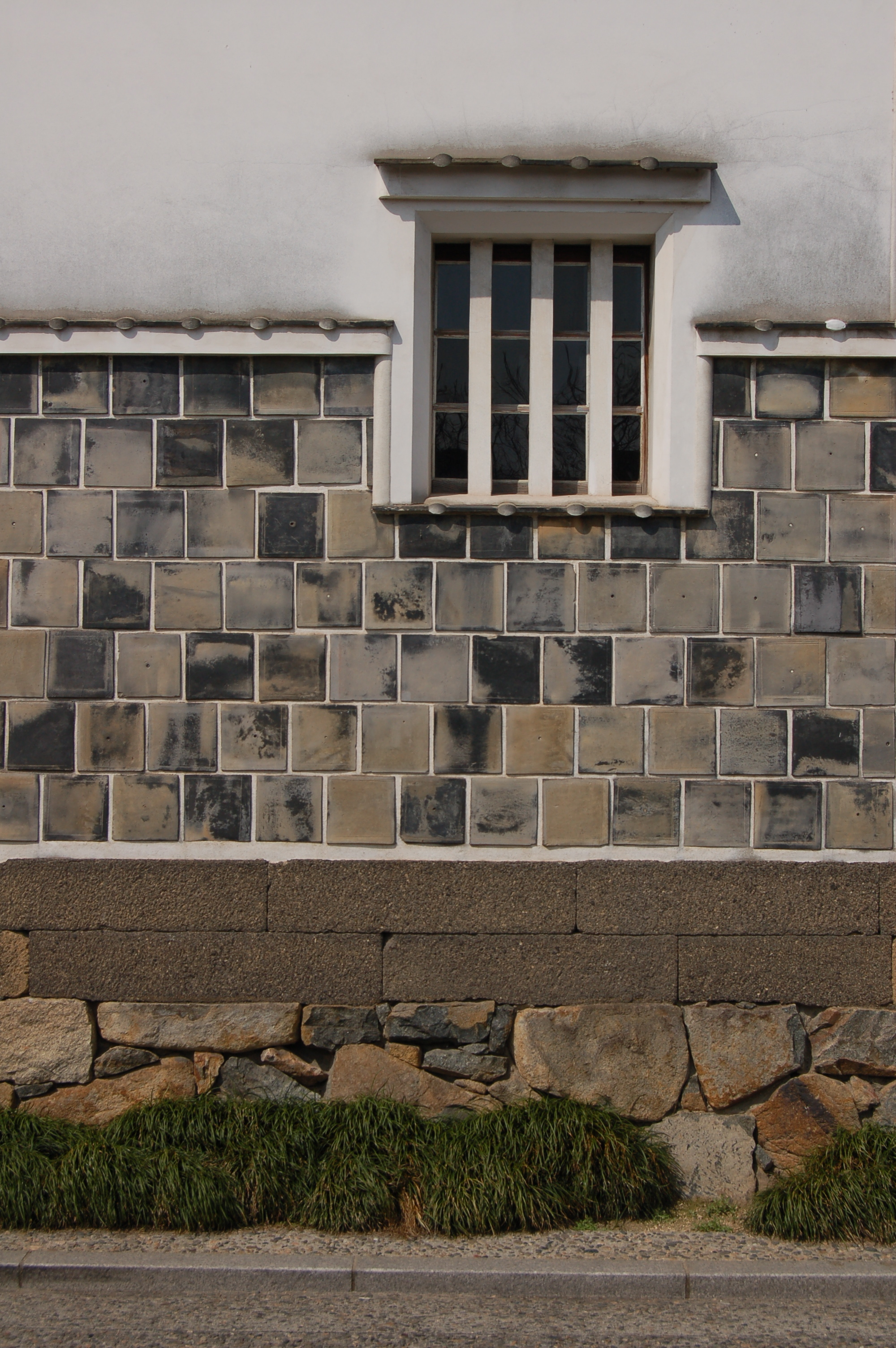
Kura in Kurashiki showing tiling to the base of the wall laid horizontally in a manner typical to the area.

In Takayama, Gifu there are three storey kura for storing floats for the Takayama Festival.

Kura in Kurashiki, Okayama, normally have tiles on the lower part of the external wall laid horizontally rather than diagonally.

== See also ==
- Shōsōin azekura style storehouse situated adjacent to the Tōdai-ji temple in Nara
- Minka
- Machiya
- Kitakata, Fukushima (A city in northern Japan with over 2000 kura)
