= Hiyoshigaoka - Akashi Tumuli =

Burial mounds in Japan

- 日吉ヶ丘・明石墳墓群 (Japanese)
- Hiyoshigaoka - Akashi Tumuli Hiyoshigaoka - Akashi Tumuli (Japan)
- Interactive map of Hiyoshigaoka - Akashi Tumuli
- 35°30′20″N 135°06′37″E
- Type: Kofun
- Periods: Yayoi period
- Location: Yosano, Kyoto, Japan
- Region: Kansai region

Site notes
- Public access: Yes (No facilities)

The Hiyoshigaoka - Akashi Tumuli (日吉ヶ丘・明石墳墓群, Hiyoshigaoka Akashi funbo-gun) is a group of late Yayoi to early Kofun period burial mounds, located in the Akeshi neighborhood of the town of Yosano, Kyoto in the Kansai region of Japan. The tumulus group was designated a National Historic Site of Japan in 2005.

== Overview ==
The Hiyoshigaoka - Akashi Tumuli are located in the northern part of Kyoto Prefecture, south of the Tango Peninsula, in a basin called Kaya Valley, surrounded by mountains on three sides except the north. The area contained many large kofun, including the Ebisuyama Kofun and the Tsukuriyama Kofun, which are also National Historic Sites. From 1999, the Kaetsu Town Board of Education conducted a preliminary survey of the Hiyoshigaoka area prior to the construction of municipal housing, and found a large square stone tomb dating from the middle of the Yayoi period.Since 2002, further archaeological excavations have been carried out to confirm the contents of the surrounding tombs. The Higashioka tumulus is located at the end of the hill with an elevation of 20 meters, which extends to the eastern bank of the Noda River. The tumulus measures 32 by 20 meters, and has a remaining height of two meters. It was once surrounded by a moat, and fukiishi were once attached to the upper half of the mound. The presence of embankment has been confirmed in some areas. This tumulus is similar to square Yayoi period tumuli which have been found the in Iwami and Izumo areas, but is much larger. The burial chamber contained a wooden casket slightly south of the center of the mound, and more than 670 tubular beads and red pigments were found at its head. Yayoi pottery found with the grave goods indicated that this tumulus was constructed in the mid-Yayoi period.

The Akashi tumuli cluster is located on a hill behind the Hiyoshigaoka district at an elevation of 40 to 96 meters, and consists of 28 burial mounds dating from the end of the late Yayoi period to the first half of the Kofun period. These tumuli are mostly trapezoidal mounds, with a length of around ten meters. They are constructed along a ridgeline, and were made by carving out a flat surface from the hill, and using the excavated earth to form the tumulus after the burial. Other tumuli are square or oval tombs measuring up to 20 meters on a side. Excavated relics include earthenware and earthenware imitations of daily objects.

The site is about ten minutes by car from Nodagawa Station on the Miyazu Line of the Kyoto Tango Railway.

== See also ==
- List of Historic Sites of Japan (Kyoto)
