= Shirageyama Kofun =

Kofun period burial mound in the Kansai region of Japan

- 白米山古墳 (Japanese)
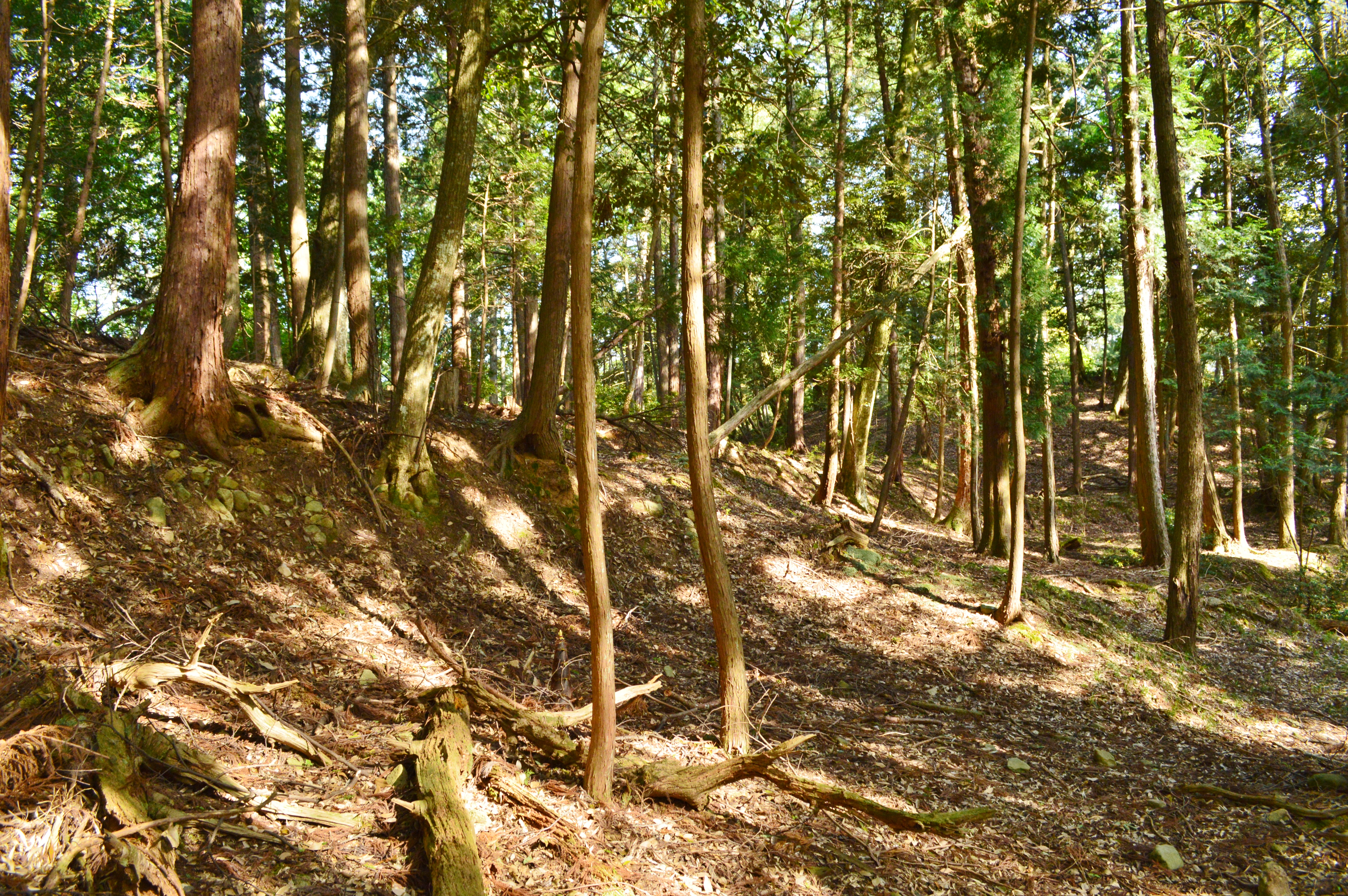
- Shirageyama Kofun

- Shirageyama Kofun Shirageyama Kofun (Japan)
- Interactive map of Shirageyama Kofun
- 35°29′34.40″N 135°06′2.9″E
- Type: Kofun
- Periods: Kofun period
- Location: Yosano, Kyoto, Japan
- Region: Kansai region

History
- Built: c.4th century

Site notes
- Public access: Yes (No facilities)

The Shirageyama Kofun (白米山古墳) is a Kofun period burial mound, located in the Ushirono neighborhood of the town of Yosano, Kyoto in the Kansai region of Japan. The tumulus which was designated a National Historic Site of Japan in 2002.

== Overview ==
The Shirageyama Kofun is located on a small hill with a relative elevation of about 20 meters from the plain, overlooking the middle reaches of the Noda River, which flows into Miyazu Bay, (where Ama-no-Hashidate is located) at the base of the Tango Peninsula in northern Kyoto Prefecture. The Ebisuyama Kofun and Tsukuriyama Kofun are located about 1.5 kilometers to the north. The Shirageyama Kofun is a zenpō-kōen-fun (前方後円墳), which is shaped like a keyhole, having one square end and one circular end, when viewed from above. The tumulus was known since the early twentieth century and was surveyed several times. In 1987, it was designated as a Kyoto Prefectural Historic Site. Due to planned construction work on a bypass for Japan National Route 176 further surveys for the purposes of conserving the site were conducted from 1996 to 1998. The tumulus has an overall length of 90 meters and is orientated to the north. The surface was covered in fukiishi (some of which remains in situ), but trace of haniwa has been found. The burial chamber is a pit-type stone chamber; however, there are also two earthen graves, and one wooden coffin direct burial in the center of the posterior circular portion of the mound. Details of these tombs are uncertain, as a complete archaeological excavation has not taken place. The tumulus is estimated to date from the middle of the early Kofun period, or early 4th century, based on the earthenware found, which makes it one of the oldest on the Sea of Japan coast.

Total length
90 meters:
Anterior rectangular portion
32 meters wide x 5 meters high, 2-tier
Posterior circular portion
54 meter diameter x 7.5 meters high, 2-tiers

== Gallery ==
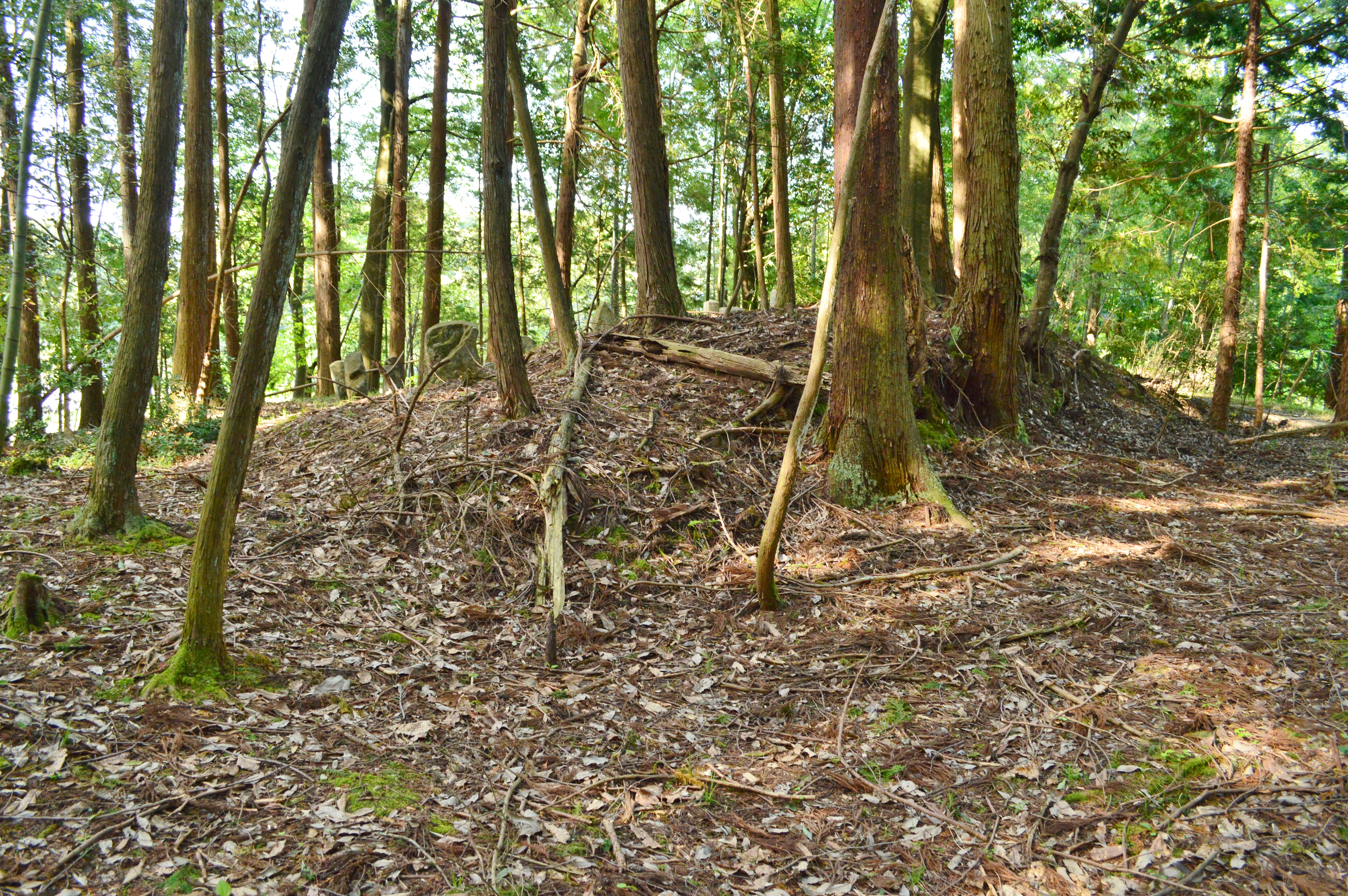

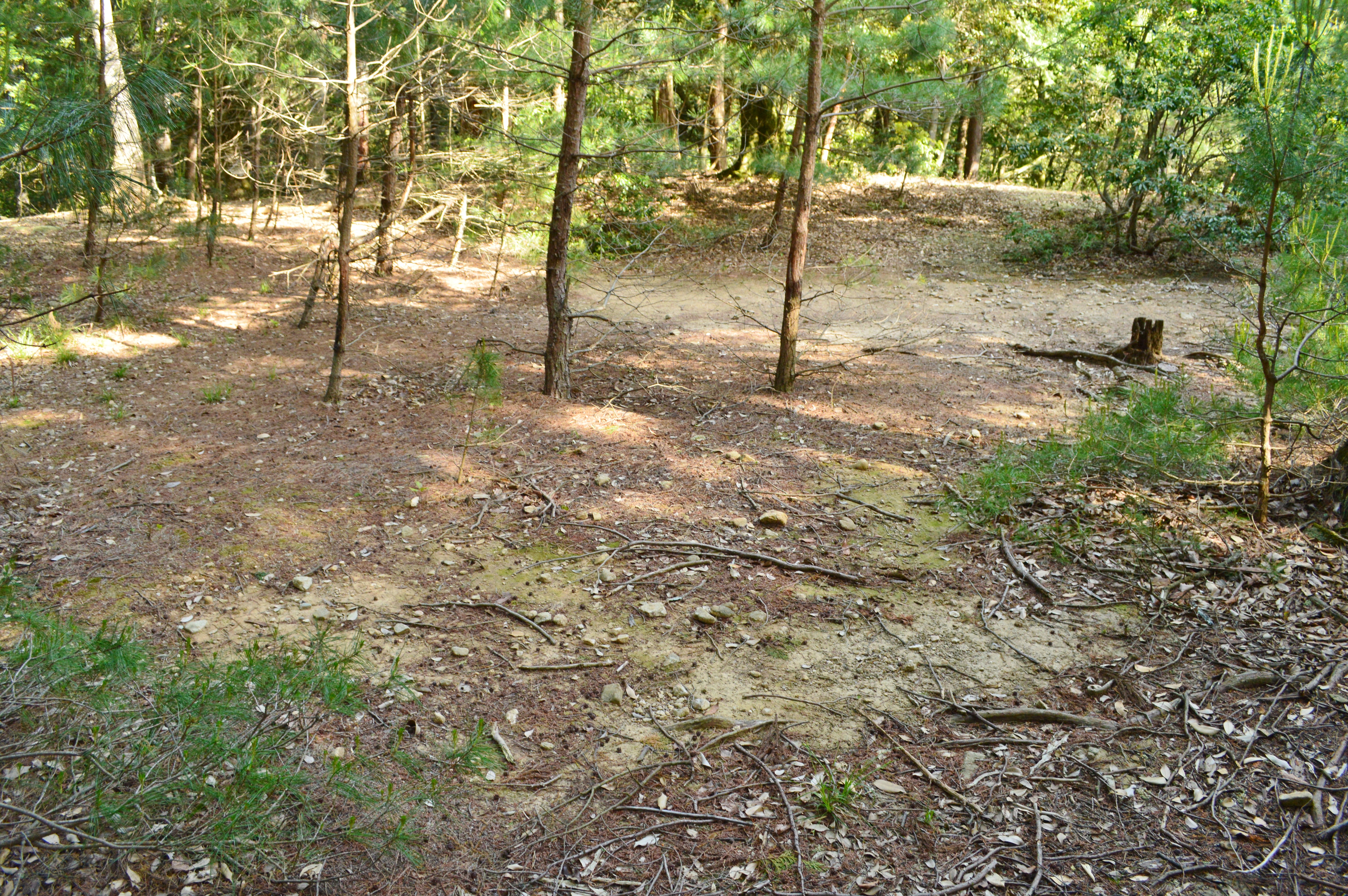

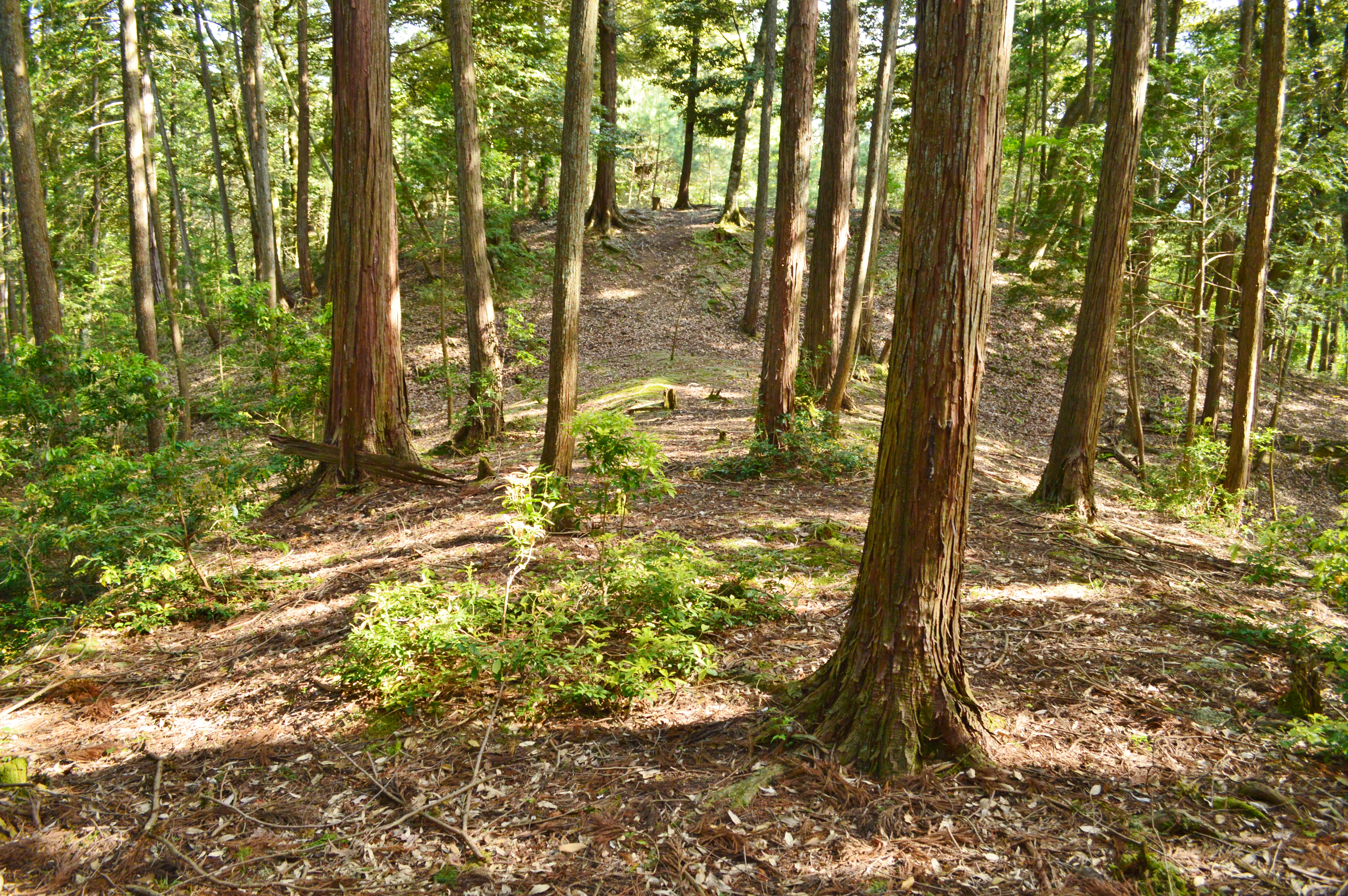

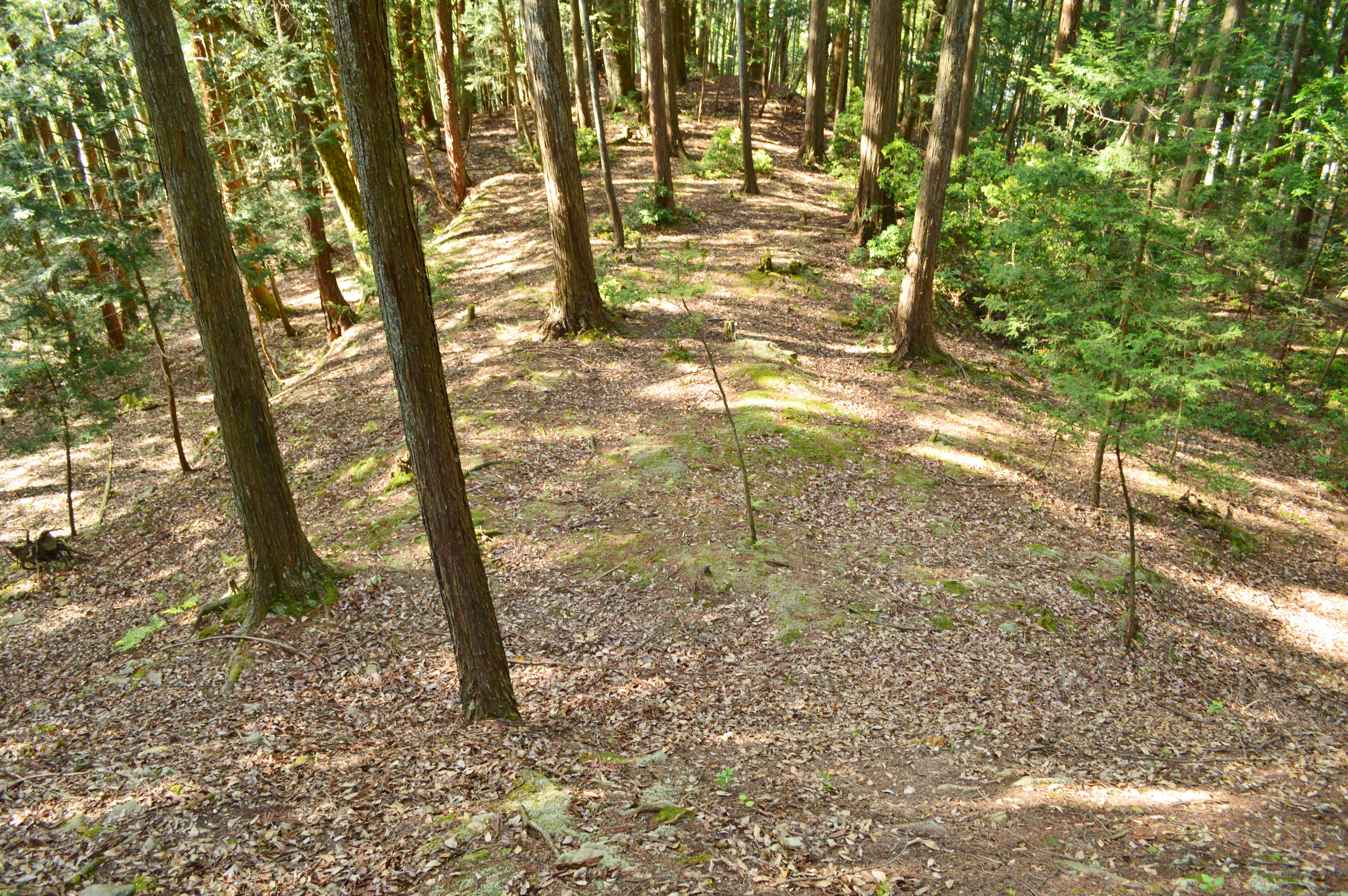

== See also ==
- List of Historic Sites of Japan (Kyoto)
