= Ine-ura =

Coastal settlement in Kyoto Prefecture, Japan

Coordinates: 35°40′33″N 135°17′16″E

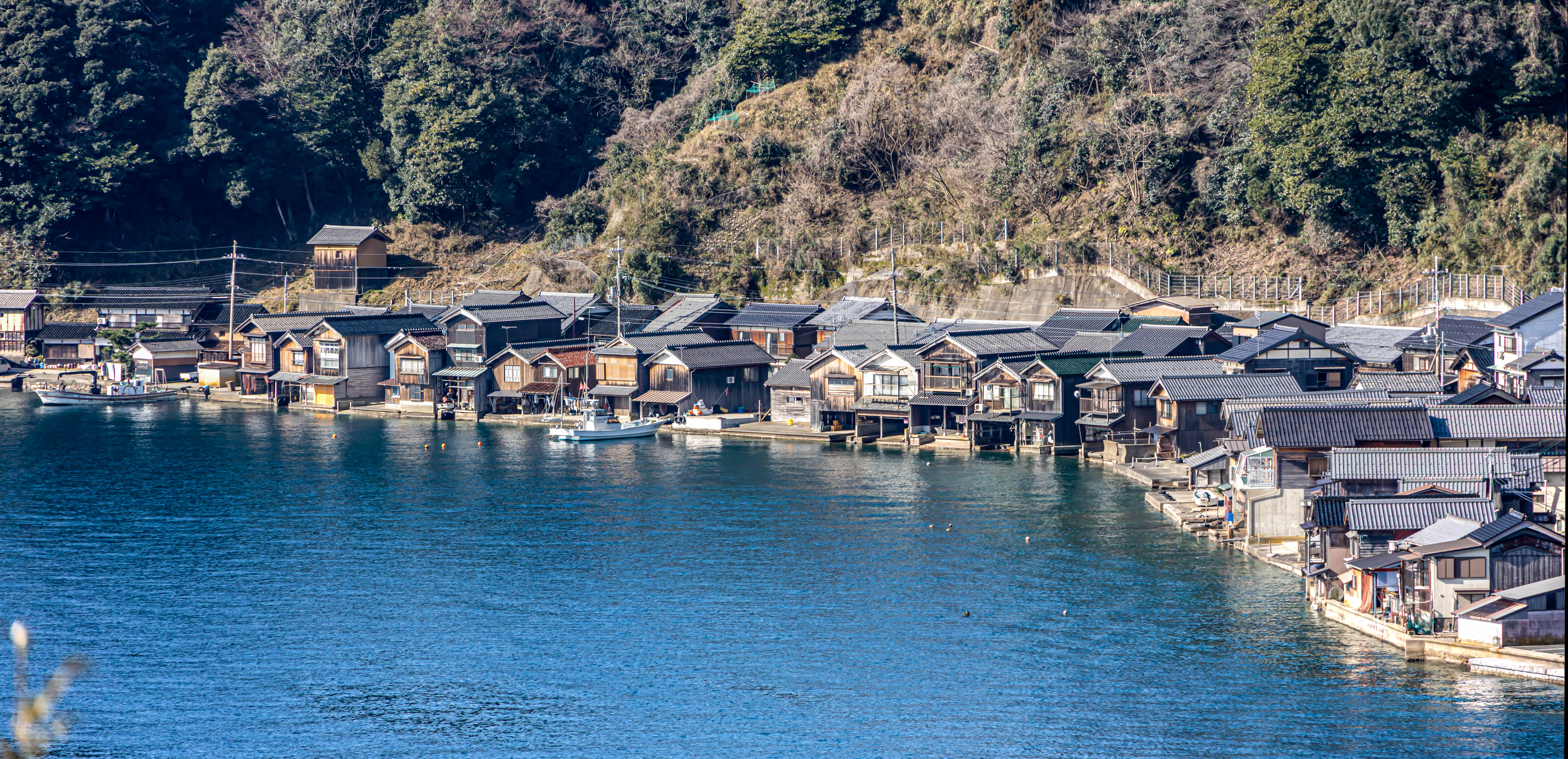
The settlement of Funaya lining the coastline.

Ine-ura (伊根浦) a.k.a. Ine-chō Ine-ura (伊根町伊根浦) is a coastal settlement that extends along the shores of Ine Bay and is situated in Ine Town, Yoza District, Kyoto Prefecture, Japan. It is designated as a national preservation district for traditional buildings. The residential cluster that lines the coast of Ine Bay is known as "Funaya," which are famous as National Preservation District for traditional buildings.

== History ==
The exact period when people started to inhabit Ineura is uncertain. However, ancient burial mounds from the late 6th century were found on the hill overlooking Ineura, indicating the presence of human habitation in the area since ancient times. The first recorded mention of Ine can be traced back to a historical document written in 1191. Based on the inclusion of the name of a powerful individual from Ineura in a 1549 architectural record found at a Shinto shrine in the neighboring town, it is believed that a settlement was already formed in Ineura during the mid-14th century. In 1622, Takahiro Kyogoku assumed the position of the feudal lord of Miyazu Domain, and 158 villages, including the village in Ineura, became part of the domain. By 1726, three villages, namely Hide-mura, Hirata-mura, and Kameshima-mura, were present, laying the foundation for the current settlement in Ineura.

The present-day Ine-ura village is situated along the coastline. However, with the steep slopes of the mountains extending to the shores of Ine Bay, the original settlement was positioned on the mountainside behind the current Ine-ura village and houses, fields, roads, Shinto shrines, Buddhist temples, and other structures were arranged in terraces along the slope of the mountain. Consequently, whenever people go out fishing, they had to descend to the beach for their work. However, due to the immediate steep slopes of the mountains right from the coastline, the available flat land for drying fishing gear or pulling fishing boats onto land is extremely narrow, resulting in significant challenges. Therefore, they also constructed boat storages, located right at the edge of the sea, to provide convenience for storing fishing gear and boats. These boat storages facilities became the origin of the Funaya.

== Geography ==
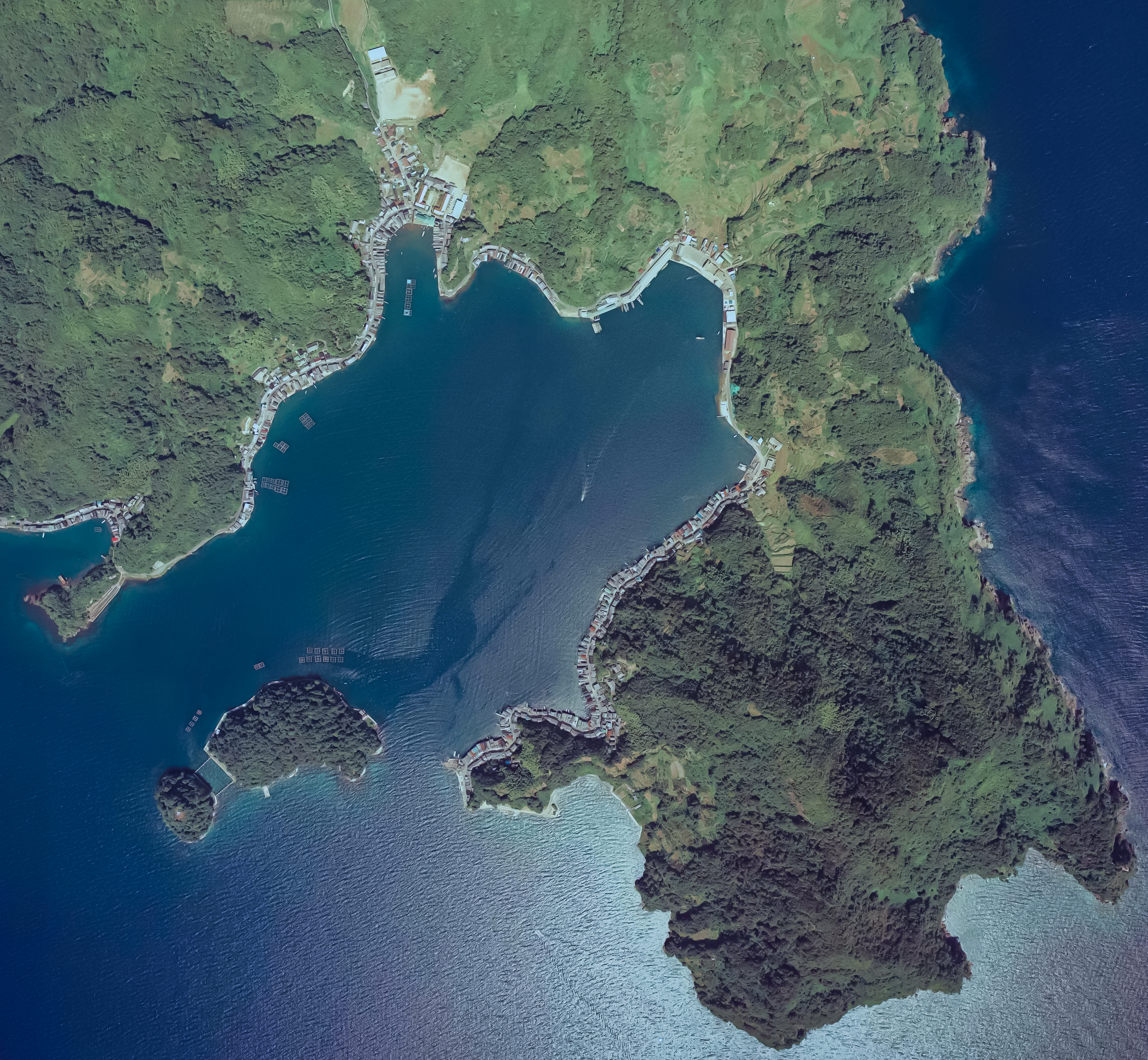
Aerial photograph of the surrounding area of Ine Bay Created based on Ministry of Land, Infrastructure, Transport and Tourism Geospatial Information Authority of Japan Map/aerial photo browsing service.

The Ine area, where Funaya are located, is surrounded by mountains on the north, west, and east, creating a terrain that blocks the seasonal winds from the Sea of Japan and Funaya form a settlement along the coastline of Ine Bay, extending in a strip for about 5 kilometers. The mountains are composed of tough rocky formations, and their steep slopes continue down to the sea, resulting in a rapid increase in water depth and forming a topography that is less prone to wave formation. As a result, the flatland of Ine-ura is very narrow, and it is on this small expanse of land that the settlement of Ine-ura has been formed. Ine Bay faces south, which makes it less susceptible to rough waves from the Sea of Japan. In the middle of the bay's entrance, there are two islands, big and small called Aoshima with a combined area of approximately 5 hectares. It divides the entrance of the bay, serving as a breakwater and providing protection for Ine Bay. Therefore, the bay has calm waters and is known for its tranquil sea. Furthermore, the tidal range in Ine Bay is small, with an average annual tidal difference of about 50 cm.

=== Funaya ===
The current Funaya is a wooden building where the first floor is used as a boat storage area, and the second floor serves as a living space. Originally, Funaya were single-story warehouse structures designed as storage spaces for fishing boats and equipment, not intended for human habitation. The original Funaya had thatched roofs, either with straw or reed, and the construction materials were sourced from the nearby mountains using timber. The beams of the Funaya were made from logs of pine or chestnut, while the foundation and pillars were constructed using water-resistant Japanese chinquapin wood. The surroundings of the Funaya were often simple enclosures made with old shipboards or hanging straw ropes. Inside theFunaya, small fishing boats were stored and the width of the Funaya entrance was referred to as "two-boat-width" or "three-boat-width" depending on whether it could accommodate two or three boats. In the late Edo period, semi-two-story Funaya started to appear, and during the Taisho period, tiled roofs and two-story Funaya began to appear.

The roads passing through the Funaya settlements were originally very narrow alleyways that were only wide enough for people to pass through, as they served as the central courtyard-like space between the main house and the Funaya. Because the primary means of transportation between settlements was mainly by boat, and the central courtyard-like space naturally formed a pathway (alleyway) for moving between neighboring areas. The road that currently passes through the settlement is the Kyoto Prefectural Ine Port Line, which underwent expansion works between 1931 and 1940. It was widened from the original narrow alleyways and transformed into a road spanning approximately 5 kilometers in length with a width of about 4 meters. Due to the lack of land for road expansion, the sea was reclaimed and the Funaya was moved to that area and during this process, many Funaya transformed into two-story structures. Another factor contributing to the transition from thatched roofs to tiled roofs and the reconstruction into two-story buildings was the prosperous yellowtail fishing industry from around 1880 to 1950, which brought economic growth to the area.

The two-story Funaya have been used as storage for boats on the first floor and as warehouses or drying areas for fishing gear such as nets and ropes on the second floor. Initially, many of the Funaya had no walls for ventilation. However, as time went by and fishing equipment, techniques, and lifestyles changed, the usage of the Funaya and their structures also underwent transformation. For example, traditional hemp fishing nets were replaced by synthetic fiber fishing nets, which eliminated the need for rooms to dry the nets, as synthetic nets do not require drying like hemp nets. Consequently, the usage of the second floor of the Funaya as storage warehouses decreased, and there was a growing number of individuals who converted the Funaya for residential use.

The current Funaya are roofed with tiles, and many of them are two-story structures with a width of around 4 meters and a depth of approximately 10 meters. The entire front entrance on the side facing the sea is open on the first floor of the Funaya, allowing for the pulling in of boats. The interior floor is paved with stones and slopes towards the sea, facilitating the process of hauling the boats. During high tide, the water level rises up to about half of the first-floor surface, creating a spectacle where the Funaya appear as if they are floating on the sea. The foundations of old Funaya were traditionally built with two or three tiers of granite stones, while the foundations of current Funaya are made of concrete. Some Funaya have been modified with stone walls to seal the openings on the seaside, preventing the intrusion of seawater. The reason for this is that boats have become larger, and it is no longer possible to fit them on the first floor of the Funaya. Consequently, the first floor is no longer used as a storage warehouse for boats. Additionally, there has been an increase in the installation of windows and other openings on the second floor as they are utilized for residential purposes. Furthermore, there is a growing number of Funaya that, while retaining their exterior as Funaya, are being converted into accommodations or restaurants, serving purposes other than their original use.

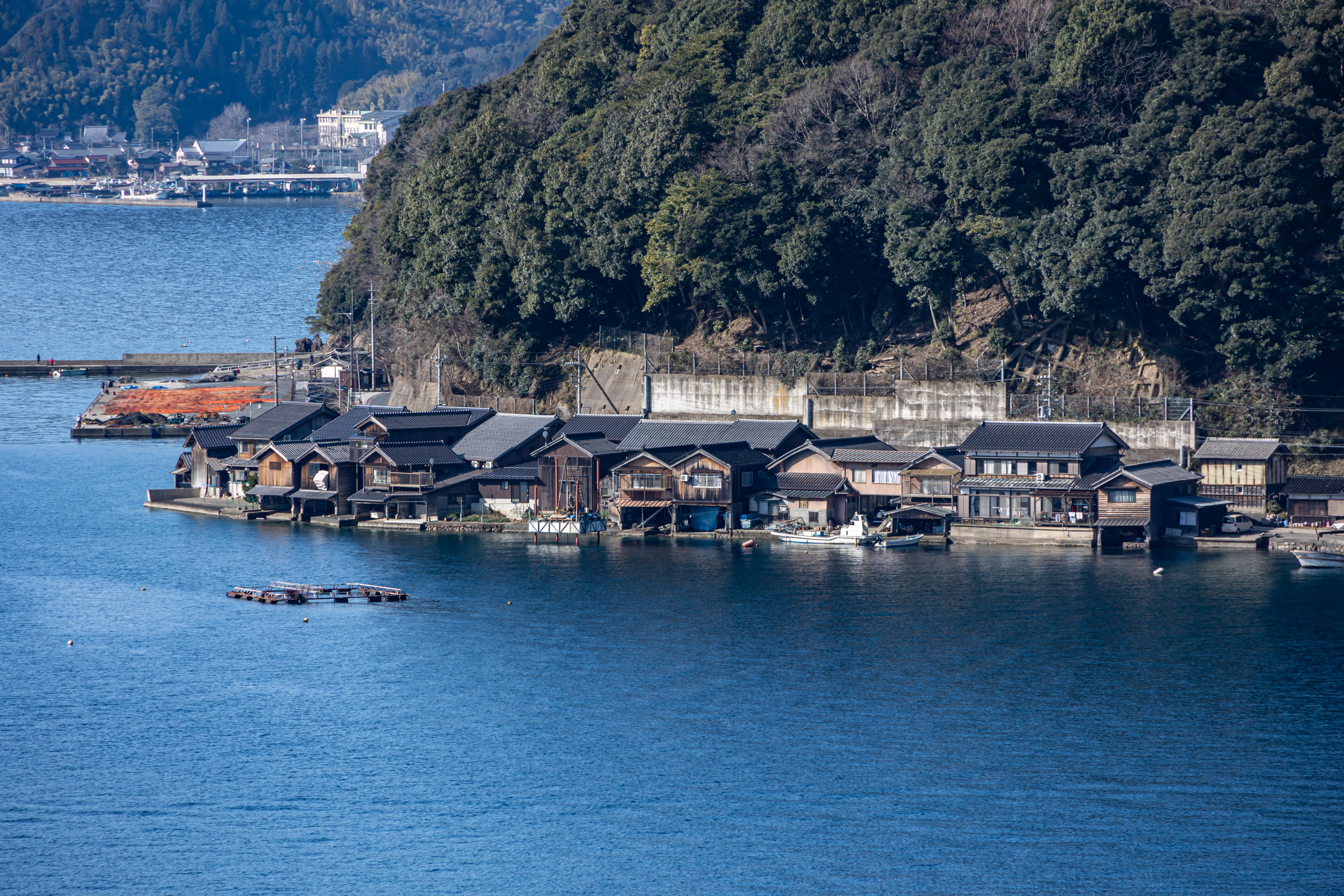
The Funaya built on the small stretch of flat land between the steep mountains and the sea.

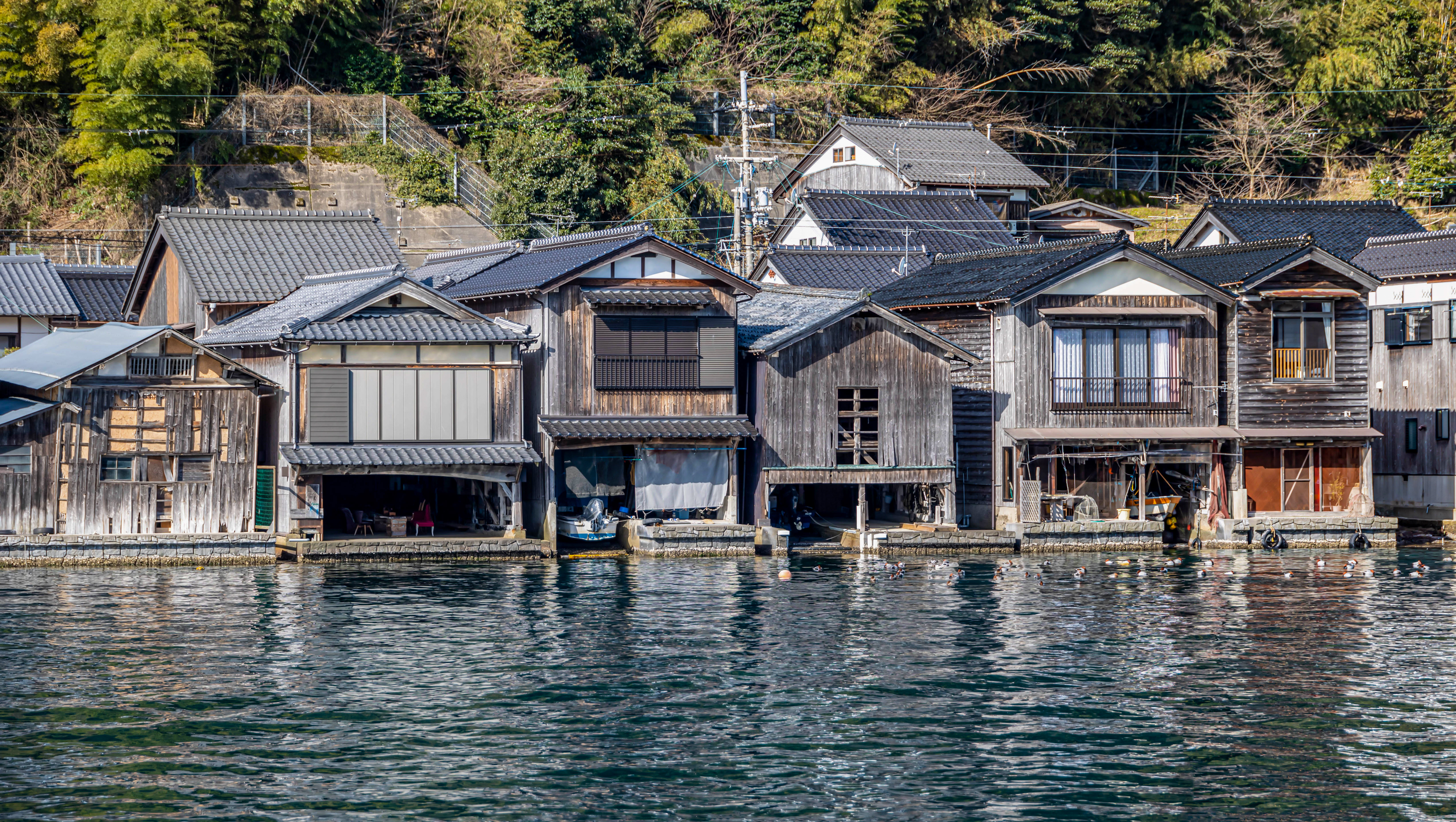
The Funaya that seem to float on the sea.

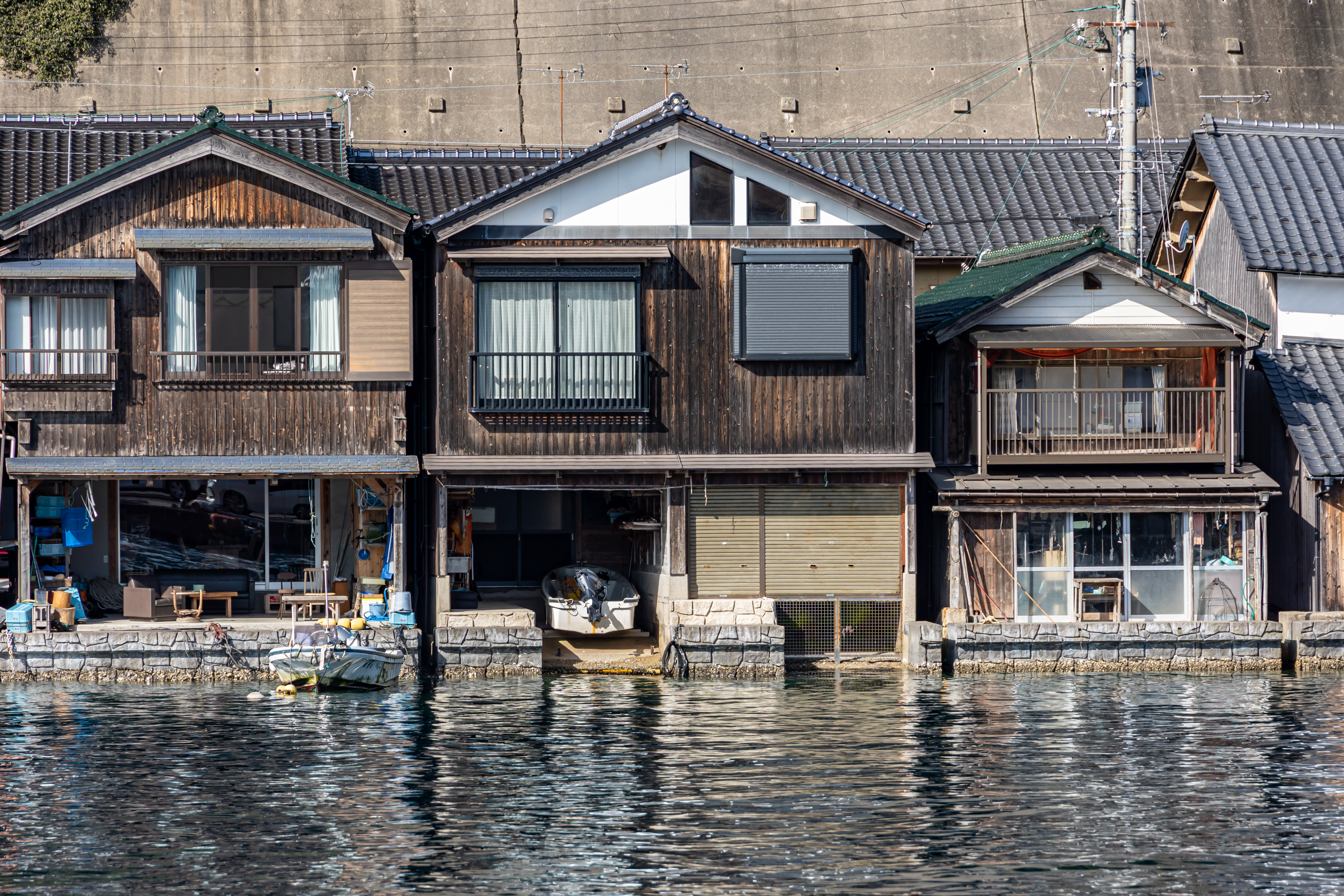
Boats stored in the Funaya.

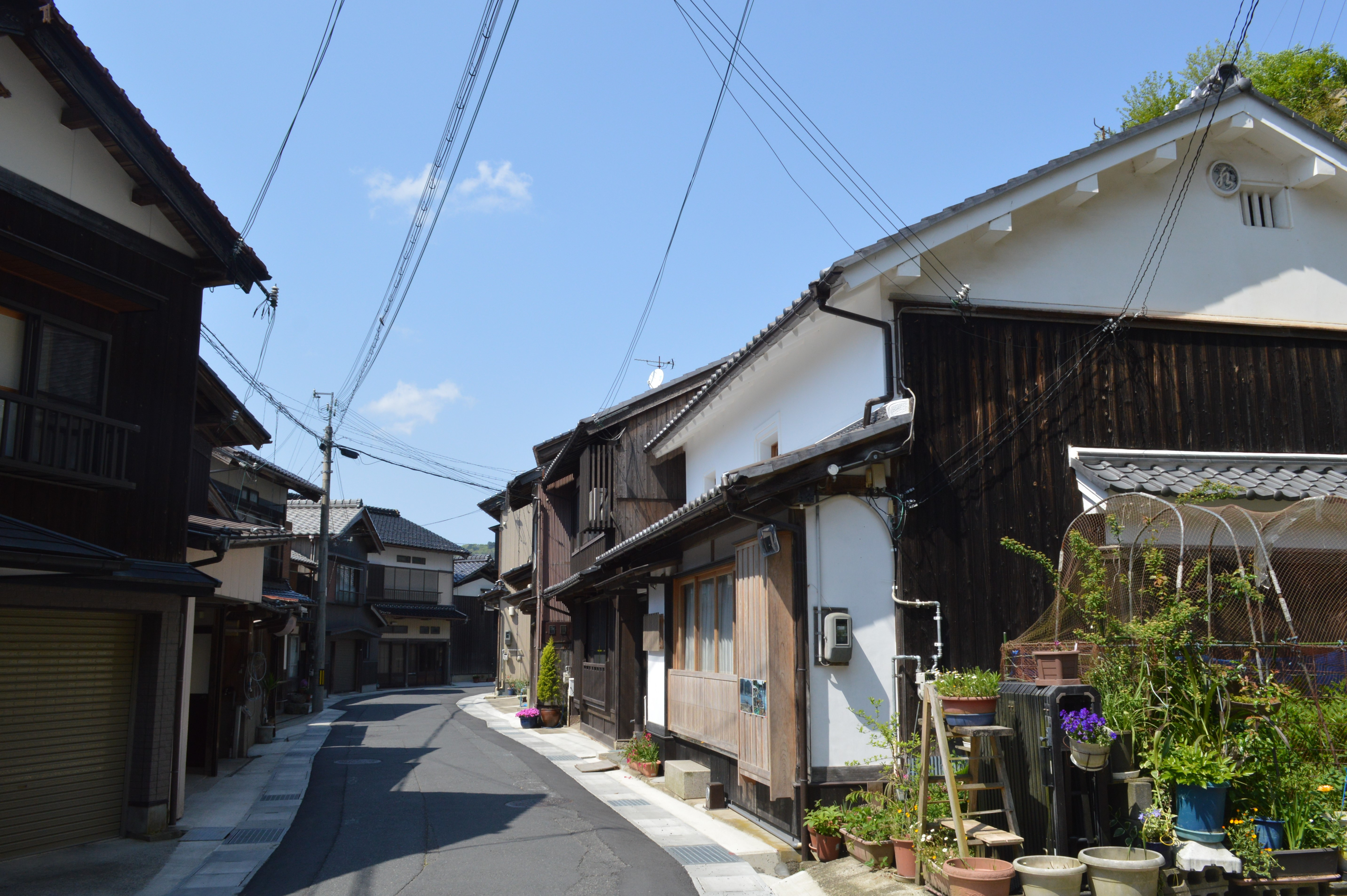
The roads and town layout of the present-day Ine-ura settlement

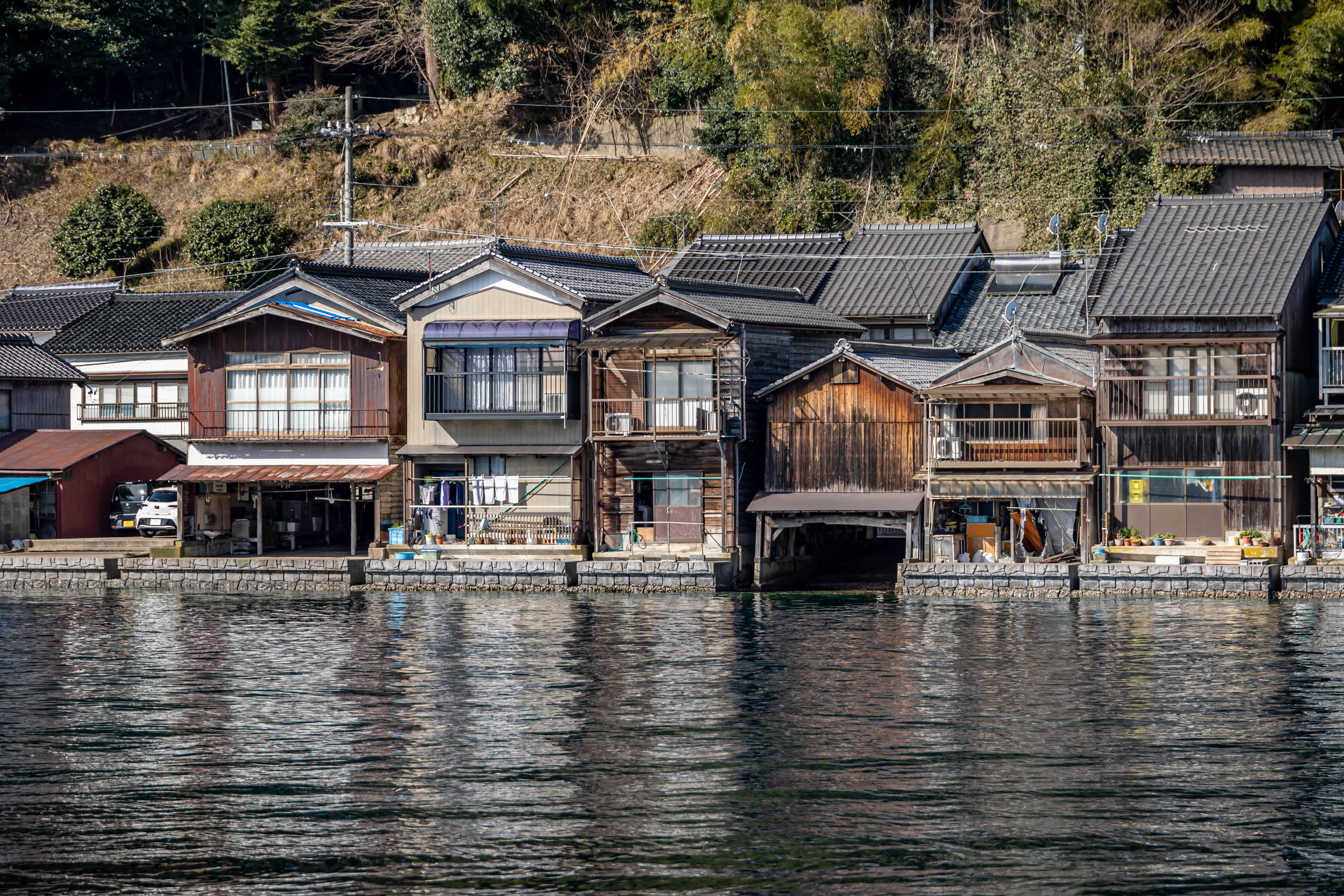
The third Funaya from the right is an old type Funaya. The other Funaya have been converted into residential dwellings.
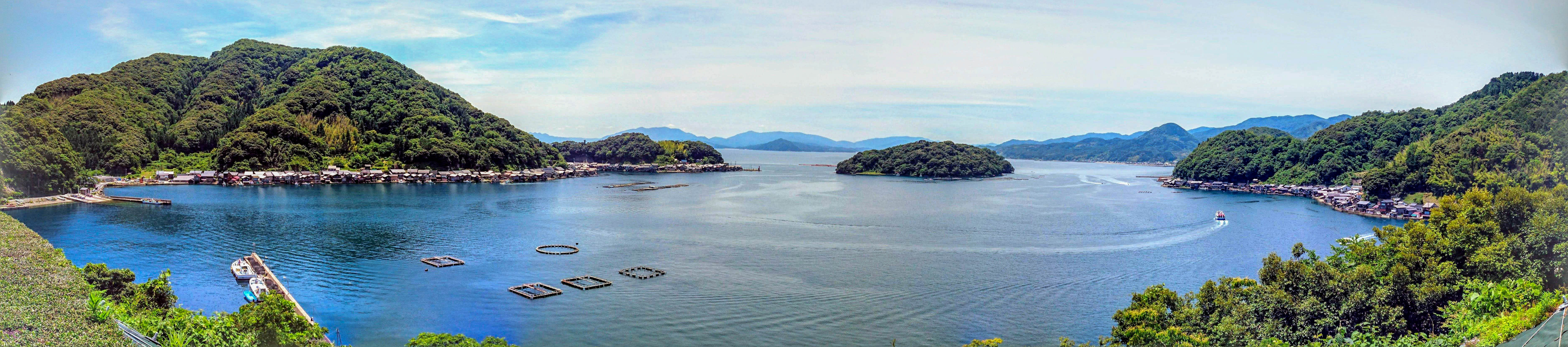
Panoramic view of Ine Bay. There is Aoshima Island at the entrance of the bay, and Funaya are lined up in a belt along the coastline.

== General and cited references ==
- Ine Town Board of Education, ed. (2011). 伊根町伊根浦伝統的建造物群保存地区関係例規集 (PDF) (in Japanese). Ine Town Board of Education.
- Kinki Architects Association Council, ed. (1973). ひろば (110) (in Japanese). Kinki Architects Association Council.
- Koji Nishikawa (1979). 歴史の町なみ 京都篇 (NHKブックス カラー版; C1) (in Japanese). Japan Broadcasting Publishing Association.
- Kyoto Prefectural Tango Folk Museum, ed. (1987). 伊根浦の歴史と民俗 (特別陳列図録; 21) (in Japanese). Kyoto Prefectural Tango Folk Museum.
- Momoyama Gakuin University, ed. (1974). 伊根町のすがた : 地域調査をもとにして (in Japanese). Sugimoto Seminar of Momoyama Gakuin University.
