= Yosano =

Yosano 与謝野町
- Town
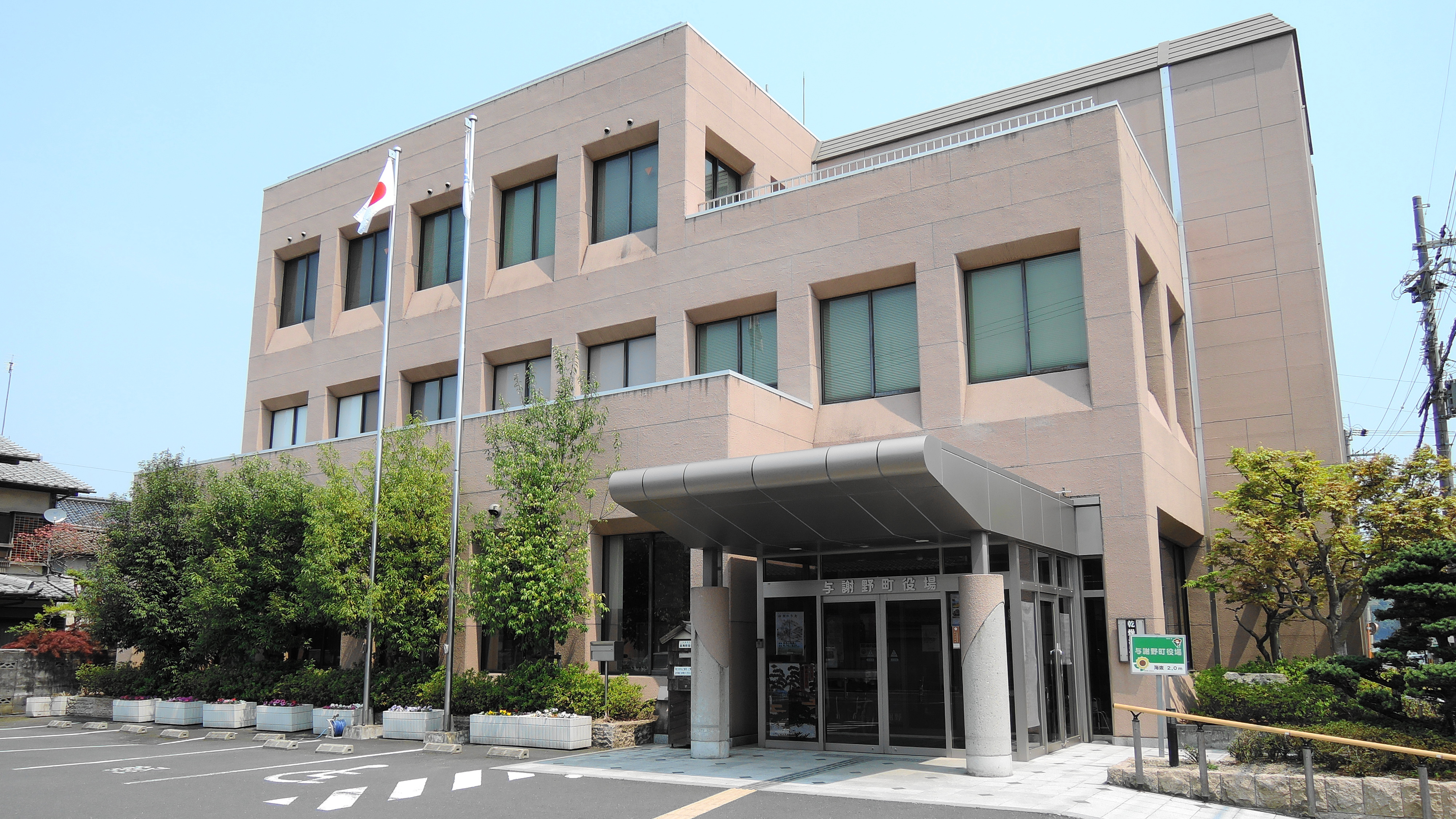
- Yosano town hall

- Flag Seal

- Location of Yosano in Kyoto Prefecture

- Location in Japan
- Coordinates: 35°34′N 135°9′E
- Country: Japan
- Region: Kansai
- Prefecture: Kyoto
- District: Yosa

Area
  - Total: 108.38 km^{2} (41.85 sq mi)

Population (February 28, 2022)
  - Total: 20,575
  - Density: 189.84/km^{2} (491.69/sq mi)
- Time zone: UTC+09:00 (JST)
- City hall address: 1798 Iwataki, Yosano-cho, Yosano-gun, Kyoto-fu 629-2262
- Symbols
- Flower: Sunflower
- Tree: Camellia

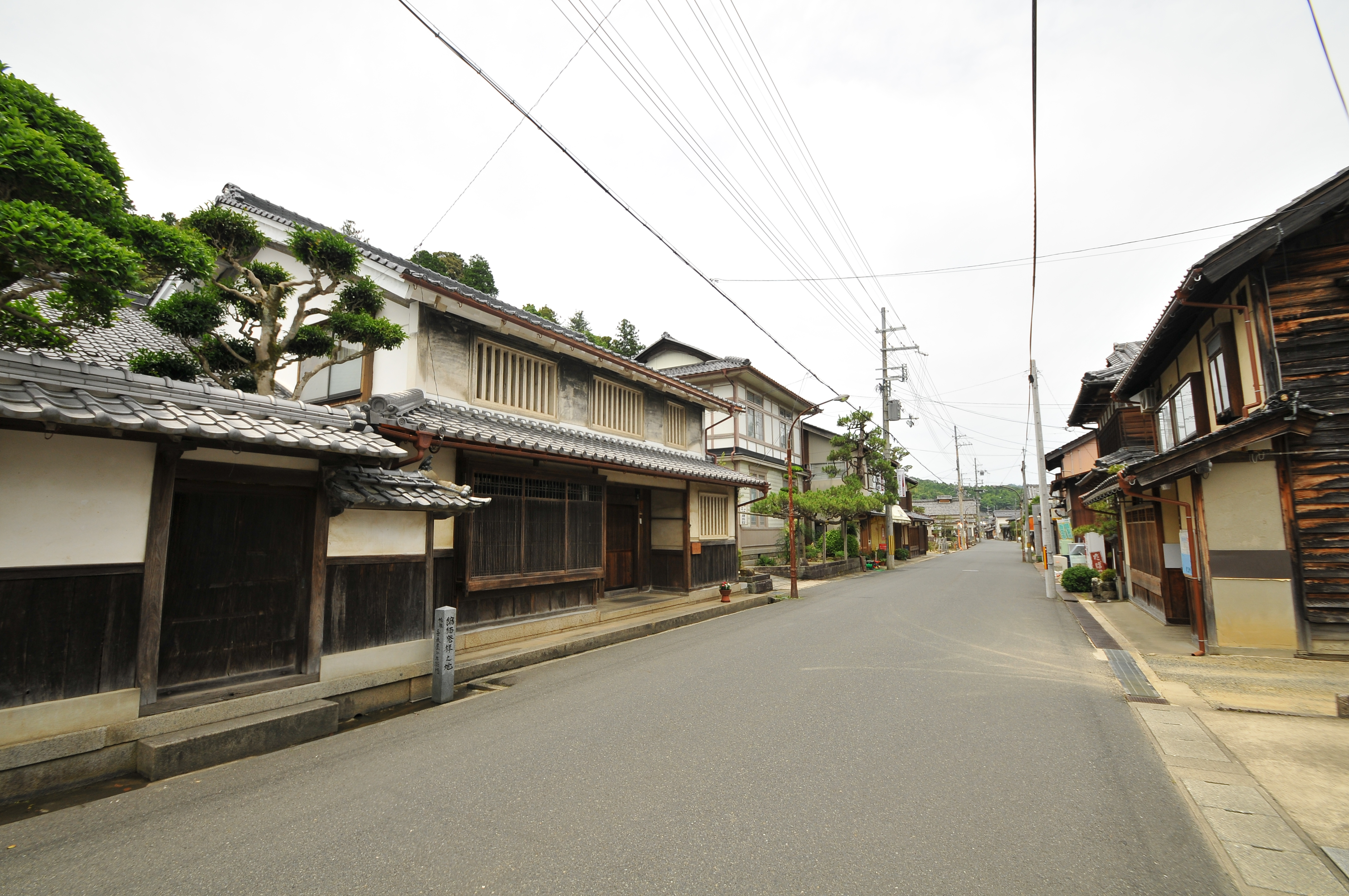
Chirimen Kaido in Yosano

Yosano (与謝野町, Yosano-chō) is a town located in Yosa District, Kyoto, Japan. As of 28 February 2022, the town had an estimated population of 20,575 in 8978 households and a population density of 190 persons per km^{2}. The total area of the town is 108.38 square kilometres (41.85 sq mi).

== Geography ==
Yosano is located in the northern part of Kyoto Prefecture at the base of the Tango Peninsula. The Nodagawa River runs through most of the town south to north leading to the Miyazu Bay, and the Ama-no-Hashidate. The closest cities are Fukuchiyama to the south and Toyooka to the west, both about 45 minutes by car. The town is around 2 1/2 hours north of Kyoto, Osaka, Himeji and Kobe.

=== Neighboring municipalities ===
Hyōgo Prefecture

- Toyooka

Kyoto Prefecture

- Fukuchiyama
- Kyōtango
- Miyazu

=== Climate ===
Yosano has a humid subtropical climate (Köppen Cfa) characterized by warm summers and cool winters with light to no snowfall. The average annual temperature in Yosano is 13.4 °C. The average annual rainfall is 1807 mm with September as the wettest month. The temperatures are highest on average in August, at around 25.4 °C, and lowest in January, at around 2.1 °C.

== Demographics ==
Per Japanese census data, the population of Yosano peaked around 1970 and has declined since.

Historical population
Year	Pop.	±%
1920	22,198	—
1930	23,668	+6.6%
1940	25,822	+9.1%
1950	27,507	+6.5%
1960	28,008	+1.8%
1970	28,617	+2.2%
1980	28,061	−1.9%
1990	26,371	−6.0%
2000	25,593	−3.0%
2010	23,454	−8.4%
2020	20,092	−14.3%

== History ==
The area of the modern town of Yosano was within ancient Tango Province, and the place name of "Yosa" dates from records of the early 8th century. In the Edo Period, it was part of the area was controlled by Miyazu Domain. The town of Kaya and villages of Yosano and Iwataki were established within Yosa District with the creation of the modern municipalities system on April 1, 1889. On April 1, 1921, Iwataki was raised to town status. On December 1, 1954, Yosano merged with Kaya. On March 1, 1955, five villages merged to form the town of Nodagawa. Kaya, Iwataki and Nodagawa merged to form the town of Yosano on March 1, 2006.

== Government ==
Yosano has a mayor-council form of government with a directly elected mayor and a unicameral town council of 16 members. Yosano, together with the city of Miyazu contributes one member to the Kyoto Prefectural Assembly. In terms of national politics, the town is part of Kyoto 5th district of the lower house of the Diet of Japan.

== Economy ==
Yosano has a mixed economy of agriculture and textiles. A type of crêpe fabric called Tango chirimen has bene a famous local product since the Edo period.

== Education ==
Yosano has six public elementary schools and three public middle schools operated by the town government and one public high school operated by the Kyoto Prefectural Department of Education. The prefecture also operates one vocational training school, the Kyoto Prefectural Nursing School.

== Transportation ==
=== Railway ===
Kyoto Tango Railway – Miyazu Line

- Yosano

=== Highway ===
- National Route 176
- National Route 178
- National Route 312

== Local attractions ==
- Chirimen Kaido (designated National Preservation District for traditional buildings)

=== National Historic Sites ===
- Ebisuyama Kofun
- Hiyoshigaoka - Akashi Tumuli
- Shirageyama Kofun
- Tsukuriyama Kofun
