= Iwataki, Kyoto =

Dissolved municipality in Kyoto prefecture, Japan

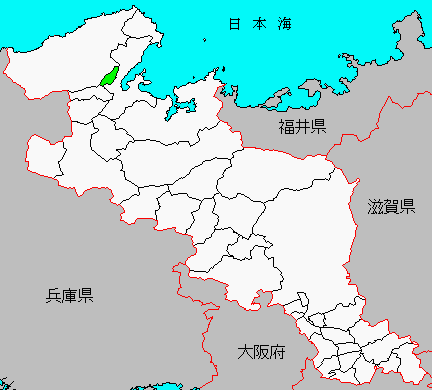

Iwataki (岩滝町, Iwataki-chō) was a town located in Yosa District, Kyoto Prefecture, Japan.

In 2005, the town had an estimated population of 6,692 and a population density of 554 per km^{2}. The total area was 12.09 km^{2}.

On March 1, 2006, (after years of debate), Iwataki, along with the towns of Kaya and Nodagawa (all from Yosa District), was merged to create the town of Yosano.

== Economy ==
Tango-chirimen, a special silk fabric with a unique texture known as crêpe is a major business for the region. A nickel processing plant located along the Nodagawa River provides employment for some of the local population. Tourism is also an important industry as many tourists come to visit the world-famous Amanohashidate, a natural land bridge that crosses the bay.

== Education ==
Iwataki has one elementary school (K-6) and one junior high school (7–9). A free public library is also open to the community.

The elementary school has science rooms, computer laboratories, a library, a kitchen for student cooking and a hot lunch program for students. The school has a good view of the town and the Amanohashidate.
