= Nodagawa, Kyoto =

Dissolved municipality in Kyoto prefecture, Japan

Nodagawa (野田川町, Nodagawa-chō) was a town located in Yosa District, Kyoto Prefecture, Japan.

As of 2006, the town had an estimated population of 11,281 and a density of 314 persons per km^{2}. The total area was 35.90 km^{2}.

On March 1, 2006, Nodagawa, along with the towns of Iwataki and Kaya (all from Yosa District), was merged to create the town of Yosano.
