= Kaya, Kyoto =

Dissolved municipality in Kyoto prefecture, Japan

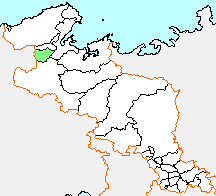

Kaya (加悦町, Kaya-chō) was a town located in Yosa District, Kyoto Prefecture, Japan.

As of 2006, the town had an estimated population of 7,913 and a density of 134 persons per km^{2}. The total area was 59.05 km^{2}.

On March 1, 2006, Kaya, along with the towns of Iwataki and Nodagawa (all from Yosa District), was merged to create the town of Yosano.

== Sister cities ==
Kaya's sister-town was Aberystwyth in Wales.

== See also ==
- Groups of Traditional Buildings
