= Ine, Kyoto =

Ine 伊根町
- Town
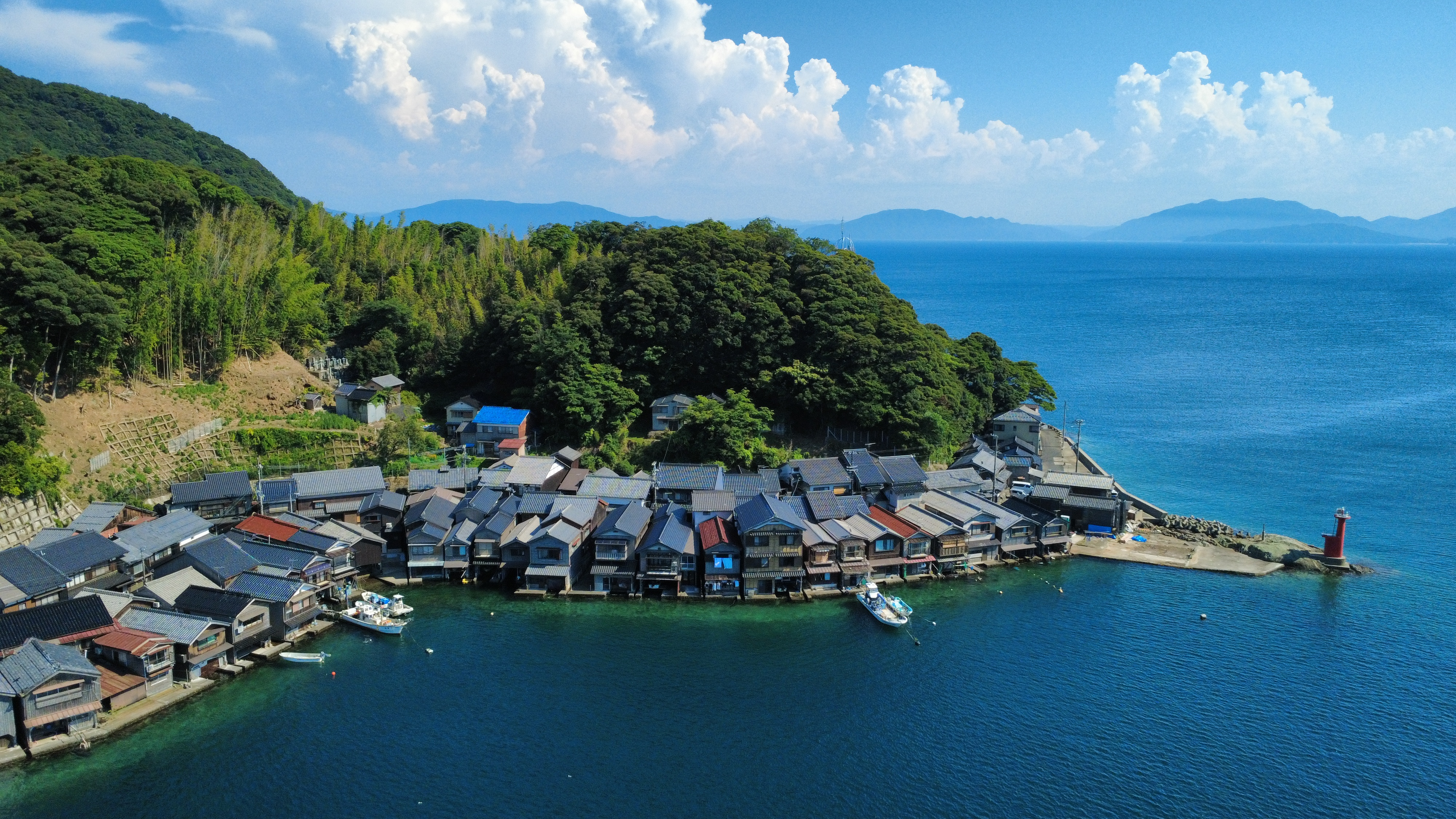
- View of Ine

- Flag Emblem

- Location of Ine in Kyoto Prefecture

- Location in Japan
- Coordinates: 35°41′N 135°17′E
- Country: Japan
- Region: Kansai
- Prefecture: Kyoto
- District: Yosa

Government
  - Mayor: Yoshimoto Hideki

Area
  - Total: 61.95 km^{2} (23.92 sq mi)

Population (February 28, 2022)
  - Total: 1,984
  - Density: 32.03/km^{2} (82.95/sq mi)
- Time zone: UTC+09:00 (JST)
- City hall address: 651 Hide, Ine-cho, Yoza-gun, Kyoto-fu 626-0493
- Website: Official website
- Symbols
- Flower: Chrysanthemum
- Tree: Japanese Black Pine

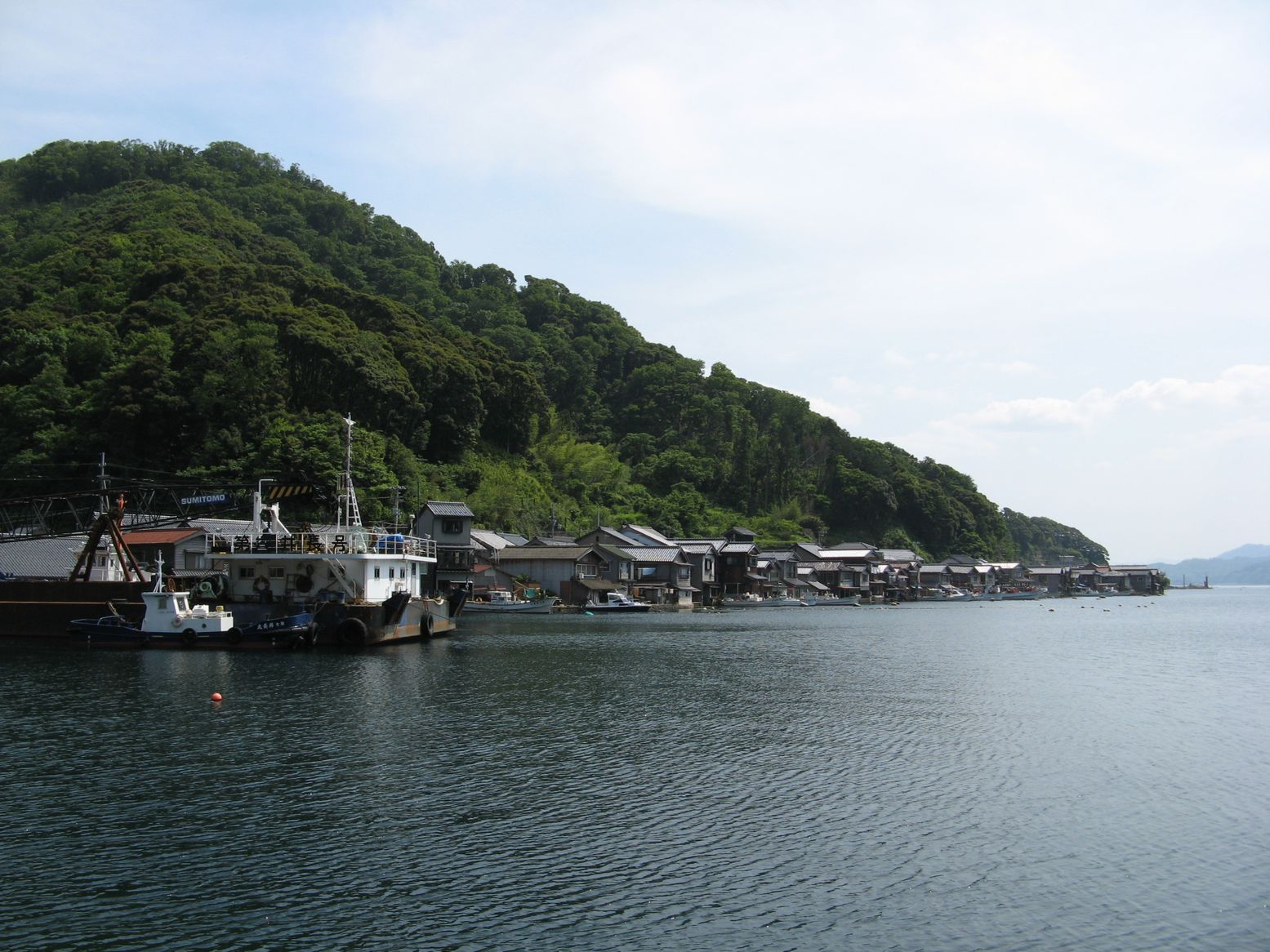
The harbour of Ine

Ine (伊根町, Ine-chō) is a town located in Yosa District, Kyoto Prefecture, Japan. As of 28 February 2022, the town had an estimated population of 1,984 in 899 households and a population density of 32 persons per km^{2}. The total area of the town is 61.95 square kilometres (23.92 sq mi).

== Geography ==
Ine is located in the northern part of Kyoto Prefecture at the northeastern end of the Tango Peninsula. Located on the coast of the Sea of Japan, the town faces Wakasa Bay from the northeast to the southeast.

=== Neighboring municipalities ===
Kyoto Prefecture

- Kyōtango
- Miyazu

== Climate ==
Ine has a humid subtropical climate (Köppen Cfa) characterized by warm summers and cold winters with heavy snowfall. The average annual temperature in Ine is 14.4 °C. The average annual rainfall is 1912 mm with September as the wettest month. The temperatures are highest on average in August, at around 25.7 °C, and lowest in January, at around 4.1 °C.

== Demographics ==
Per Japanese census data, Ine has suffered greatly from rural depopulation over the past 70 years.

Historical population
Year	Pop.	±%
1920	7,579	—
1930	7,523	−0.7%
1940	7,151	−4.9%
1950	7,786	+8.9%
1960	6,958	−10.6%
1970	4,779	−31.3%
1980	4,021	−15.9%
1990	3,586	−10.8%
2000	3,112	−13.2%
2010	2,412	−22.5%
2020	1,928	−20.1%

== History ==
The area of the modern town of Ine was within ancient Tango Province, and ports along this coast had trade connections with mainland Asia in ancient times. The town has connections with the Urashima Tarō legend (Tsutsukawa district and Honjo-Hama district ) and with the Xu Fu legend (Nii district) . In the Edo Period, it was part of the area was controlled by Miyazu Domain. The town of Ine was established within Yosa District with the creation of the modern municipalities system on April 1, 1889. The village was bombed by the United States Navy in World War II. On November 3, 1954, Ine merged with the neighboring villages of Tsutsukawa, Asadsuma, and Honjo and was raised to town status. In October 2008, Ine was designated one of The Most Beautiful Villages in Japan.

== Government ==
Ine has a mayor-council form of government with a directly elected mayor and a unicameral town council of 9 members. Ine, together with the city of Miyazu and town of Yosano, contributes one member to the Kyoto Prefectural Assembly. In terms of national politics, the town is part of Kyoto 5th district of the lower house of the Diet of Japan.

== Economy ==
Ine has a mixed economy of commercial and tourism. The town is famous for wooden fishing houses called "Funaya", selected as a National Preservation District for traditional buildings.

== Education ==
Ine has two public elementary schools and one public middle school operated by the town government. The town's one public high school closed in 2020.

== Transportation ==
=== Railway ===
Ine has no railway service. The nearest passenger train stations are Miyazu Station or Amanohashidate Station on the Kyoto Tango Railway in neighboring Miyazu.

=== Highway ===
- National Route 178

== Local attractions ==
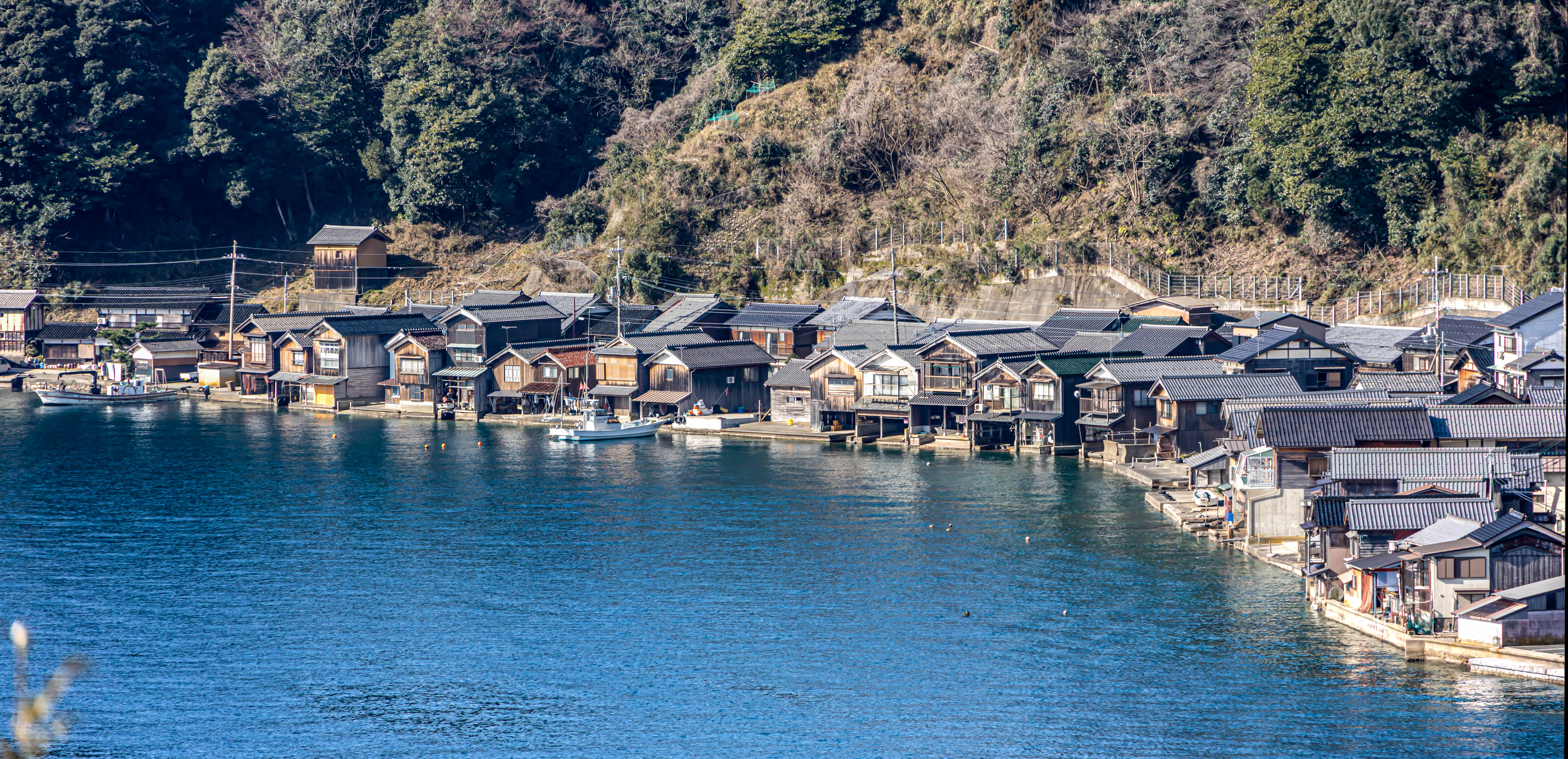
Funaya

- Ine Funaya (designated National Preservation District for traditional buildings)
- Ura Shrine
- Urashima Park

== In popular culture ==
- 1982; Hearts and Flowers for Tora-san
- 1993; Eenyobo (ええにょぼ) (Asadora) TV drama was set in a Funaya in Ine.
