= Yosa District =

District in Kyōto prefecture, Japan

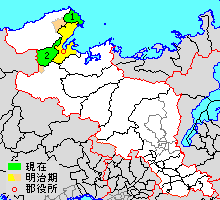
Location of Yosa in Kyoto prefecture

Yosa (与謝郡, Yosa-gun) is a district located in Kyoto Prefecture, Japan.

As of 2003, the district has an estimated population of 27,829 and a population density of 165 persons per square kilometer. The total area is 169.02 km^{2}.

== Towns and villages ==
- Ine
- Yosano

== Mergers ==
- On March 1, 2006, the towns of Kaya, Iwataki and Nodagawa merged to form the new town of Yosano.
