= Ebisuyama Kofun =

Kofun period burial mound in Yosano, Japan

- 蛭子山古墳 (Japanese)
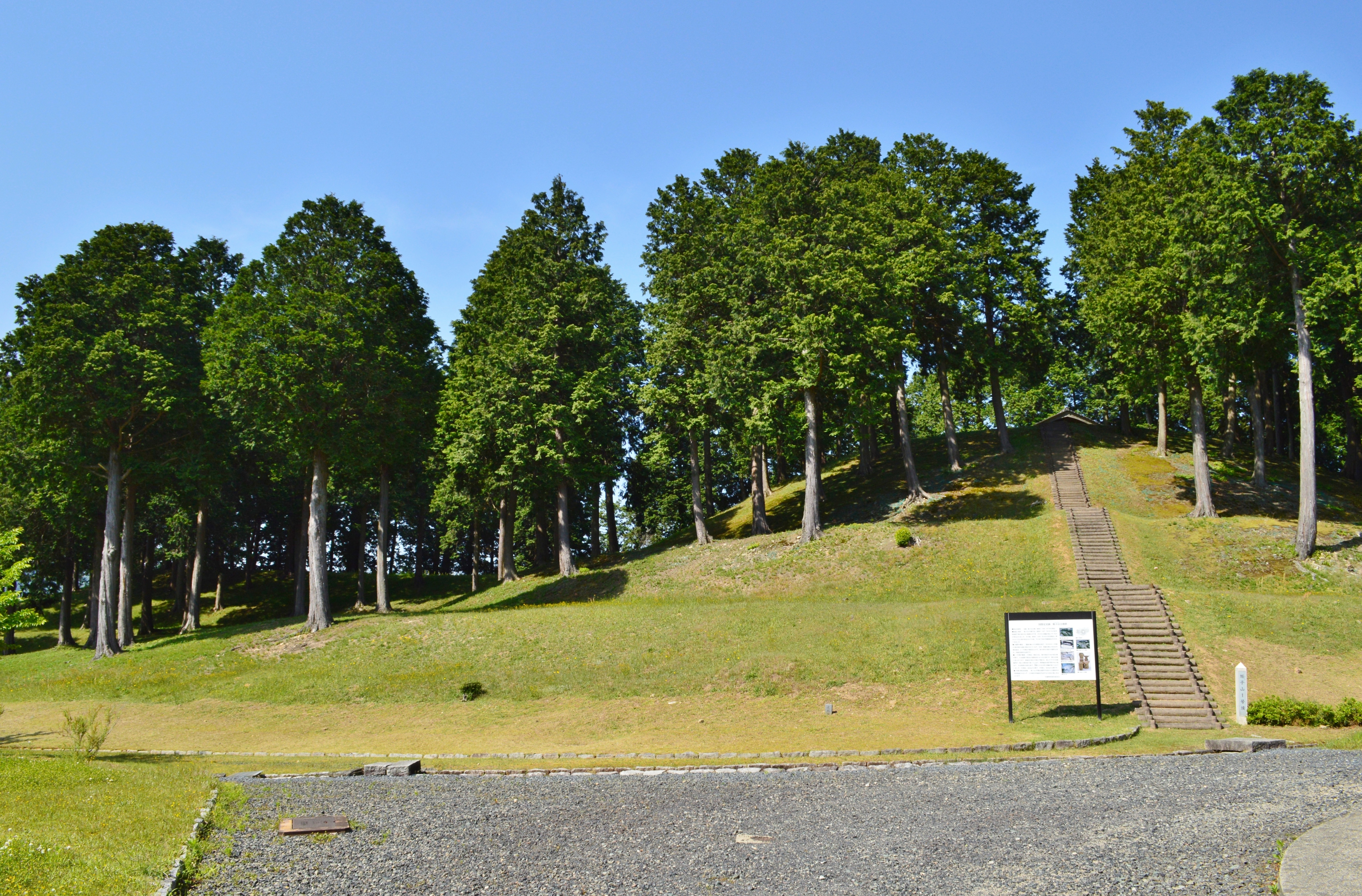
- Ebisuyama Kofun

- Ebisuyama Kofun Ebisuyama Kofun (Japan)
- 35°30′25.76″N 135°6′16.25″E
- Type: Kofun
- Periods: Kofun period
- Location: Yosano, Kyoto, Japan
- Region: Kansai region

History
- Built: c.4th century

Site notes
- Public access: Yes (No facilities)
- National Historic Site of Japan

The Ebisuyama Kofun (蛭子山古墳) is a Kofun period burial mound, located in the Yosano neighborhood of the town of Yosano, Kyoto in the Kansai region of Japan. The tumulus was designated a National Historic Site of Japan in 1930.

== Overview ==
The Ebisuyama Kofun is a zenpō-kōen-fun (前方後円墳), which is shaped like a keyhole, having one square end and one circular end, when viewed from above. It is located in the Noda River basin in the Tango Peninsula, and is orientated to the northwest. The tumulus has an overall length of 170 meters, and is the largest of a group of eight tumuli in this vicinity. It is estimated to have been constructed in the middle of the Kofun period, or the early 4th century. The tumulus was constructed in three tiers, and had both fukiishi, and cylindrical and figurative haniwa. After damage due to the 1927 North Tango earthquake, the tumulus was excavated and three burial facilities have been found in the center of the posterior circular portion, of which one contained a boat-shaped sarcophagus with elaborate carvings. Grave goods included bronze mirrors and iron swords and spearheads. The sarcophagus was designated a Kyoto Prefecture Tangible Cultural Property in 2019. Currently, the site, together with the Tsukuriyama Kofun, is open to the public as the Yosano Municipal Kofun Park.

The tumulus is about 15 minutes by car from Nodagawa Station on the Miyazu Line of the Kyoto Tango Railway.

Total length
170 meters:
Anterior rectangular portion
62 meters wide x 11 meters high, 3-tier
Posterior circular portion
100 meter diameter x 16 meters high, 3-tiers

== Gallery ==
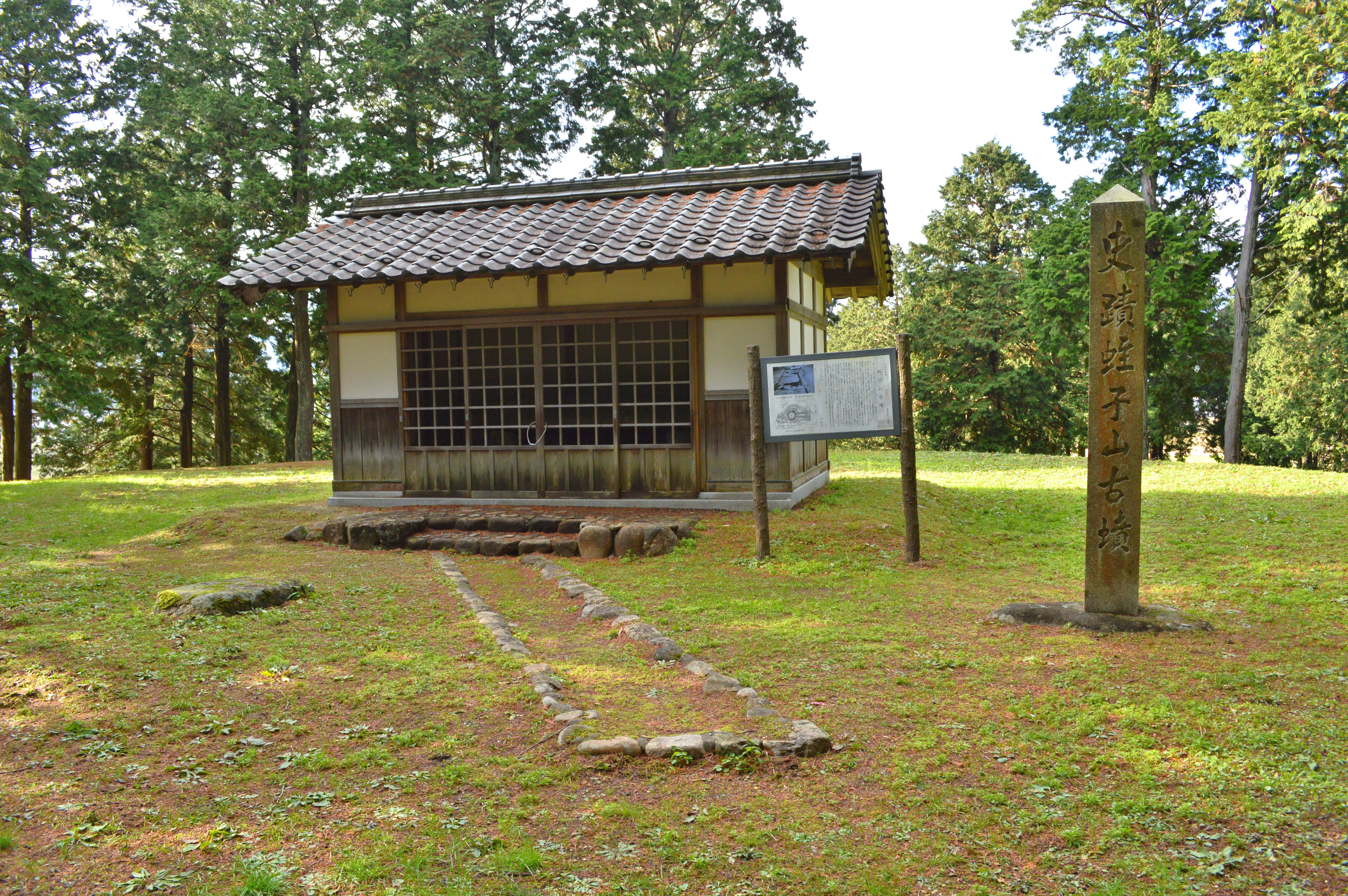
Summit of posterior circular portion

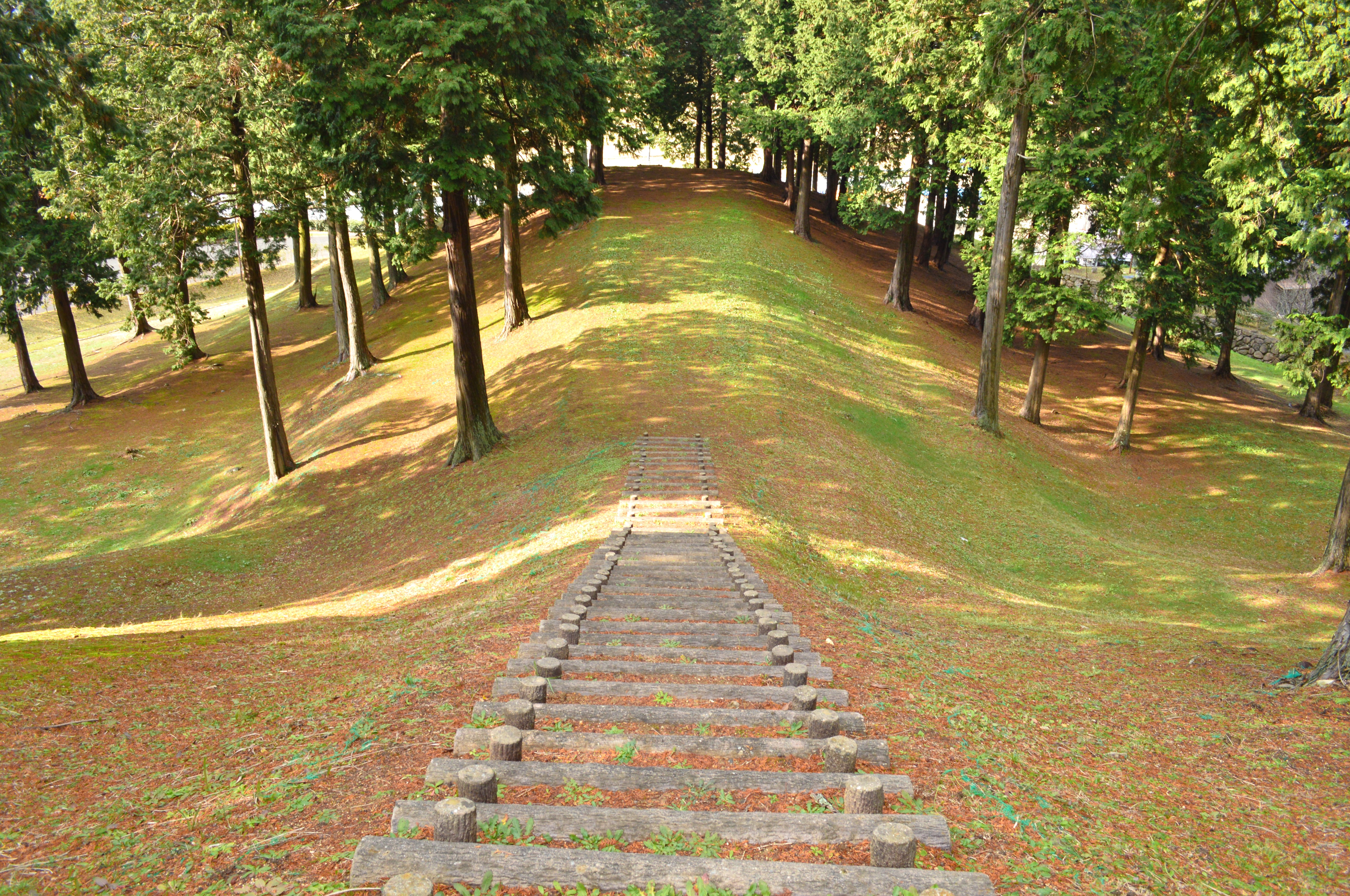
Posterior looking towards anterior

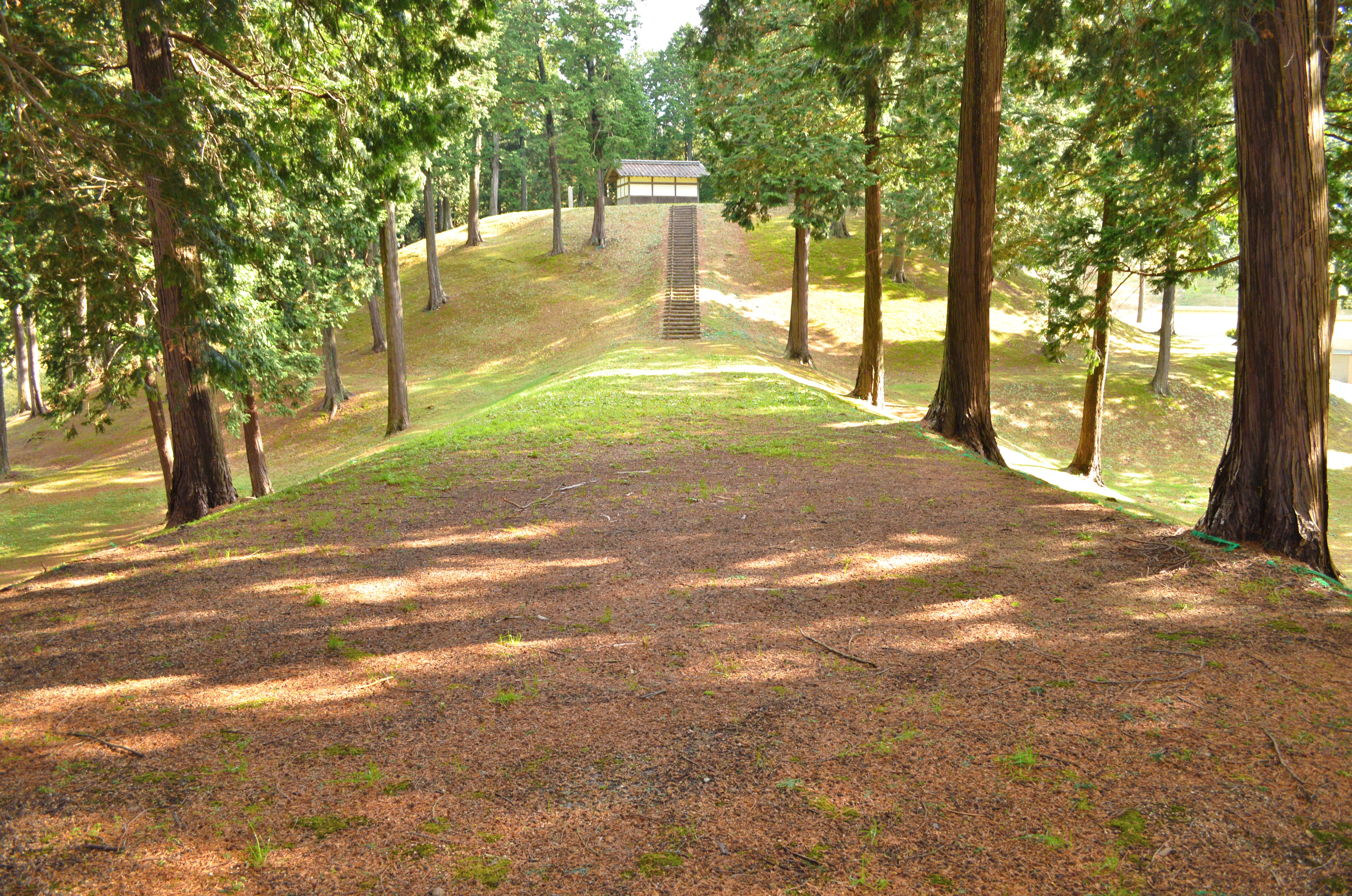
Anterior looking towards posterior

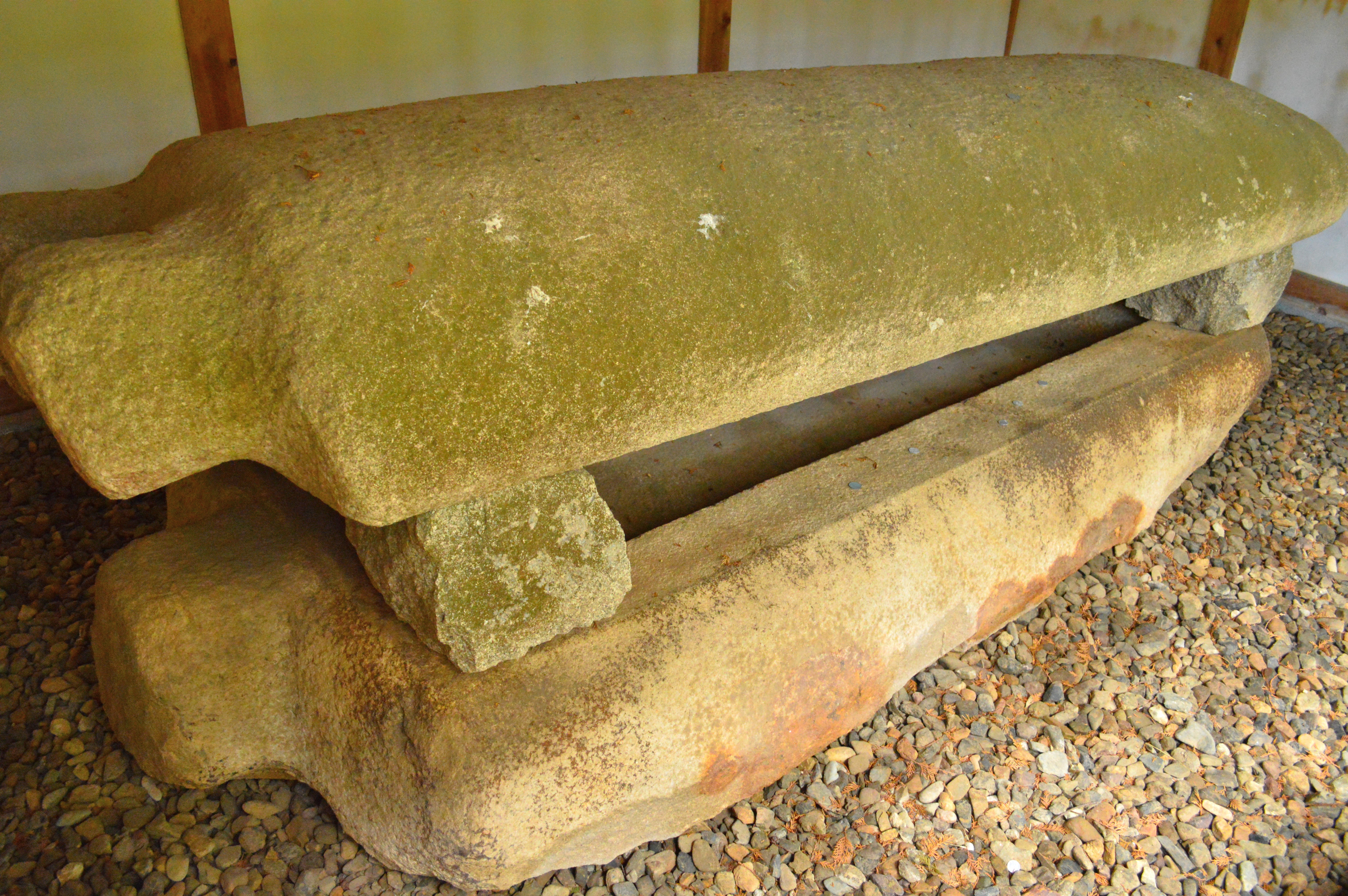
Sarcophagus

iron spearhead

Cylindrical haniwa

Cylindrical haniwa

== See also ==
- List of Historic Sites of Japan (Kyoto)
