= Tsukuriyama Kofun (Yosano) =

Tsukuriyama Kofun cluster
- 作山古墳群 (Japanese)
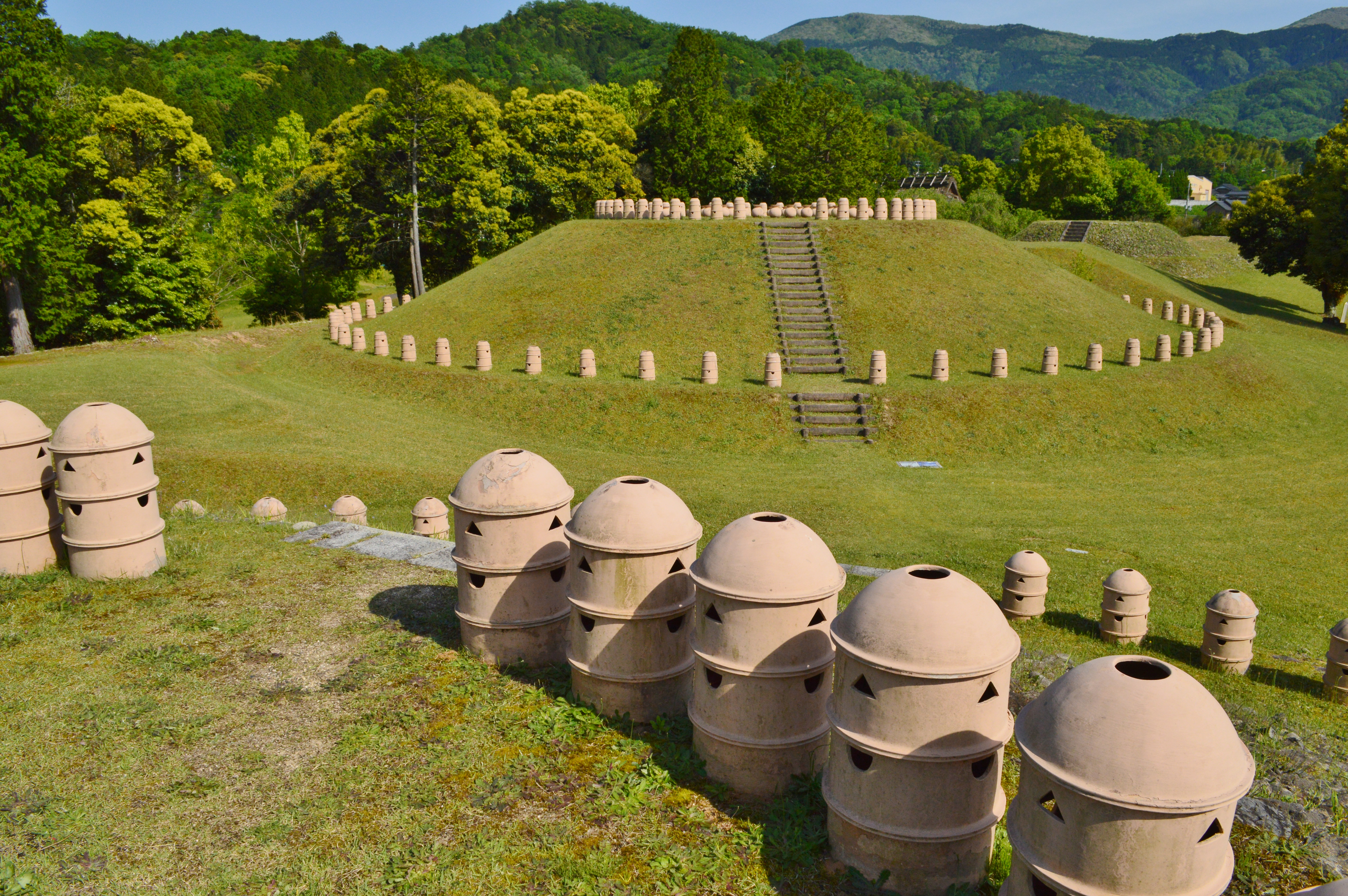
- Tsukuriyama Kofun-gun

- Tsukuriyama Kofun-gun Tsukuriyama Kofun (Yosano) (Japan)
- Interactive map of Tsukuriyama Kofun cluster
- 35°30′21.82″N 135°06′16.96″E
- Type: Kofun cluster
- Periods: Kofun period
- Location: Yosano, Kyoto, Japan
- Region: Kansai region

History
- Built: c.5th century

Site notes
- Public access: Yes (No facilities)

The Tsukuriyama Kofun cluster (作山古墳群) is a group of Kofun period burial mounds, located in the Yosano neighborhood of the town of Yosano, Kyoto in the Kansai region of Japan. The group consists of five tumuli which were collectively designated a National Historic Site of Japan in 1930.

== Overview ==
The Tsukuriyama Kofun cluster is located at the base of the Tango Peninsula in northern Kyoto Prefecture. It consists of a total of five tumuli: one zenpō-kōen-fun (前方後円墳), which is shaped like a keyhole, having one square end and one circular end, when viewed from above, two enpun (円墳)-style circular burial mounds and two hofun (方墳)-style square burial mounds. Although of different shapes, all are small to medium-sized tumuli and are roughly contemporary, dating from the late Kofun period, or the first half of the 5th century. Archaeological excavations were conducted in 1929 and 1989, during which time a large quantity of cylindrical and figurative (house shaped, equipment shaped) haniwa were discovered. In the keyhole-shaped tumulus, a granite sarcophagus was found in the center of the posterior circular portion, containing the bones of an adult male. Grave goods included bronze mirrors, beads and other jewelry, iron swords, iron spearheads, and iron farming implements such as sickles. A total of 26 burials were discovered in and around the remaining tumuli. Cylindrical and figurative haniwa were also excavated.

Tumulus No.1 - This is a circular tumulus with a diameter of 28 meters and height of four meters, in two tiers. The surface was covered in fukiishi and haniwa. The sarcophagus was made of granite and was located in a burial chamber with a vestibule. Grave goods included one bronze mirror, two stone swords, 12 iron swords, four spearheads and two iron axes and two iron sickles, as well as 500 glass beads. In additional 15 subordinate burials were found at the foot of the mound.

Tumulus No.2 - This is a circular tumulus with a diameter of 26 meters and height of 3.5 meters. Haniwa have been found on the surface, but no fukiishi. The details of the burial chamber are unclear, as the tumulus has not been excavated. In addition, 10 subordinate burials are found on the west side of the mound.

Tumulus No.3 - This is a square tumulus 17 meters on each side and with a height of 2 meters. Haniwa have been found on the surface, but no fukiishi. The details of the burial chamber are unclear; however, excavations have found large pot which originated from the western end of the Seto Inland Sea.

Tumulus No.4 - This is a small keyhole-shaped tumulus with a total length of 29 meters.Both Haniwa and fukiishi been found on the surface. The details of the burial chamber are unclear.

Tumulus No.5 - This is a square tumulus 13 meters on each side and with a height of 2 meters. The burial chamber contained a split bamboo-shaped wooden coffin with a length of 6.4 meters.Numerous grave goods were found.

Currently, the site, together with the Ebisuyama Kofun, is open to the public as the Yosano Municipal Kofun Park after the restoration.

== Gallery ==
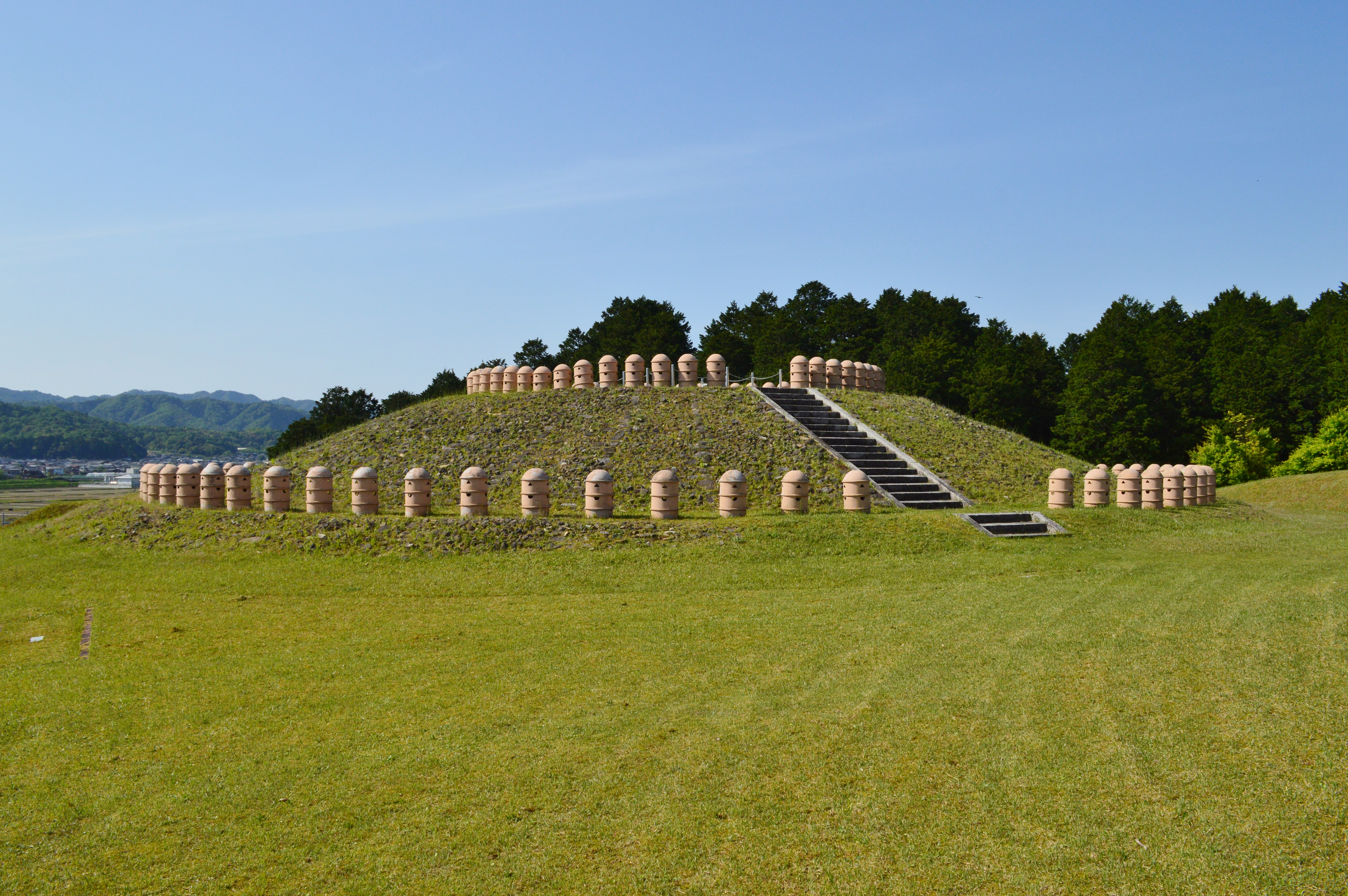
Tumulus No.1

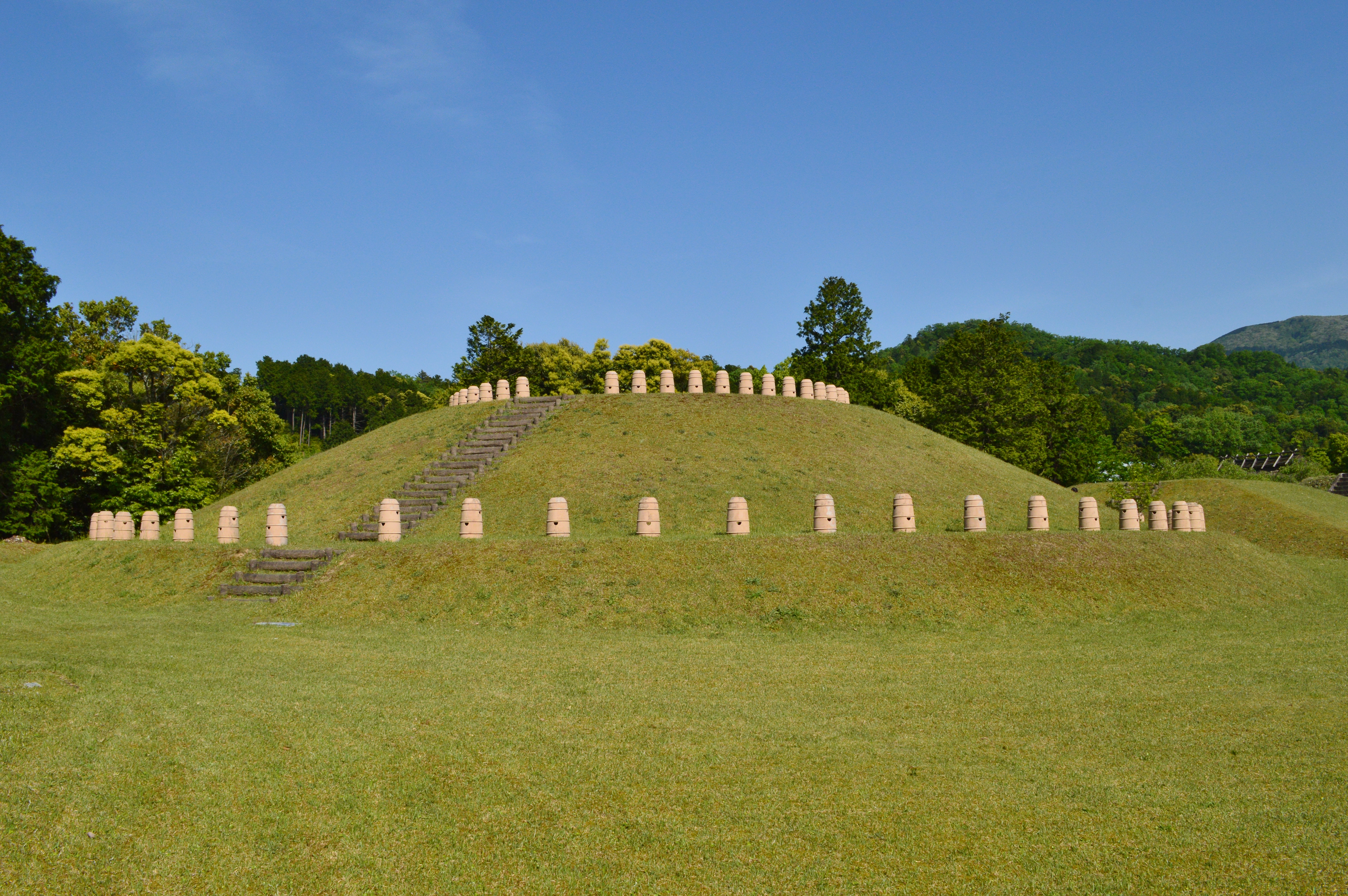
Tumulus No.2

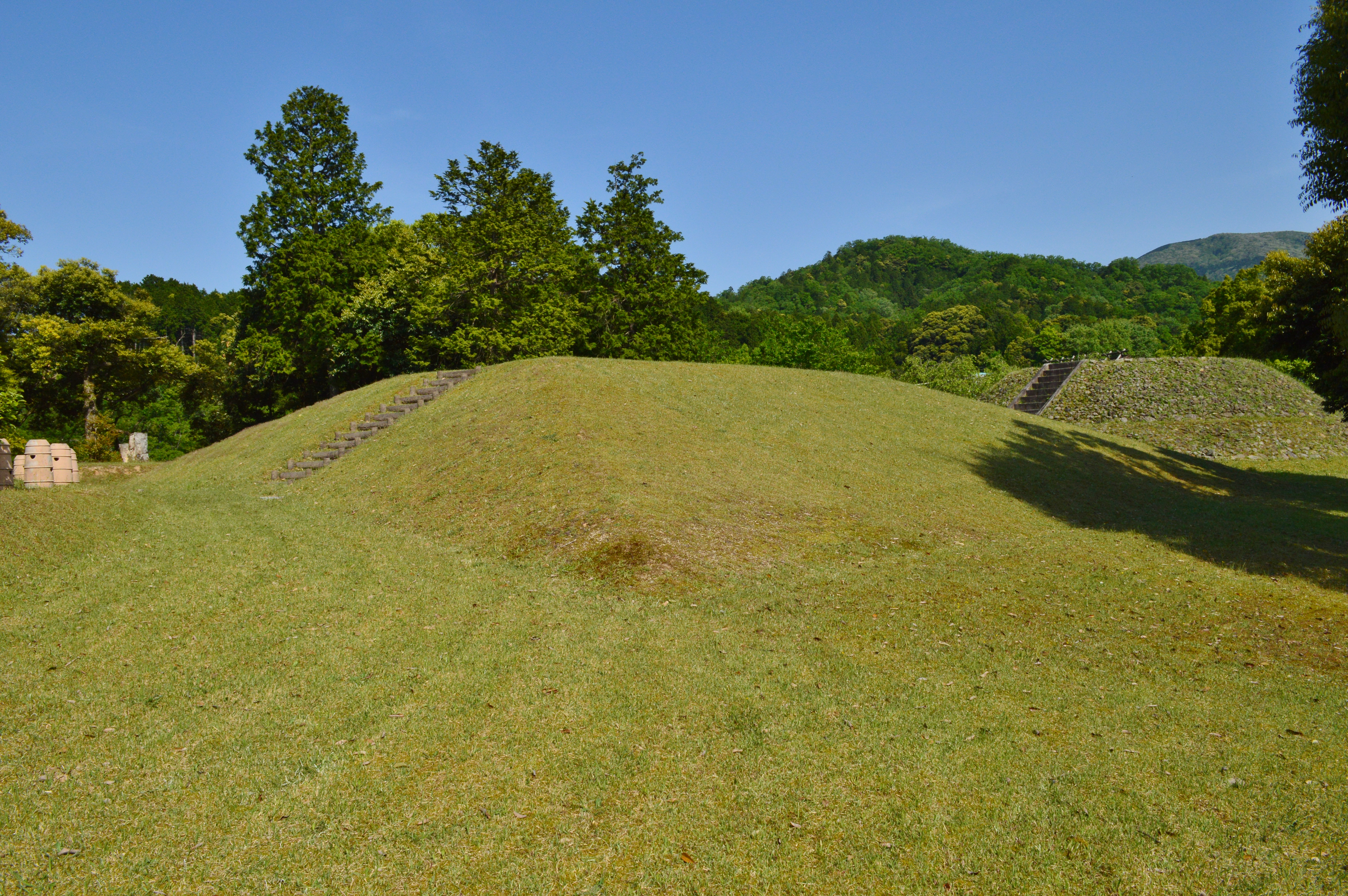
Tumulus No.3

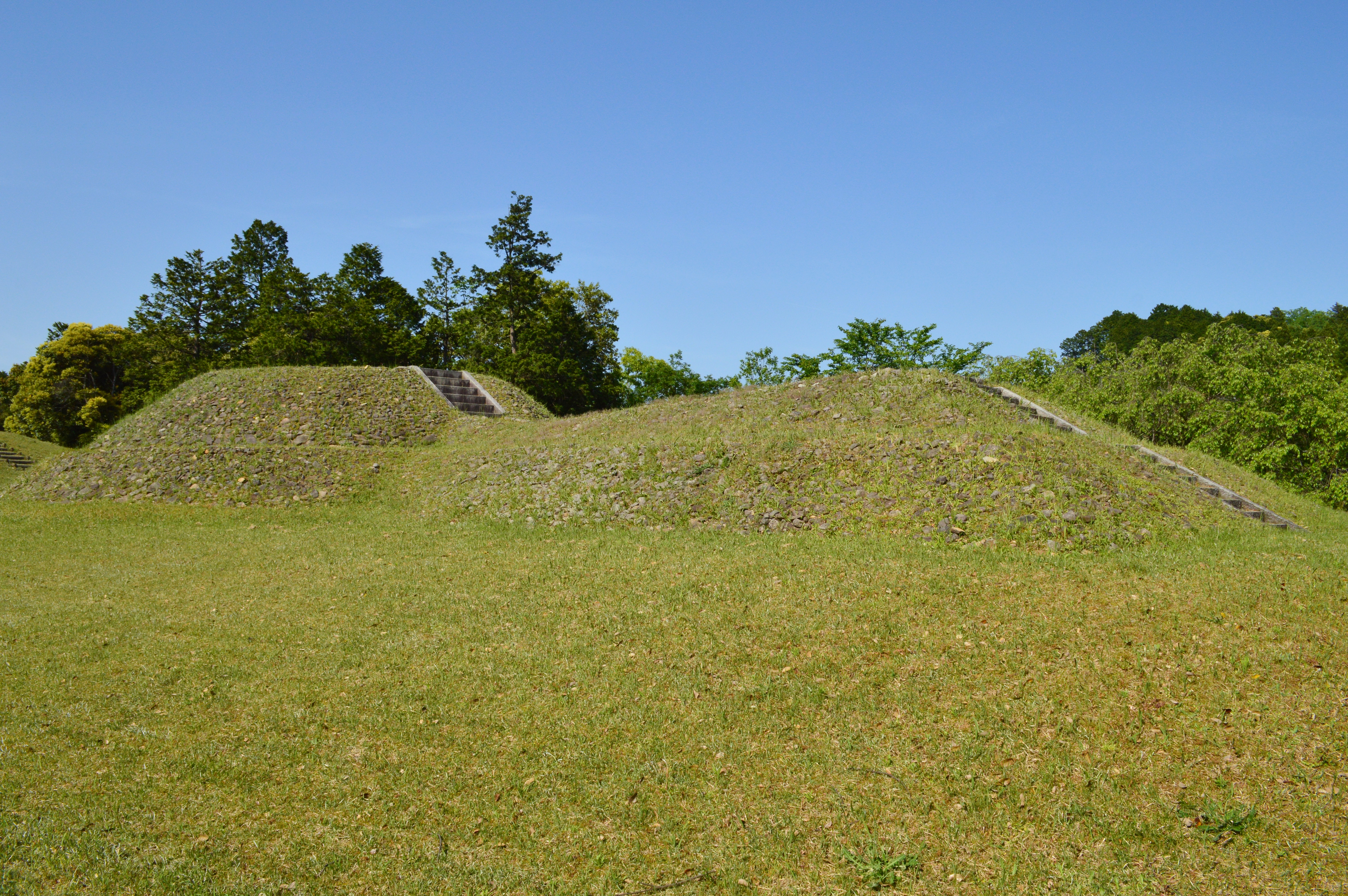
Tumulus No.4

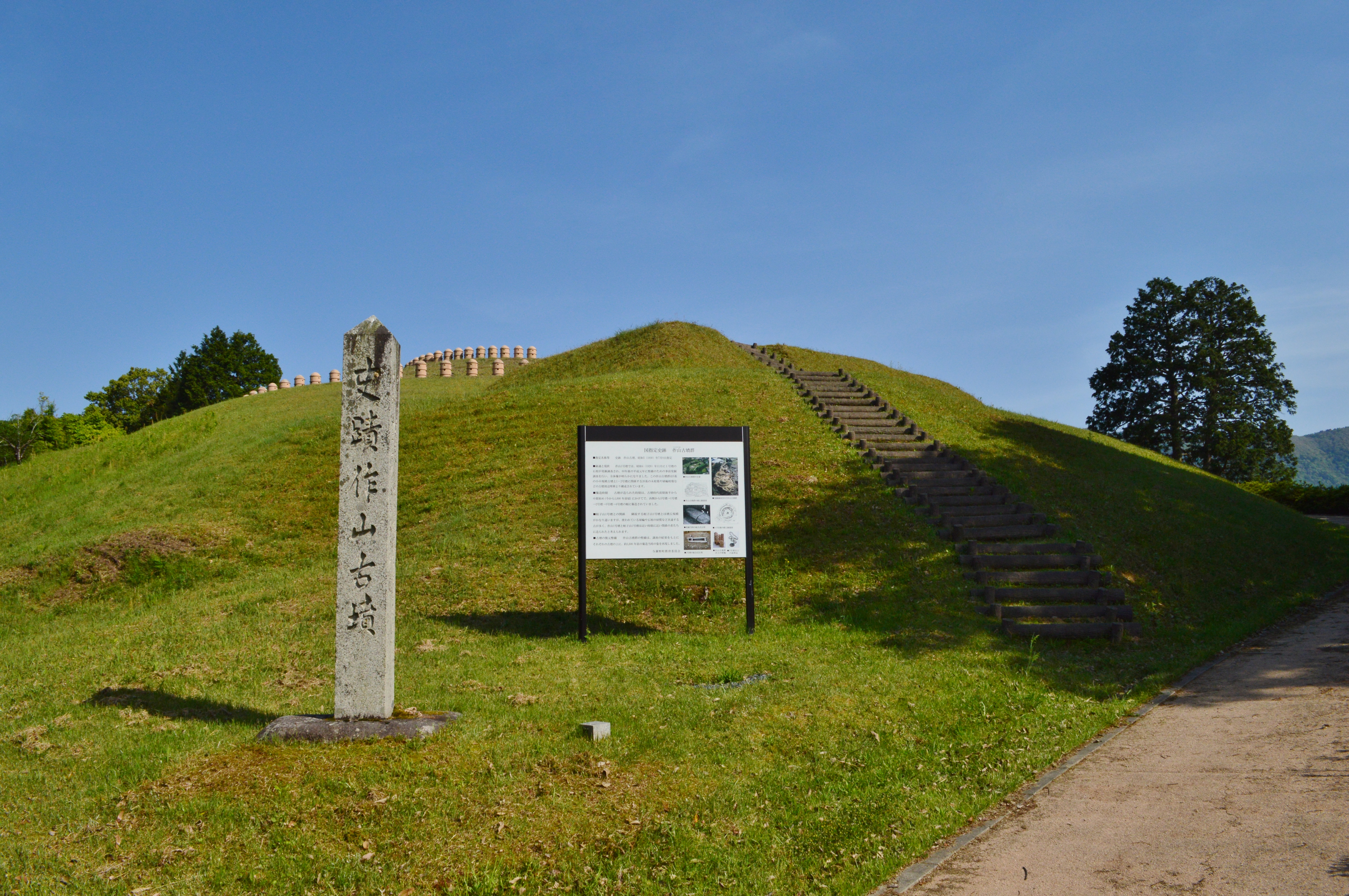
Tumulus No.4

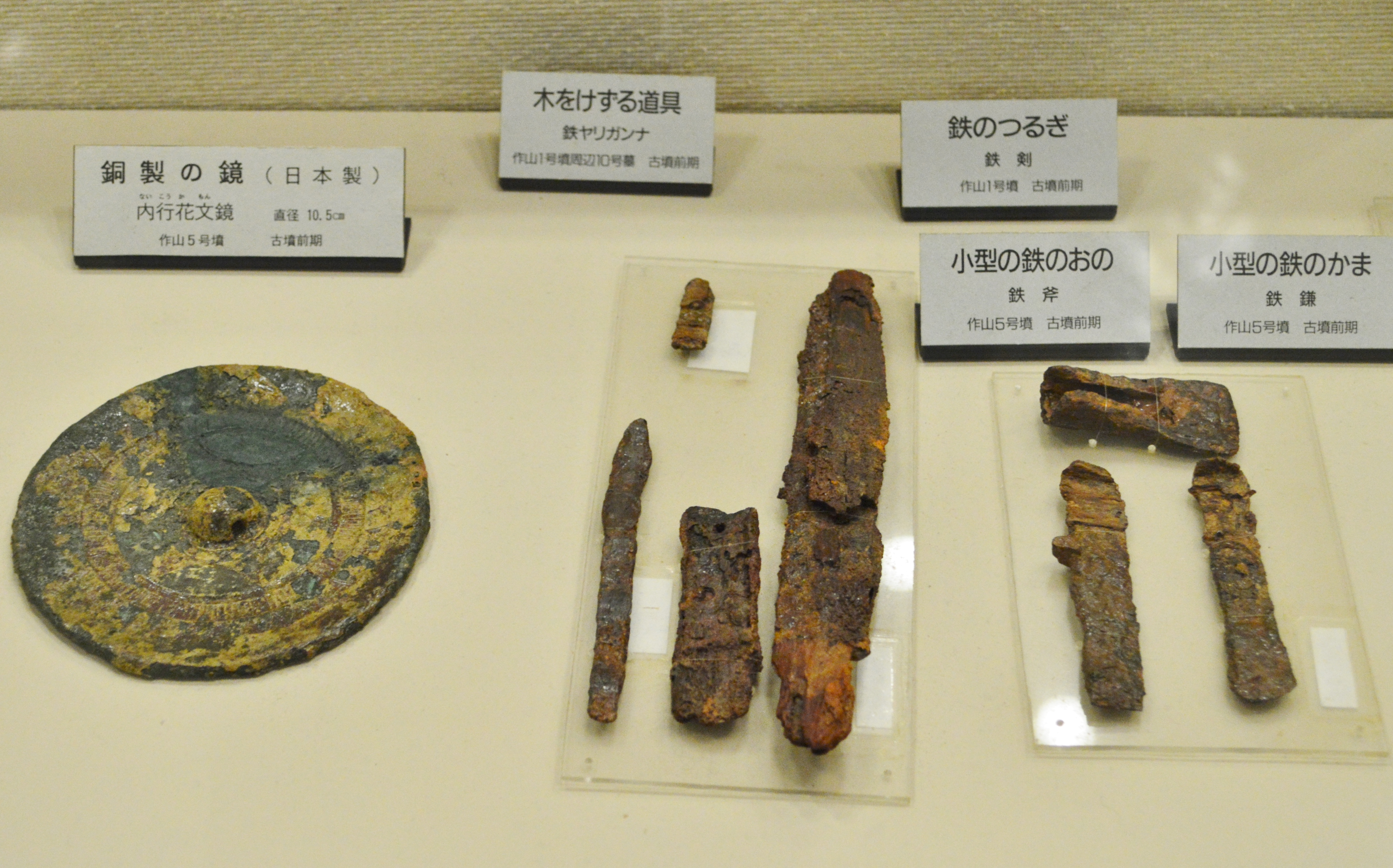
Metal grave goods from Tumulus No.1 and No.5

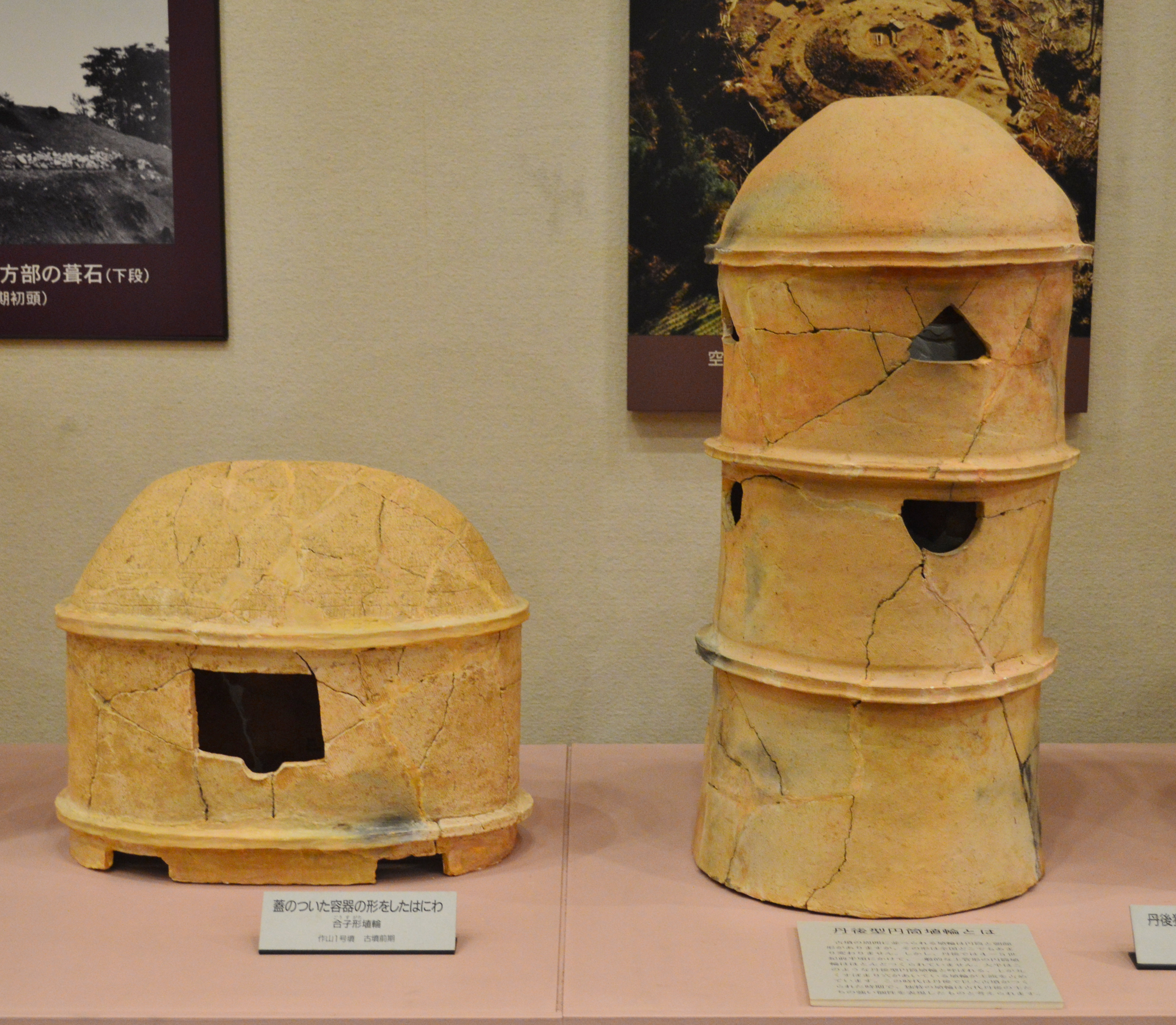
Haniwa from Tumulus No.1

== See also ==
- List of Historic Sites of Japan (Kyoto)
