= Tōnō =

Tōnō region (red) in Gifu Prefecture

Tōnō (東濃) is the southeastern portion of Gifu Prefecture in the Chūbu region of Japan. The Tōnō region received its name as a combination of the kanji for "east" (東) and "Mino" (美濃). The borders of this region are not officially set, but it generally consists of the following cities: Tajimi, Toki, Mizunami, Ena and Nakatsugawa. Occasionally, Kani, usually part of the Chūnō region, is also included as being part of Tōnō.

== Geography ==
The region has a total area of approximately 1,562.9 km^{2} (603.4 sq mi). The Toki River forms the border between it and Nagano Prefecture to the east and Aichi Prefecture to the south. The Kiso River flows through the central area from east to west.

== Population ==
As of 2008 the Tōnō region had about 358,000 residents, which was 17% of the prefecture's entire total.

== Features ==
- It is broadly divided into Tōnō Seibu (東濃西部) in the west with Tajimi, Toki, and Mizunami; and Tōnō Tōbu (東濃東部) in the east with Ena and Nakatsugawa. Additionally, Tōnō Tōbu is divided into north and south by the former boundaries of Ena and Nakatsugawa, with Keinan (恵南) in the south and Keihoku (恵北) in the north.
- The Chūō Main Line, Japan National Route 19, and Chūō Expressway are the main traffic routes through the region. Because of this, compared with Gifu and other regions within the prefecture, it has better connections with places along Route 19 (formerly the Shitakaido) like Nagoya and Kasugai and along Route 363 like Seto. To go to places like Seinō and the Gifu region it's often faster to go through Aichi Prefecture via Komaki Junction in Komaki or Nagoya Station. This is largely because the Takayama Main Line and Taita Line that run between Gifu Station and Tajimi Station are not electrified and have few trains with small numbers of cars. Additionally, the prefectural boundary makes a northward arc along the Kiso River. However, due to the opening of the Toyota-higashi, Toki, and Mino-Seki junctions on the Tōkai-Kanjō Expressway, highway access has improved to the Chūnō region and the Nishimikawa region in Aichi Prefecture. Additionally, there are strong connections with Nagano Prefecture across the eastern border, especially the Chūshin and Nanshin regions.
- In the Ritsuryō period, it formed one part of the Tōsandō, and generally was associated with Toki District and Ena District. In the Edo period it was generally divided into the Owari Domain (of the Owari-Tokugawa family), Iwamura Domain, and the Naegi Domain with the Nakasendō running through.
- Toki, Tajimi, and Mizunami form a prominent Japanese pottery and porcelain producing region; the pottery is known as Mino ware.
- The climate is a mix of Pacific Ocean side climate (some regions are Central Highland climate) and inland climates. Summer is hot and humid, and winter is cold, but snowfall is little. In recent years, Tajimi has been known for holding the hottest temperature record. On August 16, 2007, Tajimi set the record at the time for the hottest temperature in Japan along with Kumagaya, Saitama at 40.9 °C.
- There are many basins formed by the Kiso River and Toki River water system, and many towns were built around their respective basins. Akechi, Kamiyahagi, and Kushihara in the south of Ena belong to the Yahagi River water system.

== Transportation ==
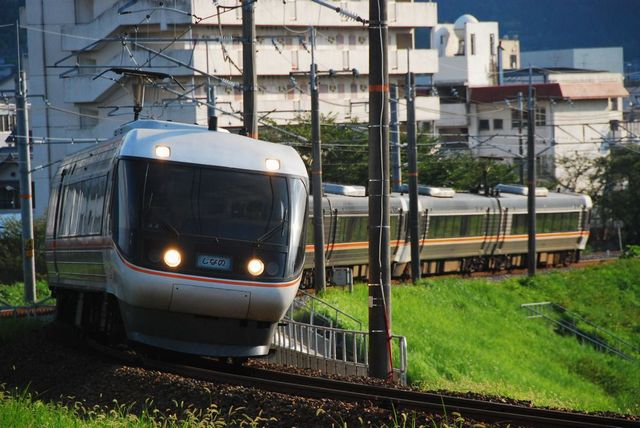
Shinano near Ena Station

=== Rail lines ===
- JR Central
  - Chūō Main Line
  - Chūō Shinkansen
  - Taita Line
- Akechi Line
- Closed lines
  - Tōnō Railway (now Tohtetsu) Dachi Line (closed in 1974) and Kasahara Line (closed in 1978)
  - Iwamura Tramway (closed in 1935)
  - Kitaena Railway (now Kitaena Kotsu) Oi Line (closed in 1934) and Kitaena Line (closed in 1978)
  - Sakagawa Railway (closed in 1944, then transferred to the Nagano regional forestry office's Sakashita field office, and finally closed in 1956)

=== Main roadways ===
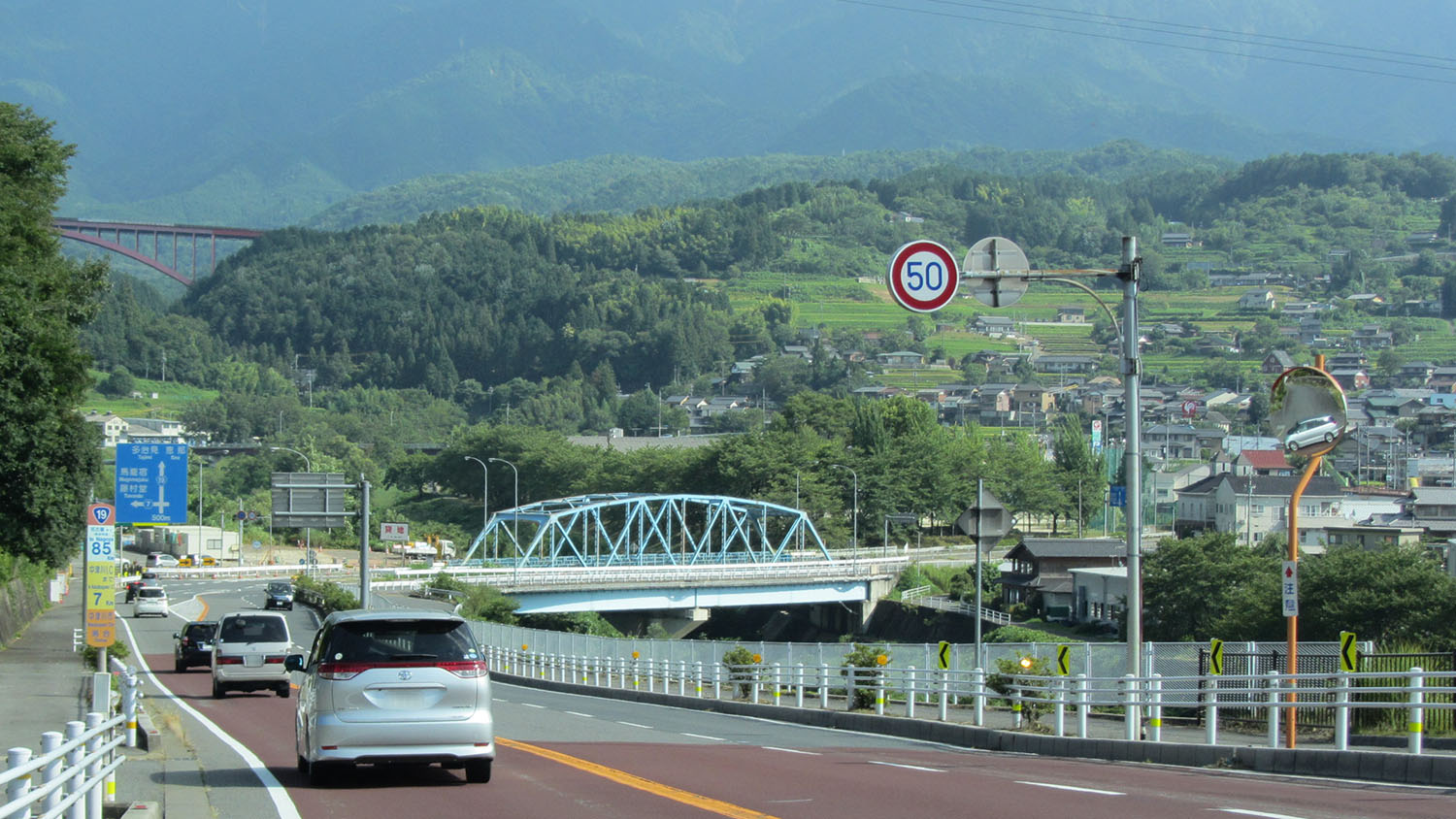
Route 19 in Nakatsugawa

- Chūō Expressway
- Tōkai-Kanjō Expressway
- National Route 19
- National Route 21
- National Route 248
- National Route 257
- National Route 363

=== Bus companies ===
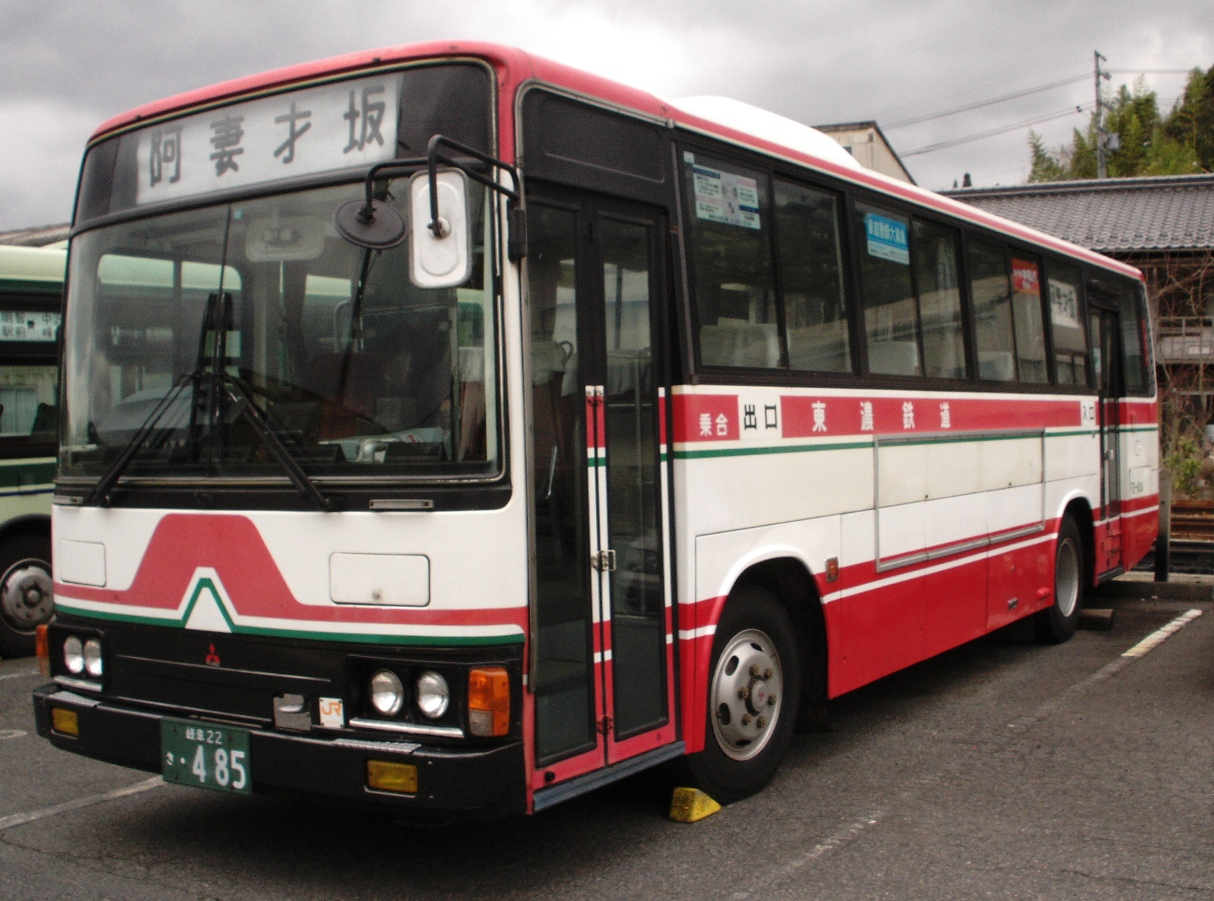
Tohtetsu bus at Akechi Station

- Tohtetsu
- Kitaena Kotsu
- Ontake Kotsu
- Nohi Bus

== Gallery ==
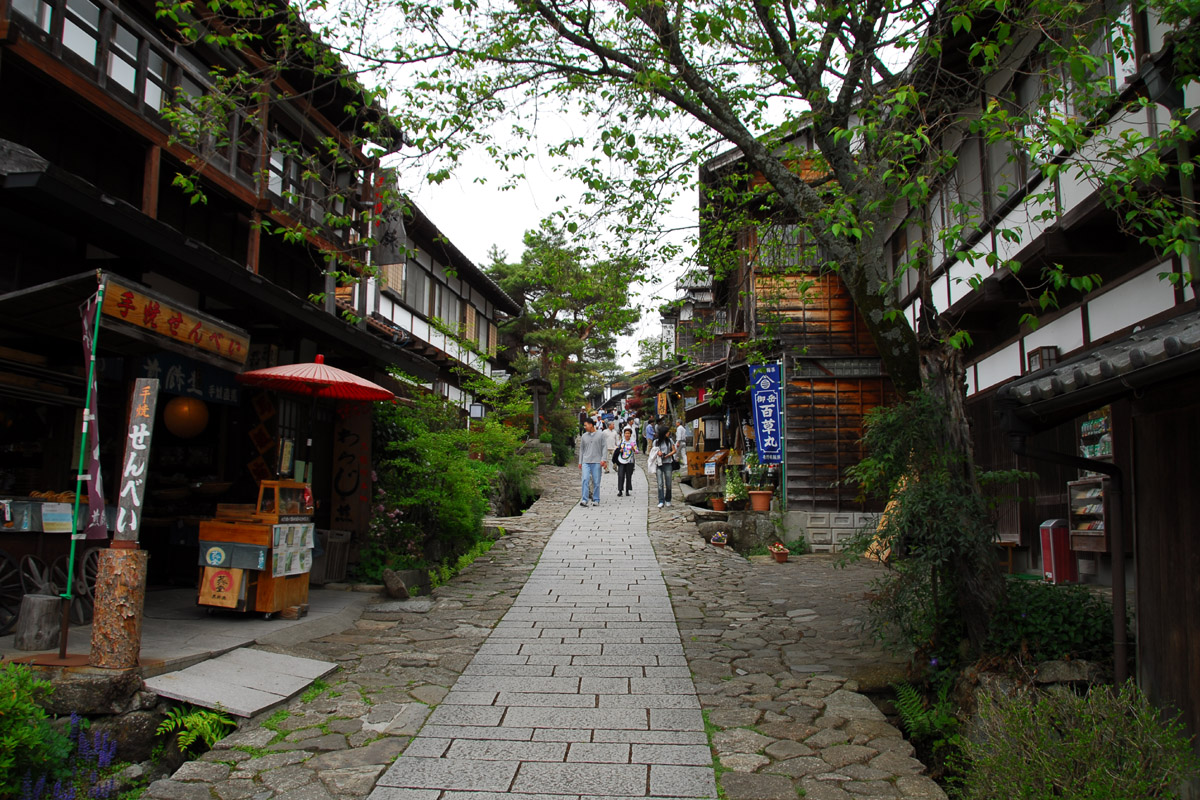
Magome-juku

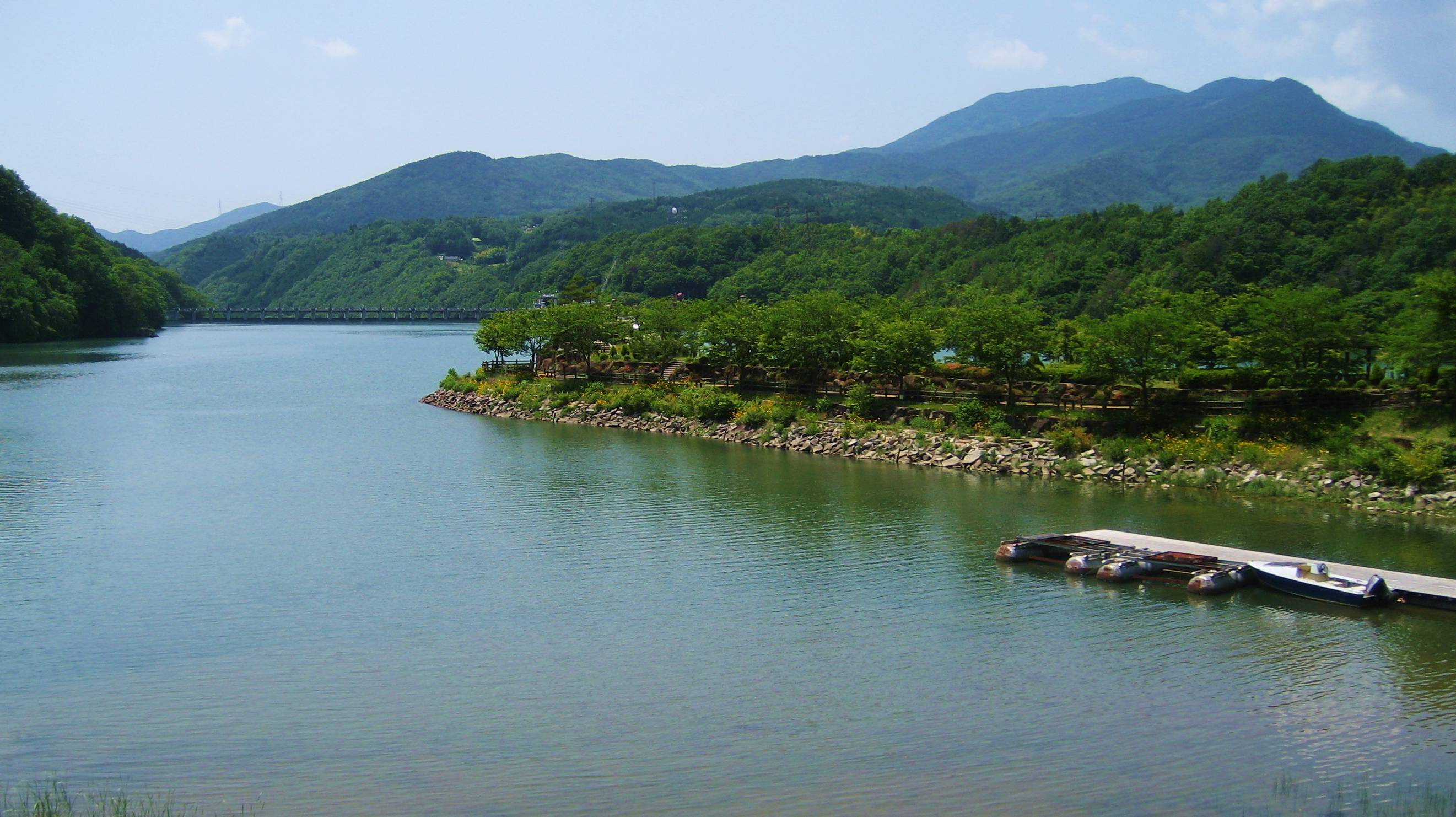
Ena Gorge

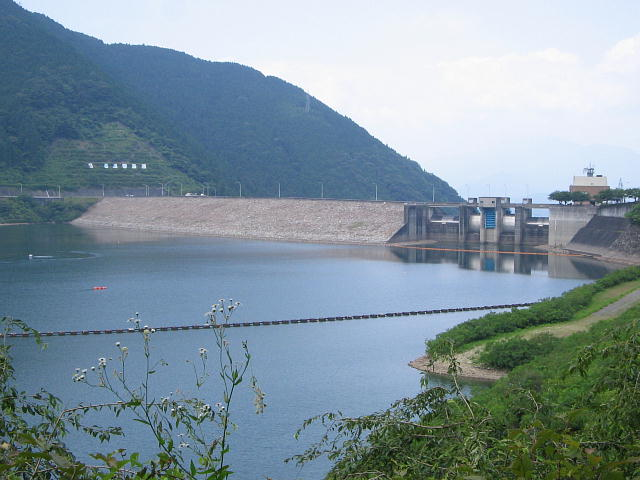
Agigawa Dam

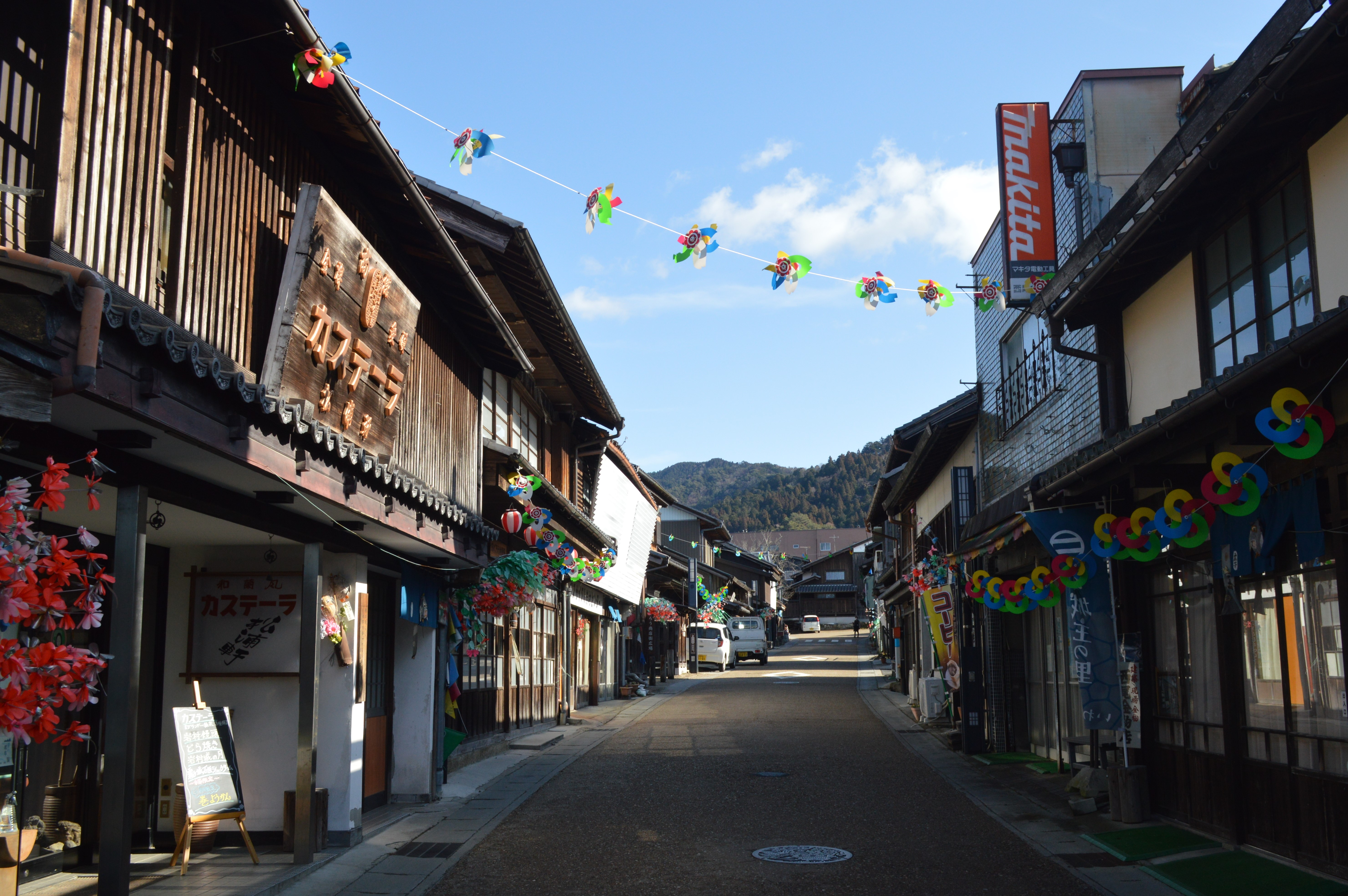
Hondōri Iwamura-chō, one of the Groups of Traditional Buildings

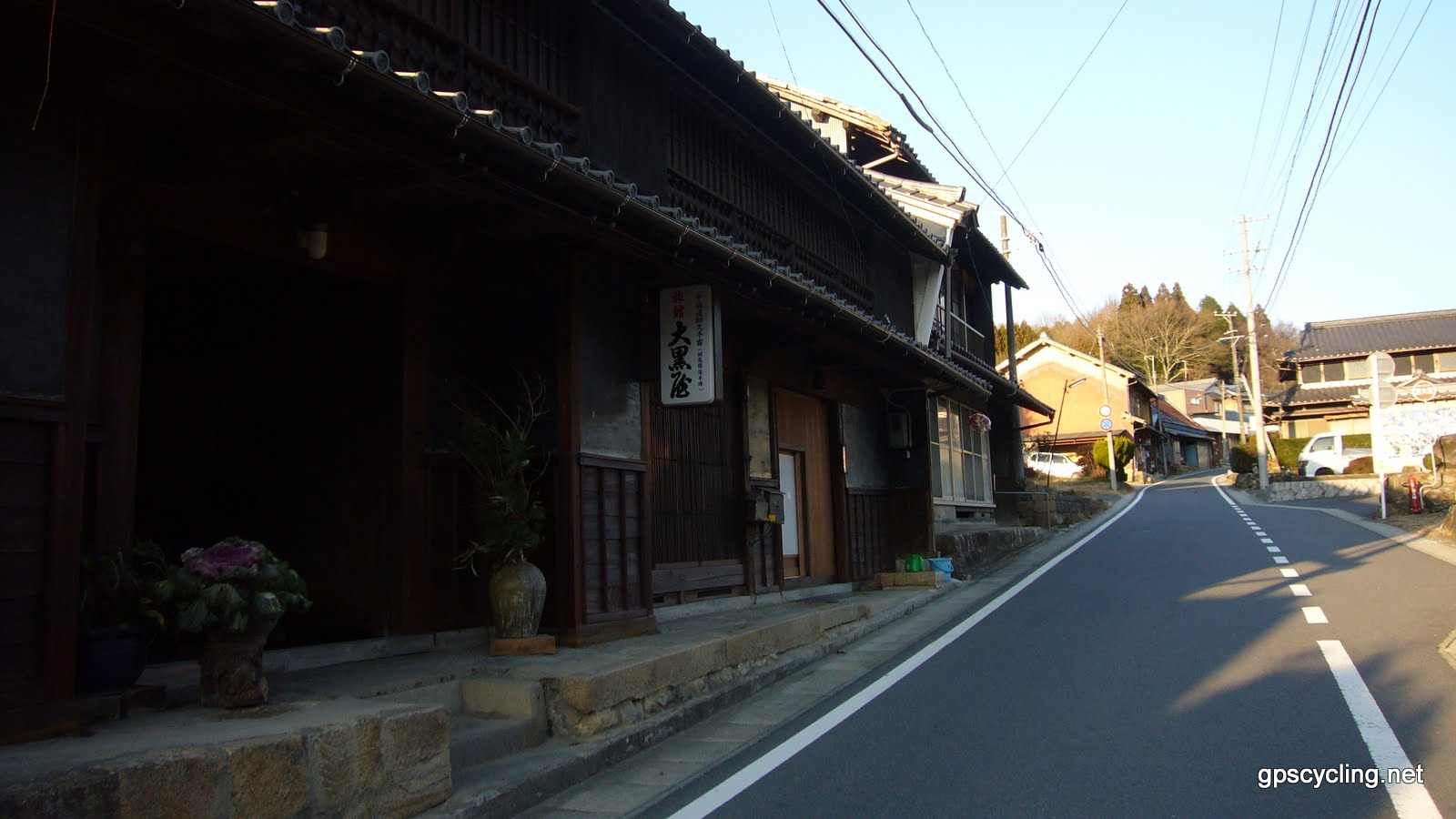
Hosokute-juku

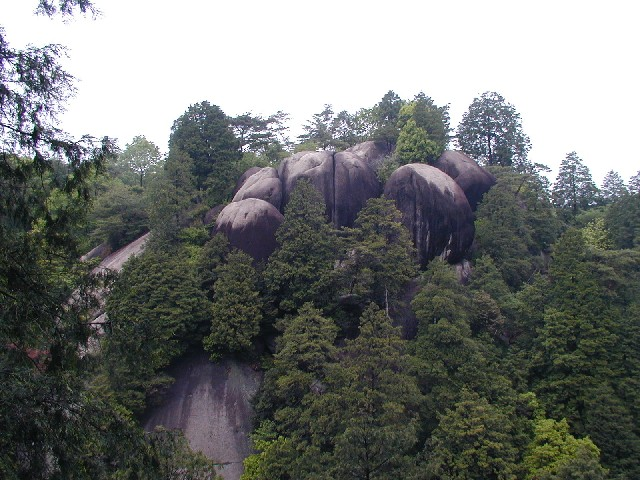
Oniiwa Park

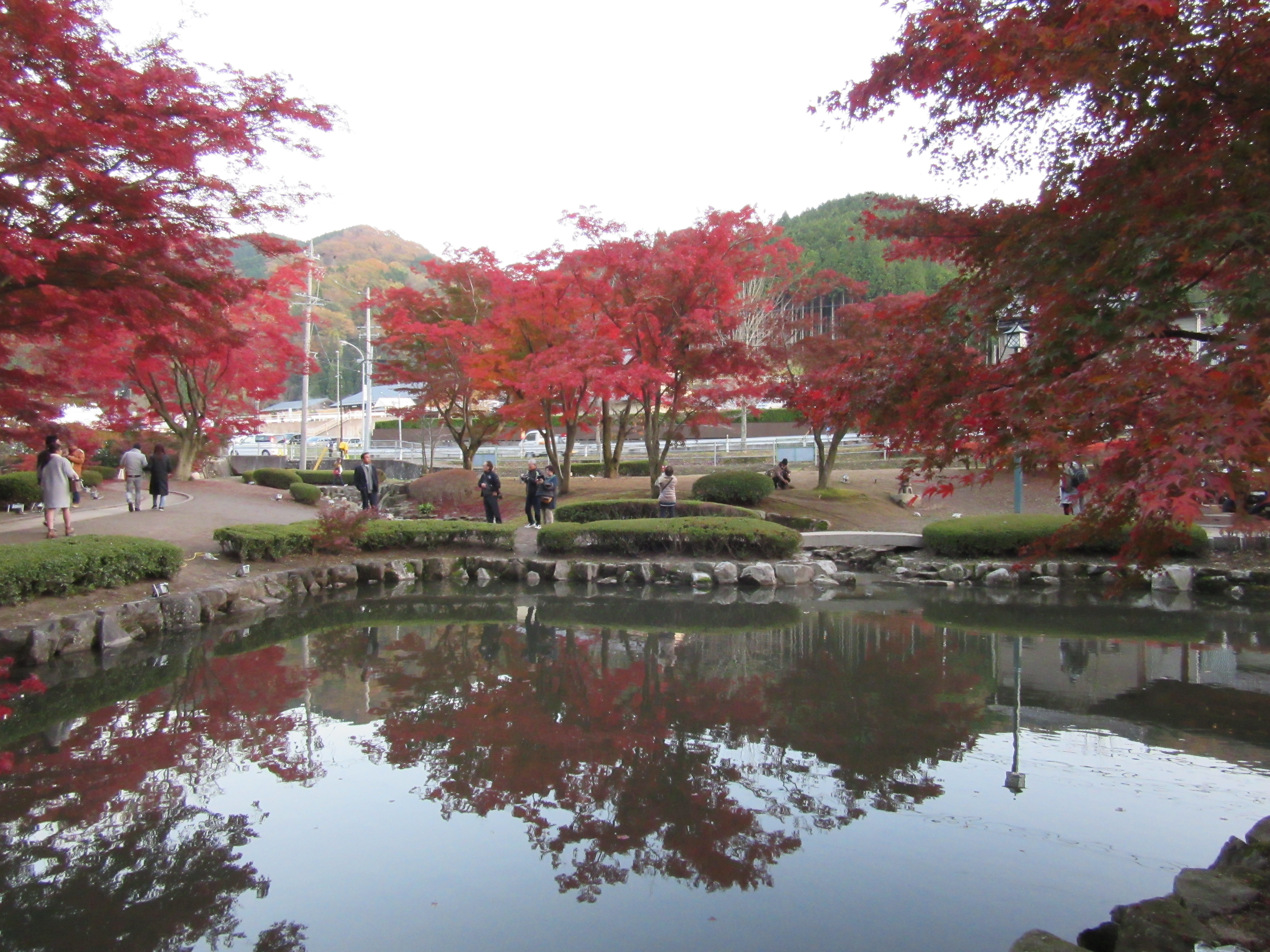
Sogi Park

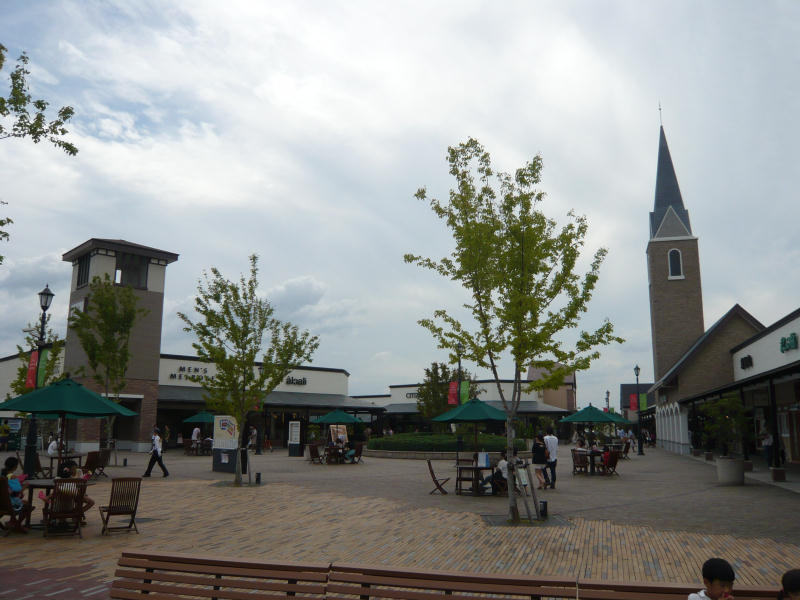
Toki Premium Outlets

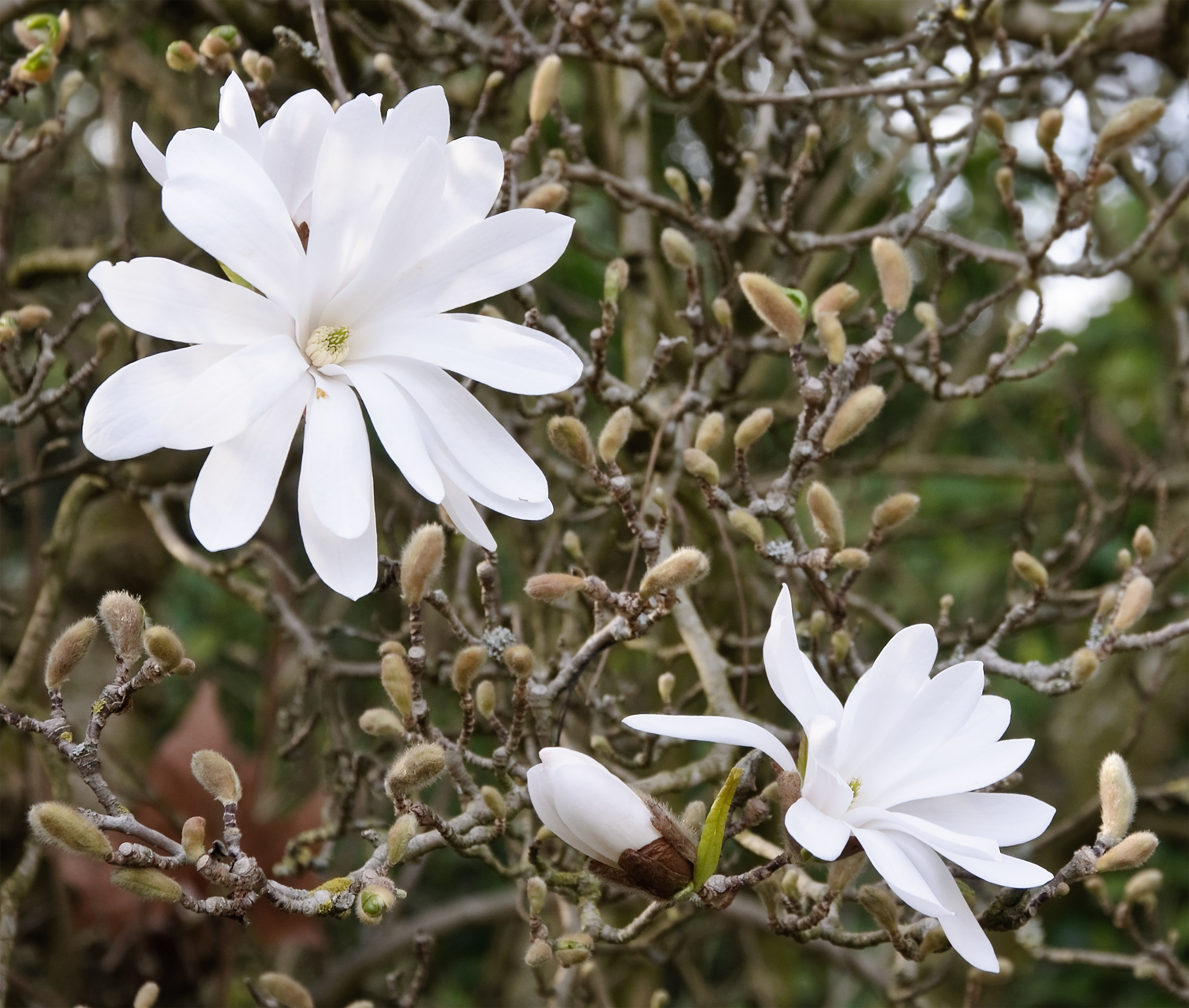
Star magnolia, city tree of Tajimi

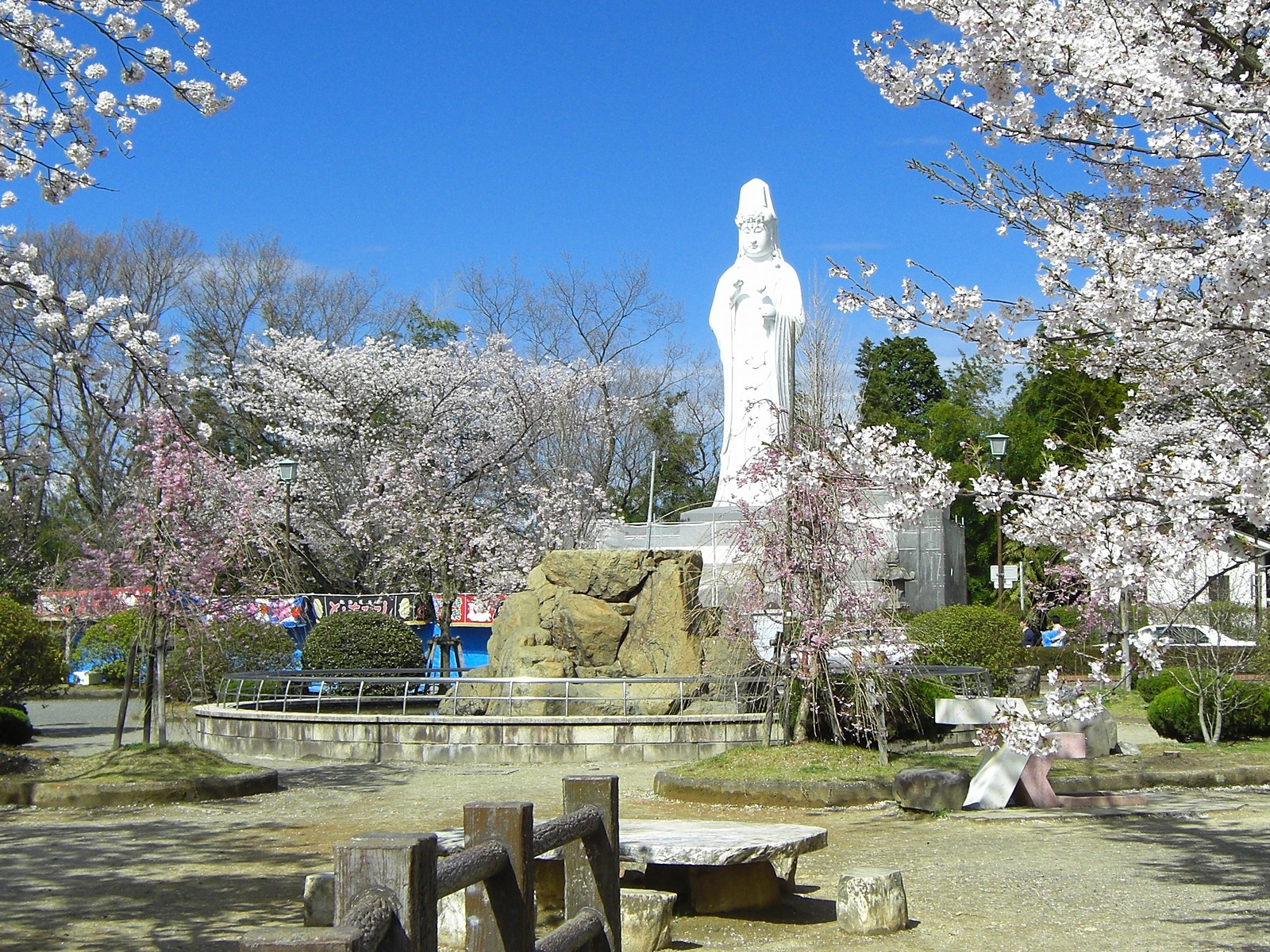
Kokei Park

== See also ==
- Seinō
- Gifu
- Chūnō
- Hida
- Half Blue Sky - NHK TV drama which ran in the first half of 2018. Set in the fictitious town of Fukuro, Higashimino, the main street of Iwamura in Ena was used as the main filming location. Other locations in Tōnō were also used as filming locations.
