= Chuno =

Chuno may refer to the following:

- Chuño, a freeze-dried potato product traditionally made by Quechua and Aymara communities of Peru and Bolivia
- Chūnō, the central portion of Gifu Prefecture in the Chūbu region of Japan
- Chuno, a 2010 Korean drama also known as The Slave Hunters,
