= Seinō =

Coordinates: 35°24′27″N 136°34′16″E

Seinō region (purple) in Gifu Prefecture

Seinō (Japanese: 西濃) is the southwestern portion of Gifu Prefecture in the Chūbu region of Japan. Before Gifu became a prefecture, the area was part of Mino Province. The Seinō region received its name as a combination of the kanji for "west" (西) and "Mino" (美濃), and is sometimes referred to by the unabbreviated name of Nishi Mino. The borders of this region are not officially set, but it generally consists of the following cities and towns: Ōgaki, Kaizu, Gōdo, Wanouchi, Anpachi, Ibigawa, Ōno, Ikeda, Yōro, Tarui and Sekigahara.

== Geography ==
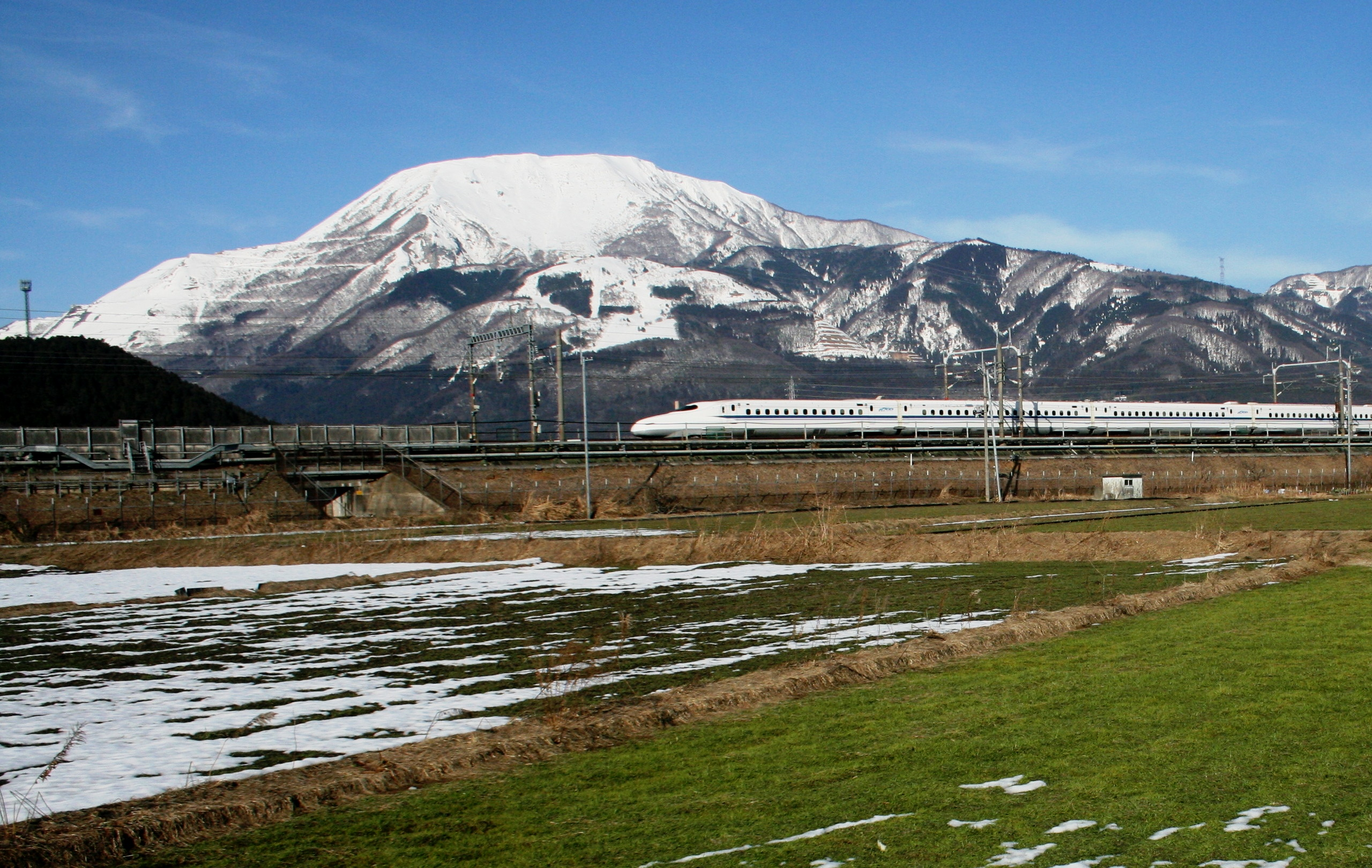
Mount Ibuki

The northern part of the region is separated from Fukui Prefecture by mountain peaks that reach over 1,000 m (3,281 ft) high, whereas the western part is separated from Mie and Shiga prefectures by Mount Ibuki and the Ibuki Mountains. The southern part of the region lies at sea level and connects to Aichi and Mie prefectures. The Kiso Three Rivers flow through the eastern part of the region and connect Seinō with the Gifu region and Aichi Prefecture.

== Population ==
Approximately 300,000 people live in the Seinō region. Of those, about half live in the main city of Ōgaki.

== Industries ==
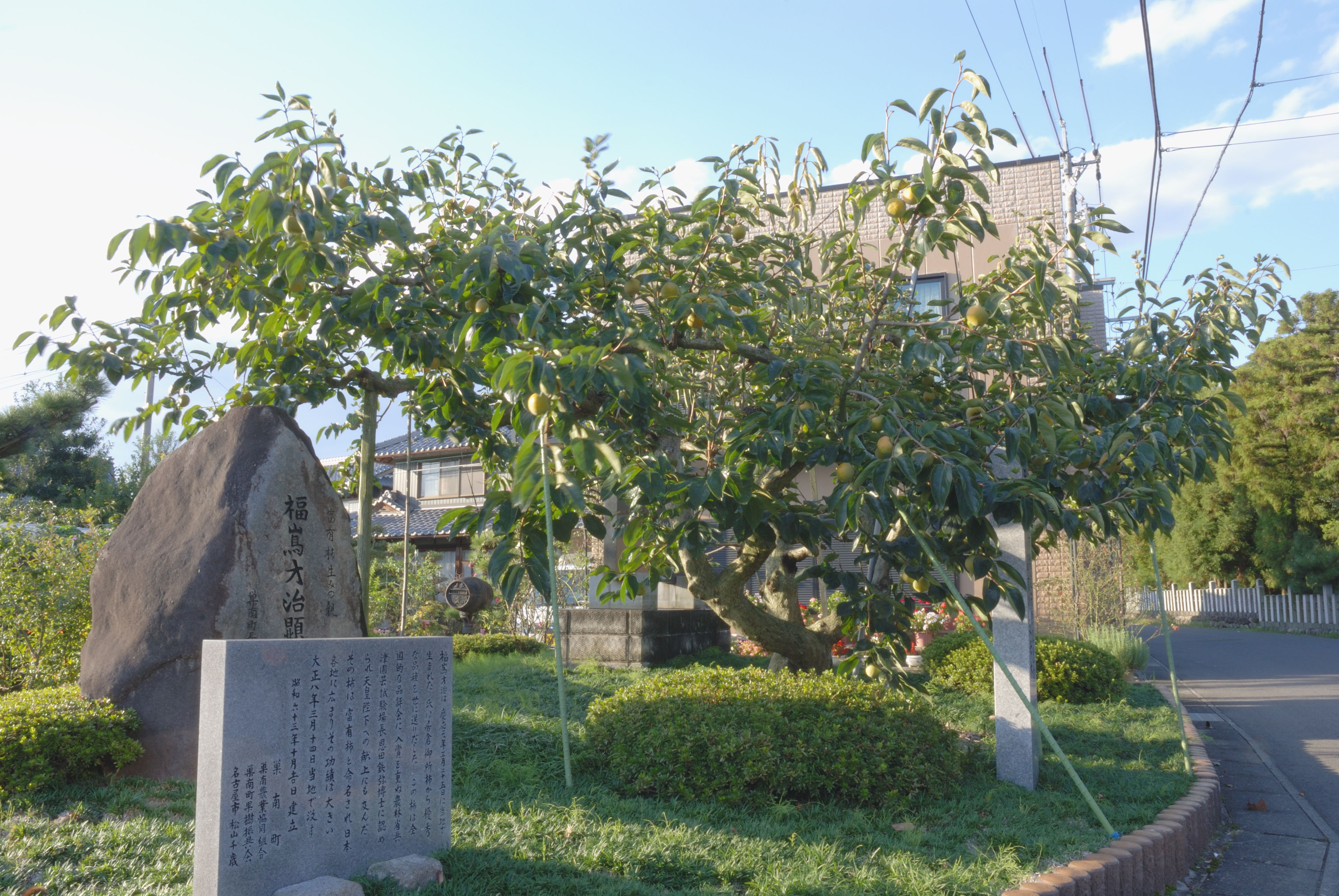
Fuyu persimmon tree

The towns of Ibigawa, Ōno and Ikeda, as well as the city of Ōgaki, are known for their production of Fuyu (富有 Fuyū), a type of persimmon.

Ōgaki is also the home to major companies such as Ibiden Co., Seino Co., Pacific Industrial Co. and Ogaki Kyoritsu Bank. Other companies, including Seria Co., a 100-yen shop, also have a strong presence in the region.

== See also ==
- Gifu
- Chūnō
- Tōnō
- Hida
