= Hondōri Iwamura-chō =

Coordinates: 35°21′58.25″N 137°26′21.35″E

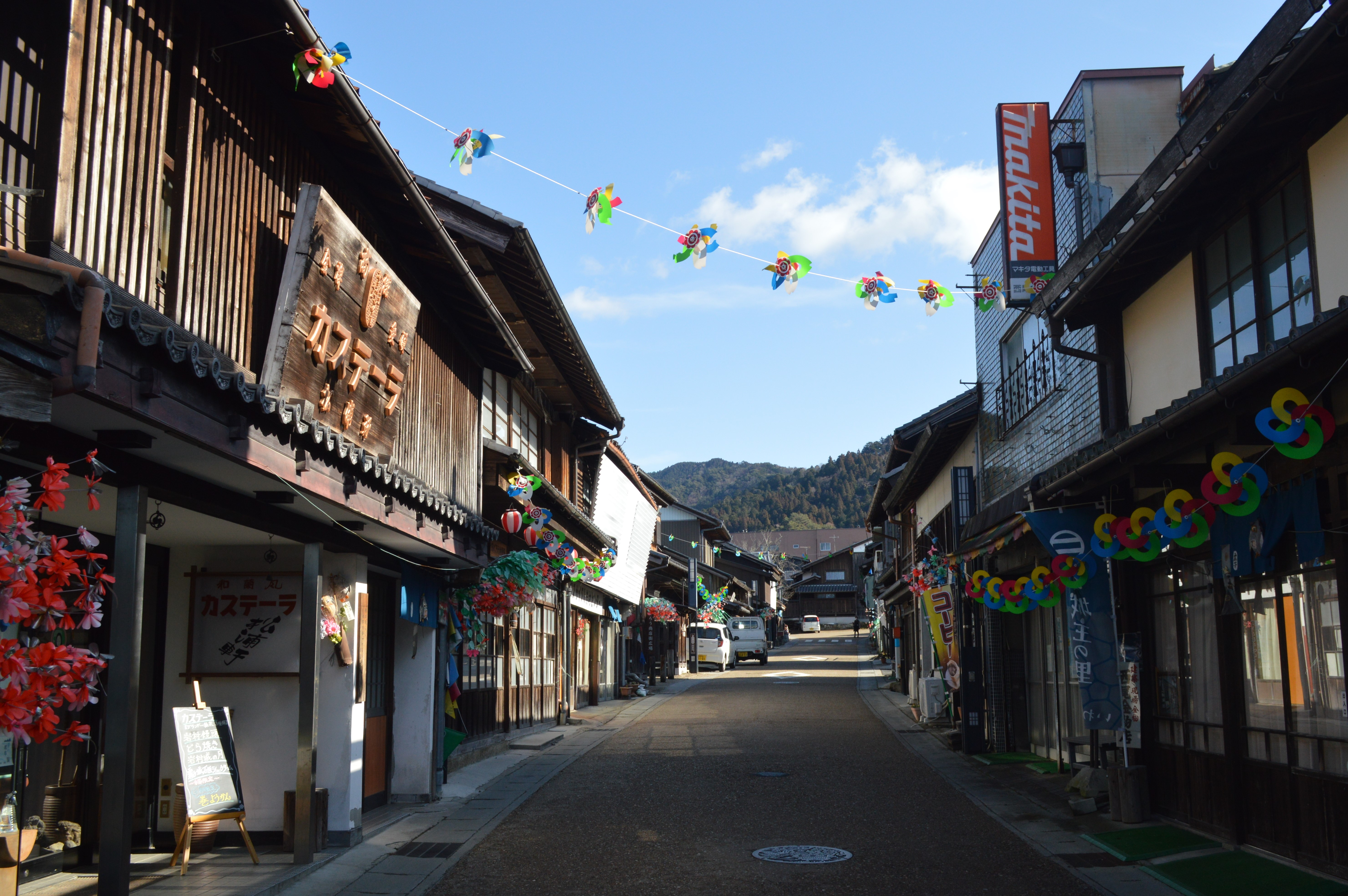
Main street of Iwamura

Hondōri Iwamura-chō (恵那市岩村町本通り, Ena-shi Iwamura-chō hondōri) is the name of the town center of Iwamura in Ena, Gifu Prefecture, and was designated as one of the Important Preservation Districts for Groups of Traditional Buildings on April 17, 1998. It is the merchant district of a former castle town that prospered during the Edo period as a political, cultural and economic center of the Tōnō region.

== Overview ==
- The Ogyū-Matsudaira clan (illegitimately descended from the Matsudaira clan), who ruled Iwamura Castle in the first part of the Edo period, created the model for the townscape. It prospered as the castle town of the 30,000 koku Iwamura Domain. Its area is around 14.6 ha (36 acres), and it is long and thin, being around 1.3 km (0.81 mi) in length from east to west.
- From the masugata (枡形) to the east side was the merchant quarter area of the former castle town. In the present day, most of the Edo period buildings have been remodeled. However, many of them have original features preserved such as the shorter second floor, 厨子二階 (tsushi nikai). The building plots are long and stretch from north to south. Common features are gables and gabled roofs, latticework, and tiled roofs. Some have Namako walls and others have barred windows (武者窓, musha-mado), lit. 'warrior windows'. Houses from each period from the first part of the Edo period through to the present day line the street.
- The area from the masugata to the west side was built starting from the last part of the Edo period up until the opening of the Iwamura Tramway in 1906. These houses were built with the living room on the second floor and tall eaves.

== Highlights ==
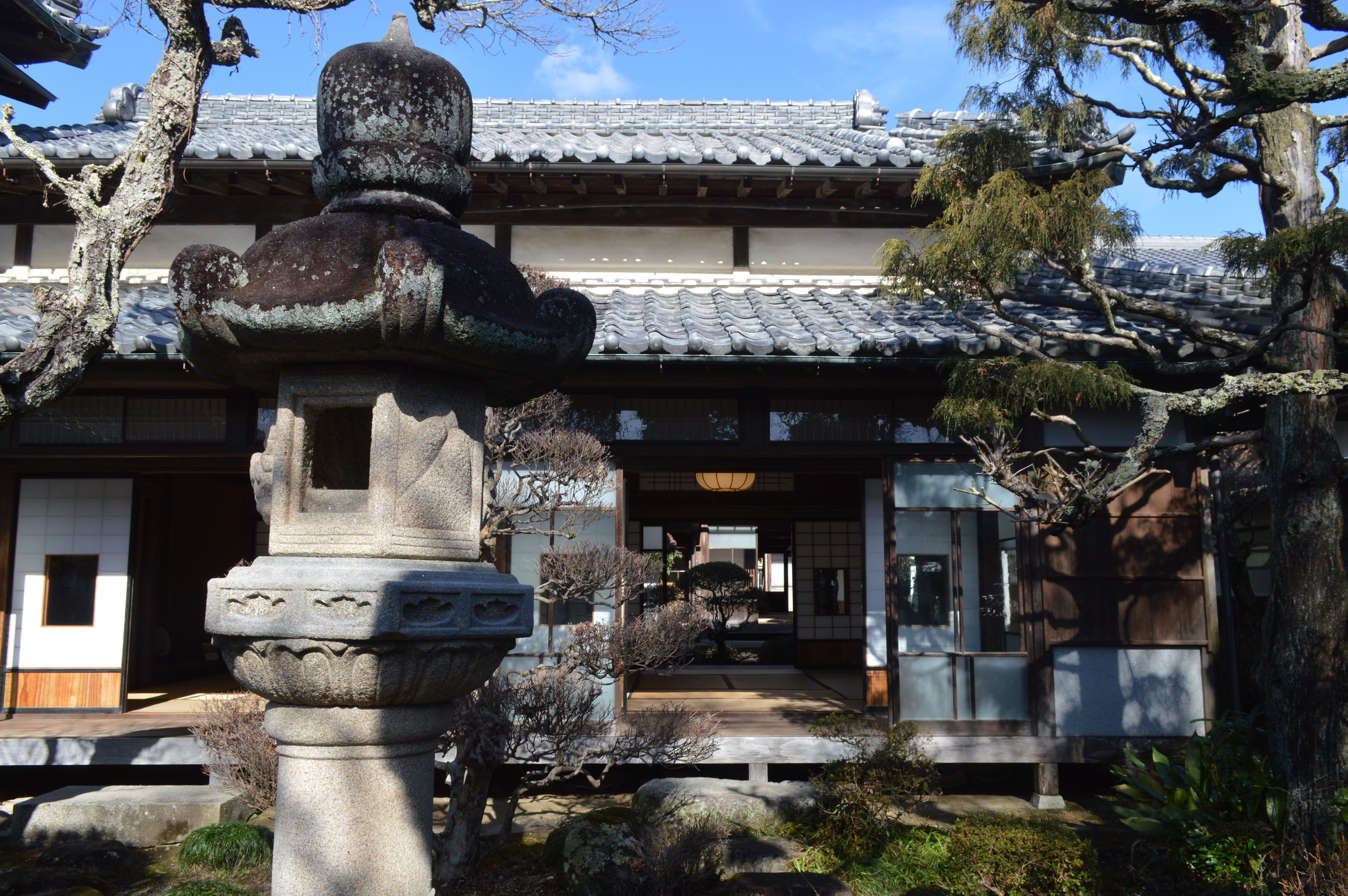
Kachigawa House

- Kimura Estate
- Kachigawa House
- Shibata House (Iwamura Art Gallery)
- Tosa-ya (Crafts Gallery)
- Iwamura Brewery: Sake brewery founded in the Edo period.

== Access ==
- 20 minutes' drive south on Route 257 from Ena IC on the Chūō Expressway
- 10 minutes' walk from Iwamura Station on the Akechi Line

== See also ==
- Half Blue Sky
