= Gifu (disambiguation) =

Gifu is the capital city of Gifu Prefecture, Japan.

Gifu (岐阜) may also refer to:

- Gifu Prefecture, located in the Chūbu region of central Japan
- Gifu (region), a region located in southcentral Gifu Prefecture
- "The Gifu", a Japanese stronghold on Guadalcanal during World War II, captured during the Battle of the Gifu in December 1942
