= Battle of Dōdō =

1565 battle in Japan

- Part of Sengoku period
Date	22 September 1565
Location	Chūnō, Mino Province
Result	Oda clan victory

Belligerents
Oda clan Kajita clan	Kishi clan Nagai clan

Commanders and leaders
Oda Nobunaga; Satō Tadayoshi	Kishi Nobuchika; Kishi Nobufusa; Kishi Nobusada

Battle of Dōdō Fort (堂洞合戦 Dōdō Kassen) was a battle centered around Dōdō Fort in Chūnō, Mino Province, that took place on 22 September 1565 between Oda Nobunaga's army and the Kajita clan and Kishi Nobuchika, who was on the side of Saitō Tatsuoki.

In July 1565, Satō Tadayoshi, lord of Kajita Castle, got in touch with Nobunaga through Niwa Nagahide. Hearing this, Nobunaga was pleased and sent 50 gold coins to Tadayoshi. However, Saitō Tatsuoki perceived acceptance of Tadayoshi as betrayal towards the Saitō clan.

After the Unuma Castle and Sarutaku Castle fell to the Oda forces, and when Sarutaku Castle's commander, Tajimi Shuri-no-Jyo, fled to Kai Province, the defeated troops entered Dodo Castle and joined forces with Kishi clan's forces. In response, Nobunaga sent Kanamori Nagachika as an envoy to Dōdō Fort, asking Kishi Nobuchika to surrender. However, Nobuchika's son, Nobufusa, refused. Nobufusa even goes so far by beheading his own eldest son in the front of Nagachika to show his resolve to defy Nobunaga.

While the Kishi prepared for battle, Yaeryoku, daughter of Satō Tadayoshi and also Nobuchika's adopted daughter, who has been held hostage by the defender' forces, was crucified at Nagao-Maruyama, facing the Dōdō fort. That night, Tadanobu's vassal, Nishimura Jirobei, sneaked in and took Yaeryoku's corpse from Kishikata and buried it at Ryufukuji Temple in Kajita..

Nobunaga then establish his headquarters at Takahatayama (present-day Takahata, Tomika Town), straddling the Dōdō and Sekima regions. He repelled reinforcements from Seki Castle, led by Nagai Michitoshi, as they crossed the Tsubo River and entered the Takahata forests. Afterward, he relocated his headquarters to Chausuyama (Yuda Chausuyama Tomb), directly facing Dōdō fortress's main structure, and personally rode forward to direct his troops.

The Oda forces in the west were hindered by the rugged terrain and the strong defenses of the Kishi forces' ambushes, while the attacking forces in the north, led by the Sato father and son, advanced up the familiar mountain paths. The defending general, Nobufusa, repeatedly repelled the attackers, but as the battle dragged on, many of his soldiers were wounded and killed. He himself was wounded in three places, and commit seppuku. Ōta Gyūichi, author of Shinchō Kōki, also recorded His own participation in this battle, where he said he served as an archer of Nobunaga army.

== Aftermath ==
After the battle, on their way back to Inuyama, the Oda forces were attacked by Nagai Michitoshi 's forces from Seki and 3,000 troops under Saito Tatsuoki's forces from Inokuchi (Gifu). However, the Oda forces, with only 800 men, were unable to fight, so they retreated to Hirono, where they pretended to prepare a counterattack, before retreating to Unuma. As the forces from Seki Castle appeared to be heading for Kajita Castle, Nobunaga sent Saito Toshiharu as reinforcements. In the end, the Seki Castle fell to the Oda forces.
