= Strangers in the City (2010 film) =

- DVD cover
- Directed by: Junji Sakamoto
- Written by: Shoichi Maruyama
- Based on: Yukizuri no Machi by Tatsuo Shimizu
- Produced by: Mitsuru Kurosawa; Tatsuya Kunimatsu
- Starring: Toru Nakamura; Manami Konishi; Nao Minamisawa; Yosuke Kubozuka; Renji Ishibashi
- Cinematography: Seizo Sengen
- Edited by: Shinichi Fushima
- Music by: Goro Yasukawa
- Distributed by: Toei Company
- Release date: November 20, 2010 (Japan)
- Running time: 123 minutes
- Country: Japan
- Language: Japanese

Strangers in the City (Japanese: 行きずりの街, Hepburn: Yukizuri no Machi) is a 2010 Japanese thriller film directed by Junji Sakamoto, starring Toru Nakamura and Manami Konishi. It is based on the novel of the same title by Tatsuo Shimizu.

== Cast ==
- Tōru Nakamura as Hatano
- Manami Konishi as Masako
- Nao Minamisawa as Yukari
- Yosuke Kubozuka as Nakagome
- Renji Ishibashi as Ikebe
- Shun Sugata as Omori
- Kyoko Enami as Masako's mother
- Arata Iura as Masako's boyfriend
- Tetta Sugimoto as Hatano's former colleague
- Eriko Sato as Hatano's former colleague
- Mitsuki Tanimura as Yukari's friend

== Release ==
Strangers in the City premiered at the Busan International Film Festival on October 11, 2010. It also screened as the North American premiere at the Japan Cuts on July 17, 2011.

== Reception ==
Mark Schilling of The Japan Times criticized Strangers in the City, noting that the director Junji Sakamoto and the screenwriter Shoichi Maruyama could not decide what the film is about. Meanwhile, Russell Edwards of Variety said, "[Manami] Konishi exhibits a powerful range of suppressed emotions as Hatano's former child bride-cum-Tokyo bargirl."
