= Ruri no Shima =

- Also known as: 瑠璃の島 / Ruri's Island
- Genre: Human drama
- Directed by: Inomata Ryuuichi; Ikeda Kenji
- Starring: Riko Narumi; Yutaka Takenouchi; Fumiyo Kohinata; Naomi Nishida; Mitsuko Baisho; Ken Ogata
- Opening theme: Koko ni shika sakanai hana by Kobukuro
- Country of origin: Japan
- Original language: Japanese
- No. of episodes: 10 (+1 special episode)

Production
- Producers: Toda Kazuya; Kunimoto Masahiro; Tsugiya Hisashi
- Running time: Saturday 21:00
- Production company: Nippon Television

Original release
- Network: Nippon Television
- Release: April 16 – June 18, 2005

Ruri no Shima (瑠璃の島) is a Japanese television series which was broadcast on Nippon Television from 16 April to 18 June 2005.

== Synopsis ==
On Hatomi (a fictional name derived from Hatoma, the actual island where the drama was filmed), a small island in Okinawa state part of Japan's southern sea frontier, the social environment is suffering. With the last student of the elementary school leaving the place, the closing of the school is a virtual given. Mr. Nakama (Ken Ogata), decides to do something about it - and heads for Tokyo to recruit his grandson. Rebuffed by his daughter, however, he decides to adopt another child. He finds Ruri (Riko Narumi), a mature girl of 11 who distrusts people because her mother (Naomi Nishida) doesn't care much about her, but after seeing Mr. Nakama's true intentions, allows him to take her to the island. Unfortunately, the local teacher, Ms. Sanae (Manami Konishi), who was banking on the school's closing to be able to go somewhere else, is resentful of Ruri and makes light of her city fashion (including permed hair, fake curls, and miniskirts), which leads to a big showdown between her and Ruri - and the people who were enthusiastic about her suddenly begin to have their doubts, and only Mr. Nakama and his wife Megumi (Mitsuko Baisho) take Ruri's side strongly. Following into the island is Mr. Kawashima (Yutaka Takenouchi), a mysterious man who saves Ruri from drowning following the fight - and who becomes her conscience and friend in her daily life in the island. But is Kawashima what he seems? Or did he come to the island to run away from Tokyo - and possibly a crime he may have been involved in there? Katsumura and Nishiyama play a local married couple of neighbors, Kashu and Igawa a local unmarried couple of neighbors, all of them willing to help Ruri in their own way.

== Cast ==
- Riko Narumi as Ruri
- Yutaka Takenouchi as Tatsuya/Makoto
- Ken Ogata as Nakama Yuzou
- Fumiyo Kohinata as Teruaki
- Naomi Nishida as Nao
- Taeko Yoshida as Granny Kamado
- Sansei Shiomi as Souhei
- Sei Hiraizumi as Harue
- Yoshie Ichige as Yoshie
- Sakura as Mihoko
- Mitsuko Baisho as Megumi
- Toshiki Kashu as Shigeru
- Haruka Igawa as Mitsuki
- Manami Konishi as Sanae
- Ittoku Kishibe as Manabu
- Masanobu Katsumura as Kouji
- Mayuko Nishiyama as Natsumi
- Anzu Nagai
- Shunji Igarashi

== Production credits ==
- Screenwriters: Morishita Keiko, Terada Toshio, Morishita Nao (森下直), Takeda Yuki (武田有起)
- Producers: Toda Kazuya (戸田一也), Kunimoto Masahiro, Tsugiya Hisashi (次屋尚)
- Directors: Inomata Ryuuichi (猪股隆一), Ikeda Kenji (池田健司)
- Music: Takefumi Haketa (羽毛田丈史)
- Viewership: 12.64%
