= Kita-Gōdo Station =

Railway station in Gōdo, Gifu Prefecture, Japan

Kita-Gōdo Station 北神戸駅
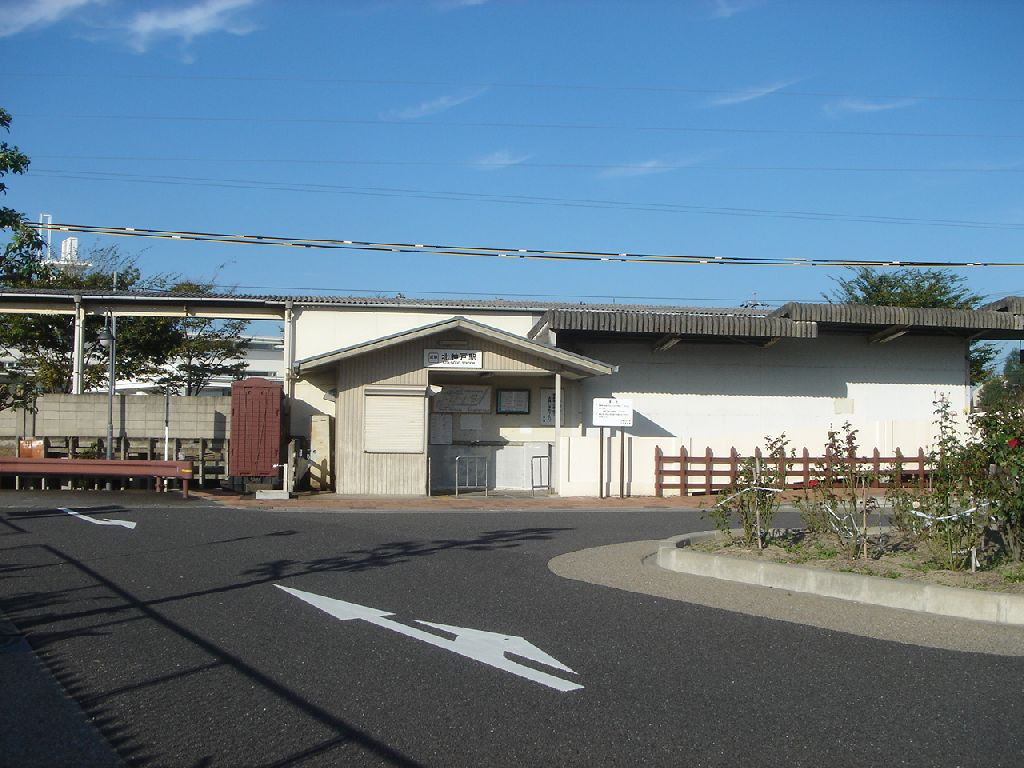
- Kita-Gōdo Station in January 2007

General information
- Location: Kita-Isshiki, Gōdo-chō, Anpachi-gun, Gifu-ken 503-2306; Japan
- Coordinates: 35.4300°N 136.5942°E
- Operator: Yōrō Railway
- Line: ■ Yōrō Line
- Distance: 51.9 km from Kuwana
- Platforms: 1 side platform
- Tracks: 1

Other information
- Status: Unstaffed
- Website: Official website (in Japanese)

History
- Opened: March 27, 1986

Passengers
- FY2015: 590
Location
- Location within Japan

Kita-Gōdo Station (北神戸駅, Kita-Gōdo-eki) is a railway station in the town of Gōdo, Anpachi District, Gifu Prefecture, Japan, operated by the private railway operator Yōrō Railway.

== Lines ==
Kita-Gōdo Station is a station on the Yōrō Line, and is located 51.9 rail kilometers from the opposing terminus of the line at Kuwana.

== Station layout ==
Kita-Gōdo Station has one ground-level side platform serving single bi-directional track. The station is unattended.

== Adjacent stations ==
| « | Service | » |
Yōrō Railway
Yōrō Line
| Hiro-Gōdo | - | Ikeno |

== History ==
Kita-Gōdo Station opened on March 27, 1986.

== Passenger statistics ==
In fiscal 2015, the station was used by an average of 590 passengers daily (boarding passengers only).

== Surrounding area ==
- Gōdo-chō Kita Elementary School

== See also ==
- List of railway stations in Japan
