= Haruka Igawa =

Japanese actress (born 1976)

- 井川 遥
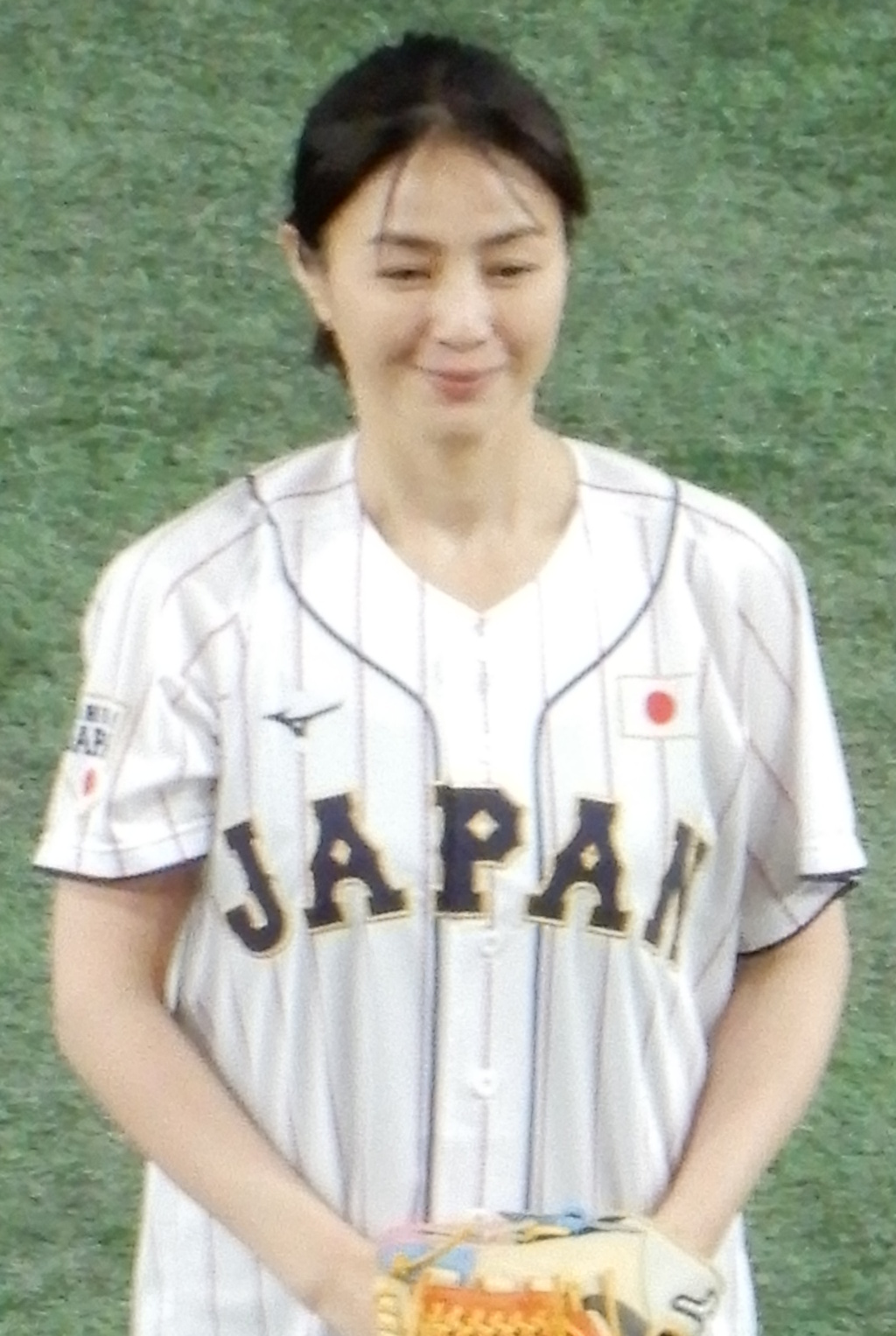
- Igawa in 2023
- Born: June 29, 1976 (age 50); Sumida, Tokyo, Japan
- Occupation: Actress
- Years active: 1999–present
- Height: 1.67 m (5 ft 5 1/2 in)
- Spouse: Atou Matsumoto (m. 2006)
- Children: 2
- Website: www.haruka-fan.net

Haruka Igawa (井川 遥(いがわ はるか), Igawa Haruka; born June 29, 1976) is a Japanese actress and a former gravure idol.

== Career ==
Igawa appeared in Kiyoshi Kurosawa's 2008 film Tokyo Sonata and Shinji Aoyama's 2011 film Tokyo Park.

== Personal life ==
On November 26, 2006, she announced through a press conference that she had married fashion designer Atou Matsumoto, who is 14 years older than her, on the 22nd of that month. She gave birth to her first child, a daughter, on June 28, 2009 and her second child, a son, in July 2012.

== Filmography ==
=== Film ===
- Filament (2001)
- Tokyo.sora (2001)
- Dog Star (2002)
- Mokka no Koibito (2002)
- Ki no Umi (2004)
- 69 (2004)
- Until the Lights Come Back (2005)
- Oh! Oku (2006)
- Waiting in the Dark (2006)
- Mizuchi (2006)
- Zo no Senaka (2007)
- The Investigation Game (2007)
- Ikigami (2008)
- Team Batista no Eiko (2008)
- Tokyo Sonata (2008)
- A Good Husband (2009)
- Dear Doctor (2009)
- Tokyo Park (2011)
- The Fish Tale (2022), Michiko
- Showtime 7 (2025), Sakura Itō
- A Moon in the Ordinary (2025), Yoko Sudo
- Brand New Landscape (2025)
- After the Quake (2025)
- Guilt (2026), Orie Asaba

=== Television ===
- Psycho Doctor (2002)
- Sora Kara Furu Ichioku no Hoshi (2002)
- Shiritsu Tantei Hama Mike (2002)
- Yo nimo Kimyo na Monogatari (2003)
- Kougen e Irasshai (2003)
- Boku no Mahou Tsukai (2003)
- Hikari to Tomo ni (2004)
- Kikutei Yaozen no Hitobito (2004)
- Ranpo R Hakuhatsu Ki (2004)
- Ryoma ga Yuku (2004)
- Ruri no Shima (2005)
- Busu no Hitomi ni Koishiteru (2006)
- Woman's Island (2006)
- Junjo Kirari (2006)
- Shinuka to Omotta (2007)
- Fūrin Kazan (2007), Ise
- Kodoku no Kake (2007)
- Tengoku no Soup (2008)
- Room of King (2008)
- Job Hopper Buy a House (2010)
- Sunao ni Narenakute (2010)
- Kurumi no Heya (2011)
- Good Life: Arigato Papa Sayonara (2011)
- Burning Flower (2015), Takasu Hisako
- The Sniffer (2016)
- Kizoku Tantei (2017)
- My High School Business (2017)
- Half Blue Sky (2018)
- Hanzawa Naoki (S2) (2020)
- Ochoyan (2020–21), Yuriko Takashiro
- Lost Man Found (2022), herself
- Worst to First: A Teen Baseball Miracle (2023), Mika Nagumo
- After the Quake (2025)

== Awards ==
Year	Award	Category	Nominated work(s)	Result	Ref.
2001	39th Golden Arrow Award	Graph Award		Won	
2002	40th Golden Arrow Award	Rookie of the Year		Won	
2026	35th Japan Film Professional Awards	Best Actress	Hiraba no Tsuki	Won	
