= Central Highland (Japan) =

Inland region on central Honshū, Japan

Coordinates: 35°59′N 137°41′E

The Central Highland (中央高地, Chūō Kōchi), or Koshin Region (甲信地方, Kōshin Chihō), is an inland region on central Honshū in Japan. It forms the central part of the Chūbu region.

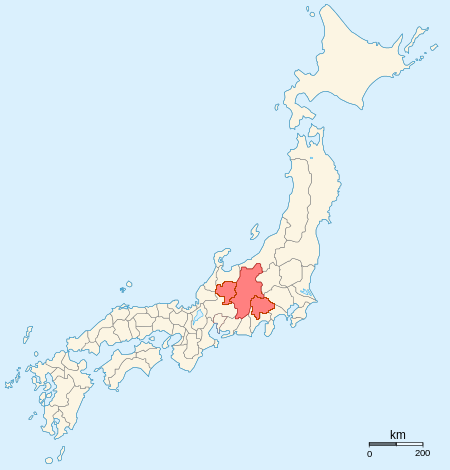
Kōshin Chihō (Central Highland of Chūbu)

It comprises most of Nagano and Yamanashi Prefectures, as well as the Hida area of Gifu Prefecture. Sometimes Tōnō area of Gifu Prefecture is included.

The humid continental climate of the region gives large temperature differences between summers and winters, and between days and nights. Precipitation is light throughout the year. The more northern and western portions of this region tend to experience heavy snow during the winter with lower daytime temperatures resembling parts of Northern Japan and Hokkaido more so than its neighbor prefectures.

In the Edo period, the Nakasendō and Kōshū Kaidō ran through the Central Highland.

== Geography ==
The region is known for its various mountains and geological features, and is most well known for Mount Fuji, the tallest mountain in Japan.

- Mountain Ranges: Akaishi Mountains, Hida Mountains, Kiso Mountains, Yatsugatake Mountains
- Mountains: Mount Fuji, Mount Tateshina, Mount Yari, Mount Hotakadake, Mount Yake, Mount Norikura, Mount Ontake, Mount Akaishi, Mount Shirouma, Mount Asama
- Basins: Kiso Valley, Kofu Basin, Suwa Basin, Matsumoto Basin, Ina Basin, Ueda Basin, Saku Basin, Nagano Basin
- Plateau: Kirigamine, Sugadaira Plateau
- Lakes: Lake Suwa, Lake Aoki, Lake Shirakaba
- Rivers : Fuefuki River, Fuji River, Tenryū River, Kiso River, Shinano River
- Onsen: Kamisuwa Onsen, Bessho Onsen

== Demographics ==
Per Japanese census data, and, Koshin subregion has had continuous negative population growth since year 2000

Historical population
Year	Pop.	±%
1920	2,286,000	—
1930	2,498,118	+9.3%
1940	2,546,187	+1.9%
1950	3,077,337	+20.9%
1960	2,948,536	−4.2%
1970	2,895,263	−1.8%
1980	3,063,784	+5.8%
1990	3,181,644	+3.8%
2000	3,273,037	+2.9%
2010	3,176,162	−3.0%
2020	3,015,034	−5.1%

== See also ==
- Kōshin'etsu region
