= Hiro-Gōdo Station =

Railway station in Gōdo, Gifu Prefecture, Japan

Hiro-Gōdo Station 広神戸駅
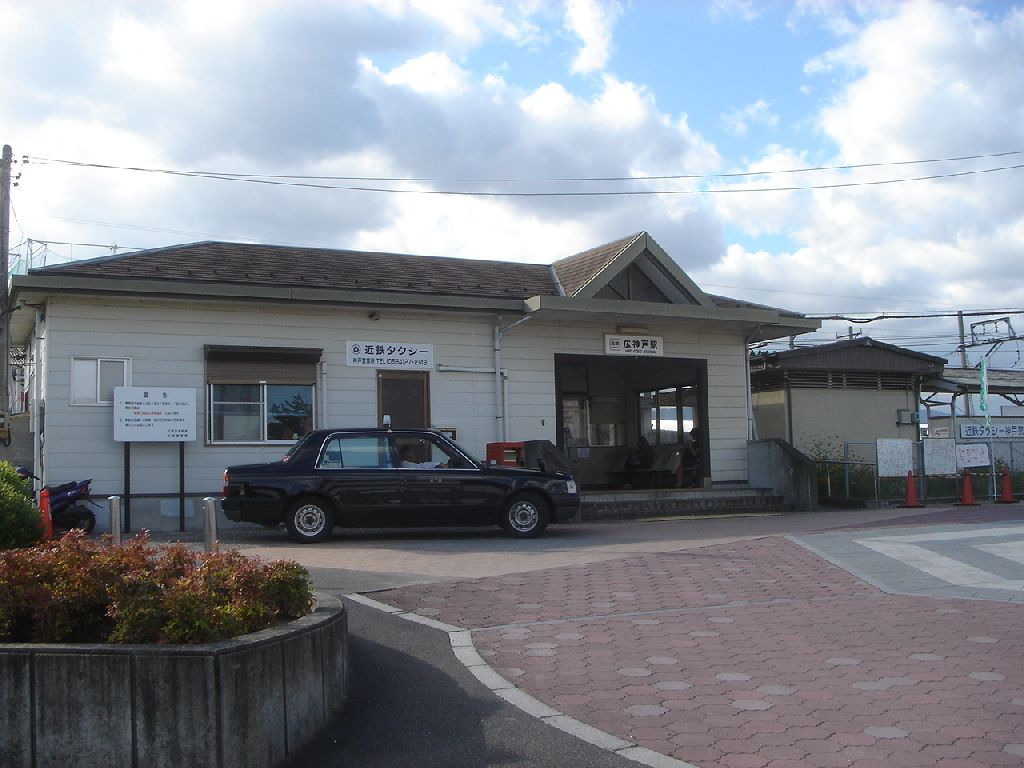
- Hiro-Gōdo Station in January 2007

General information
- Location: Gōdo, Gōdo-chō, Anpachi-gun, Gifu-ken 503-2305; Japan
- Coordinates: 35.4196°N 136.6020°E
- Operator: Yōrō Railway
- Line: ■ Yōrō Line
- Distance: 50.3 km from Kuwana
- Platforms: 1 side platform
- Tracks: 1

Other information
- Status: Unstaffed
- Website: Official website (in Japanese)

History
- Opened: July 31, 1913
- Former names: 933
Location
- Location within Japan

Hiro-Gōdo Station (広神戸駅, Hiro-Gōdo-eki) is a railway station in the town of Gōdo, Anpachi District, Gifu Prefecture Japan, operated by the private railway operator Yōrō Railway.

== Lines ==
Hiro-Gōdo Station is a station on the Yōrō Line, and is located 50.3 rail kilometers from the opposing terminus of the line at Kuwana.

== Station layout ==
Hiro-Gōdo Station has one ground-level side platform serving a single bi-directional track. The station is unattended.

== Adjacent stations ==
| « | Service | » |
Yōrō Railway
Yōrō Line
| Higashi-Akasaka | - | Kita-Gōdo |

== History ==
Hiro-Gōdo Station opened on July 31, 1913.

== Passenger statistics ==
In fiscal 2015, the station was used by an average of 933 passengers daily (boarding passengers only).

== Surrounding area ==
- Gōdo Junior High School

== See also ==
- List of railway stations in Japan
