= Nao Minamisawa =

Japanese actress (born 1990)

- 南沢 奈央
- Born: June 15, 1990 (age 35); Saitama Prefecture, Japan
- Occupation: Actress
- Years active: 2006–present
- Agent: Sweet Power
- Height: 164 cm (5 ft 5 in)
- Spouse: Yuki Adachi (m. 2026)
- Website: www.naosway.net

Nao Minamisawa (南沢 奈央, Minamisawa Nao; born June 15, 1990) is a Japanese actress. From 2012, she regularly appears in the ETV science program Science Zero.

== Biography ==
Minamisawa starred in Akai Ito. She appeared in Junji Sakamoto's 2010 film Strangers in the City. She is fluent in Korean.

On January 1, 2026, she announced her marriage to a tap dancer Yuki Adachi.

== Filmography ==
=== Film ===
- Walking My Life (2007)
- Akai Ito (2008)
- Yamazakura (2008)
- Shakariki! (2008)
- Kimi ni Love Song o (2010)
- Hachigatsu no Nijusou (2010)
- Strangers in the City (2010)
- Mameshiba Ichiro: Futen no Shiba Jiro (2013)

=== Television ===
- Seito Shokun! (2007)
- Shiori to Shimiko no Kaiki Jikenbo (2008)
- Akai Ito (2008)
- 1 Pound no Fukuin (2008)
- Kamiji Yusuke Monogatari (2009)
- Dandy Daddy (2009)
- Maigo (2011)
- Koukou Nyushi (2012)
- Suteki na Sen TAXI (2014)
- Gunshi Kanbei (2014)
- Kōnodori (2015)
- Jimi ni Sugoi! Kōetsu Girl: Kouno Etsuko (2016)

== Bibliography ==
- Minamisawa no Kaze (2007)
- Futsu (2009)

== Discography ==
- Ima (2012)
