= Hida (region) =

Region in Gifu, Japan

Hida region (brown-yellow) in Gifu Prefecture

Hida (飛騨) is the northern portion of Gifu Prefecture in the Chūbu region of Japan. The Hida region received its name because the area was formerly part of Hida Province, before the formation of prefectures in Japan. The borders of this region are not officially set, but it generally consists of the following four municipalities: Takayama, Hida, Gero and Shirakawa.

== Climate ==
The Hida region has a humid continental climate, with very warm summers and long, cold, very snowy winters. Some of the highest levels of snowfall in Japan are found in the north-western fringes of this region annually amounting to in excess of 10 meters, for example Shirakawa.

Climate data for Shirakawa, Japan (1983–2010)
Month	Jan	Feb	Mar	Apr	May	Jun	Jul	Aug	Sep	Oct	Nov	Dec	Year
Mean daily maximum °C (°F)	2.9 (37.2)	3.5 (38.3)	7.8 (46.0)	15.6 (60.1)	21.4 (70.5)	24.7 (76.5)	27.9 (82.2)	29.6 (85.3)	24.8 (76.6)	18.9 (66.0)	12.7 (54.9)	6.0 (42.8)	16.3 (61.3)
Mean daily minimum °C (°F)	−4.7 (23.5)	−5.2 (22.6)	−2.5 (27.5)	2.7 (36.9)	8.3 (46.9)	13.8 (56.8)	18.1 (64.6)	19.0 (66.2)	15.0 (59.0)	8.2 (46.8)	2.3 (36.1)	−2.0 (28.4)	6.1 (43.0)
Average snowfall cm (inches)	356 (140)	271 (107)	162 (64)	23 (9.1)	1 (0.4)	0 (0)	0 (0)	0 (0)	0 (0)	0 (0)	23 (9.1)	212 (83)	1,055 (415)
Mean monthly sunshine hours	54.7	76.2	116.0	163.3	177.8	145.6	148.3	171.6	118.0	112.9	83.4	61.6	1,426.7
Source: Japan Meteorological Agency

== Demographics ==
Per Japanese census data, Hida part of Gifu prefecture has experienced a population decline since 1950.

Hida was the largest city in Hida area until 1950 when it was surpassed by Takayama. The population peak of Hida area was around 200,000 in 1950.

Historical population
Year	Pop.	±%
1950	200,000	—
1970	176,346	−11.8%
1980	175,850	−0.3%
1990	172,017	−2.2%
2000	169,697	−1.3%
2010	160,638	−5.3%
2020	145,349	−9.5%

== See also ==
- Seinō
- Gifu
- Chūnō
- Tōnō
