= Gōdo =

Gōdo 神戸町
- Town
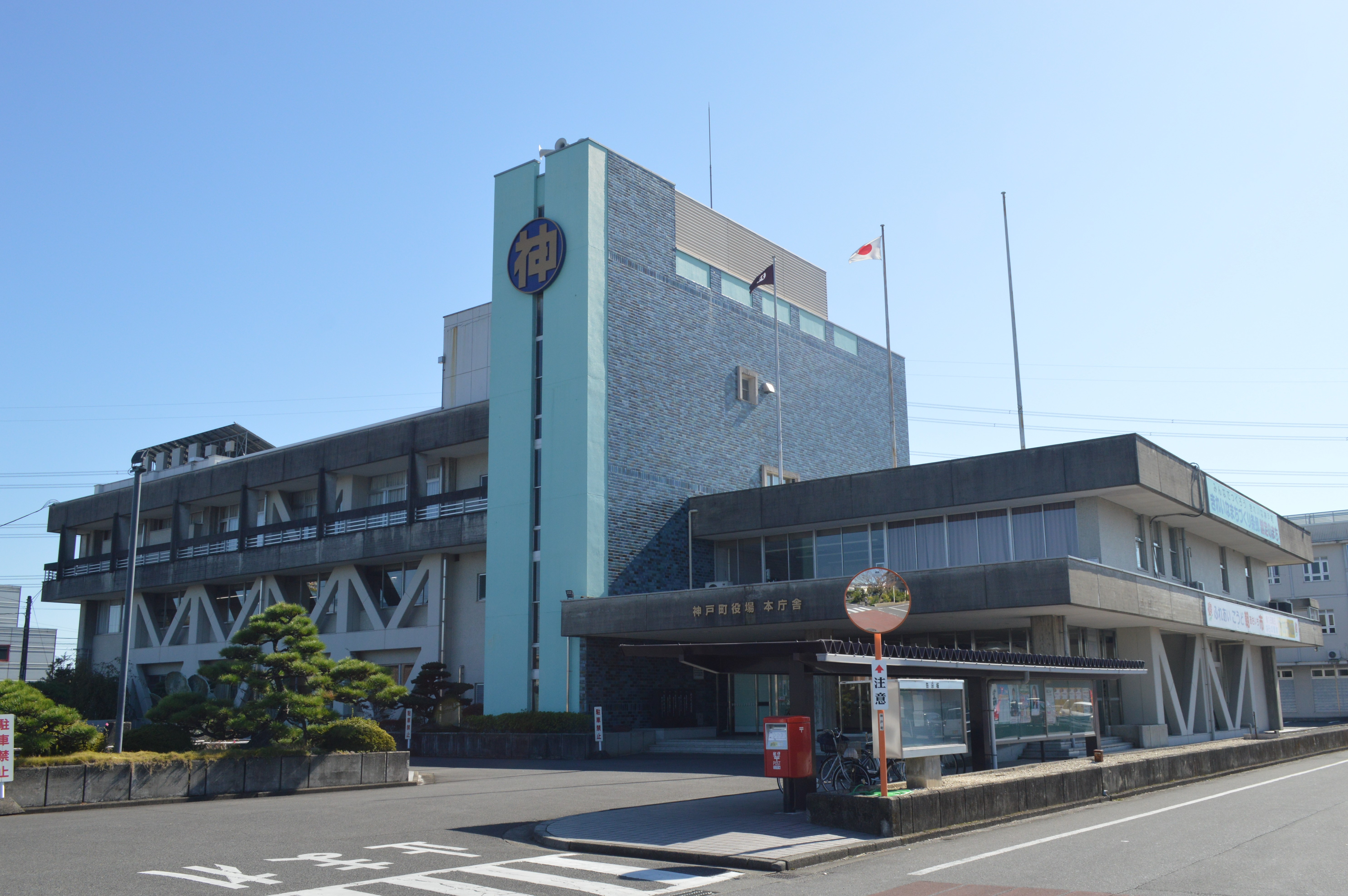
- Gōdo Town Hall

- Flag Seal

- Location of Gōdo in Gifu Prefecture

- Coordinates: 35°25′2.5″N 136°37′30.7″E
- Country: Japan
- Region: Chūbu
- Prefecture: Gifu
- District: Anpachi

Area
  - Total: 18.78 km^{2} (7.25 sq mi)

Population (December 1, 2016)
  - Total: 19,361
  - Density: 1,031/km^{2} (2,670/sq mi)
- Time zone: UTC+9 (Japan Standard Time)
- City symbols
- Tree: Ilex integra
- Flower: Rose
- Phone number: 0584-27-3111
- Address: Ōaza Gōdo 1111, Gōdo-chō, Anpachi-gun, Gifu-ken 503-2392
- Website: Official website

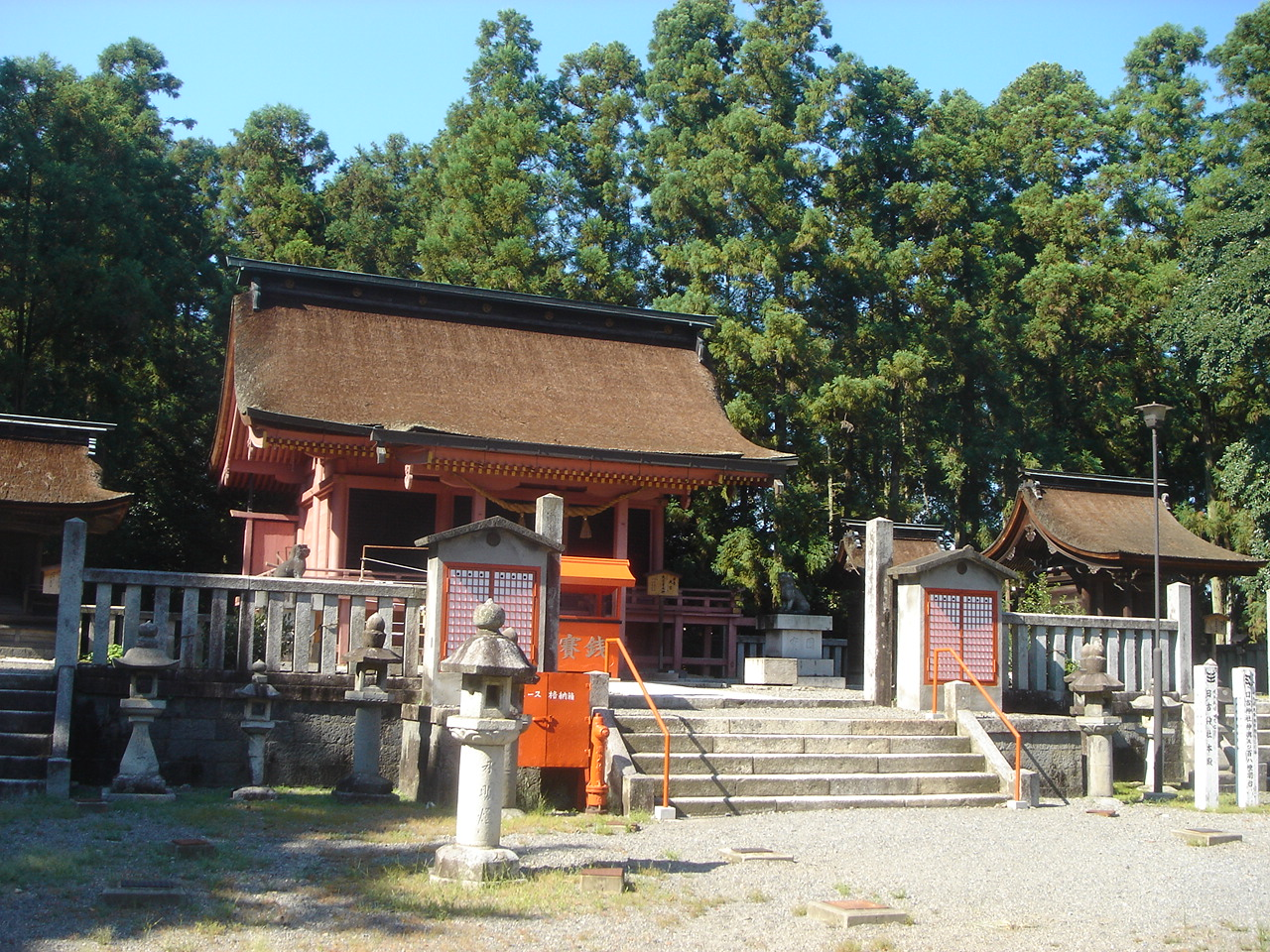
Hiyoshi Shrine in Gōdo

Gōdo (神戸町, Gōdo-chō) is a town located in Gifu, Japan. As of 1 December 2018, the town had an estimated population of 19,361 and a population density of 1000 persons per km^{2}, in 6998 households. The total area of the town was 18.78 square kilometres (7.25 sq mi).

== Geography ==
Gōdo is located in the northwestern portion of the Nōbi Plain in southwestern Gifu Prefecture. The town has a climate characterized by characterized by hot and humid summers, and mild winters (Köppen climate classification Cfa). The average annual temperature in Gōdo is 15.2 °C. The average annual rainfall is 1952 mm with September as the wettest month. The temperatures are highest on average in August, at around 27.6 °C, and lowest in January, at around 3.9 °C.

=== Neighbouring municipalities ===
- Gifu Prefecture
  - Ikeda
  - Mizuho
  - Ōgaki
  - Ōno

== Demographics ==
Per Japanese census data, the population of Gōdo peaked around the year 2000 and has declined slightly since.

Historical population
Year	Pop.	±%
1970	13,615	—
1980	19,338	+42.0%
1990	20,704	+7.1%
2000	20,750	+0.2%
2010	20,065	−3.3%
2020	18,585	−7.4%

== History ==
The area around Gōdo was part of traditional Mino Province, and was the location of a shōen controlled by Enryaku-ji during the Heian and Kamakura periods, During the Edo period, it was mostly controlled by Ōgaki Domain. During the post-Meiji restoration cadastral reforms, the area was organised into Anpachi District, Gifu, and the village of Gōdo was established with the creation of the modern municipalities system on April 1, 1889. Gōdo was raised to town status on August 5, 1892. The town annexed the village of Kita-Hirano on April 1, 1950, and the villages of Shimomiya and Minami-Hirano on April 1, 1954. The town borders expanded on April 1, 1960, by the annexation of the Nishizakura section of the neighboring town Ōno. In 2004, a proposed merger with the neighboring city of Ōgaki was rejected by a referendum.

== Economy ==
The mainstay of the local economy is agriculture (rice, vegetables, dairy, poultry), and light industry (computer related products, dairy products, chemicals).

== Education ==
Gōdo has four public elementary schools and two public middle schools operated by the town government. The town does not have a high school.

== Transportation ==
=== Railway ===
- Yōrō Railway Yōrō Line
  - Higashi-Akasaka - Hiro-Gōdo - Kita-Gōdo

=== Highway ===
The town is not served by any national highways.
