= Sogi Park =

Park in Toki, Japan

- 曽木公園
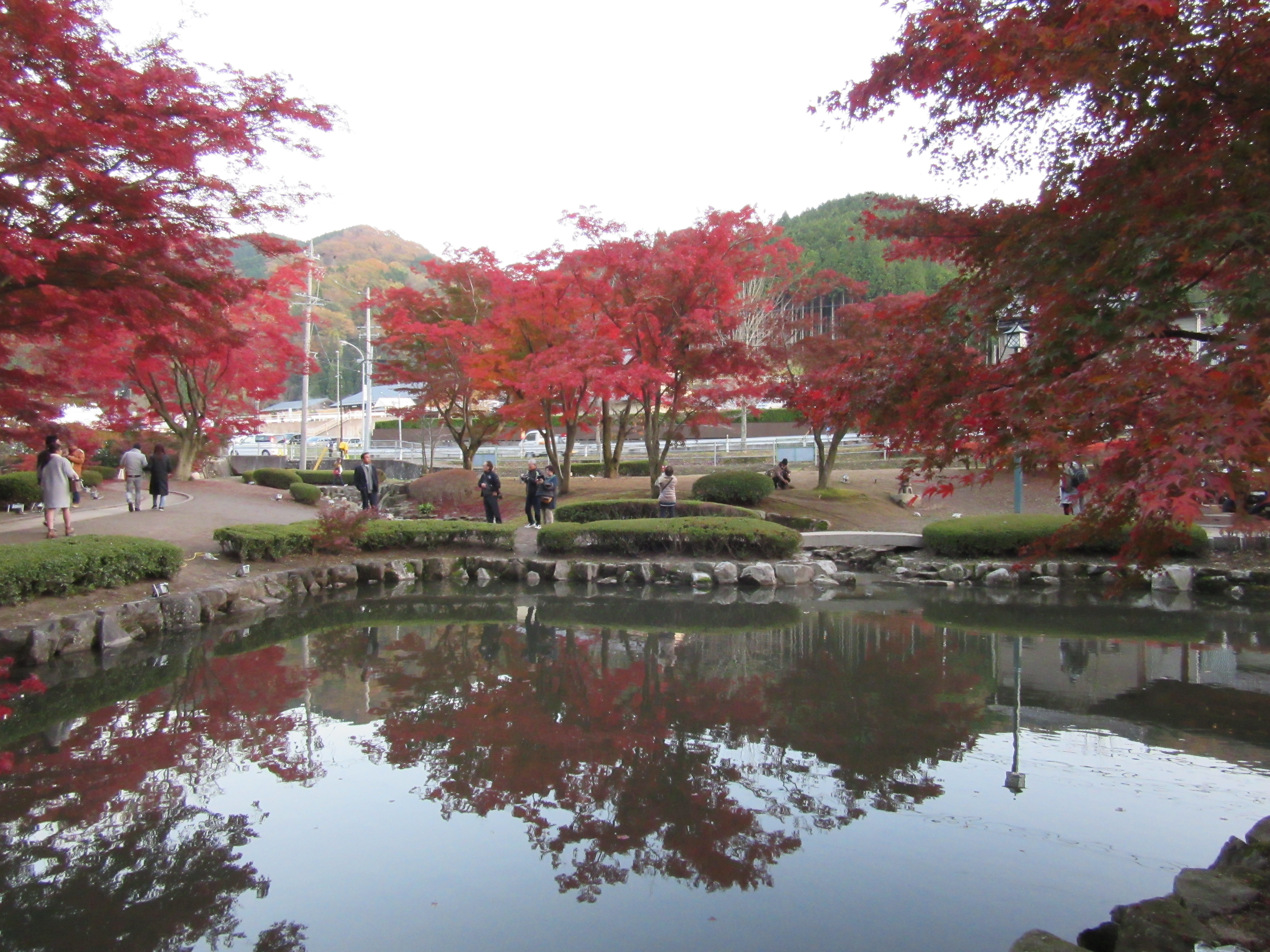
- Autumn colors at Sogi Park

- Location within Gifu Prefecture
- Location: Toki, Gifu, Japan
- Coordinates: 35°17′46.2″N 137°15′47.0″E
- Area: 16,300 square metres (4.0 acres)
- Open: All year
- Plants: 300
- Public transit: Toki Community Bus Baden Park SOGI

Sogi Park (Japanese: 曽木公園, Hepburn: Sogi kōen) is a park located in Toki, Gifu Prefecture, Japan.

Sogi Onsen (Baden Park SOGI) is adjacent.

== Overview ==
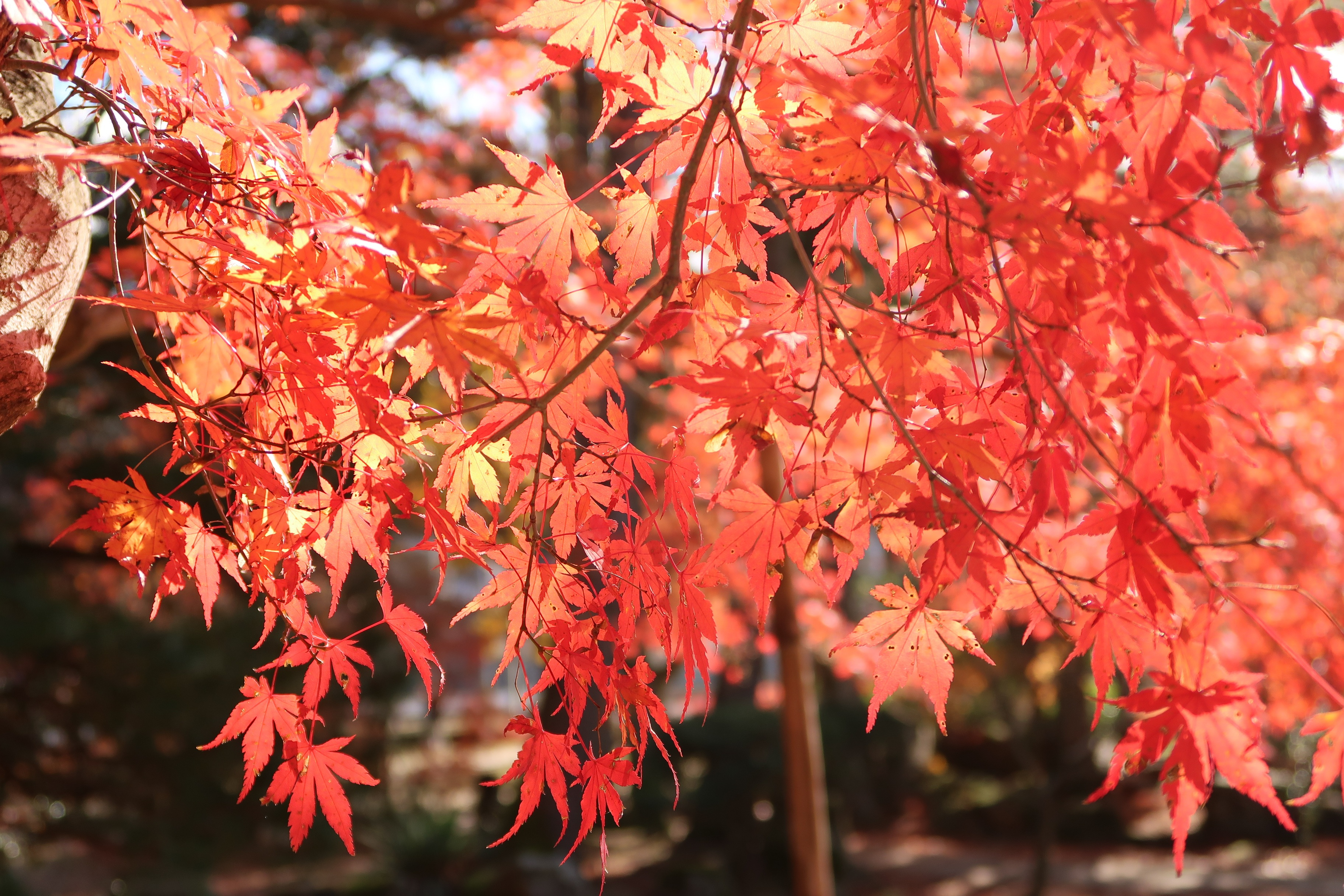
Japanese maple leaves at Sogi Park in fall

- In the park there are around 300 trees including Japanese maple, maple, ginkgo biloba, Japanese hemlock, and giant dogwood, as well as variously sized ponds.
- In fall, the foliage of the trees and shrubs is reflected in the ponds, and one can see "inverted fall foliage". This inverted fall foliage has been lit up at night every year since 1999.
- As a famous spot for fall foliage, it was selected to be in "33 Spots for Fall Foliage in Hida and Mino" in 2004, and the "100 Famous Places for Fall Foliage in Japan" in 2010.
- This park is close to the border with Aichi Prefecture. If one continues on Gifu Prefectural Route 111 towards Aichi for about 2 kilometers, they will enter the city of Toyota (formerly Obara).

== Access ==
- Located about 15 kilometers from Toki IC on the Chūō Expressway. After getting off, go to Route 363 via Gifu Prefectural Route 19 or Route 69.
- Located about 16 kilometers from Seto-Shinano IC on the Tōkai-Kanjō Expressway via Route 363.
- Get off at the Baden Park SOGI bus stop on the Toki Community Bus Toki Nanboku Line on weekdays, or the Donburi Kaikan Baden Park Line on weekends.
  - In the fall foliage season there may also be a temporary bus that runs from Tokishi Station.
