= Gifu (region) =

Region of Gifu Prefecture, Japan

Gifu region (green) in Gifu Prefecture

Gifu (岐阜) is the southcentral portion of Gifu Prefecture in the Chūbu region of Japan. It shares its name with the prefecture and the capital city of Gifu. The borders of this region are not officially set, but it generally consists of the following cities and towns: Gifu, Kakamigahara, Hashima, Mizuho, Motosu, Yamagata, Kasamatsu, Ginan and Kitagata.

== Geography ==
The northern part of the region is separated from Fukui Prefecture by tall mountain ranges. To the west, the Gifu region is separated from the Seinō region by the Nagara and Ibi rivers. To the south, the region is separated from Aichi Prefecture by the Kiso River. It is separated from the Chūnō region to the east by mountains that are only about 300 m (984 ft) in height.

Approximately 45% of the region is less than 100 m (328 ft) above sea level. The lowest point is around Hashima, which is only 5 m (16 ft). Heading north, it climbs to 14 m (46 ft) above sea level around Gifu City Hall and 175 m (574 ft) in the Neo area of Motosu.

During the winter, the areas around Yamagata and Motosu receive heavy snowfall. Also, the Ibuki oroshi winds blow across the region from the west.

== Population ==
The Gifu region has a population of around 900,000 people, over 40% of the population of the whole prefecture. Approximately half of those people live in the capital city of Gifu.

== Industries ==
The area around the main city of Gifu used to be well known as a center for the apparel industry, though it has been in decline for many years.

Kakamigahara is home to aerospace engineering facilities run by Kawasaki Heavy Industries. The city is also known for its production of carrots.

Motosu, Hozumi and the surrounding areas are heavily involved in the production of persimmons, specifically the Fuyu (富有 fuyū) variety.

== See also ==
- Seinō
- Chūnō
- Tōnō
- Hida
