= Half Blue Sky =

Japanese television drama series

- Also known as: Half Blue
- Original title: 半分、青い。
- Genre: Drama
- Written by: Eriko Kitagawa
- Directed by: Kenji Tanaka; Yōhei Doi; Shin'ichirō Hashizume
- Starring: Mei Nagano; Yasuko Matsuyuki; Kenichi Takitō; Takeru Satō; Tomoyo Harada; Shōsuke Tanihara; Nana Seino; Jun Shison; Haruka Igawa; Etsushi Toyokawa; Masatoshi Nakamura
- Narrated by: Jun Fubuki
- Opening theme: "Idea" by Gen Hoshino
- Composer: Yugo Kanno
- Country of origin: Japan
- Original language: Japanese
- No. of episodes: 156

Production
- Executive producer: Natsuko Katsuta
- Running time: 15 minutes

Original release
- Network: NHK
- Release: April 2 – September 29, 2018

Half Blue Sky (Japanese: 半分、青い, Hepburn: Hanbun, Aoi) is a 2018 Japanese television drama series and the 98th Asadora series, following Warotenka. It premiered on April 2, 2018, and concluded on September 29, 2018. Mei Nagano was cast in the lead role of Suzume Nireno after an audition of 2366 women.

== Plot ==
Suzume Nireno and Ritsu Hagio were born on the same day in 1971 in a small town in Gifu Prefecture. They grow up as close friends, with Suzume encouraging the smart but shy Ritsu, and Ritsu protecting Suzume, who lost hearing in one ear due to an illness. They are still close in high school, but their first romantic interests are directed at other people: for Ritsu, a beautiful girl in the archery club of another school; for Suzume, a kind boy also from another school. Nothing much comes of either as they and their friends have to think of life after high school. Suzume plans to work but is only able to get a job at the local farmer's coop thanks to her grandfather's connections. Ritsu, however, has been lending her the shojo manga of Haori Akikaze, which inspire Suzume to draw her own manga.

When she meets Akikaze in person—who turns out to be a man—and shows him her work, he suddenly asks her to come work for him. She has to battle with her mother to let her go to Tokyo, but when she begins working for Akikaze, she finds out the main reason he hired her was for the rice treats her grandfather made. She convinces him to give her a test to earn her place as an apprentice. Meanwhile, Ritsu too is in Tokyo attending college and has made friends with Masato. Akikaze fires Suzume when he thinks she has thrown out an important draft of a manga, but when he discovers he just misplaced it, he travels to Gifu to bring her back and finally begin her real training as a manga artist. Around then, Ritsu re-encounters Saya, the archery girl, and the two begin dating. Suzume also begins to fall in love with Masato, but he rejects her, thinking she really belongs with Ritsu. But with Saya having grown jealous of Suzume, Ritsu decides to end all contact with Suzume.

The two rejections are a double whammy for Suzume, but Akikaze encourages her to express her feelings in creating manga. She, Yūko, and Makoto—Akikaze's apprentices—compete for a famous newcomer award, which Makoto wins, but has to withdraw after he earns Akikaze's ire for publishing another manga in a disreputable magazine. The award then goes to Suzume, who along with Yūko, gets to draw her first serialized manga. After several years, Yūko is the first to hit the brick wall and can't think of a new manga and ends up quitting. Suzume visits Gifu for the first time in a while and runs into Ritsu, who has broken up with Saya. He suddenly asks her to marry him, but she says it is impossible. She meant it was impossible at that time, but he took it differently. Soon afterwards Suzume's serialization also ends, but she gets additional bad news when she learns Ritsu has gotten married.

Always weak in storytelling, Suzume also fails to think of a new manga and quits. It's 1999 and she is 28 years old, so with no other prospects, she ends up working at a dollar store. There she meets Ryoji, the nephew of the three women who own the store. He's a budding filmmaker, working for the often-out-of-work director named Shohei Motosumiyoshi. Ryoji soon falls in love with Suzume. They decide to get married, and when Ryoji writes a screenplay based on a popular novel, he thinks this his chance to debut as a director, but Motosumiyoshi takes the job. Ryoji gives up on becoming a director and devotes himself to Suzume and their daughter Kano. A few years later, however, he catches the filmmaking bug again and, against Suzume's protests, leaves her and his daughter to pursue his career. Suzume returns to Gifu to find out that her younger brother Shota had revived the family restaurant with a new menu.

She also meets Ritsu again, who is in town looking after his sick mother Wako. Suzume decides to start a food stand selling goheimochi, learning the secret recipe from her grandfather Senkichi before he dies. She also helps Ritsu when Wako dies and even helps him mend ways with his wife, even though she still loves him. Learning of a place in Tokyo that lets you market your ideas on a small scale, and believing Kano has potential as an ice skater, Suzume decides to return to Tokyo. Things do not go well, however, as the company she works for goes under and her product ideas seem to go nowhere. But she does run into not only Masato, but also Ritsu, who has gotten divorced.

Teaming up with Ritsu, who quits his job, Suzume develops the idea of creating a fan that creates what feels like a natural, not artificial breeze. Ryoji reappears and helps them by making a promotional video, but Suzume rejects his proposal to reunite. After many experiments, Suzume and Ritsu finally succeed in creating a natural fan, but on the day they present it to investors, the Tōhoku earthquake happens. Suzume is shocked to hear that her friend Yūko died in the disaster, but she is determined to keep going, this time with Ritsu as her partner in life.

== Cast ==
=== Nireno Family ===
- Mei Nagano as Suzume Nireno
  - Yusa Yazaki as childhood Suzume
- Yasuko Matsuyuki as Haru Nireno, Suzume's mother
- Kenichi Takitō as Utaro Nireno, Suzume's father
- Jun Fubuki as Renko Nireno, Suzume's grandmother/narrator
- Masatoshi Nakamura as Senkichi Nireno, Suzume's grandfather
- Kaisei Kamimura as Sōta Nireno, Suzume's brother
- Ririna Yamazaki as Kano "Kan-chan" Nireno, Suzume's daughter

=== Hagio Family ===
- Takeru Satō as Ritsu Hagio, Suzume's childhood friend
  - Kaito Takamura as childhood Ritsu
- Tomoyo Harada as Wako Hagio, Ritsu's mother
- Shōsuke Tanihara as Yaichi Hagio, Ritsu's father
- Shizuka Ishibashi as Yoriko Hagio, Ritsu's wife
- Ruito Yamashiro as Tsubasa Hagio, Ritsu's son

=== Saionji Family ===
- Yuma Yamoto as Ryunosuke Saionji, Suzume's classmate
  - Haruyoshi Ōtake as childhood Ryunosuke
- Seiji Rokkaku as Mitsuru Saionji, Ryunosuke's father
- Yuriko Hirooka as Tomiko Saionji, Ryunosuke's mother
- Maho Yamada as Reiko Sainoji, Ryunosuke's sister
  - Hinako Kouta as childhood Reiko

=== Kidahara Family ===
- Nao as Nao Kidahara, Suzume's classmate
  - Aina Nishizawa as childhood Nao
- Wataru Takagi as Gorō Kidahara, Nao's father
- Nobue Iketani as Sachiko Kidahara, Nao's mother

=== Office Tinkerbell ===
- Etsushi Toyokawa as Haori Akikaze, Suzume's manga teacher
- Haruka Igawa as Wakana Hishimoto, Akikaze's manager
- Nana Seino as Yūko Komiya, Akikaze's assistant
- Jun Shison as Makoto Tōdo, Akikaze's assistant

=== Others ===
- Kimiko Yo as Kimika Okada, the town doctor
- Tomoya Nakamura as Masato Asai, Ritsu's college classmate
- Seika Furuhata as Saya Itō
- Eriko Satō as Hitomi Ogura
- Nobuyuki Suzuki as Tōru Kanzaki
- Shotaro Mamiya as Ryoji Moriyama, Suzume's former husband
- Kyūsaku Shimada as Ichiro Tanabe
- Takumi Saito as Shōhei Motosumiyoshi
- Midoriko Kimura as Mitsue Fujimura
- Yumi Asō as Mugi Fujimura
- Risa Sudō as Meari Fujimura
- Kōichi Yamadera as a doctor
- Shin'ya Tsukamoto as Prof. Usakawa
- Mayumi Wakamura as Yumiko Sano
- Teppei Arita as Masahiko Tsumagari
- Towa Araki as Shujiro Tsumagari
- Manami Konishi as Keiko Kato
- Daisuke Ono as the voice of Kagami yo Kagami
- Yuta Koseki as Kento

Preceded by Warotenka	Asadora; April 2, 2018 – September 29, 2018	Succeeded by Manpuku
