= Chūnō =

Region of Gifu Prefecture, Japan

Chūnō region (blue) in Gifu Prefecture

Chūnō (中濃) is the central portion of Gifu Prefecture in the Chūbu region of Japan. Before Gifu became a prefecture, the area was part of Mino Province. The Chūnō region received its name as a combination of the kanji for "middle" (中) and "Mino" (美濃). The borders of this region are not officially set, but it generally consists of thirteen municipalities. There are five cities (Seki, Mino, Minokamo, Kani and Gujō) in addition to the towns and village in the Kamo (Sakahogi, Tomika, Kawabe, Hichisō, Yaotsu and Higashishirakawa) and Kani (Mitake) districts also fall into the Chūnō region. Occasionally, Gujō is separated from the Chūnō region and is said to be part of the Hokunō (北濃 Northern Mino) region.

== Geography ==
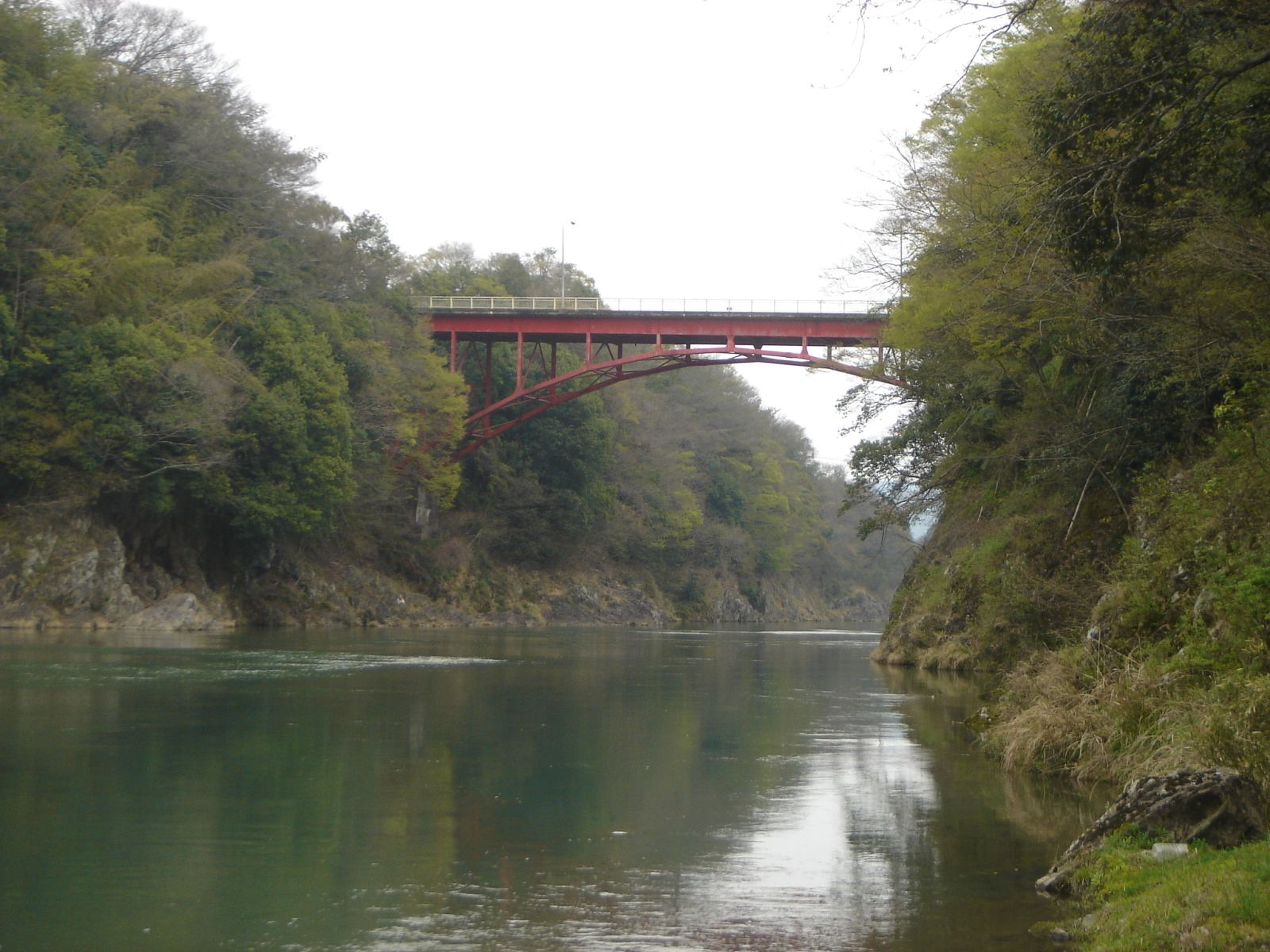
The Kiso River flowing beneath the Shimowatari Bridge in Kani

The geography of the region varies greatly, as the southern portion is filled with vast plains as part of the Nōbi Plain, whereas the north is a mountainous area.

The major rivers flowing through the area include the Nagara and Kiso rivers, both part of the Kiso Three Rivers, and the Hida River.

== Population ==
The total population of the region is approximately 400,000 people, with Seki and Kani each having about 100,000 residents.

== Industries ==
A large industry in the southern part of the region is agriculture. Minokamo's main produce are pears, grapes and persimmons. Seki grows kiwifruits. The northern, mountainous area has a strong forestry industry.

The region also has a handful of traditional crafts. Seki is known for its swordmaking, having been the center of swordmaking in Japan for many centuries. Mino is the home of Mino washi, a type of paper known for its strength. Gujō is known for its textiles.

== See also ==
- Seinō
- Gifu
- Tōnō
- Hida
