= Mie Prefectural Assembly =

Parliament of Mie, Japan

Mie Prefectural Assembly 三重県議会 Mie Kengikai

Type
- Type: Unicameral

History
- Founded: 1878 (first elected and convened in 1879)

Leadership
- President (gichō): Norikazu Yamamoto, Liberal Democratic Party
- Vice President (fuku-gichō): Hiroyuki Funahashi, Democratic Party (Japan, 2016)
- Seats: 51 assembly members

Elections
- Voting system: Single non-transferable vote
- Last election: 2011

Meeting place
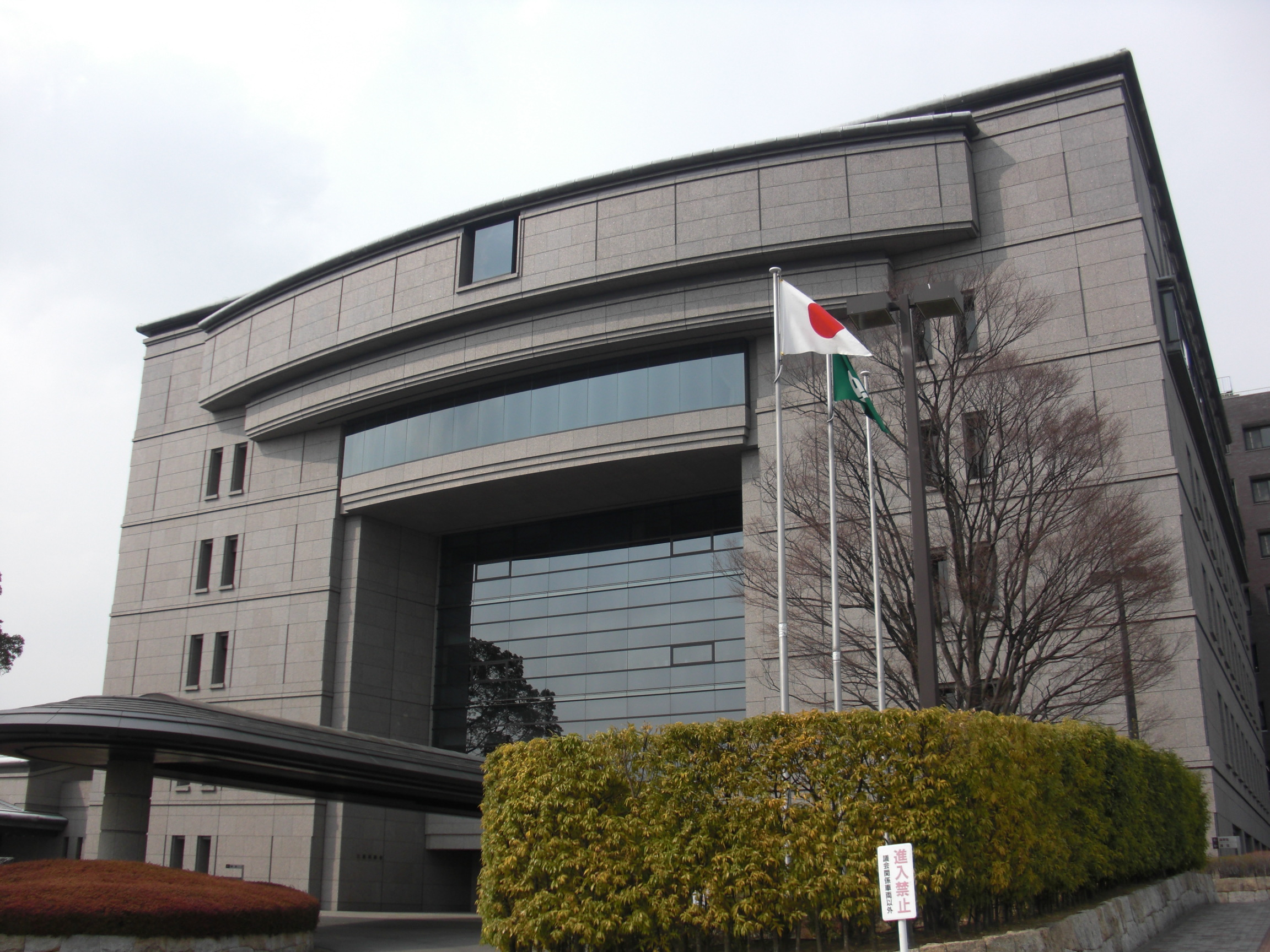

Website
- http://www.pref.mie.lg.jp/KENGIKAI/

The Mie Prefectural Assembly (三重県議会, Mie-kengikai) is the prefectural parliament of Mie.

Its 51 members are elected every four years in 17 districts by single non-transferable vote (SNTV). 15 electoral districts are multi-member districts, two are single-member district where SNTV becomes equivalent to First-past-the-post voting.

The assembly is responsible for enacting and amending prefectural ordinances, approving the budget and voting on important administrative appointments made by the governor including the vice-governors.

== Current composition ==
The last elections were held in the unified local elections in April 2011, at the same time when centre-right (LDP, Kōmeitō, YP) supported Eikei Suzuki narrowly beat DPJ-supported Naohisa Matsuda in the Mie gubernatorial election. In the assembly election, the Liberal Democratic Party remained strongest party, but the Democratic-Social Democratic group Shinsei Mie ("Renewal Mie") emerged as strongest force. The Japanese Communist Party lost all its seats in 2011.

As of April 30, 2011, the assembly was composed as follows:

Composition of the Mie Prefectural Assembly
Parliamentary group	Seats
Shinsei Mie ("Renewal Mie" of Democrats, Social Democrats and independents)	24
Jimin Mirai ("LibDem Future" of Liberal Democrats and independents)	21
Yōzan (a group of conservative independents – according to a member, the group name is derived from Uesugi Yōzan)	3
Kōmeitō	2
Minna no Tō (Your Party)	1
Total (including vacant seats)	51

== Electoral districts ==
As in all prefectures, most electoral districts correspond to current cities and former counties (while the counties were abolished as administrative unit in 1921, cities and counties had initially by definition served as electoral districts for prefectural assemblies in the Empire).

Electoral districts
District	Municipalities	Magnitude
Tsu City	Tsu City	7
Yokkaichi City	Yokkaichi City	7
Ise City	Ise City	4
Matsusaka City	Matsusaka City	4
Kuwana City/Kuwana County	Kuwana City; Kisosaki Town	4
Suzuka City	Suzuka City	4
Nabari City	Nabari City	2
Owase City/Kita-Muro (North Muro) County	Owase City; Kihoku Town	2
Kameyama City	Kameyama City	1
Toba City	Toba City	1
Kumano City/Minami-Muro (South Muro) County	Kumano City; Mihama Town; Kihō Town	2
Inabe City/Inabe County	Inabe City; Tōin Town	2
Shima City	Shima City	2
Iga City	Iga City	3
Mie County	Komono Town; Asahi Town; Kawagoe Town	2
Taki County	Taki Town; Meiwa Town; Ōdai Town	2
Watarai County	Tamaki Town; Watarai Town; Taiki Town; Minamiise Town	2
