= List of cities in Mie Prefecture by population =

The following list sorts all cities (including towns and villages) in the Japanese prefecture of Mie with a population of more than 5,000 according to the 2015 Census. As of October 1, 2015, 27 places fulfill this criterion and are listed here. This list refers only to the population of individual cities, towns and villages within their defined limits, which does not include other municipalities or suburban areas within urban agglomerations.

== List ==
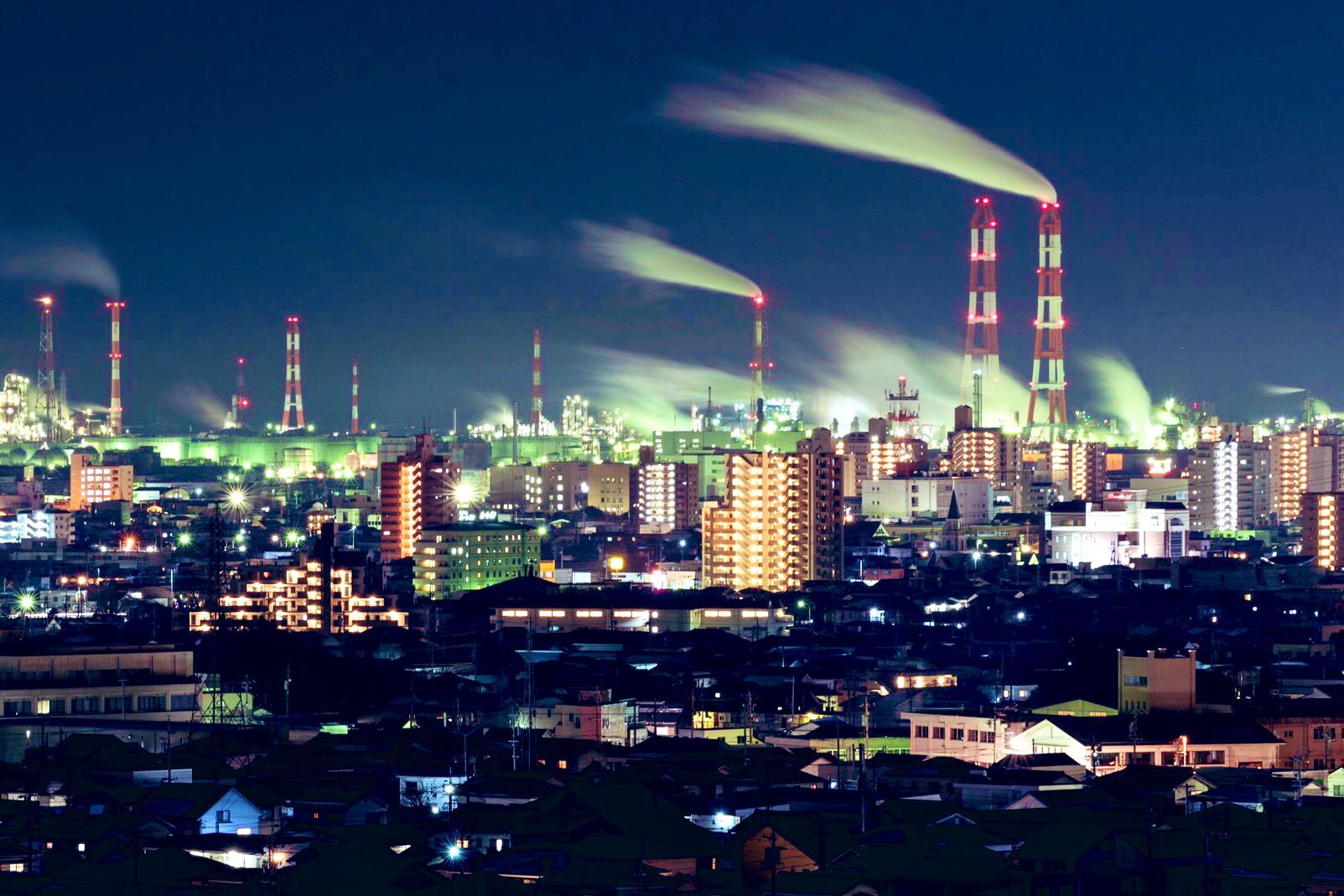
01.Yokkaichi

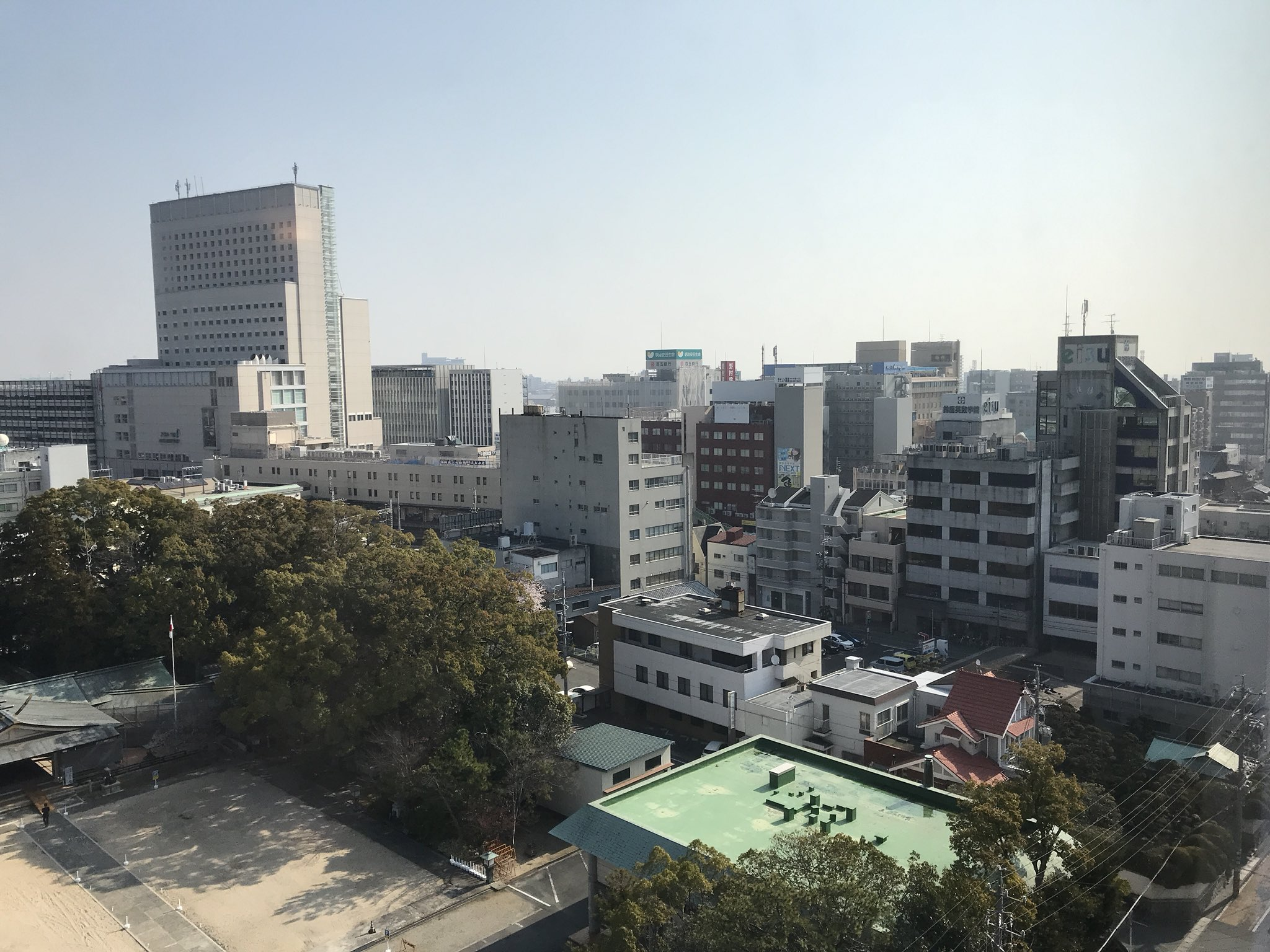
02.Tsu

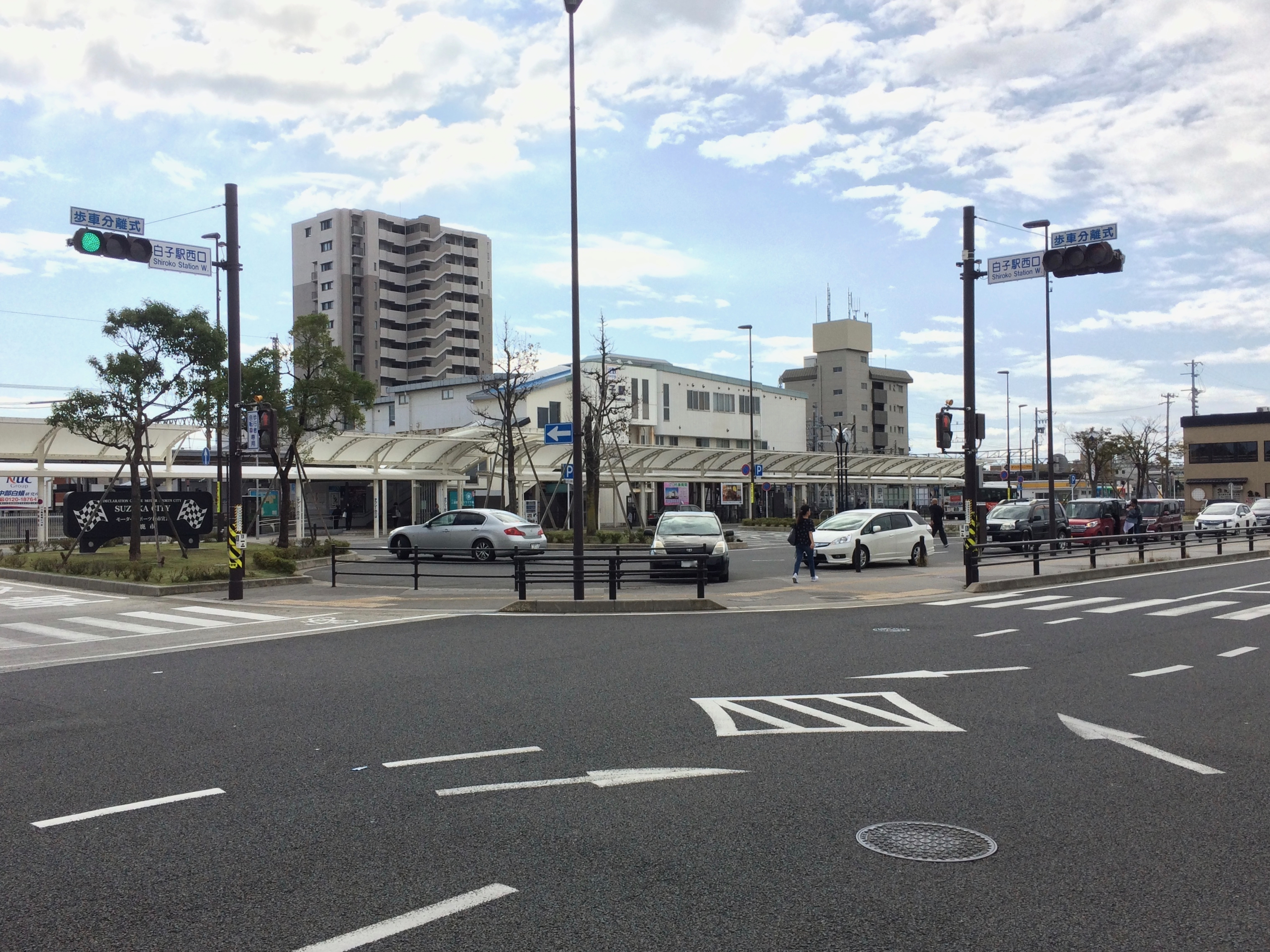
03.Suzuka

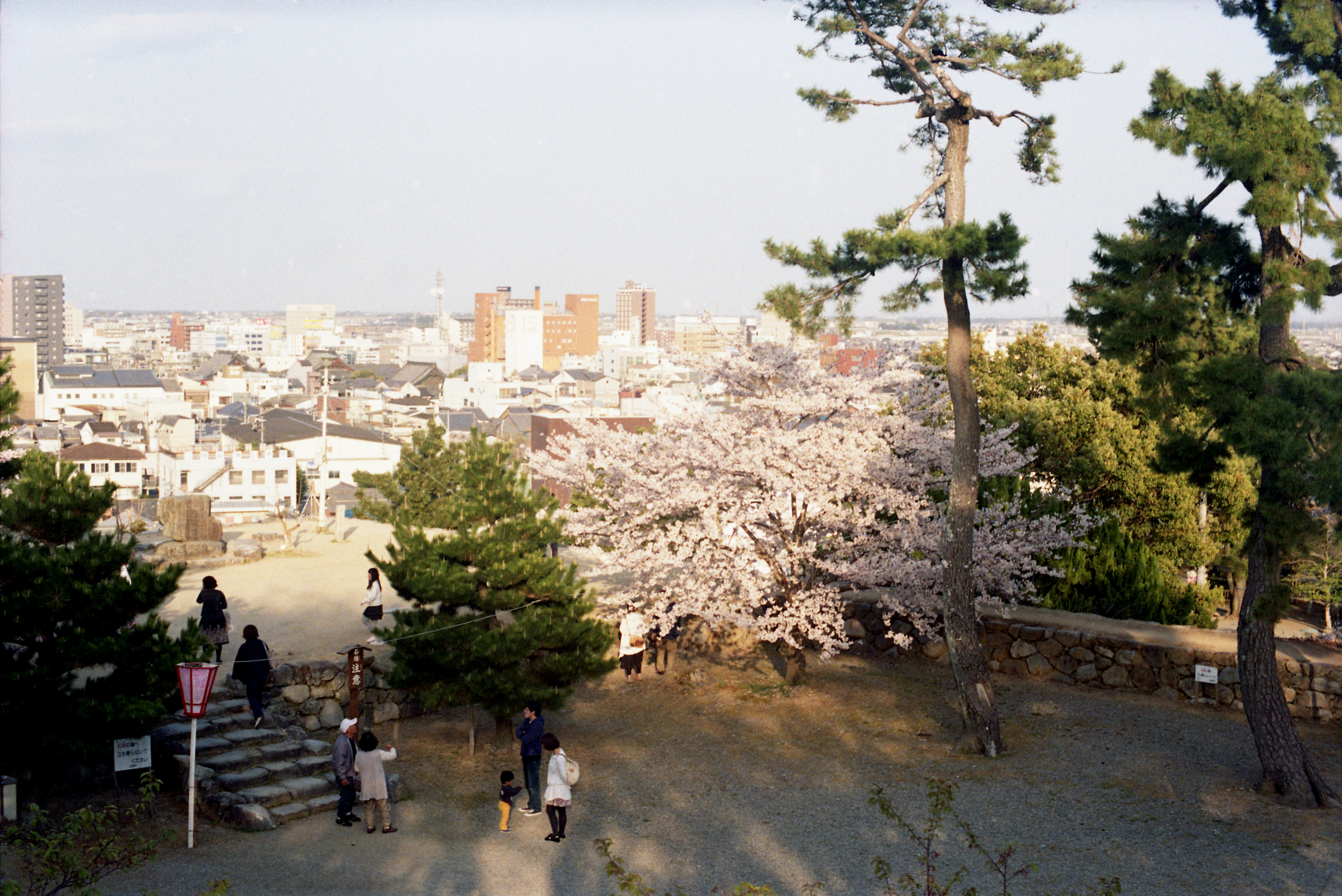
04.Matsusaka

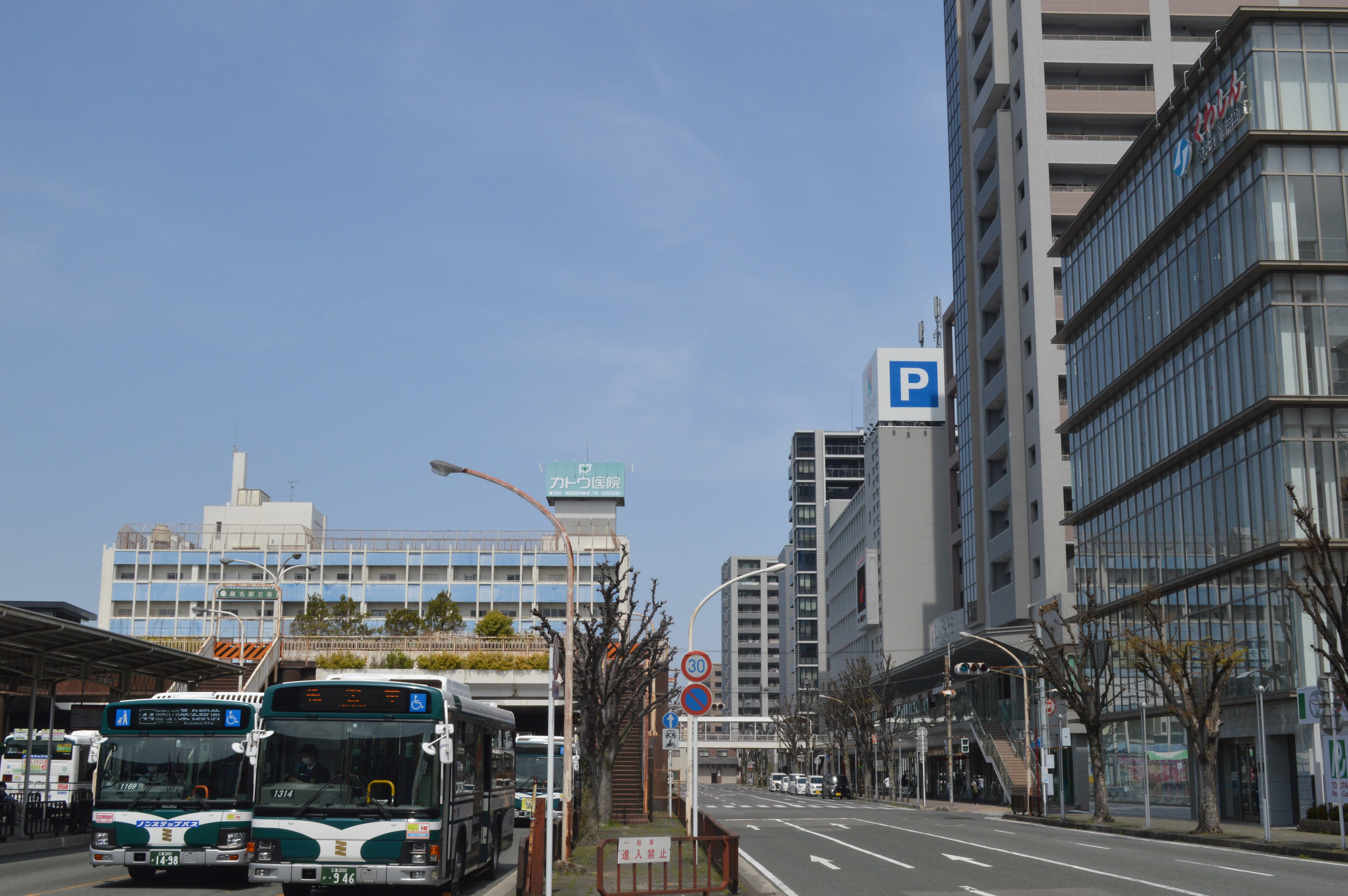
05.Kuwana

The following table lists the 27 cities, towns and villages in Mie with a population of at least 5,000 on October 1, 2015, according to the 2015 Census. The table also gives an overview of the evolution of the population since the 1995 census.

Rank (2015)	Name	Status	2015	2010	2005	2000	1995
1	Yokkaichi	City	311,031	307,766	303,845	302,102	296,623
2	Tsu	City	279,886	285,746	288,538	286,521	286,519
3	Suzuka	City	196,403	199,293	193,114	186,151	179,800
4	Matsusaka	City	163,863	168,017	168,973	164,504	163,131
5	Kuwana	City	140,303	140,290	138,963	134,856	129,595
6	Ise	City	127,817	130,271	135,030	136,173	138,404
7	Iga	City	90,581	97,207	100,623	101,527	101,435
8	Nabari	City	78,795	80,284	82,156	83,291	79,913
9	Shima	City	50,341	54,694	58,225	61,628	63,035
10	Kameyama	City	50,254	51,023	49,253	46,606	46,128
11	Inabe	City	45,815	45,684	46,446	45,630	45,746
12	Komono	Town	40,210	39,978	38,986	37,972	35,117
13	Tōin	Town	25,344	25,661	25,897	26,305	26,235
14	Meiwa	Town	22,586	22,833	22,618	22,300	21,853
15	Toba	City	19,448	21,435	23,067	24,945	26,806
16	Owase	City	18,009	20,033	22,103	23,683	25,258
17	Kumano	City	17,322	19,662	21,230	22,640	24,067
18	Kihoku	Town	16,338	18,611	19,963	21,362	22,478
19	Tamaki	Town	15,431	15,297	14,831	14,284	13,313
20	Taki	Town	14,878	15,438	15,793	16,149	15,644
21	Kawagoe	Town	14,752	14,003	13,048	11,782	10,863
22	Minamiise	Town	12,788	14,791	16,687	18,235	19,673
23	Kihō	Town	11,207	11,896	12,648	12,824	12,921
24	Asahi	Town	10,560	9,626	7,114	6,716	6,900
25	Ōdai	Town	9,557	10,416	11,099	11,399	11,758
26	Taiki	Town	8,939	9,846	10,788	11,334	11,921
27	Mihama	Town	8,741	9,376	9,903	10,030	9,914
28	Watarai	Town	8,309	8,692	9,057	9,218	9,077
29	Kisosaki	Town	6,357	6,855	6,965	7,172	7,231
