= Tamaru =

Tamaru may refer to:

- Tamaru Castle, a hilltop castle in Tamaki, Mie Prefecture, Japan
- Tamaru Station, a railway station in Tamaki, Mie Prefecture, Japan

== People with the surname ==
- Atsushi Tamaru (田丸 篤志, born 1986), Japanese voice actor
