= Tamaru Domain =

Tamaru Domain 田丸藩
- under Tokugawa shogunate Japan
- 1601–1871
- Capital: Tamaru Castle
- Area
  - Coordinates: 34°52′19.22″N 138°16′28.57″E
  - Type: Daimyō
- Historical era: Edo period
  - Established: 1601
  - Disestablished: 1871
- Today part of: part of Mie Prefecture

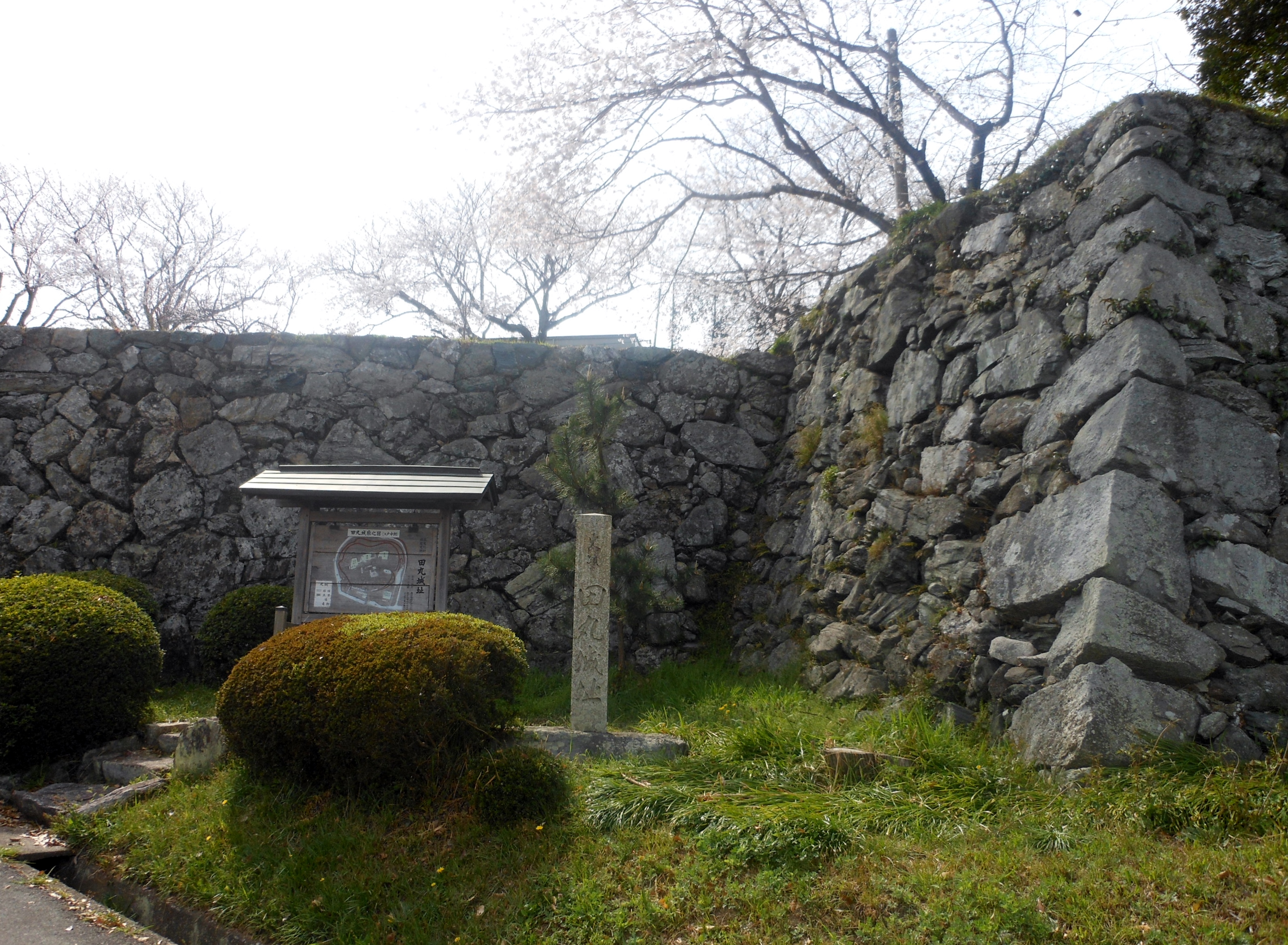
Remnant of the walls of Tamaru Castle

Tamaru Domain (田丸藩, Tamaru-han) was a feudal domain under the Tokugawa shogunate of Edo period Japan, located in Ise Province in what is now modern-day Tamaki, Mie. It was centered around Tamaru Castle. Tamaru Domain was controlled by the fudai Kuno clan through much of its history.

== History ==
Tamaru Castle was built by Kitabatake Chikafusa in 1336, after Emperor Go-Daigo had established the Southern Court, as a defence against the rival forces of the Northern Court. During the civil war of the Nanboku-chō period, a number of battles were fought over the castle. Eventually, the Kitabatake Clan established themselves in the castle. Later, the castle fell under the control of Oda Nobunaga's second son, Oda Nobukatsu. The castle town of Tamaru was more of a post town than a castle town as it was located on the junction between the Ise Honkaido and the Kumano Kaido, used by many pilgrims to the Ise Grand Shrine and Kumano Shrines.

Following the Battle of Sekigahara, the castle was awarded to Inaba Michito as the center of a 45,700 koku domain. Inaba had been a retainer of Toyotomi Hideyoshi, for whom he had constructed Fushimi Castle and had been awarded with large estates and permission to use the surname "Toyotomi". After Hideyoshi's death, he sided with Tokugawa Ieyasu and was active in the campaign against Kuki Yoshitaka and was thus awarded with the newly created Tamaru Domain. He had appointed a nephew as heir, but after the birth of a son, attempted to set the nephew aside. The nephew resisted, and Inaba Michito sent assassins to kill him. Inaba himself died under mysterious circumstances less than a year later. He was succeeded by the son, Inaba Yorimichi. However, the "curse" which was said to have killed his father was still active. Although Norimichi had fought well at the Siege of Osaka and had been promoted to Nagashima Domain in Settsu Province in 1616 and later to Fukuchiyama Domain in 1624, he went insane, and after murdering 60 townsmen, was ordered to commit seppuku by the shogunate. Tamaru was transferred to the control of Tsu Domain and from 1619 was part of the Kii Domain under Tokugawa Yorinobu.

In Tamaru, the domain was awarded to Kuno Munenari. The Kuno clan had been retainers of the Imagawa clan of Suruga Province and had entered into the service of Tokugawa Ieyasu, under whom they rose to the position of a 13,000 koku daimyō. However, due to an incident with Honda Tadakatsu during Shogun Tokugawa Hidetada's visit to Kyoto, the clan was demoted to 1000 koku. Due to his efforts at the Battle of Sekigahara, Kuno Munenari was able to recover the clan's fortunes back to 8500 koku, and following the Siege of Osaka, this was increased to 10,000 koku. He was awarded with a hereditary post as one of the karō of Kii Domain and became daimyō of Tamaru Domain.

The final daimyō of Tamaru Domain, Kuno Sumikata, was a noted poet, and sent some of his samurai to study Western military technology under Sakuma Shozan before the Meiji restoration He died shortly after the abolition of the han system in 1871.

== Holdings at the end of the Edo period ==
As with most domains in the han system, Tamaru Domain consisted of several discontinuous territories calculated to provide the assigned kokudaka, based on periodic cadastral surveys and projected agricultural yields.

== List of daimyō ==
#	Name	Tenure	Courtesy title	Court Rank	kokudaka
Inaba clan, 1600-1619 (fudai)
1	Inaba Michito (稲葉道通)	1600–1607	Sakon-kurando (左近蔵人)	Junior 5th Rank, Lower Grade (従五位下)	45,700 koku
1	Inaba Norimichi (稲葉紀通)	1607–1616	Awa-no-kami (淡路守)	Junior 5th Rank, Lower Grade (従五位下)	45,700 koku
Kuno clan, 1619 -1871 (fudai)
1	Kuno Munenari (久野宗成)	1619–1625	Tanba-no-kami (丹波守)	Junior 5th Rank, Lower Grade (従五位下)	10,000 koku
2	Kuno Muneharu (久野宗晴)	1625–1646	?	Junior 5th Rank, Lower Grade (従五位下)	10,000 koku
3	Kuno Musetoshi (久野宗俊)	1646–1701	Izumi-no-kami (和泉守)	Junior 5th Rank, Lower Grade (従五位下)	10,000 koku
4	Kuno Toshimasa (久野俊正)	1701–1726	Bingo-no-kami (備後守)	Junior 5th Rank, Lower Grade (従五位下)	10,000 koku
5	Kuno Toshizumi (久野俊純)	1726–1772	Tanba-no-kami ( 丹波守)	Junior 5th Rank, Lower Grade (従五位下)	10,000 koku
6	Kuno Teruzumi (久野輝純)	1772–1811	Ōmi-no-kami (近江守)	Junior 5th Rank, Lower Grade (従五位下)	10,000 koku
7	Kuno Masazumi (久野昌純)	1811–1823	-none-	Junior 5th Rank, Lower Grade (従五位下)	10,000 koku
8	Kuno Sumikata (久野純固)	1823–1871	Tanba-no-kami(丹波守)	Junior 5th Rank, Lower Grade (従五位下)	10,000 koku

== See also ==
- List of Han
- Abolition of the han system
