= Aso Station (Mie) =

Railway station in Taiki, Mie Prefecture, Japan

Aso Station 阿曽駅
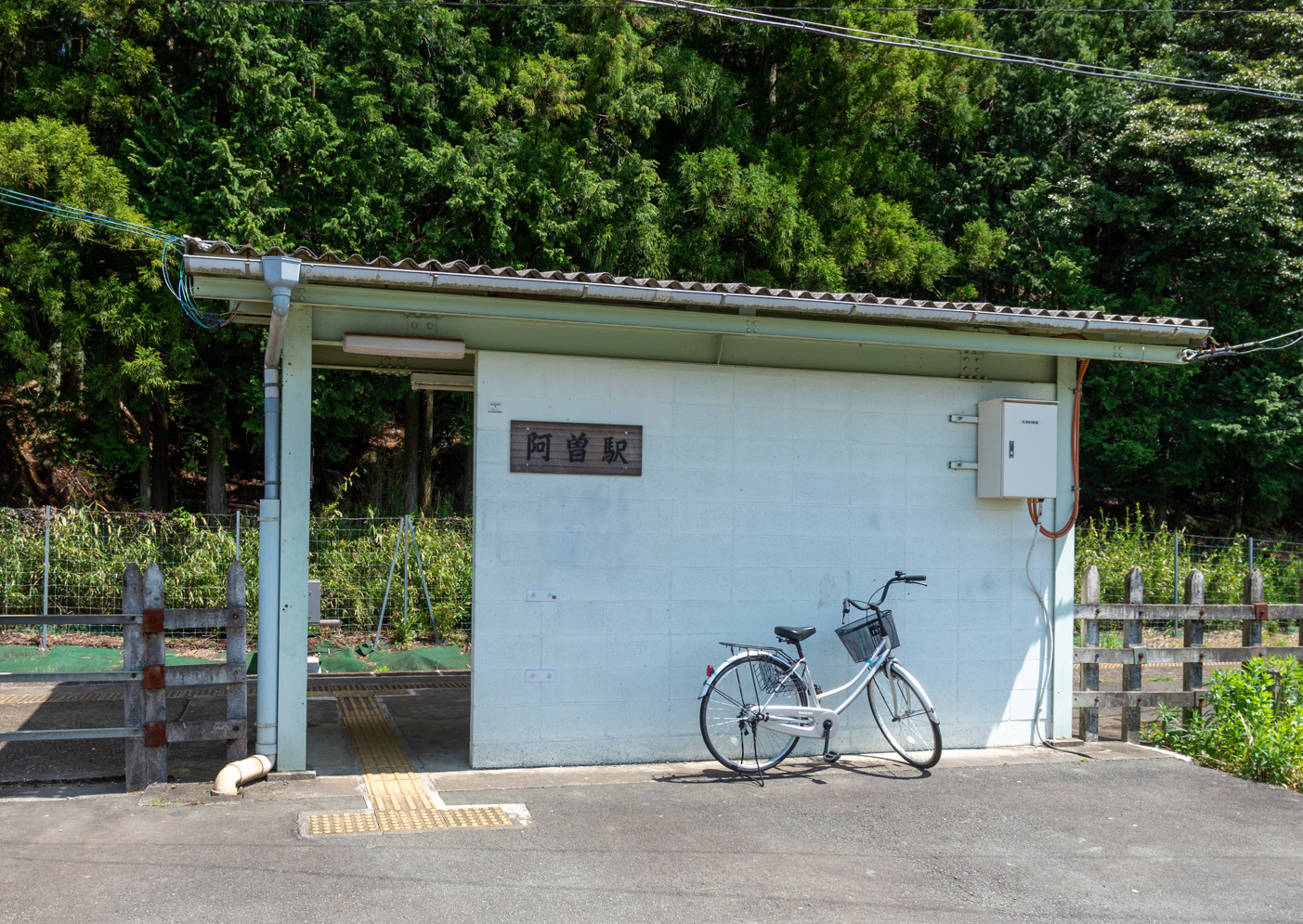
- Aso Station

General information
- Location: 1652 Aso, Taiki, Watarai District, Mie Prefecture 519-2704; Japan
- Coordinates: 34.3313°N 136.4108°E
- Operator: JR Tōkai
- Line: ■ Kisei Main Line
- Distance: 77.1 km from Kameyama
- Platforms: 1 side platform
- Tracks: 1
- Connections: Bus terminal

Other information
- Status: Unstaffed

History
- Opened: 8 November 1928

Passengers
- FY2019: 38 daily

Services
Preceding station	JR Central	Following station
Ise-Kashiwazaki towards Shingū	Kisei Main Line Local	Takihara towards Nagoya
Location
- Location within Mie Prefecture Location within Japan

Aso Station (阿曽駅, Aso-eki) is a passenger railway station in located in the town of Taiki, Watarai District, Mie Prefecture, Japan, operated by Central Japan Railway Company (JR Tōkai).

== Lines ==
Aso Station is served by the Kisei Main Line, and is located 77.1 km (47.9 mi) from the terminus of the line at Kameyama Station.

== Station layout ==
The station consists of a single side platform for bi-directional traffic. There is no station building, but only a small rain shelter on the platform. The station is unattended.

=== Platforms ===
1	■ Kisei Main Line	For Matsusaka, Nagoya; For Owase, Shingū

== History ==
Aso Station opened on 8 November 1928, as a station on the Japanese Government Railways (JGR) Kisei-East Line. The JGR became the Japan National Railways (JNR) after World War 2, and the line was renamed the Kisei Main Line on 15 July 1959. The station has been unattended since 21 December 1983. The station was absorbed into the JR Central network upon the privatization of the JNR on 1 April 1987.

== Passenger statistics ==
In fiscal 2019, the station was used by an average of 38 passengers daily (boarding passengers only).

== Surrounding area ==
- Aso Onsen

Ouchiyama River

- Kumano Kodo Iseji
- Ryusho-ji

== See also ==
- List of railway stations in Japan
