= Kiriko Isono =

- 磯野 貴理子
- Born: Kiriko Takahashi (高橋 貴理子, Takahashi Kiriko); February 1, 1964 (age 62); Nansei, Mie (now Minamiise), Japan
- Education: Mie Prefectural Nansei High School
- Occupations: Comedian, entertainer, actress
- Years active: 1987 -
- Agent: Ishii-Mitsuzo Office
- Height: 1.55 m (5 ft 1 in)
- Website: Official website

Kiriko Isono (磯野 貴理子, Isono Kiriko; born February 1, 1964, in Nansei, Mie (now Minamiise), Japan) is a Japanese comedian, entertainer, and actress represented by Ishii-Mitsuzo Office.

== Filmography ==
=== Current TV appearances ===
Title	Network	Notes
Hayaku Okita Asa wa...	Fuji TV	
Lion no Gokigen yō	Fuji TV	
Gyōretsu no Dekiru Horitsu Sōdansho	NTV	
Honmadekka!? TV	Fuji TV	
All-Star Thanksgiving	TBS	

Guest appearances

Title	Network	Notes
Himitsu no Kenmin Show	YTV	
Cream Quiz Miracle 9	TV Asahi	
Kasou Taishou	NTV	

=== Stage ===
Year	Title	Role	Notes
1993	Taikō-ki	Nene	
1993	Suttamonda Rikon	Neighbor of Kyoiku mama	
1994	Haha to Chichi e no Tegami	Tamako	
1995	Jokei Kazoku	Fujiyo Yajima	
1996	Shizuku Reru Kajitsu		

=== Former appearances ===
Title	Network	Notes
Dokusen! On'na no 60-bu	TV Asahi	
Ore-tachi Hyōkinzoku	Fuji TV	
Warai no Dendō	Fuji TV	
Lion no Itadakimasu	Fuji TV	
Heisei Kyōiku Yobikō	Fuji TV	
Hapihiru!	TBS	
Star Dokkiri (hi) Hōkoku	Fuji TV	
Sekai no Chō Gōka Chinpin Ryōri	Fuji TV	
Pikan TV	THK	Moderator
Midnight Mermaid	TV Asahi	
Challenge Dai Maō	TBS	
Shiawase Kazoku Keikaku	TBS	
Tabete Genki! Hora ne	ABC	
Okazu no Cooking	TV Asahi	
Ai no Apron	TV Asahi	Quasi-regular to regular appearances
Hapifuru!	Fuji TV	Tuesday to Wednesday appearances
IQ Sapuri	Fuji TV	
Ikkakusenkin! Nihon rū Rettō	Fuji TV	Quasi-regular appearances
Hon'ne no Dendō!! Shinsuke ni wa Wakaru Mai	Fuji TV	Quasi-regular appearances
Style Plus	THK	Occasional guest
Nekketsu! Heisei Kyōiku Gakuin	Fuji TV	
Tsūhan Bijin Trend Collection	KTV	
Shiawase no Kiiroi Koinu	CTV	

=== Dramas ===
Year	Title	Network	Notes
1989	Ame Yori mo Yasashiku	TBS	
1989	Sugishi hi no Serenade	Fuji TV	
1990	Otoko ni Tsuite	TBS	
1990	Last Dance	THK	
1991	Mama tte Kirei!?	TBS	
1991	Sensei no Okiniiri	TBS	
1991	Vingt Cinq Ans Kekkon	Fuji TV	
1991	Geisha Koharu no Kareina Bōken	TV Asahi	
1992	Shiawase no Ketsudan	Fuji TV	
1992	Tenshi no yō ni Ikite Mitai	TBS	
1993	Oka no Ue no Himawari	TBS	
1994	Kimi ga Mienai	KTV	
1994	Jū-jihan Nemu Jiken jō	NHK	
1995	Hashiranka!	NHK	
1995	Akarui Kazoku Keikaku	Fuji TV	
1996	Futari no Seesaw Game	TBS	
1996	Mōgamandekinai!	Fuji TV	
1997	Aguri	NHK	
1997	Momen no Hankerchief Light Winds Monogatari	NHK	
1998	Hashire Kōmuin!	Fuji TV	
1999	Bengoshi Mariko Sako no Yuigon Sakusei File	TBS	
1999	Furuhata Ninzaburō	Fuji TV	
2002	Mama no Idenshi	TBS	
2002	Kekkon Dorobō	NHK	
2002	Tensai Yanagisawa Kyōju no Seikatsu	Fuji TV	
2004	Nebaru On'na	NHK	
2004	Obāsan no Hanran: Isan wa Dare no Mono?	TV Asahi	Lead role
2009	Call Center no Koibito	ABC, TV Asahi	
2010	GeGeGe no Nyōbō	NHK	
2010	She's a Steely Woman!	TV Asahi	
2010	Tenshi no Dairinin	THK	Episode 2; Lead role
2012	Saiko no Jinsei	TBS	
2012	Nemurerumori no Jukujo	NHK	
2013	Ikkyū-san 2	Fuji TV	

=== Film ===
Year	Title	Role	Notes	Ref.
2023	Oshorin			
