= Umegadani Station =

Railway station in Taiki, Mie Prefecture, Japan

Umegadani Station 梅ヶ谷駅
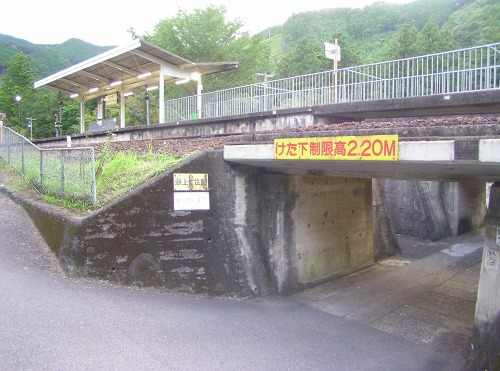
- Umegatani Station

General information
- Location: 1135 Ōuchiyama, Taiki-machi, Watarai-gun, Mie-ken 519-2700; Japan
- Coordinates: 34.2581°N 136.3564°E
- Operator: JR Tōkai
- Line: ■ Kisei Main Line
- Distance: 89.5 km from Kameyama
- Platforms: 1 island platform
- Tracks: 2
- Connections: Bus terminal

Construction
- Structure type: Ground level

Other information
- Status: Unstaffed

History
- Opened: November 1, 1965

Passengers
- FY2019: 17 daily

Services
Preceding station	JR Central	Following station
Kii-Nagashima towards Shingū	Kisei Main Line Local	Ōuchiyama towards Nagoya
Location
- Location within Mie Prefecture Location within Japan

Umegadani Station (梅ヶ谷駅, Umegadani-eki) is a passenger railway station in located in the town of Taiki, Watarai District, Mie Prefecture, Japan, operated by Central Japan Railway Company (JR Tōkai).

== Lines ==
Umegadani Station is served by the Kisei Main Line, and is located 89.5 km (55.6 mi) from the terminus of the line at Kameyama Station.

== Station layout ==
The station consists of a single island platform. There is no station building, but only a small rain shelter on the platform. The station is unattended.

=== Platforms ===
1	■ Kisei Main Line	For Matsusaka, Nagoya
2	■ Kisei Main Line	For Owase, Shingū

== History ==
Umegatani Station opened on 27 February 1965 as a signal stop on the Japan National Railways (JNR) Kisei Main Line. It was upgraded in status to a full station on 1 November 1965. The station was absorbed into the JR Central network upon the privatization of the (JNR) on 1 April 1987.

== Passenger statistics ==
In fiscal 2019, the station was used by an average of 17 passengers daily (boarding passengers only).

== Surrounding area ==
The station is a mountainous area with the Narisaka Pass on the south side. The Kisei Main Line crosses the Kii-Nagashima Pass between this station and Kii-Nagashima Station, which was the border between Ise and Kii. The east side of the station faces Japan National Route 42, and villages are scattered along the national highway. This station is the starting point for the Kumano Kodo Iseji Narisaka Pass and Tsuzurato Pass routes, and some of the limited express "Nanki" will stop as a temporary stop.

== See also ==
- List of railway stations in Japan
