= Ōuchiyama Station =

Railway station in Taiki, Mie Prefecture, Japan

Ōuchiyama Station 大内山駅
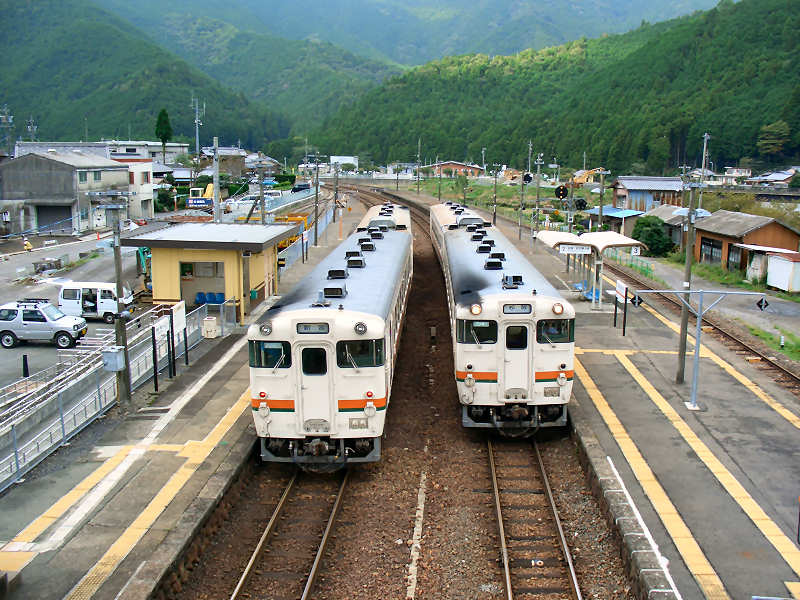
- Ōuchiyama Station

General information
- Location: 759 Ōuchiyama, Taiki-machi, Watarai-gun, Mie-ken 519-2700; Japan
- Coordinates: 34.2781°N 136.3590°E
- Operator: JR Tōkai
- Line: ■ Kisei Main Line
- Distance: 86.9 km from Kameyama
- Platforms: 1side + 1 island platform
- Tracks: 2
- Connections: Bus terminal

Construction
- Structure type: Ground level

Other information
- Status: Unstaffed

History
- Opened: November 13, 1927

Passengers
- FY2019: 35 daily

Services
Preceding station	JR Central	Following station
Umegadani towards Shingū	Kisei Main Line Local	Ise-Kashiwazaki towards Nagoya
Location
- Location within Mie Prefecture Location within Japan

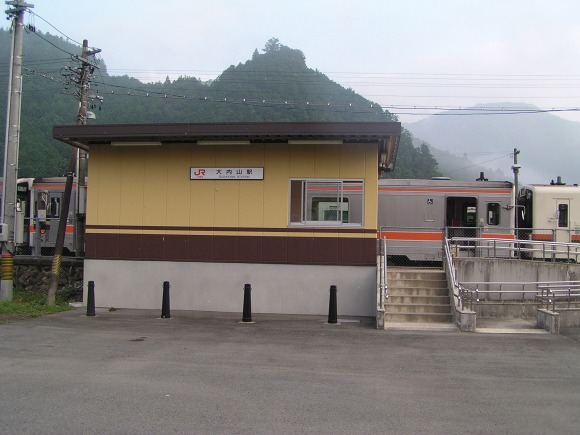
Station building

Ōuchiyama Station (大内山駅, Ōuchiyama-eki) is a passenger railway station in Taiki, Watarai District, Mie Prefecture, Japan, operated by Central Japan Railway Company (JR Tōkai).

== Lines ==
Ōuchiyama Station is served by the Kisei Main Line, and is located 86.9 km (54.0 mi) from the terminus of the line at Kameyama Station.

== Station layout ==
The station consists of a single side platform and a single island platform serving three tracks, connected by a footbridge. The station is unattended.

=== Platforms ===
1	■ Kisei Main Line	For Owase, Shingū
2, 3	■ Kisei Main Line	For Matsusaka, Nagoya

== History ==
Ōuchiyama Station opened on 13 November 1927 as a station on the Japanese Government Railways (JGR) Kisei-East Line. The line was extended on to Kii-Nagashima Station on 26 April 1929. The JGR became the Japan National Railways (JNR) after World War 2, and the line was renamed the Kisei Main Line on 15 July 1959. The station has been unattended since 21 December 1983. The station was absorbed into the JR Central network upon the privatization of the JNR on 1 April 1987. A new station building was completed in 2002.

== Passenger statistics ==
In fiscal 2019, the station was used by an average of 35 passengers daily (boarding passengers only).

== Surrounding area ==
- Ouchiyama Wild Bird Observatory
- Ouchiyama Elementary School
- Kobenomiyayomo Shrine
- Ouchiyama Zoo

== See also ==
- List of railway stations in Japan
