= Ise-Kashiwazaki Station =

Railway station in Taiki, Mie Prefecture, Japan

Ise-Kashiwazaki Station 伊勢柏崎駅
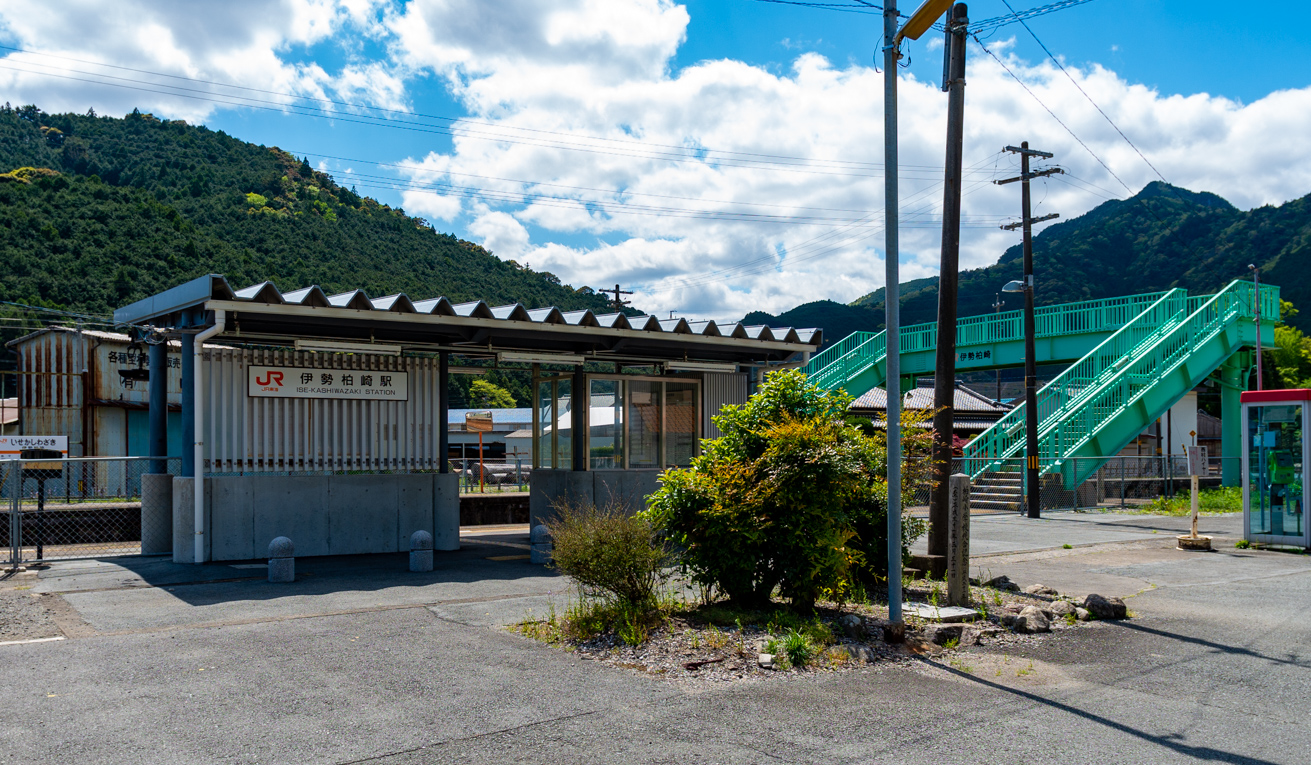
- Ise-Kashiwazaki Station

General information
- Location: 225 Saki, Taiki-machi, Watarai-gun, Mie-ken 519-2802; Japan
- Coordinates: 34.2997°N 136.3959°E
- Operator: JR Tōkai
- Line: ■ Kisei Main Line
- Distance: 82.2 km from Kameyama
- Platforms: 2 side platforms
- Tracks: 2
- Connections: Bus terminal

Construction
- Structure type: Ground level

Other information
- Status: Unstaffed

History
- Opened: 3 July 1927

Passengers
- FY2019: 86 daily

Services
Preceding station	JR Central	Following station
Ōuchiyama towards Shingū	Kisei Main Line Local	Aso towards Nagoya
Location
- Location within Mie Prefecture Location within Japan

Ise-Kashiwazaki Station (伊勢柏崎駅, Ise-Kashiwazaki-eki) is a passenger railway station in located in the town of Taiki, Watarai District, Mie Prefecture, Japan, operated by Central Japan Railway Company (JR Tōkai).

== Lines ==
Ise-Kashiwazaki Station is served by the Kisei Main Line, and is located 82.2 km (51.1 mi) from the terminus of the line at Kameyama Station.

== Station layout ==
The station consists of two opposed side platforms, connected by a footbridge. The station is unattended.

=== Platforms ===
1	■ Kisei Main Line	For Matsusaka, Nagoya
2	■ Kisei Main Line	For Owase, Shingū

== History ==
Ise-Kashiwazaki Station opened on 3 July 1927 as a station on the Japanese Government Railways (JGR) Kisei-East Line. The line was extended on to Ōuchiyama Station on 13 November 1927. The JGR became the Japan National Railways (JNR) after World War 2, and the line was renamed the Kisei Main Line on 15 July 1959. The station has been unattended since 21 December 1983. The station was absorbed into the JR Central network upon the privatization of the JNR on 1 April 1987.

== Passenger statistics ==
In fiscal 2019, the station was used by an average of 86 passengers daily (boarding passengers only).

== Surrounding area ==
- Taiki Municipal Taiki Junior High School
- Ouchiyama River
- Nishiki fishing port

== See also ==
- List of railway stations in Japan
