= Kisei =

Kisei may refer to:

- Kisei (shogi), a title in shogi
- Kisei (go), a title and competition in Go
- Kisei, Mie, a former town in Watarai District, Mie, Japan
- Kisei (North Korean village), a North Korean village in the Demilitarized Zone on the Korean Peninsula
