= Tamaru Station =

Railway station in Tamaki, Mie Prefecture, Japan

Tamaru Station 田丸駅
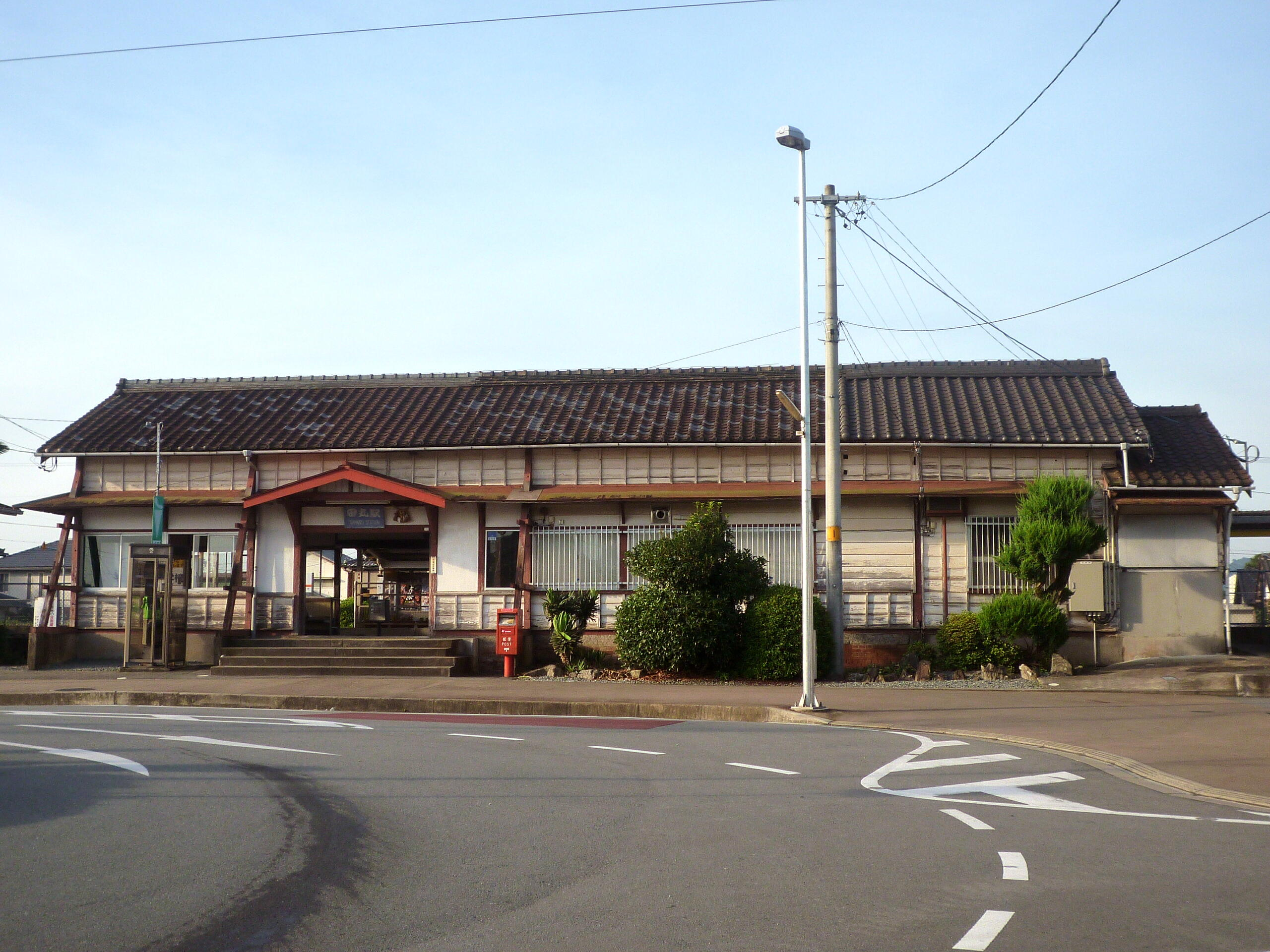
- Tamaru Station

General information
- Location: 80 Sata, Tamaki-cho, Watarai-gun, Mie-ken 519-0414; Japan
- Coordinates: 34.4878°N 136.6346°E
- Operator: JR Tōkai
- Line: ■ Sangū Line
- Distance: 60.8 km from Kameyama
- Platforms: 2 side platforms
- Connections: Bus terminal

Other information
- Status: Unstaffed

History
- Opened: December 31, 1893; 132 years ago

Passengers
- FY2019: 550 daily
Location
- Location within Mie Prefecture Location within Japan

Tamaru Station (田丸駅, Tamaru-eki) is a passenger railway station in located in the town of Tamaki, Watarai District, Mie Prefecture, Japan, operated by Central Japan Railway Company (JR Tōkai).

== Lines ==
Tamaru Station is served by the Sangū Line, and is located 7.0 rail kilometers from the terminus of the line at Taki Station.

== Station layout ==
The station consists of two opposed side platforms, connected by a level crossing. The station is unattended.

=== Platforms ===
1	■ Sangū Line	For Iseshi; For Toba
2	■ Sangū Line	for Matsusaka, Kameyama, Yokkaichi and Nagoya

== Adjacent stations ==
«	Service	»
JR Sangū Line
Tokida	Local	Miyagawa
Taki	Rapid "Mie" 4 for Nagoya	Miyagawa
Tokida	Rapid "Mie" 2 for Nagoya; Rapid "Mie" 19, 21, 23, 25 for Iseshi	Miyagawa

== History ==
Tamaru Station opened on December 31, 1893, as a station on the privately owned Sangū Railway. The line was nationalized on October 1, 1907, becoming part of the Japanese Government Railway (JGR), which became the Japan National Railways (JNR) after World War II. The current station building was completed in 1912. The station was absorbed into the JR Central network upon the privatization of the JNR on April 1, 1987. The station has been unattended since October 1, 2012.

== Passenger statistics ==
In fiscal 2019, the station was used by an average of 550 passengers daily (boarding passengers only).

== Surrounding area ==
- Tamaru Castle ruins
- Tamaki Town Hall

== See also ==
- List of railway stations in Japan
