= Ōmiya, Mie =

Dissolved municipality in Mie prefecture, Japan

Ōmiya (大宮町, Ōmiya-chō) was a town located in Watarai District, Mie Prefecture, Japan.

As of 2003, the town had an estimated population of 5,081 and a density of 50.47 persons per km^{2}. The total area was 100.68 km^{2}.

On February 14, 2005, Ōmiya, along with the town of Kisei, and the village of Ōuchiyama (all from Watarai District), was merged to create the town of Taiki and thus no longer exists as an independent municipality.
