= Misono, Mie =

Village in Watarai District, Mie Prefecture, Japan

Misono (御薗村, Misono-mura) was a village located in Watarai District, Mie Prefecture, Japan.

As of 2003, the village had an estimated population of 9,216 and a density of 1,523.31 persons per km^{2}. The total area was 6.05 km^{2}.

On November 1, 2005, Misono, along with the towns of Futami and Obata (all from Watarai District), was merged into the expanded city of Ise and thus no longer exists as an independent municipality.
