= Obata, Mie =

Dissolved municipality in Mie prefecture, Japan

Obata (小俣町, Obata-chō) was a town located in Watarai District, Mie Prefecture, Japan.

== Population ==
As of 2003, the town had an estimated population of 18,437 and a density of 1,594.90 persons per km^{2}. The total area was 11.56 km^{2}.

== Merge ==
On November 1, 2005, Obata, along with the town of Futami, and the village of Misono (all from Watarai District), was merged into the expanded city of Ise and thus no longer exists as an independent municipality.
