= Futami, Mie =

Dissolved municipality in Mie prefecture, Japan

Futami (二見町, Futami-chō) was a town in Watarai District, Mie Prefecture, Japan.

As of 2003, the town had an estimated population of 9,008 and a density of 754.44 persons per km². The total area was 11.94 km².

On November 1, 2005, Futami, along with the town of Obata, and the village of Misono (all from Watarai District), was merged into the expanded city of Ise and thus no longer exists as an independent municipality.

The Meoto Iwa are two "wedded rocks", in the sea by the town.

Futami is mentioned by Matsuo Bashō in his haiku hamaguri no / futami ni wakare / yuku aki zo. Literally, Hamaguri clams of Futami break apart in Autumn. Poetically,
As firmly cemented clam shells
Fall apart in Autumn
So too, I take to the road again
