= Kanamaru clan =

Kanamaru clan 金丸氏
- Kanamaru clan mon
- Home province: Kai
- Parent house: Minamoto clan (源氏); Takeda clan (武田氏)
- Founder: Kanamaru Mitsushige (金丸光重)
- Founding year: 15th century
- Cadet branches: Mihara-Kanamaru clan (三原藩金丸氏)

The Kanamaru clan (金丸氏, Kanamaru-shi) was a Japanese samurai clan that were a branch of the Takeda clan of Kai Province. Their main stronghold was Kanamaru Castle. They were known for their martial prowess and discipline. They were masters of the use of teppō units, and their ashigaru (infantry) were trained in all types of strategies and tactics, to include sword fighting and the use of the arquebus.

== Origins ==
The Kanamaru clan were a branch family of the Takeda clan of Kai Province who descended from Minamoto no Yoshikiyo of the Seiwa Genji branch of the Minamoto clan. Kanamaru Mitsushige (金丸光重), the founder of the clan was the third son of Takeda Nobushige (武田信重) but he had no children. His adopted heir, Kanamaru Mitsunobu (金丸光信), was a son of Ishiki Fujinao (一色藤直).

== Family Tree ==
Takeda Nobushige (武田信重, 1386–1450)
 　┃
Kanamaru Mitsushige (金丸光重, ?–?), Kanamaru Uemon (金丸右衛門).
 　┇
Kanamaru Mitsunobu (金丸光信, ?–?), adopted, was Ishiki Fujitsugu (一色藤次), son of Ishiki Fujinao (一色藤直).
 　┃
Kanamaru Taketsugu (金丸虎嗣, ?–?), Wakasa-no-kami (若狭守).
 　┃
Kanamaru Takeyoshi (金丸虎義, ?–?), Chikuzen-no-kami (筑前守).
Six sons:
1st: Kanamaru Masanao (金丸昌直, ?–?)
2nd: Tsuchiyama Masatsugu (土屋昌続, 1544–1575)
3rd: Akiyama Chikahisa (秋山親久, 1562–1582)
4th: Kanamaru Sadamitsu (金丸定光, ?–1582)
5th: Tsuchiyama Masatsune (土屋昌恒, 1566?–1582)
6th: Tsuchiyama Masanao (土屋正直, ?–?)

 　┣━━━━━━━━━━━━━━━━━━━━━━━━━━━━━━━━━━━━━━━━━━━━━━━━━┓
Kanamaru Masanao (金丸昌直, ?–?)　　　　　　 Kanamaru Sadamitsu (定光, ?–1582)
 　╠═════════════════════════════════════════════════╝
Sadamitsu (定光, ?–1582), adopted by older brother.
 　┃
Sadanobu (定信, ?–?)
　 ┣━━━━━━━━━━━━━━━━━━━━━━━━━━━━━┓
Shigetsugu (重次, ?–?)　　   Yoshitsugu (吉次)
 　┃
Shigeyoshi (重良, ?–?)
 　┃
Shigemasa (重政, ?–?)
 　┣━━━━━━━━━━━━━━━━━━━━━━━━━━━━━━━━━━━━┳━━━━━━━━━━━━━━━━━━━━━━━━━━━━━━━━━━┓
Choshirō (長四郎, ?–?) 　　　　  Domon Masatoyo (多門正豊)　　　　　　　Sadatomo (定曹)
 　┇
Sadatoyo (定曹, ?–?)
 　╠════════════════════════════════════╗
Matasaburo (又三郎, ?–?)　　 　　　  Takemitsu (虎光)

== See also ==
- Takeda clan
- Seiwa Genji
- Minamoto clan
