= Tamaru Castle =

Japanese castle

- 田丸城
- Tamaki, Mie Prefecture, Japan
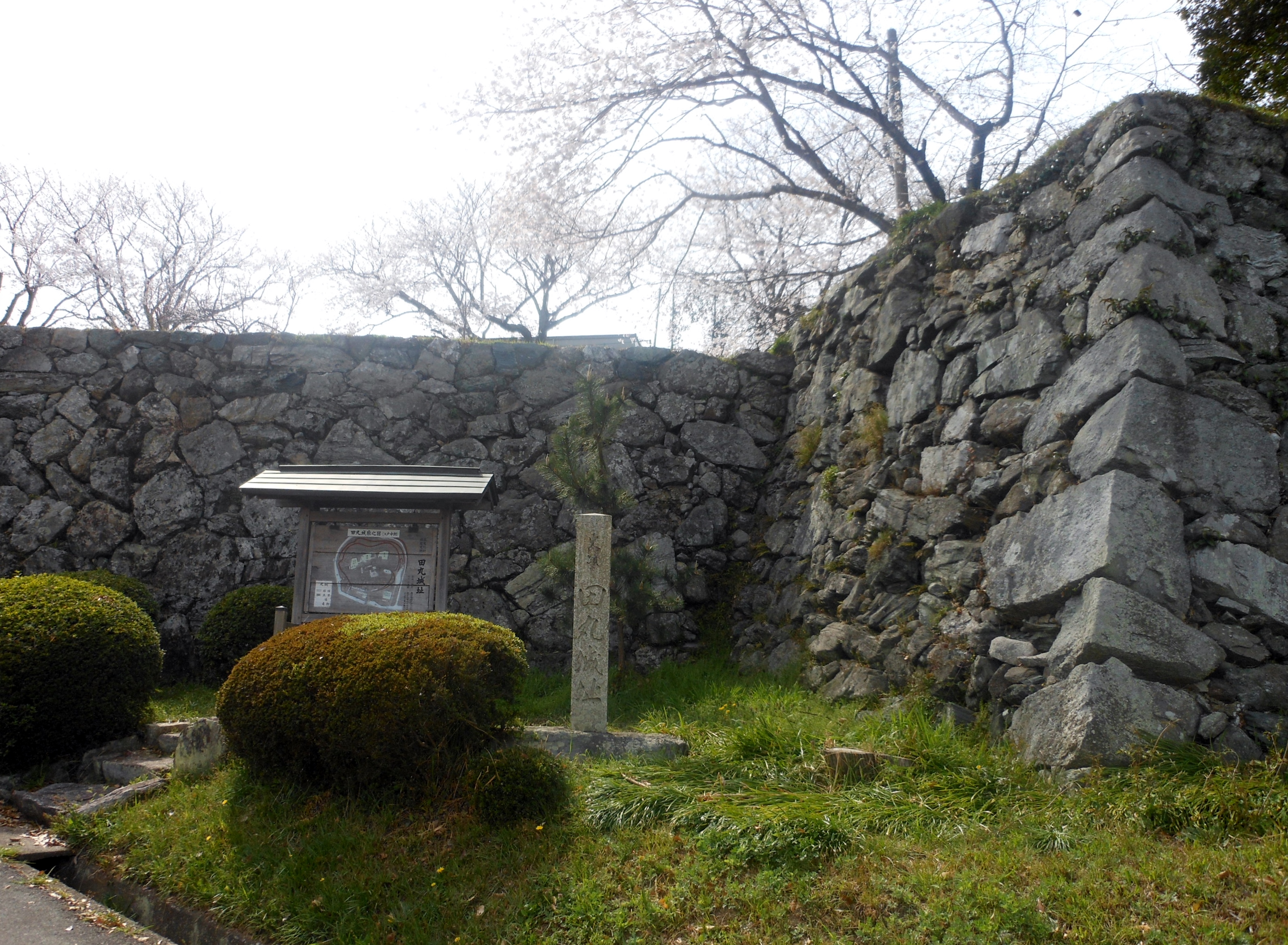
- Stone wall of Tamaru Castle

Site information
- Type: hirayama-style Japanese castle
- Open to the public: yes

Location
- Coordinates: 34°29′27″N 136°37′40.5″E

Site history
- Built: 1336
- Built by: Kitabatake Chikafusa
- In use: Muromachi to Edo period
- Demolished: 1871

Tamaru Castle (田丸城, Tamaru-jō) was a Japanese castle located in Tamaki, northern Mie Prefecture, Japan. At the end of the Edo period, Tamaru Castle was home to the Kuno clan, daimyō of Tamaru Domain and one of the hereditary karō to Kii Domain. The ruins are a Mie Prefecture Historic Site.

== History ==
Tamaru Castle is located on a hill between the Kushidagawa river and Miyawawa river in Watarai District of Ise Province. This area was a strategic junction between the Ise Honkaidō and the Kumano Kaidō, used by many pilgrims to the Ise Grand Shrine and Kumano Shrines. In the Muromachi period, southern Ise was ruled by the Kitabatake clan, who had supported Emperor Go-Daigo and the Southern Court during the Nanboku-chō period. In 1336, Kitabatake Chikafusa built a castle at this location initially to protect the eastern approaches to Yoshino, where the emperor had found refuge, but also access to the important shrines at Ise and Kumano. It was briefly taken by Ashikaga Takauji in 1342, but as recovered soon after by the Kitabatake. In 1569, Oda Nobunaga invaded Ise Province, defeating the Kitabatake, who were forced to accept Nobunaga's second son, Oda Nobukatsu, as their heir. In 1575, Nobukatsu formally succeeded to head of the clan, and the following year (at Nobunaga's bequest), he invited all of the prominent members of the Kitabatake clan and its cadet branches to a banquet, at which he had all of them killed.

In 1576 Nobukatsu significantly rebuilt Tamaru Castle as his main residence. Nobukatsu commissioned the addition of stone walls and a tenshu, which were completed just before Nobunaga's construction of Azuchi Castle, which is also known to have featured a tower. As such, Tamaru Castle is thought to be the first Japanese castle to include a tower. However, Nobukatsu was less successful politically. In 1579 he attacked Iga Province without Nobunaga's approval and suffered a major defeat. In 1580, Tamaru Castle burned down, and Nobukatsu relocated his seat to Matsugashima Castle near the coast. After Nobunaga's assassination in 1582, he was briefly allied with Toyotomi Hideyoshi, but was deprived of his territories and in the end survived only a minor daimyō within the structure of the Tokugawa shogunate.

After the start of the Tokugawa shogunate, the castle was awarded to Inaba Michito as the center of a 45,700 koku Tamaru Domain. Inaba had been a retainer of Toyotomi Hideyoshi, for whom he had constructed Fushimi Castle and had been awarded with large estates and permission to use the surname "Toyotomi". After Hideyoshi's death, he sided with Tokugawa Ieyasu at the Battle of Sekigahara. He had appointed a nephew as heir, but after the birth of a son, attempted to set the nephew aside. The nephew resisted, and Inaba Michito sent assassins to kill him. Inaba himself died under mysterious circumstances less than a year later. He was succeeded by the son, Inaba Yorimichi. However, the "curse" which was said to have killed his father was still active. After being transferred to Fukuchiyama Domain in 1624, he went insane, and after murdering 60 townsmen, was ordered to commit seppuku by the shogunate.

Tamaru was transferred to the control of Tsu Domain and from 1619 was part of the Kii Domain under Tokugawa Yorinobu. Tamaru Castle was retained by Kii Domain despite the shogunate's official position of "one castle per domain", and was assigned to the Kuno clan, who became one of the hereditary karō clans supporting Kii Domain. The Kuno ruled for eight generations to the Meiji Restoration.

== Structure of Tamaru Castle ==
The castle is located on a small high with an elevation of around 30 meters, and occupies a roughly circular area 400 meters in diameter. The western half of the area is slightly higher in elevation and was the core area of the castle, containing the Honmaru (inner bailey), which was a rectangular area 100 by 50 meters. The tenshu was located at the northern edge, and a 25-meter square foundation base remains. To the south was the Ni-no-maru secondary enclosure, which was separated by a dry moat and bridge, with Masugata-style gates. To the north of the central area was the Kitanomaru enclosure. The whole was also surrounded by water-filled moats

With the establishment of the Meiji government, the remaining structures of the castle were demolished; however, much of the stone walls, base of the tenshu and the moats remain relatively intact. The site is now a park, with portions occupied by the Tamaki Town Hall and Tamaki Town Tamaki Junior High School.

The castle was listed as one of the Continued Top 100 Japanese Castles in 2017.

== Literature ==
- De Lange, William (2021). An Encyclopedia of Japanese Castles. Groningen: Toyo Press. pp. 600 pages. ISBN 978-9492722300.
- Schmorleitz, Morton S. (1974). Castles in Japan. Tokyo: Charles E. Tuttle Co. pp. 144–145. ISBN 0-8048-1102-4.
- Motoo, Hinago (1986). Japanese Castles. Tokyo: Kodansha. ISBN 0-87011-766-1.
- Mitchelhill, Jennifer (2004). Castles of the Samurai: Power and Beauty. Tokyo: Kodansha. ISBN 4-7700-2954-3.
- Turnbull, Stephen (2003). Japanese Castles 1540–1640. Osprey Publishing. ISBN 1-84176-429-9.
