= Nantō, Mie =

Dissolved municipality in Mie prefecture, Japan

Nantō (南島町, Nantō-chō) was a town located in Watarai District, Mie Prefecture, Japan.

As of 2003, the town had an estimated population of 7,440 and a density of 55.92 persons per km^{2}. The total area was 133.04 km^{2}.

On October 1, 2005, Nantō, along with the town of Nansei (also from Watarai District), was merged to create the town of Minamiise and thus no longer exists as an independent municipality.
