= Ōuchiyama, Mie =

Dissolved municipality in Mie prefecture, Japan

Ōuchiyama (大内山村, Ōuchiyama-mura) was a village in Watarai District, Mie Prefecture, Japan.

As of 2003, the village had an estimated population of 1,543 and a density of 23.84 persons per km^{2}. The total area was 64.73 km^{2}.

On February 14, 2005, Ōuchiyama, along with the towns of Kisei and Ōmiya (all from Watarai District), was merged to create the town of Taiki and thus no longer exists as an independent municipality.
