= Mihara Domain =

Mihara Domain 三原藩
- Part of Hiroshima Domain
- Mihara, Hiroshima, Japan
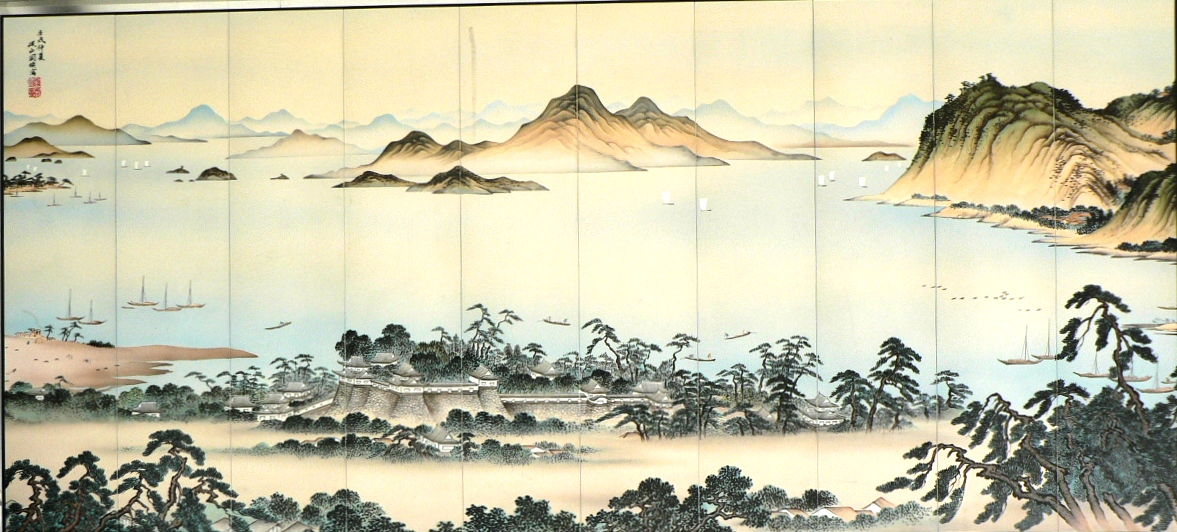
- Mihara Castle, a.k.a. "The Floating Castle (Ukishirō)"

Site information
- Type: Azuchi-Momoyama castle
- Controlled by: Kobayakawa clan (1567–1587); Fukushima clan (1600–1619); Asano clan (1619–1869); Japan (1869–1945)
- Condition: Ruins, National Historic Site

Location
- Coordinates: 34°24′N 133°5′E

Site history
- Built: 1567
- Built by: Kobayakawa Takakage
- In use: 1567–1945
- Materials: stone, wood, plaster walls (original); concrete, steel, wood, stone, plaster (reconstruction)
- Demolished: 1975, construction of a new rail-line.

The Mihara Domain (三原藩, Mihara-han) was a feudal domain of Japan in the Edo period. Located in what is now Mihara City, Hiroshima Prefecture, it encompassed the southern part of Bingo Province. Its headquarter was Mihara Castle (三原城 Mihara-jō). At its peak, it was rated at 30,000 koku. For more than two hundred years the daimyō of Mihara were a collateral branch of the Asano clan who held Hiroshima Domain. It was a subordinate of Hiroshima Domain where the main line of the Asano clan ruled from.

== History ==
Mihara Castle was built 1567 by Kobayakawa Takakage, the third son of the famous warlord Mōri Motonari who controlled most of Aki and Bingo Provinces. It was a large scale castle with 3 baileys, 32 sumi yagura (corner towers), and 14 mon (gates). It was built on the coast and connected two islands giving rise to the nickname Ukishirō or "floating castle." Kobayakawa Takakage moved from Niitakayama Castle (新高山城), a typical mountaintop castle, to this site to better manage the Mōri clan's naval forces and to help protect from Oda Nobunaga who was advancing from the east.

Kobayakawa Takakage took part in the Japanese invasions of Korea (1592–98) and adopted Kobayakawa Hideaki who was the adopted son of Toyotomi Hideyoshi. After the Battle of Sekigahara in 1600, Hideaki who had helped Tokugawa Ieyasu gain control of the country was awarded with the defeated Ukita clan's former fiefdoms of Bizen and Mimasaka, for a total of 550,000 koku.

The shōgun, Tokugawa Ieyasu, transferred Fukushima Masanori who was formerly the ruler of Kiyosu Castle to Hiroshima Castle of the Hiroshima Domain and his adopted son Fukushima Masayuki became lord of the Mihara Domain from Mihara Castle. Shortly afterwards the Fukushima clan lost favor with the shōgun when Fukushima Masanori made repairs to Hiroshima Castle which was prohibited by law. This resulted in the Fukushima clan being replaced by the Asano clan who would rule the domains of Hiroshima, Mihara, Yoshida and Ako until the Meiji Restoration.

The tenshu foundation of Mihara Castle was the largest ever built, similar in size to that of Edo Castle, but the main keep was never actually built. The castle escaped demolition during the Meiji period so that it could be used as Imperial naval base. It was later decommissioned and Mihara Train Station was built on the site in 1894. At this time all the buildings were destroyed and much of the stone walls torn down. The honmaru was further cut to make way for the bullet train in 1975. Together with Kobayakawa's Niitakayama Castle (新高山城) it is designated a National Historic Site.

== List of Daimyō ==
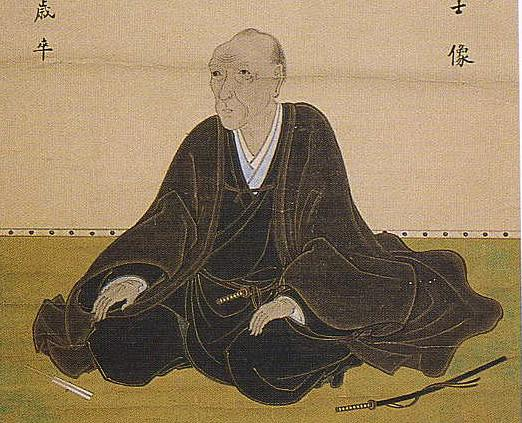
Portrait of the third daimyō, Asano Tadayoshi.

Order	Name	Japanese	Lifetime	Reign	Information
1	Kobayakawa Takakage	小早川隆景	1533–1597	1582–1597	Built Mihara Castle, 3rd son of Mōri Motonari.
2	Fukushima Masayuki	福島正之	1585–1608	1600–1608 (evicted)	Adopted son of Fukushima Masanori.
3	Asano Tadayoshi	浅野忠吉	1546–1621	1619–1621 (died)	Cousin of Asano Nagamasa, son of Asano Nagatada.
4	Asano Tadanaga	浅野忠長	1592–1660	1621–1656 (retired)	Adopted, son of Oobashi Kiyobei (大橋清兵衛) and Asano Tadayoshi's (#3) daughter.
5	Asano Tadazane	浅野忠真	1618–1694	1656–1683 (retired)	son of #4, retired.
6	Asano Tadayoshi	浅野忠義	1667–1730	1683–1730 (died)	son of #5.
7	Asano Tadamasa	浅野忠綏	1702–1758	1730–1758 (died)	son of #6.
8	Asano Tadachika	浅野忠晨	1732–1795	1758–1759 (retired)	son of #7.
9	Asano Tadamasa	浅野忠正	1721–1767	1759–1767 (died)	son of #6.
10	Asano Tadayoshi	浅野忠愛	1752–1793	1767–1793 (died)	son of #7.
11	Asano Tadasuke	浅野忠順	1790–1824	1793–1814 (retired)	Adopted, son of Asano Shigeakira of the Hiroshima Domain and Asano Tadayoshi's (#10) daughter.
12	Asano Tadahide	浅野忠敬	1802–1860	1814–1843 (died)	Adopted, son of Tōdō Kenzaki Nobuhide (藤堂監物信任) and Asano Tadamasa's (#9) daughter.
13	Asano Tetsu	浅野忠	1819–1892	1843–1868	son #11.

== Retainers (家臣) ==
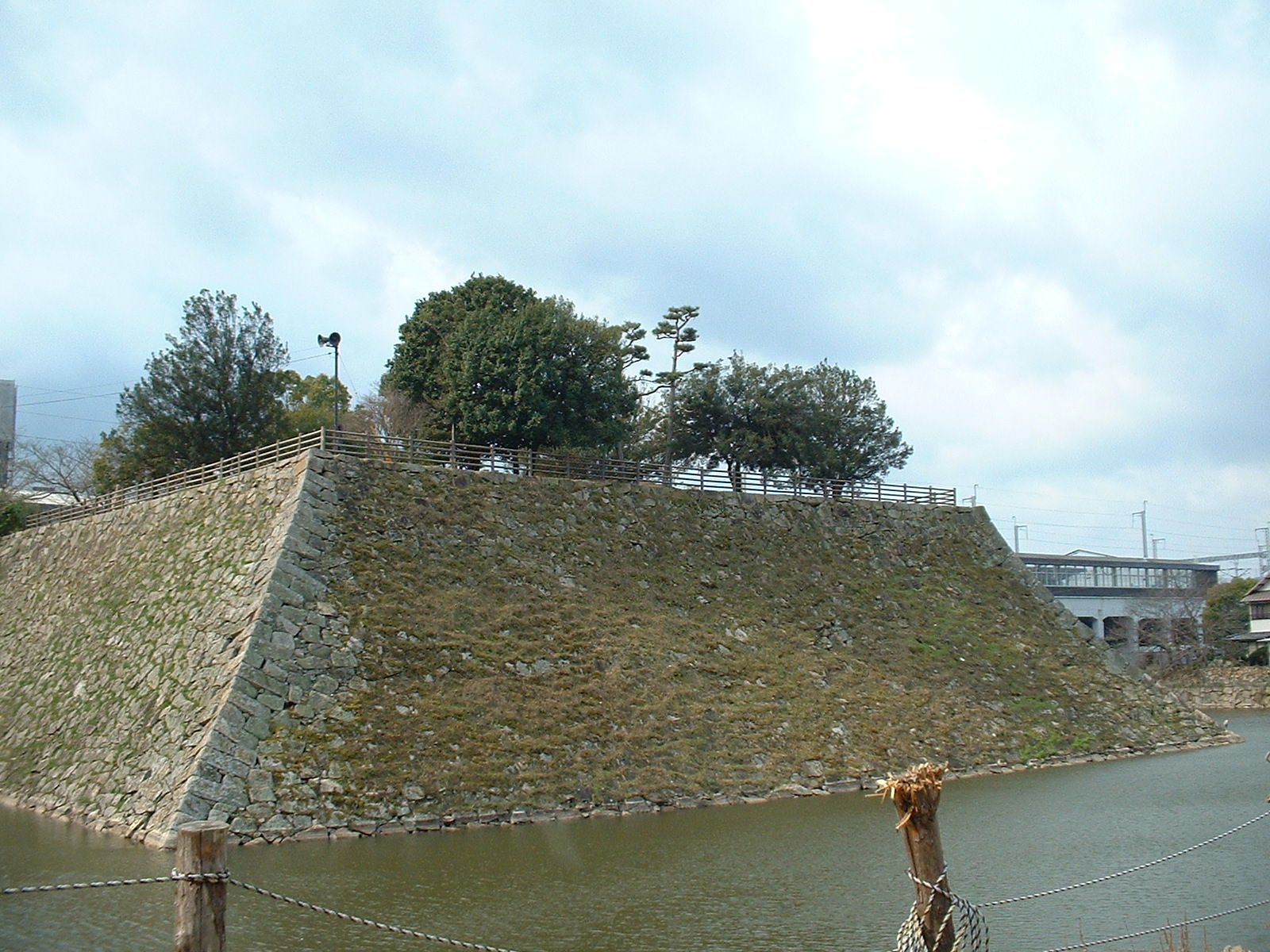
The tenshu foundation of Mihara Castle.

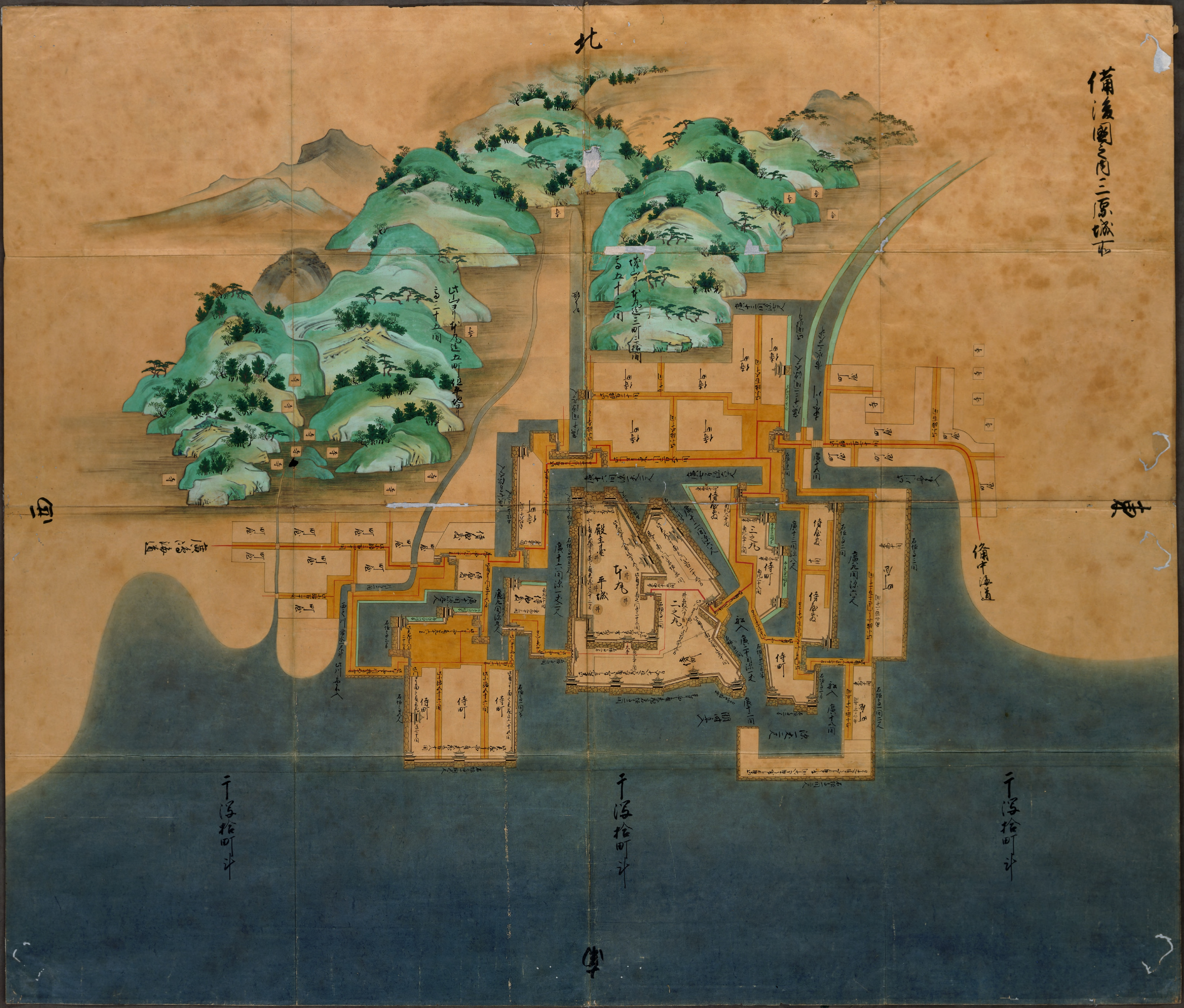
Map of Mihara castle town from 1644.

- Aoki clan (青木氏)
- Hanai clan (花井氏)
- Hattori clan (服部氏)
- Hasegawa clan (長谷川氏)
- Hayashi clan (林氏), descendants of Hayashi Narinaga.
- Honinbō clan (本因坊氏)
- Hori clan (堀氏)
- Ikoma clan (生駒氏)
- Jōoku clan (定屋氏)
- Kanamaru clan (金丸氏)
- Koike clan (小池氏)
- Koizumi clan (小泉氏)
- Kuno clan (久野氏)
- Kurahashi clan (倉橋氏)
- Namikawa clan (並河氏)
- Namiki clan (並木氏)
- Narazaki clan (楢崎氏)
- Nishikawa clan (西川氏)
- Niwa clan (丹羽氏)
- Sawai clan (沢井氏)
- Shimizu clan (清水氏)
- Takakusu clan (高楠氏)
- Takanaka clan (高中氏)
- Toda clan (戸田氏)
- Tsuji clan (辻氏)
- Ueda clan (上田氏)
- Utsonomiya clan (宇都宮氏)
- Waki clan (脇氏)
- Wakimoto clan (脇本氏)
- Watanabe clan (渡辺氏)
- Yasuda clan (安田氏)

== See also ==
- Mihara Castle
- Hiroshima Domain
- Han system
- List of Han
- Asano clan
