= Nansei, Mie =

Town Located in Watarai

Nansei (南勢町, Nansei-chō) was a town located in Watarai District, Mie Prefecture, Japan.

As of 2003, the town had an estimated population of 9,907 and a density of 90.15 persons per km^{2}. The total area was 109.89 km^{2}.

On October 1, 2005, Nansei, along with the town of Nantō (also from Watarai District), was merged to create the town of Minamiise and thus no longer exists as an independent municipality.

It is known, medically, for having a high incidence of Motor Neuron Disease amongst its population; it is one of 3 global "hot spots". Reasons for this are yet unknown.
