= Kisei, Mie =

Dissolved municipality in Mie prefecture, Japan

Kisei (紀勢町, Kisei-chō) was a town located in Watarai District, Mie, Japan.

As of 2003, the town had an estimated population of 4,284 and a density of 62.88 persons per km^{2}. The total area was 68.13 km^{2}.

On February 14, 2005, Kisei, along with the town of Ōmiya, and the village of Ōuchiyama (all from Watarai District), was merged to create the town of Taiki and thus no longer exists as an independent municipality.
