= Watarai =

Watarai 度会町
- Town
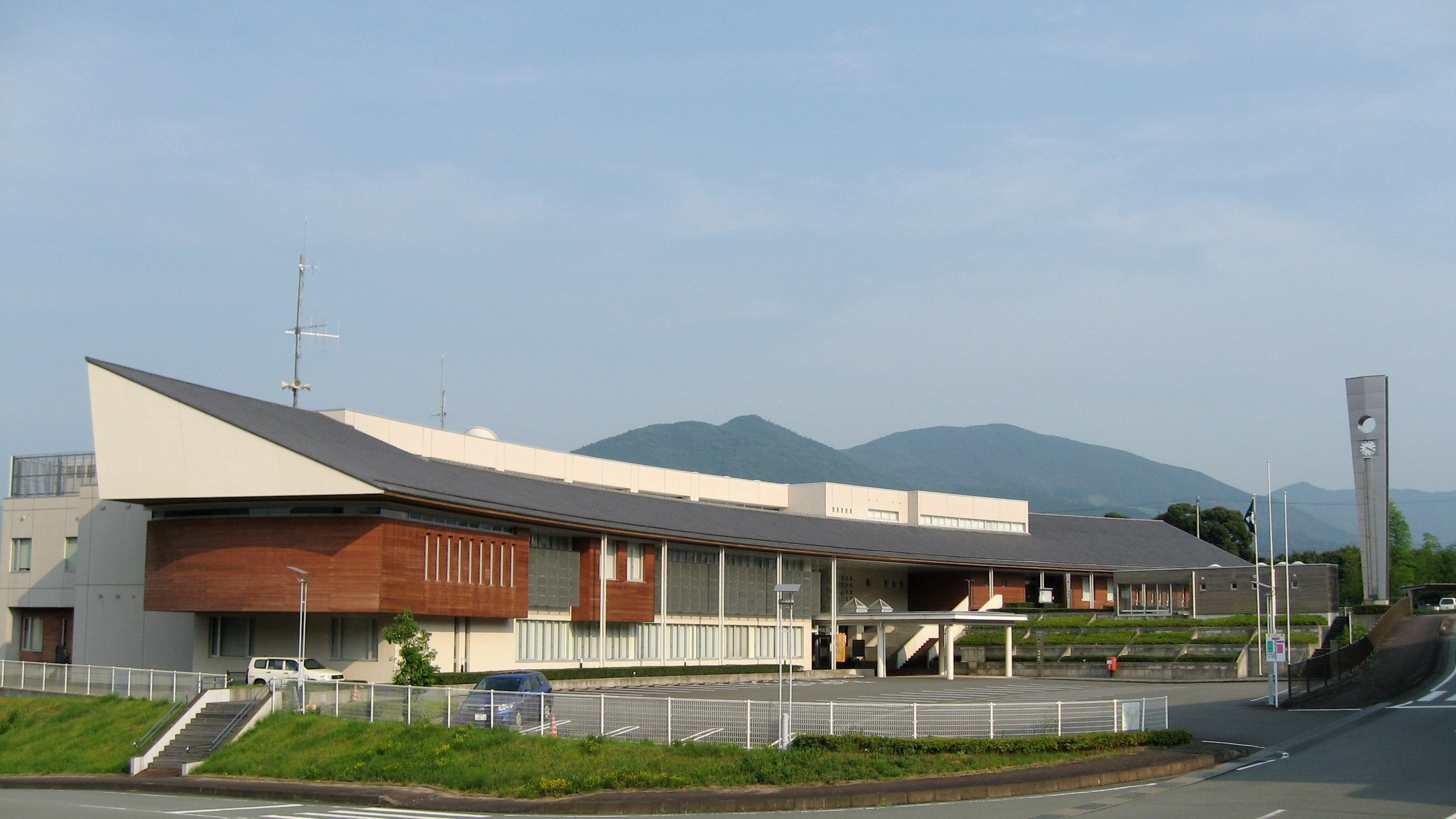
- Watarai town hall

- Flag Seal

- Location of Watarai in Mie Prefecture

- Coordinates: 34°26′N 136°37′E
- Country: Japan
- Region: Kansai
- Prefecture: Mie
- District: Watarai

Area
  - Total: 134.97 km^{2} (52.11 sq mi)

Population (May 31, 2021)
  - Total: 7,928
  - Density: 58.74/km^{2} (152.1/sq mi)
- Time zone: UTC+9 (Japan Standard Time)
- Phone number: 0596-52-7111
- Address: 1215-1 Tanahashi, Watarai-chō, Watarai-gun, Mie-ken 516-2103
- Website: Official website

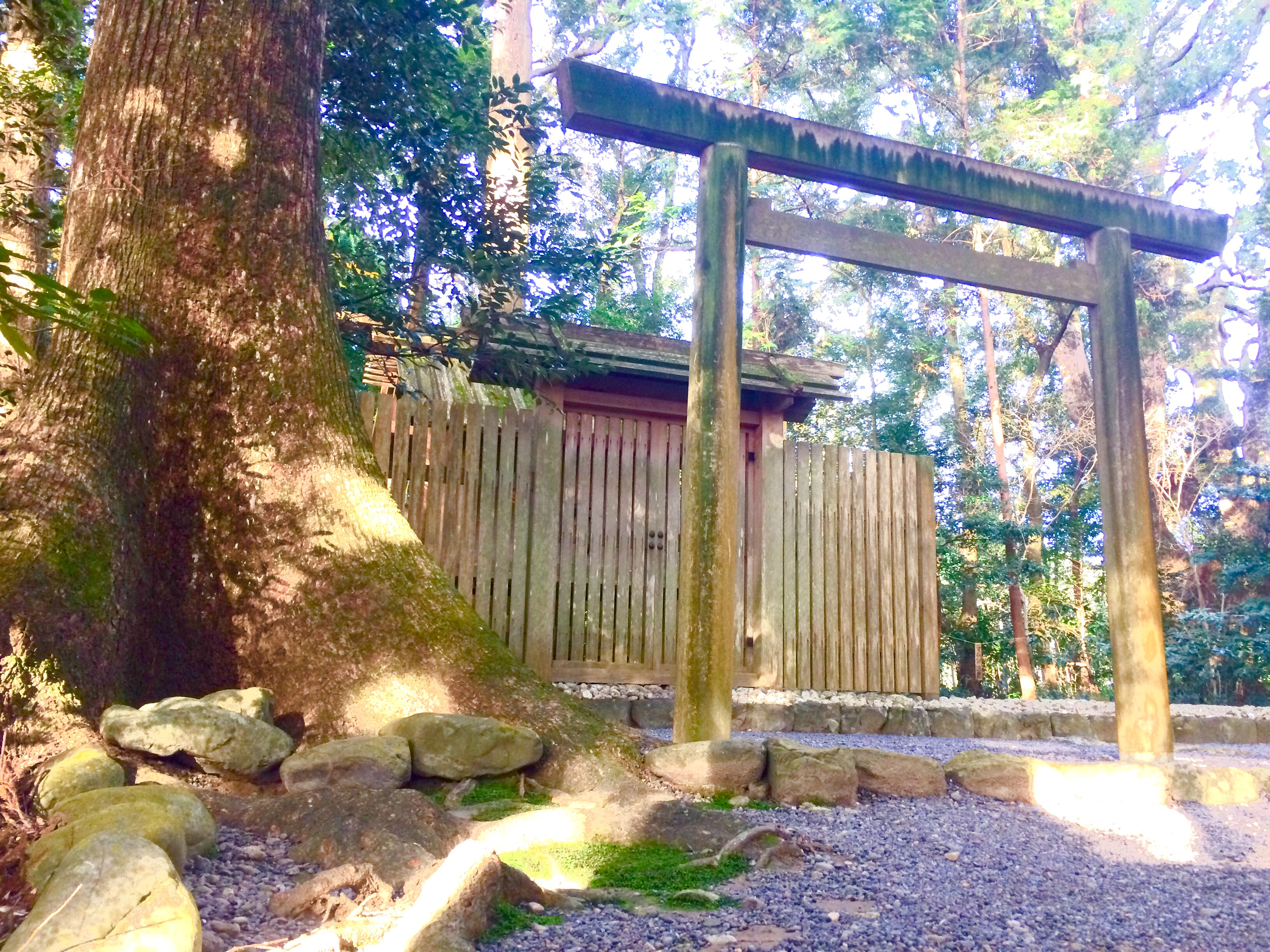
Kugutsuhime-jinja

Watarai (度会町, Watarai-chō) is a town in Watarai District, Mie Prefecture, Japan. As of 31 May 2021, the town had an estimated population of 7,928 in 3068 households and a population density of 59 persons per km^{2}. The total area of the town was 134.97 square kilometres (52.11 sq mi).

== Geography ==
Watarai is an inland municipality, located in eastern Kii Peninsula, near the geographic center of Mie Prefecture.

== Climate ==
Watarai has a humid subtropical climate (Köppen Cfa) characterized by warm summers and cool winters with light to no snowfall. The average annual temperature in Watarai is 15.2 °C. The average annual rainfall is 2015 mm with September as the wettest month. The temperatures are highest on average in August, at around 25.8 °C, and lowest in January, at around 4.8 °C.

== Demographics ==
The population of Watarai has remained stable over the last century.

Historical population
Year	Pop.	±%
1920	8,696	—
1930	8,509	−2.2%
1940	8,772	+3.1%
1950	10,402	+18.6%
1960	9,383	−9.8%
1970	8,323	−11.3%
1980	8,730	+4.9%
1990	9,075	+4.0%
2000	9,218	+1.6%
2010	8,699	−5.6%

== History ==
The area of Watarai was part of ancient Ago District of Shima Province and was transferred to Ise Province in 1582. The villages of Ogawago, Uchikida, Ichinose, and Nakagawa were established within Watarai District, Mie Prefecture with the creation of the modern municipalities system on April 1, 1889. Watarai Village was established on April 1, 1955, through the merger of these four villages. Watarai was elevated to town status on January 1, 1968.

== Government ==
Watarai has a mayor-council form of government with a directly elected mayor and a unicameral town council of 11 members. Watarai, collectively with the other municipalities of Watarai District, contributes two members to the Mie Prefectural Assembly. In terms of national politics, the town is part of Mie 4th district of the lower house of the Diet of Japan.

== Economy ==
The town serves as a commercial center for the surrounding region.

== Education ==
Watarai has one public middle school operated by the town government and one public high school operated by the Mie Prefectural Board of Education. The town does not have an elementary school. Mie Prefecture also operates one special education school for the handicapped.

== Transportation ==
Watarai is not served by any passenger rail service, nor does any national highway pass through the town.
