= Taiki, Mie =

Taiki 大紀町
- Town
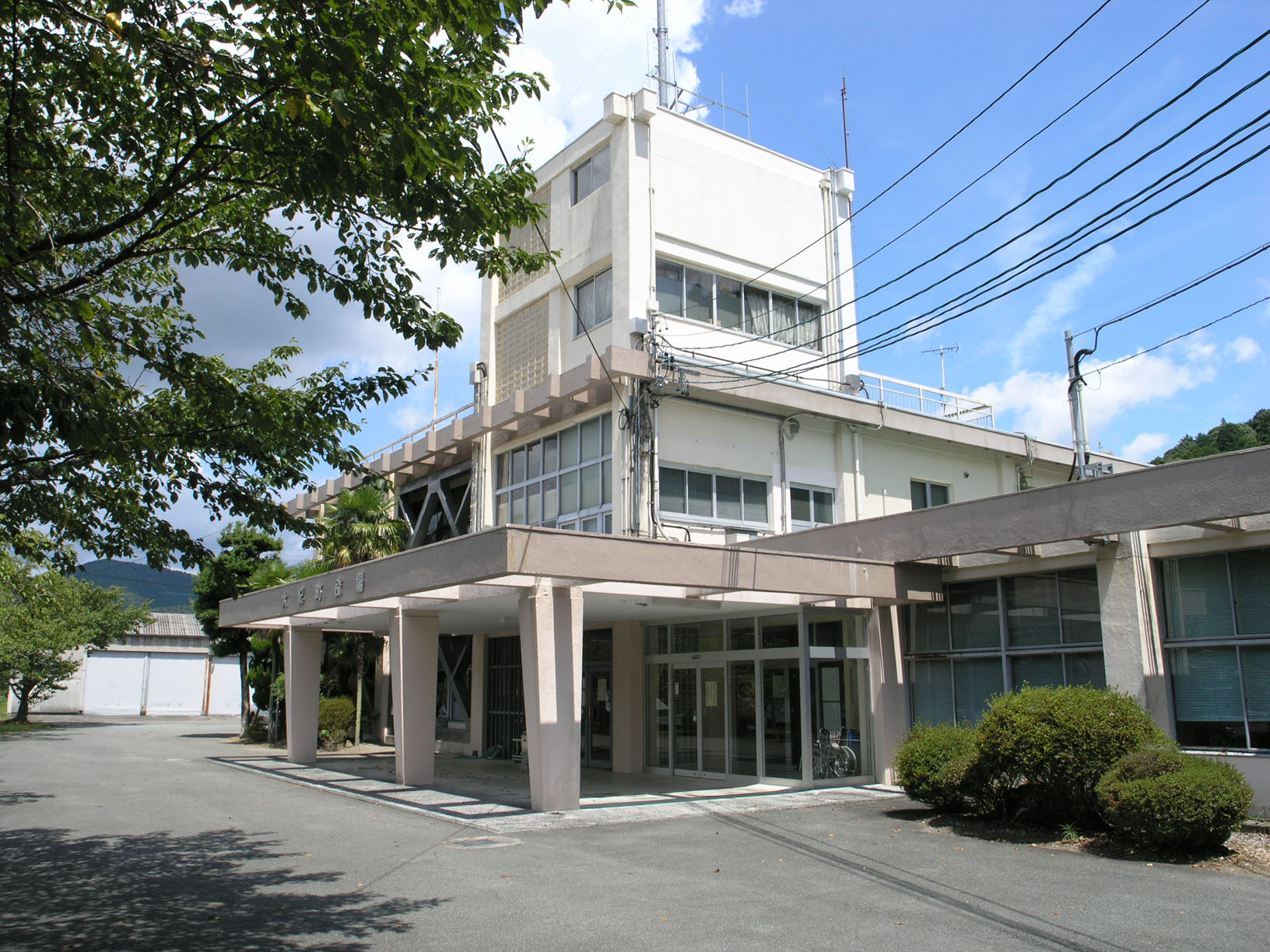
- Taiki town hall

- Flag Emblem

- Location of Taiki in Mie Prefecture

- Coordinates: 34°21′N 136°25′E
- Country: Japan
- Region: Kansai
- Prefecture: Mie
- District: Watarai

Area
  - Total: 233.54 km^{2} (90.17 sq mi)

Population (July 2021)
  - Total: 7,934
  - Density: 33.97/km^{2} (87.99/sq mi)
- Time zone: UTC+9 (Japan Standard Time)
- Tree: Maki
- Flower: Cherry blossom
- Phone number: 0598-86-2212
- Address: 1610-1 Takihara, Taiki-chō, Watarai-gun, Mie-ken 519-2703
- Website: Official website

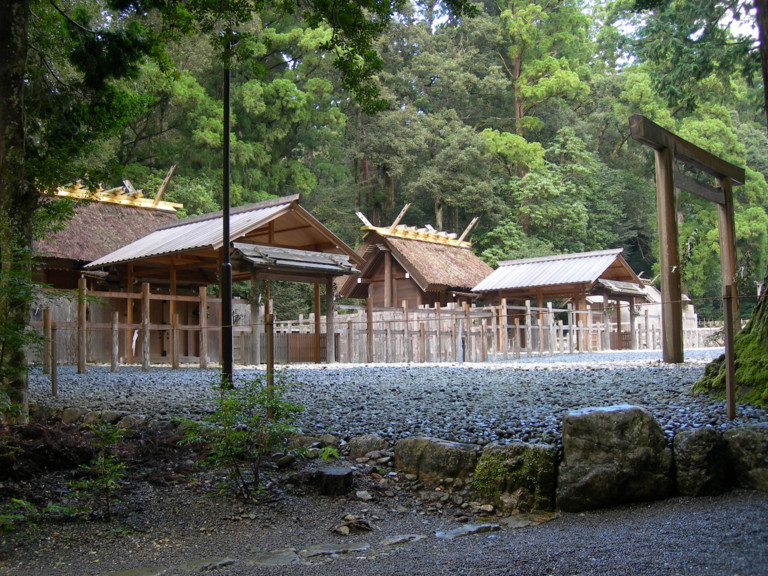
Takihara-no-miya Shinto shrine in Taiki

Taiki (大紀町, Taiki-chō) is a town located in Watarai District, Mie Prefecture, Japan. As of 1 August 2021, the town had an estimated population of 7,934 in 3903 households and a population density of 34 persons per km^{2}. The total area of the town was 233.54 square kilometres (90.17 sq mi).

== Geography ==
Taiki is located in eastern Kii Peninsula, in south-central Mie Prefecture. The town is bordered by Ise Bay to the east.

== Climate ==
Taiki has a humid subtropical climate (Köppen Cfa) characterized by warm summers and cool winters with light to no snowfall. The average annual temperature in Taiki is 14.9 °C. The average annual rainfall is 2229 mm with September as the wettest month. The temperatures are highest on average in August, at around 25.2 °C, and lowest in January, at around 4.7 °C.

== Demographics ==
The population of Taiki has decreased steadily over the past 70 years and is now much less than it was a century ago.

Historical population
Year	Pop.	±%
1920	14,525	—
1930	14,660	+0.9%
1940	15,202	+3.7%
1950	19,336	+27.2%
1960	17,294	−10.6%
1970	14,754	−14.7%
1980	14,114	−4.3%
1990	12,580	−10.9%
2000	11,334	−9.9%
2010	9,849	−13.1%

== History ==
A portion of the area of present-day Taiki was part of ancient Shima Province, but was transferred to Kii Province in 1582; the remainder was part of Ise Province. During the Edo period, large-scale forestry projects were begun. After the Meiji restoration, the area became part of Mie Prefecture. The village of Takihara was established with the creation of the modern municipalities system on April 1, 1889. It was raised to town status in 1940 and merged with the neighboring village of Shippo in 1956 to form the town of Ōmiya. Taiki was formed on February 14, 2005, with the merger of Ōmiya with the neighboring town of Kisei and the village of Ōuchiyama.

== Government ==
Taiki has a mayor-council form of government with a directly elected mayor and a unicameral city council of 11 members. Taiki contributes two members to the Mie Prefectural Assembly. In terms of national politics, the town is part of Mie 4th district of the lower house of the Diet of Japan.

== Economy ==
The town serves as a commercial center for the surrounding region. Commercial fishing and the dairy industry play important roles in the local economy.

== Education ==
Due to the steadily decreasing population and how wide the territory of Taiki expands, there are now only three public elementary schools and one public middle school operated by the town government. The town does not have a high school.

Before the merger of various towns and villages that created Taiki, the smaller towns and villages had their own schools that have mostly since closed. Some of those school buildings remain standing but closed, such as in Nishiki, while others have been repressed, such as the Aso elementary school which is now an onsen (public bath).

== Transportation ==
=== Railway ===
JR Tōkai – Kisei Main Line

- Aso - Ise-Kashiwazaki - Ōuchiyama - Umegadani

=== Highway ===
- Kisei Expressway
- National Route 42}
- National Route 260
