= Kuno clan =

Japanese clan

Kuno clan 久野
- Kuno clan mon
- Home province: Tōtōmi
- Parent house: Fujiwara clan Kudō clan
- Titles: various
- Founder: Kuno Munenaka
- Final ruler: Kuno Sumitaka
- Founding year: 13th century
- Ruled until: 1868 (Meiji Restoration)

The Kuno clan (Japanese: 久野氏, Hepburn: Kuno-shi) was a Japanese samurai clan who were a prominent Jizamurai (国人 kokujin) family of Tōtōmi Province during the Muromachi period and Sengoku period. They first served the Imagawa clan (今川氏) for generations but later became retainers of Tokugawa Ieyasu. The surname is sometimes written as "久努", "久奴" or "久能".

== Origins ==
Early in the Kamakura period, Kuno Munenaka (久野宗仲) moved to Kuno, Tōtōmi Province and took the place name as his surname founding the Kuno clan. There are several different genealogies of the Kuno clan and it is unknown which is the correct one. In most cases they descend from the Southern House of the Fujiwara clan (藤原南家 Fujiwara Nanke).

=== Fujiwara Nanke ===
The Kuno clan of Tōtōmi Province was a branch of the Kudō clan (工藤氏) which descended from the Southern House of the Fujiwara clan (藤原南家 Fujiwara Nanke). The founder of Fujiwara's Southern House was Fujiwara no Muchimaro (680–737). His fifth generation great-grandson, Fujiwara no Tamenori (藤原為憲), founded the Kudō clan. In this genealogy the founder of the Kuno clan, Kuno Munenaka (久野宗仲), is a son of Kudō Kiyonaka (工藤清仲).

=== Hata clan ===
Another theory is that the Kuno are descendants of the Hata clan (秦氏), an immigrant family who claimed descent from the first Emperor of China, Qin Shi Huang.

=== Another theory ===
In the Seishi-kakei-daijiten (姓氏家系大辞典) family compilation it is in fact recorded that the Kuno clan descend from Kuno Nao (久奴直).

== Clan Heads ==
Order	Name	Japanese	Lifetime	Titles/AKA	Lineage
1	Kuno Munenaka	久野宗仲	? – ?	Kudō Munenaka (工藤宗仲)	son of Kudō Kiyonaka (工藤清仲)
2	Kuno Takakage	久野忠景	? – ?	also Tadamune (忠宗)	son of #1
3	Kuno Kiyomune	久野清宗	? – ?		son of #2
4	Kuno Kiyonari	久野清成	? – ?		son of #3
5	Kuno Munemasa	久野宗政	? – ?		son of #4
6	Kuno Saburōuemon	久野三郎右衛門	? – ?		son of #5
7	Kuno Tadakiyo	久野忠清	? – ?		son of #6
8	Kuno Munehiro	久野宗弘	? – ?		son of #7
9	Kuno Tadamune	久野忠宗	? – ?	also Munetaka (宗隆)	son of #8
10	Kuno Motomune	久野元宗	? –1560		son of #9
11	Kuno Muneyoshi	久野宗能	1527–1609		younger brother of #10
12	Kuno Munenari	久野宗成	1582–1625	Ju-goi-no-ge (Junior Fifth Rank, Lower Grade 従五位下), Tanba-no-kami (丹波守)	grandson of #11
13	Kuno Muneharu	久野宗晴	1609–1649	Ju-goi-no-ge (Junior Fifth Rank, Lower Grade 従五位下)	son of #12
14	Kuno Munetoshi	久野宗俊	1643–1706	Ju-goi-no-ge (Junior Fifth Rank, Lower Grade 従五位下), Tanba-no-kami (丹波守), Izumi-no-kami (和泉守)	son of #13
15	Kuno Toshimasa	久野俊正	1674–1726	Ju-goi-no-ge (Junior Fifth Rank, Lower Grade 従五位下), Izumi-no-kami (和泉守), Bingo-no-kami (備後守)	son of #14
16	Kuno Toshizumi	久野俊純	1705–1772	Ju-goi-no-ge (Junior Fifth Rank, Lower Grade 従五位下), Tanba-no-kami (丹波守), 号華峯	son of #15
17	Kuno Teruzumi	久野輝純	1745–1811	Ju-goi-no-ge (Junior Fifth Rank, Lower Grade 従五位下), Izumi-no-kami (和泉守), Ōmi-no-kami (近江守)	son of #16
18	Kuno Masazumi	久野昌純	1787–1823		son of #17
19	Kuno Zumikata	久野純固	1815–1873	Ju-goi-no-ge (Junior Fifth Rank, Lower Grade 従五位下), Tanba-no-kami (丹波守)	son of #18

== See also ==
- Fujiwara clan
- Nanke (Fujiwara)
- Hata clan
- Mihara Domain
