= Minamiise, Mie =

Minamiise 南伊勢町
- Town
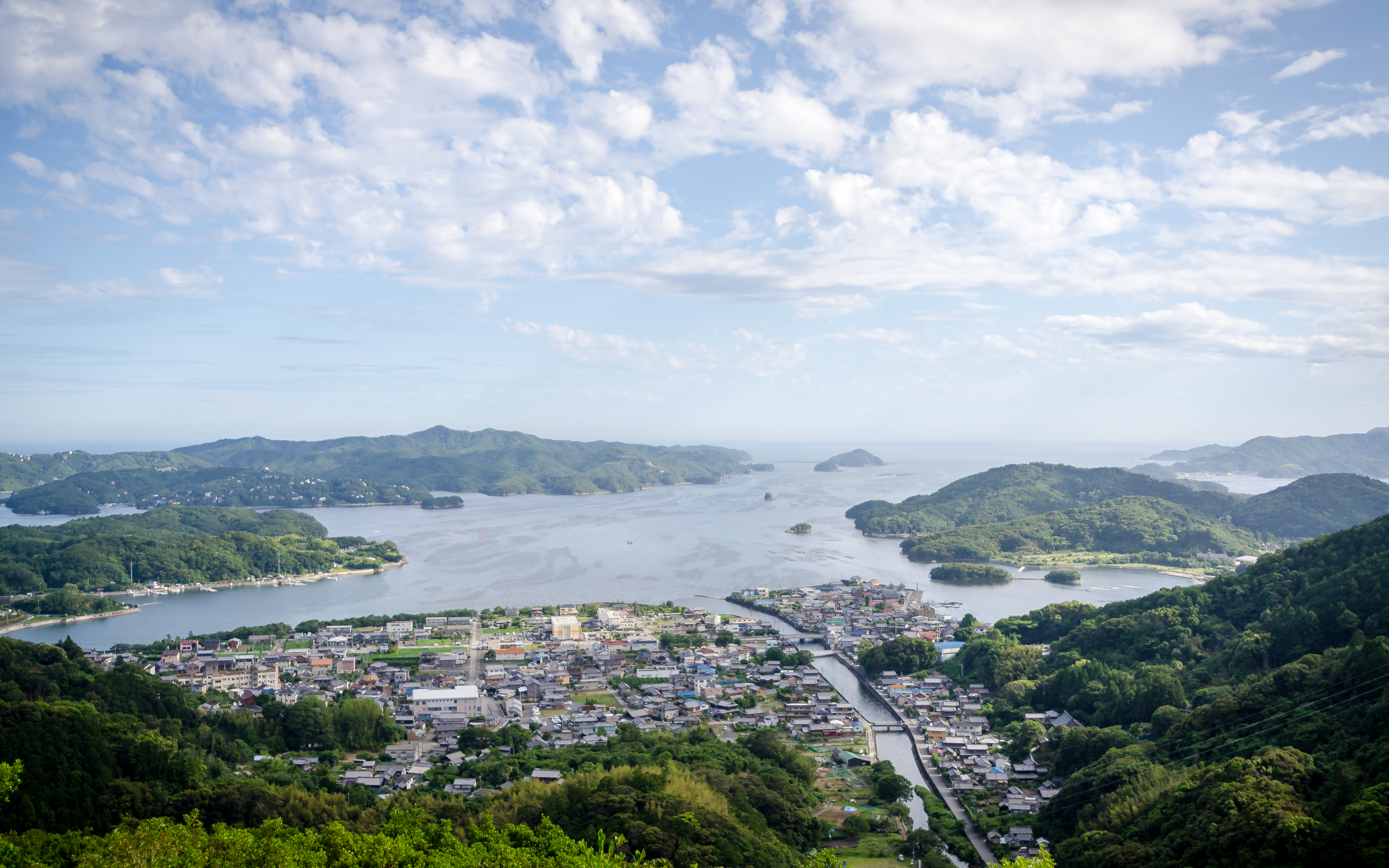
- Gokasho Bay (五ヶ所湾）)

- Flag Seal
- Motto(s): "海、山と風がそよぐ自然豊かなまち"; Translation: A Town with Plentiful Nature and Ocean and Mountains Rustled by the Wind
- Location of Miniamiise in Mie Prefecture ♦ = City ♦ = Town

- Coordinates: 34°21′N 136°42′E
- Country: Japan
- Region: Kansai
- Prefecture: Mie
- District: Watarai

Government
  - Mayor: Takumi Koyama

Area
  - Total: 242.98 km^{2} (93.82 sq mi)

Population (August 2021)
  - Total: 11,745
  - Density: 48.337/km^{2} (125.19/sq mi)
- Time zone: UTC+9 (Japan Standard Time)
- Phone number: 0599-66-1111
- Address: Gokashoura, Minamiise-cho, Watarai-gun, Mie Prefecture 516-0194
- Climate: Cfa
- Website: Official website
- Symbols
- Fish: Red Seabream
- Flower: Sakura
- Tree: Mikan (Satsuma Orange)

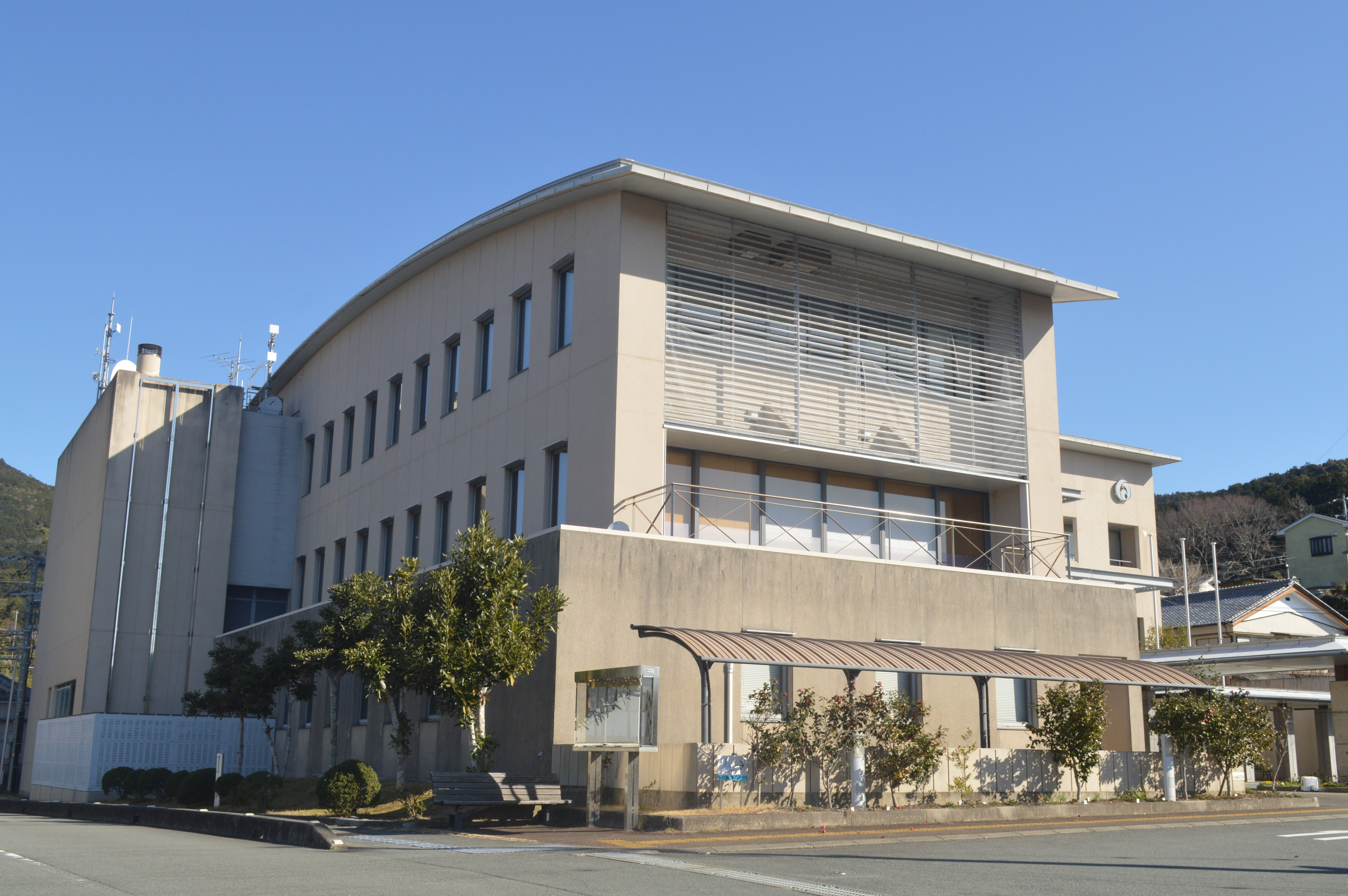
Minamiise Town Hall

Minamiise (南伊勢町, Minamiise-chō) is a town located in Watarai District, Mie Prefecture, Japan. As of 1 August 2021, the town had an estimated population of 11,745 in 5752 households and a population density of 48 persons per km^{2}. The total area of the town was 241.89 square kilometres (93.39 sq mi).

== Geography ==
Minamiise occupies a ria coastal region with numerous deeply indented bays located in the eastern part of the Kii Peninsula in central Mie Prefecture, along the Kumano Sea. Parts of Minamiise are inside Ise-Shima National Park.

=== Climate ===
Minamiise has a humid subtropical climate (Köppen Cfa) characterized by warm summers and cool winters with light to no snowfall. The average annual temperature in Minamiise is 15.9 °C (60.6 °F). The average annual rainfall is 2,273.5 mm (89.51 in) with September as the wettest month. The temperatures are highest on average in August, at around 26.7 °C (80.1 °F), and lowest in January, at around 5.9 °C (42.6 °F).

Climate data for Minamiise (1991−2020 normals, extremes 1979−present)
Month	Jan	Feb	Mar	Apr	May	Jun	Jul	Aug	Sep	Oct	Nov	Dec	Year
Record high °C (°F)	19.3 (66.7)	21.2 (70.2)	24.5 (76.1)	27.4 (81.3)	30.9 (87.6)	34.8 (94.6)	39.1 (102.4)	38.3 (100.9)	35.3 (95.5)	31.8 (89.2)	25.3 (77.5)	24.4 (75.9)	39.1 (102.4)
Mean daily maximum °C (°F)	10.2 (50.4)	11.1 (52.0)	14.3 (57.7)	19.1 (66.4)	23.0 (73.4)	25.7 (78.3)	29.4 (84.9)	30.8 (87.4)	27.9 (82.2)	23.0 (73.4)	17.8 (64.0)	12.8 (55.0)	20.4 (68.8)
Daily mean °C (°F)	5.9 (42.6)	6.4 (43.5)	9.4 (48.9)	14.0 (57.2)	18.2 (64.8)	21.6 (70.9)	25.5 (77.9)	26.7 (80.1)	23.7 (74.7)	18.6 (65.5)	13.2 (55.8)	8.2 (46.8)	15.9 (60.7)
Mean daily minimum °C (°F)	1.6 (34.9)	1.8 (35.2)	4.5 (40.1)	8.9 (48.0)	13.5 (56.3)	18.0 (64.4)	22.3 (72.1)	23.3 (73.9)	20.3 (68.5)	14.8 (58.6)	8.7 (47.7)	3.5 (38.3)	11.8 (53.2)
Record low °C (°F)	−5.8 (21.6)	−4.9 (23.2)	−3.8 (25.2)	−1.2 (29.8)	4.6 (40.3)	10.3 (50.5)	14.9 (58.8)	15.5 (59.9)	11.6 (52.9)	5.3 (41.5)	−0.3 (31.5)	−3.5 (25.7)	−5.8 (21.6)
Average precipitation mm (inches)	76.7 (3.02)	86.7 (3.41)	160.7 (6.33)	193.3 (7.61)	222.9 (8.78)	256.6 (10.10)	228.7 (9.00)	185.8 (7.31)	379.1 (14.93)	286.0 (11.26)	121.8 (4.80)	75.2 (2.96)	2,273.5 (89.51)
Average precipitation days (≥ 1.0 mm)	5.3	6.3	9.6	9.6	10.9	13.3	11.9	10.0	12.5	11.0	7.1	5.7	113.2
Mean monthly sunshine hours	181.6	172.5	189.5	194.2	193.0	137.6	169.1	203.3	147.0	157.4	163.2	185.6	2,094.2
Source: Japan Meteorological Agency

=== Demographics ===
The population of Minamiise has decreased rapidly over the past 70 years and is now much less the it was a century ago.

Historical population
Year	Pop.	±%
1950	31,508	—
1960	32,071	+1.8%
1970	27,813	−13.3%
1980	23,883	−14.1%
1990	20,933	−12.4%
2000	18,235	−12.9%
2010	14,791	−18.9%

== History ==
The area of Minamiise was once part of the ancient Shima Province, and was transferred to Ise Province in 1582. The village of Gokasho was established with the creation of the modern municipalities system on April 1, 1889. It was raised to town status in 1940. Gokasho merged with the neighboring villages of Honohara, Minami and Shikutaso to form the town of Nansei in 1955. On October 1, 2005, Nansei merged with the town of Nantō to form the town of Minamiise.

== Government ==
Minamiise has a mayor-council form of government with a directly elected mayor and a unicameral city council of 14 members. Minamiise, collectively with the other municipalities in Watari District, contributes two members to the Mie Prefectural Assembly. In terms of national politics, the town is part of Mie 4th district of the lower house of the Diet of Japan.

== Economy ==
The economy of Minamiise is dominated by commercial fishing, including the raising of pearl oysters. Most of the business center around main town centers of Nansei and Nanto.

== Education ==
Minamiise has three public elementary schools and two public middle schools operated by the town government, and one public high school operated by the Mie Prefectural Board of Education.

== Transportation ==
=== Railway ===
- Minamise has no passenger train service.

=== Highway ===
- National Route 260

== Noted people from Minamiise ==
- Kiriko Isono, actress, entertainer
