= Tamaki, Mie =

Tamaki 玉城町
- Town
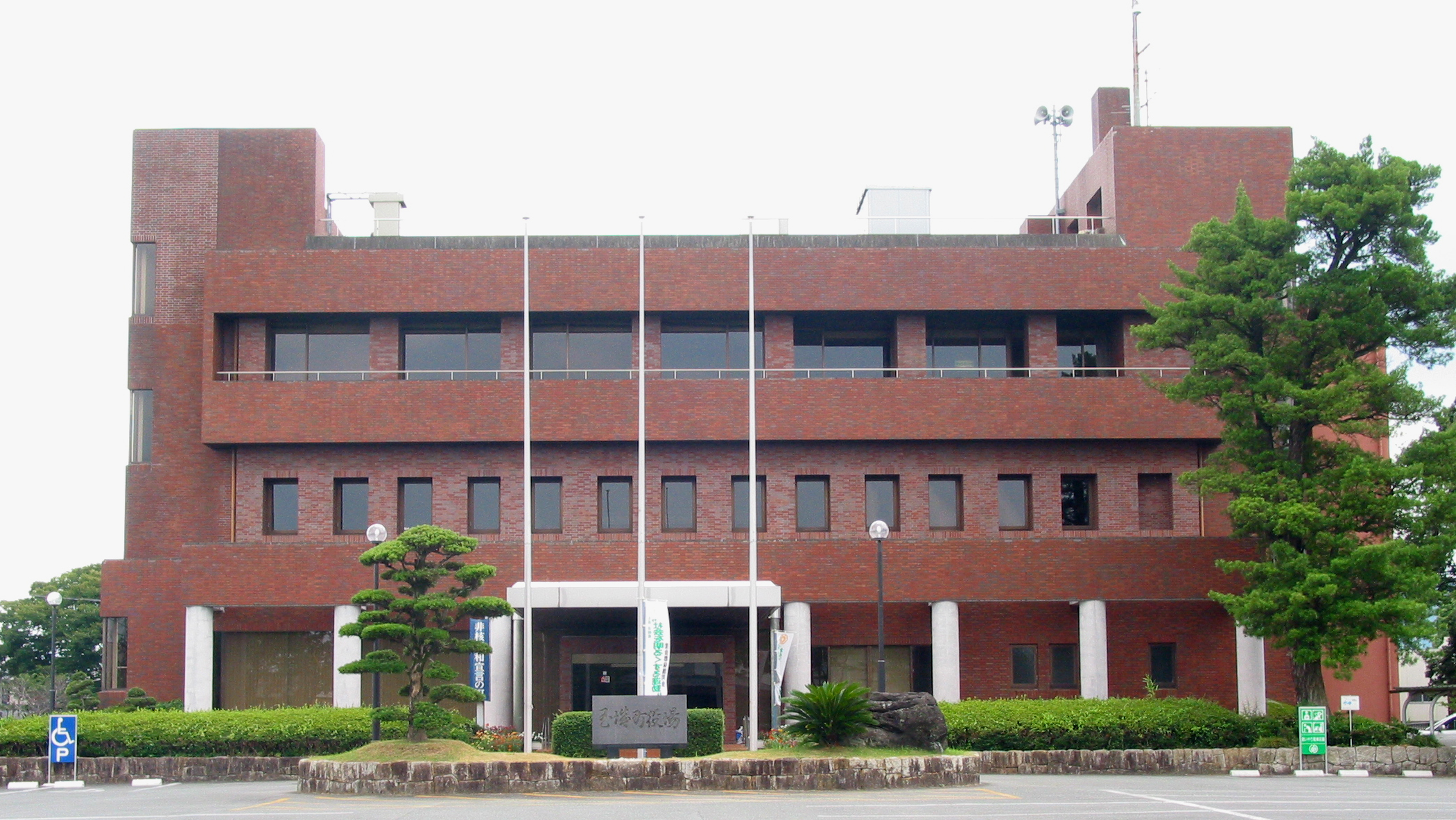
- Tamaki town hall

- Flag Seal

- Location of Tamaki in Mie Prefecture

- Coordinates: 34°29′N 136°38′E
- Country: Japan
- Region: Kansai
- Prefecture: Mie
- District: Watarai

Area
  - Total: 40.94 km^{2} (15.81 sq mi)

Population (July 31, 2021)
  - Total: 15,353
  - Density: 375.0/km^{2} (971.3/sq mi)
- Time zone: UTC+9 (Japan Standard Time)
- Tree: Maki
- Flower: Cherry blossom
- Phone number: 0596-58-8200
- Address: 114-2 Tamaru, Tamaki-chō, Watarai-gun, Mie-ken 519-0495
- Website: Official website

Tamaki (玉城町, Tamaki-chō) is a town located in Watarai District, Mie Prefecture, Japan. As of 31 July 2021, the town had an estimated population of 15,353 in 5,844 households and a population density of 380 persons per km^{2}. The total area of the town was 40.94 square kilometres (15.81 sq mi).

== Geography ==
Tamaki is an inland municipality, located in eastern Kii Peninsula, near the geographic center of Mie Prefecture. Springtime in Tamaki-chō features cherry blossoms, rice fields, persimmon trees, nurseries and vegetable fields growing daikon, cabbage and more. There are many forests which have been designated as wildlife protection areas.

== Climate ==
Tamaki has a humid subtropical climate (Köppen Cfa) characterized by warm summers and cool winters with light to no snowfall. The average annual temperature in Tamaki is 15.5 °C. The average annual rainfall is 1856 mm with September as the wettest month. The temperatures are highest on average in August, at around 26.3 °C, and lowest in January, at around 5.1 °C.

== Demographics ==
The population of Tamaki has increased steadily over the past 60 years.

Historical population
Year	Pop.	±%
1960	10,786	—
1970	10,482	−2.8%
1980	11,643	+11.1%
1990	12,348	+6.1%
2000	14,284	+15.7%
2010	15,300	+7.1%

== History ==
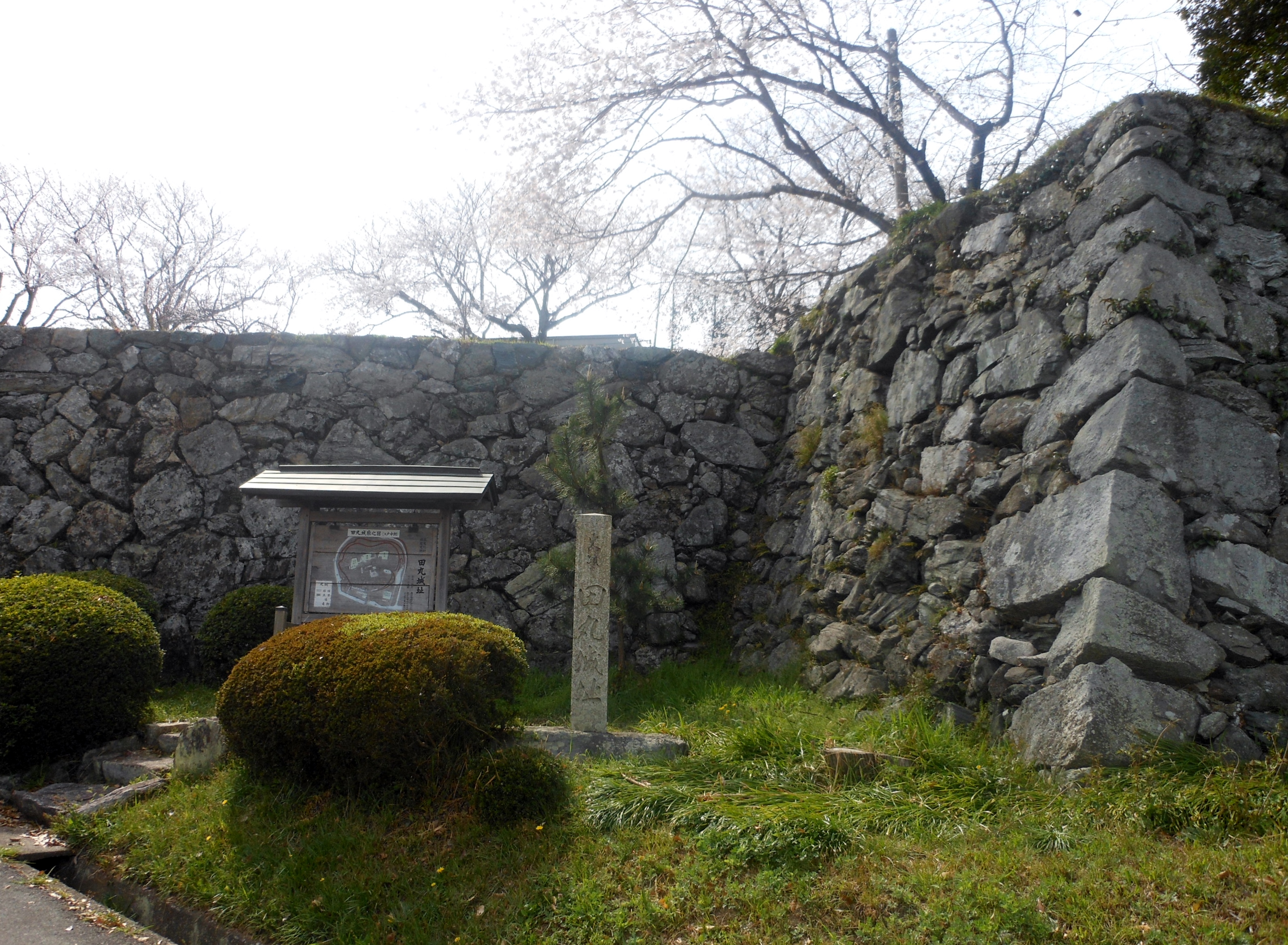
Tamaru Castle Site in Spring 2013

The area of present-day Tamaki was part of ancient Shima Province, but was transferred to Ise Province in 1582. Tamaki was the site of a Sengoku period Japanese castle, Tamaru Castle, which dominated the surrounding area, including access to the Ise Grand Shrines. The castle was initially built by Kitabatake Chikafusa of the Kitabatake Clan in 1336, to serve as a base of operations for Emperor Go-Daigo's Southern Court during the conflict between the Northern and Southern Court known as the Nanboku-chō period. The castle was destroyed in the early Meiji period.

Tamaru Town was created within Watarai District of Mie Prefecture with the establishment of the modern municipalities system on April 1, 1889. It merged with the neighboring village of Higashitokida and assumed its present name on April 10, 1955.

== Government ==
Tamaki has a mayor-council form of government with a directly elected mayor and a unicameral city council of 13 members. Tamaki, collectively with the other municipalities of Watari District, contributes two members to the Mie Prefectural Assembly. In terms of national politics, the town is part of Mie 4th district of the lower house of the Diet of Japan.

== Economy ==
The town serves as a commercial center for the surrounding region. "Tamaki Pork" is a local speciality.

== Education ==
Tamaki has four public elementary schools and one public middle school operated by the town government. The town does not have a high school. There is one special education school for the handicapped operated by the Mie Prefectural Board of Education.

== Transportation ==
=== Railway ===
JR Tōkai – Sangū Line

- Tamaru

=== Highway ===
- Ise Expressway

== Sister cities ==
- (Japan) Nanjō, Okinawa, since 1993
