= Watarai District =

District in Mie prefecture, Japan

Coordinates: 34°20′56″N 136°29′38″E

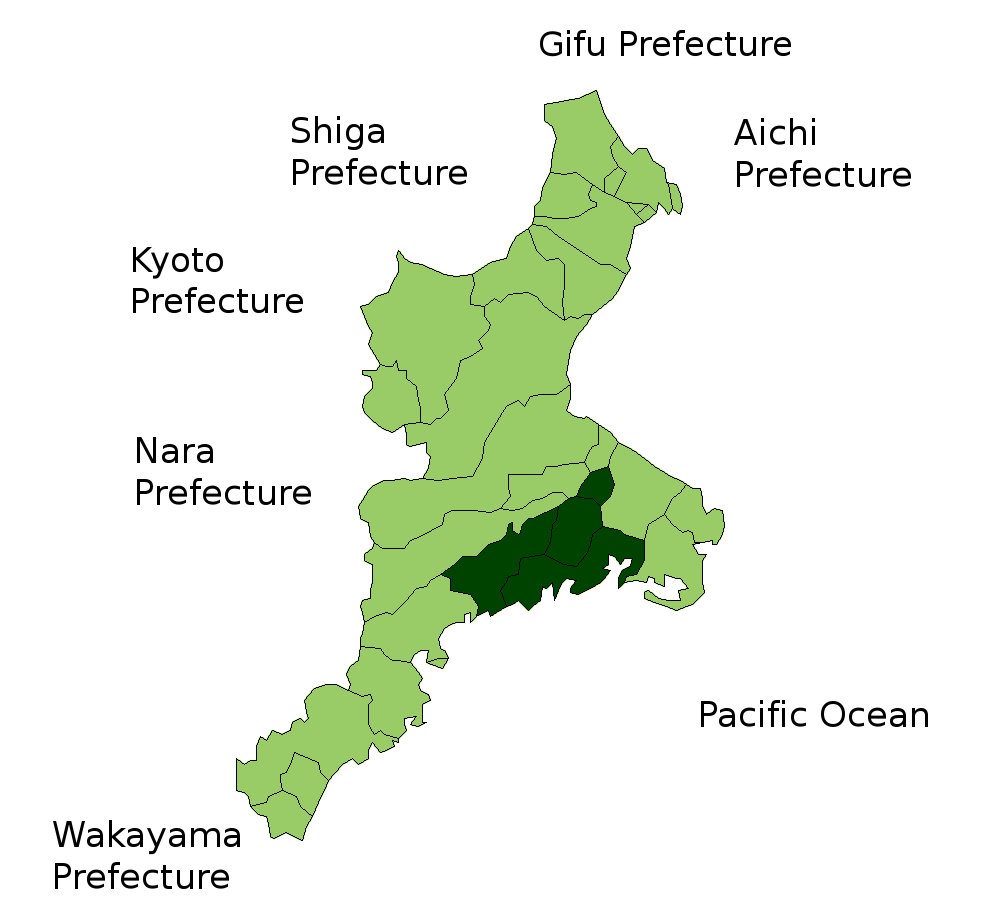
Map of modern Watarai District as of 2012

Watarai District (度会郡, Watarai-gun) is a rural district located in Mie Prefecture, Japan. As of September 1, 2012, the district has an estimated population of 47,309 and a population density of 72.5 persons/km^{2}. The total area is 652.43 km^{2}.

== Towns and villages ==
- Minamiise (南伊勢町, Minamiise-chō)
- Taiki (大紀町, Taiki-chō)
- Tamaki (玉城町Tamaki-chō)
- Watarai (度会町, Watarai-chō)

== History ==
Watarai District was one of the traditional counties of former Ise Province, with the exception of portions of Minamiise, which were part of Shima Province until the Sengoku period. Modern Watarai District was established within Mie Prefecture on April 1, 1889 during the Meiji period establishment of municipalities, and was initially organized into four towns and 31 villages. Most of modern Ise and part of Shima cities were formerly part of Watarai District. Through consolidations and mergers, this was reduced to eight towns and two villages by the start of 2005.

On February 14, 2005, the towns of Kisei and Ōmiya and the village of Ōuchiyama merged to form the new town of Taiki. On October 1, 2005. the towns of Nansei and Nantō merged to form the new town of Minamiise. This was followed on November 1 of the same year, when the towns of Futami and Obata, and village of Misono merged with city of Ise, leaving the district with its present four towns.
