= Kihoku, Mie =

Kihoku 紀北町
- Town
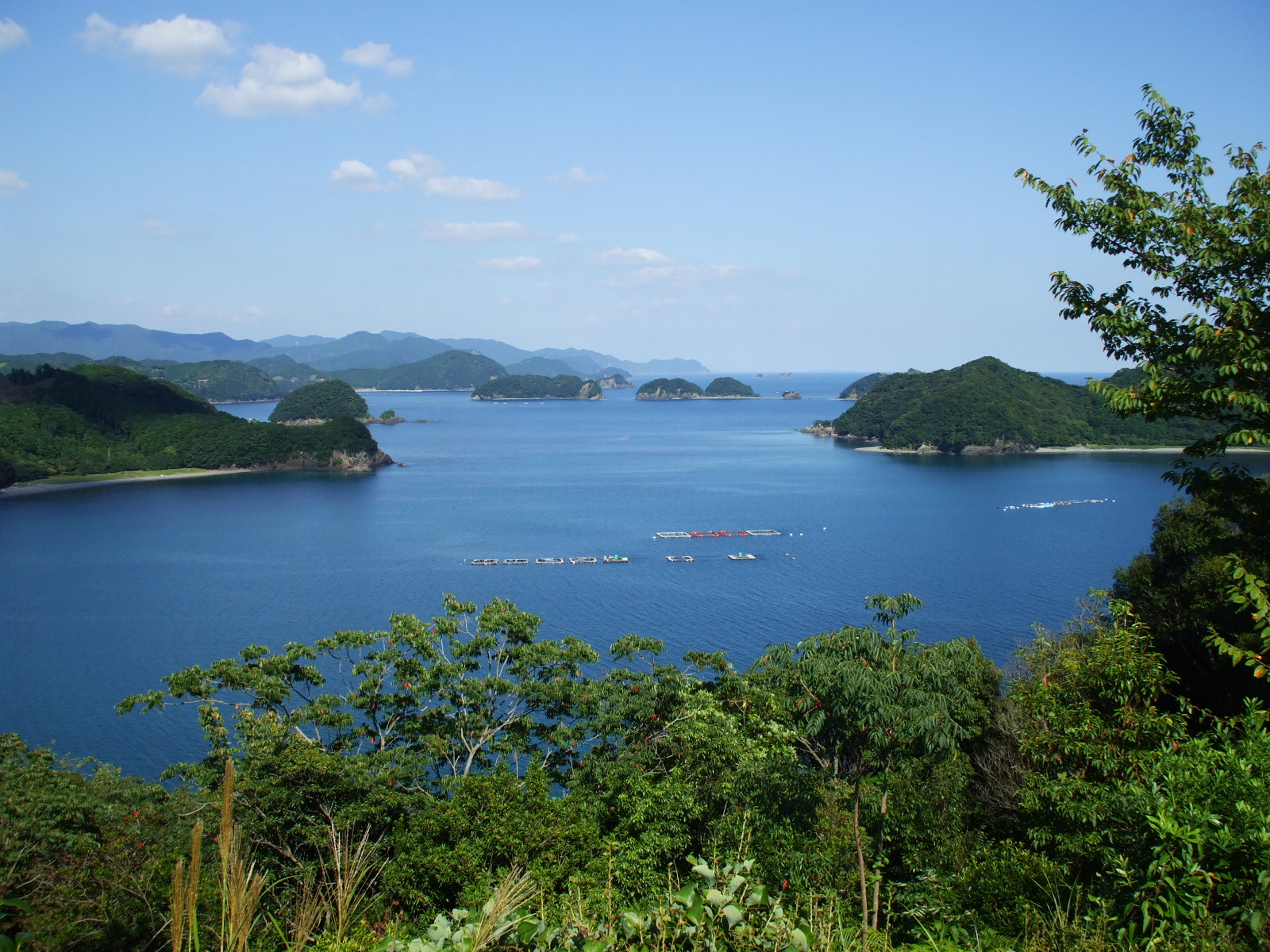
- Kumano Bay in Kihoku

- Flag Seal

- Location of Kihoku in Mie Prefecture

- Coordinates: 34°12′41″N 136°20′14″E
- Country: Japan
- Region: Kansai
- Prefecture: Mie
- District: Kitamuro

Area
  - Total: 257.01 km^{2} (99.23 sq mi)

Population (June 2021)
  - Total: 15,077
  - Density: 58.663/km^{2} (151.94/sq mi)
- Time zone: UTC+9 (Japan Standard Time)
- Phone number: 0597-32-3901
- Address: 495-8 Aikga, Kihoku-chō, Kitamuro-gun, Mie-ken 519-5701
- Climate: Cfa
- Website: Official website
- Symbols
- Bird: Japanese murrelet
- Fish: Ocean sunfish
- Flower: Japanese lily
- Tree: Hinoki

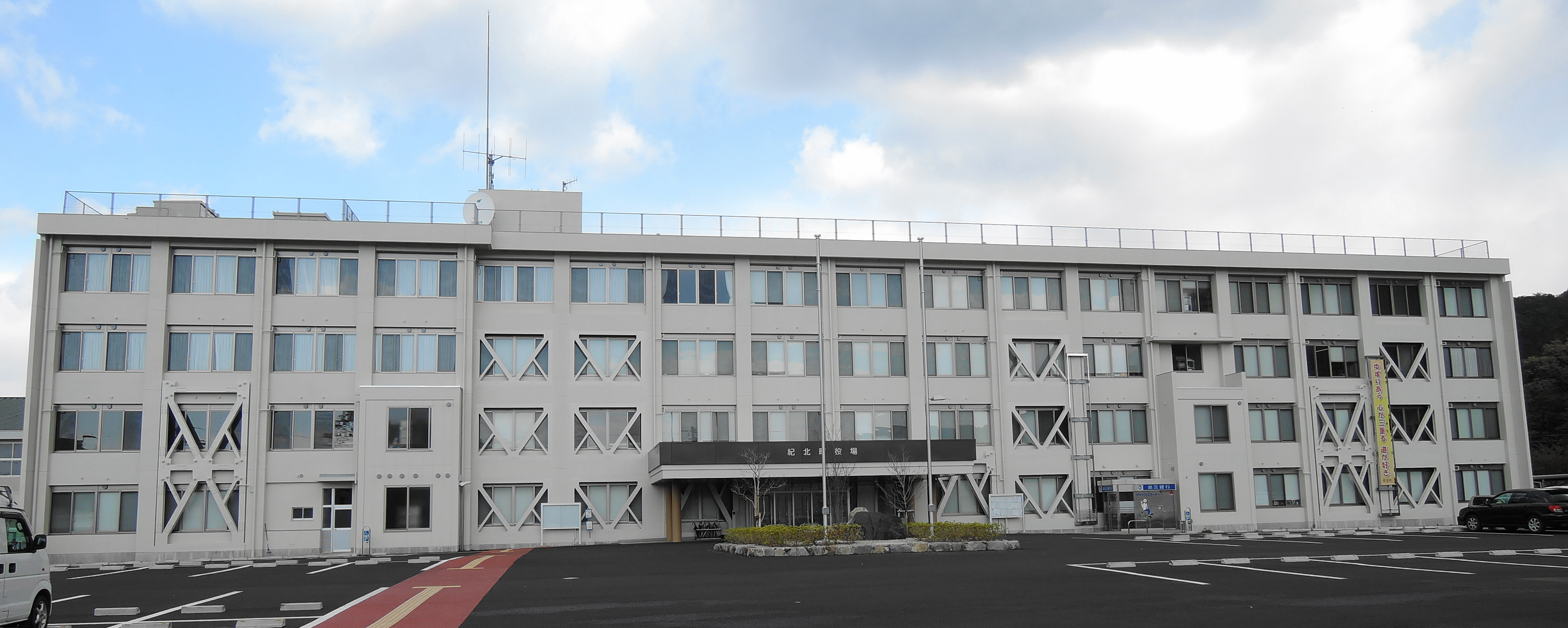
Kihoku Town Hall

Kihoku (紀北町, Kihoku-chō) is a town located in Mie Prefecture, Japan. As of 1 August 2021, the town had an estimated population of 15,077 in 7876 households and a population density of 59 persons per km^{2}. The total area of the town was 257.01 square kilometres (99.23 sq mi).

== Geography ==
Kihoku is located in southeastern the Kii Peninsula in southern Mie Prefecture, facing the Pacific Ocean.

=== Climate ===
Kihoku has a humid subtropical climate (Köppen Cfa) characterized by warm summers and cool winters with light to no snowfall. The average annual temperature in Kihoku is 16.1 °C (61.0 °F). The average annual rainfall is 2,670.2 mm (105.13 in) with September as the wettest month. The temperatures are highest on average in August, at around 26.5 °C (79.7 °F), and lowest in January, at around 6.2 °C (43.2 °F).

Climate data for Kihoku (1991−2020 normals, extremes 1979−present)
Month	Jan	Feb	Mar	Apr	May	Jun	Jul	Aug	Sep	Oct	Nov	Dec	Year
Record high °C (°F)	20.1 (68.2)	23.2 (73.8)	26.2 (79.2)	31.8 (89.2)	31.7 (89.1)	36.4 (97.5)	37.8 (100.0)	39.1 (102.4)	36.7 (98.1)	31.7 (89.1)	27.1 (80.8)	25.4 (77.7)	39.1 (102.4)
Mean daily maximum °C (°F)	11.3 (52.3)	12.2 (54.0)	15.2 (59.4)	19.7 (67.5)	23.2 (73.8)	25.8 (78.4)	29.6 (85.3)	30.9 (87.6)	28.2 (82.8)	23.6 (74.5)	18.8 (65.8)	13.7 (56.7)	21.0 (69.8)
Daily mean °C (°F)	6.2 (43.2)	6.9 (44.4)	9.8 (49.6)	14.3 (57.7)	18.3 (64.9)	21.6 (70.9)	25.5 (77.9)	26.5 (79.7)	23.7 (74.7)	18.7 (65.7)	13.3 (55.9)	8.3 (46.9)	16.1 (61.0)
Mean daily minimum °C (°F)	1.3 (34.3)	1.8 (35.2)	4.4 (39.9)	8.9 (48.0)	13.5 (56.3)	18.0 (64.4)	22.1 (71.8)	23.0 (73.4)	20.1 (68.2)	14.5 (58.1)	8.4 (47.1)	3.3 (37.9)	11.6 (52.9)
Record low °C (°F)	−4.7 (23.5)	−5.1 (22.8)	−3.0 (26.6)	−0.9 (30.4)	3.4 (38.1)	8.6 (47.5)	15.3 (59.5)	15.7 (60.3)	11.5 (52.7)	2.7 (36.9)	−0.9 (30.4)	−4.1 (24.6)	−5.1 (22.8)
Average precipitation mm (inches)	70.9 (2.79)	80.0 (3.15)	164.3 (6.47)	207.3 (8.16)	253.4 (9.98)	312.9 (12.32)	273.6 (10.77)	262.2 (10.32)	474.0 (18.66)	333.8 (13.14)	147.8 (5.82)	90.2 (3.55)	2,670.2 (105.13)
Average precipitation days (≥ 1.0 mm)	5.4	6.3	9.8	9.7	11.1	14.2	12.6	11.4	13.7	11.7	7.0	5.6	118.5
Mean monthly sunshine hours	193.1	172.7	189.8	194.3	183.3	128.2	161.9	189.7	143.9	144.7	164.9	191.5	2,057.9
Source: Japan Meteorological Agency

=== Demographics ===
The population of Kihoku has decreased steadily over the past 40 years.

Historical population
Year	Pop.	±%
1920	23,407	—
1930	25,190	+7.6%
1940	24,365	−3.3%
1950	32,147	+31.9%
1960	30,336	−5.6%
1970	26,691	−12.0%
1980	26,268	−1.6%
1990	23,663	−9.9%
2000	21,362	−9.7%
2010	18,626	−12.8%

== History ==
The area of present-day Kihoku was part of ancient Shima Province, but was transferred to Kii Province in 1582. During this time, large-scale forestry projects were begun. After the Meiji restoration, the area became part of Mie Prefecture. The village of Nagashima was established with the creation of the modern municipalities system on April 1, 1889, and was raised to town status in 1899. It changed its name to Kii-Nagashima in 1970. The town of Kihoku was established on October 11, 2005, by the merger of the towns of Kii-Nagashima and neighboring Miyama.

== Government ==
Kihoku has a mayor-council form of government with a directly elected mayor and a unicameral town council of 16 members. Kihoku, collectively with the city of Owase, contributes two members to the Mie Prefectural Assembly. In terms of national politics, the town is part of Mie 4th district of the lower house of the Diet of Japan.

== Economy ==
Kihoku serves as a commercial center for the surrounding region. Commercial fishing and forestry are the major employers. A well-known product of the former town of Miyama is saury sushi because of the large local catch of saury. At Kihoku, there is the static inverter plant of Kii Channel HVDC system.

== Education ==
Kihoku has nine public elementary schools and four public middle schools operated by the town government. The town does not have a high school.

== Transportation ==
=== Railway ===
JR Tōkai – Kisei Main Line

- Kii-Nagashima - Minose - Funatsu - Aiga

=== Highway ===
- Kisei Expressway
- National Route 42}
- National Route 260
- National Route 422

== Local attractions ==
A portion of the Sacred Sites and Pilgrimage Routes in the Kii Mountain Range, a UNESCO World Heritage Site is located within Kihoku.
