= Miyama, Mie =

Former town in Japan

Miyama (海山町, Miyama-chō) was a town located in Kitamuro District, Mie Prefecture, Japan.

A referendum was held and rejected in 2001 among the town's population on whether a nuclear power plant should be built nearby to act as a method to improve the town.

As of 2003, the town had an estimated population of 9,963 and a density of 68.08 persons per km^{2}. The total area was 146.35 km^{2}.

On October 11, 2005, Miyama, along with the town of Kiinagashima (also from Kitamuro District), was merged to create the town of Kihoku.

Miyama, now Kihoku, is in the south of Mie Prefecture. The World Heritage Site Kumano Kodo is located in the former town of Miyama. "Kumano" stands for the city's name. "Kodo" means an old street which is laid along mountain. Miyama is known for its fresh fish. The most well-known local food is saury sushi.
