= Kii-Nagashima Station =

Railway station in Kihoku, Mie Prefecture, Japan

Kii-Nagashima Station 紀伊長島駅
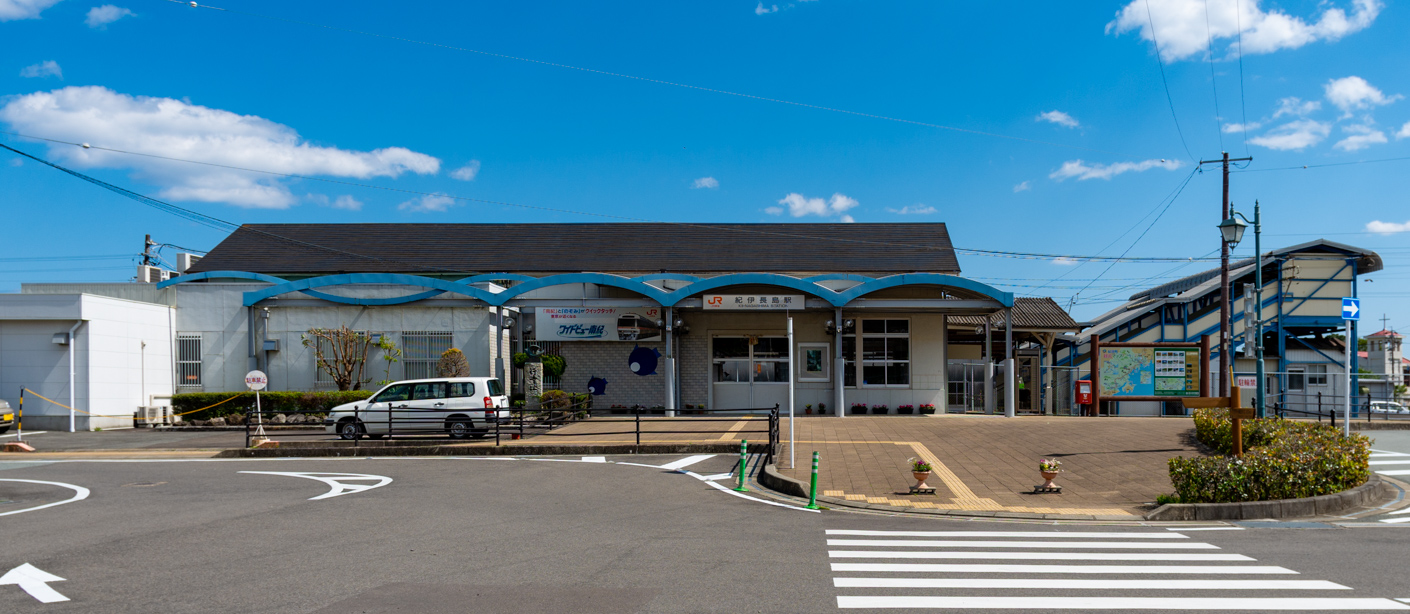
- Kii-Nagashima Station

General information
- Location: 301 Higashi-Nagashima, Kihoku-machi, Kitamuro-gun, Mie-ken 519-3204; Japan
- Coordinates: 34.2092°N 136.3397°E
- Operator: JR Tōkai
- Line: ■ Kisei Main Line
- Distance: 98.4 km from Kameyama
- Platforms: 1 Island + 1 side platform
- Tracks: 3
- Connections: Bus terminal

Construction
- Structure type: Ground level

Other information
- Status: Staffed

History
- Opened: 29 April 1930

Passengers
- FY2019: 217 daily

Services
Preceding station	JR Central	Following station
Minose towards Shingū	Kisei Main Line Local	Umegadani towards Nagoya
Owase towards Shingū	Kisei Main Line Nanki	Misedani towards Nagoya
Location
- Location within Mie Prefecture Location within Japan

Kii-Nagashima Station (紀伊長島駅, Kii-Nagashima-eki) is a passenger railway station in located in the town of Kihoku, Kitamuro District, Mie Prefecture, Japan, operated by Central Japan Railway Company (JR Tōkai).

== Lines ==
Kii-Nagashima Station is served by the Kisei Main Line, and is located 98.4 km (61.1 mi) from the terminus of the line at Kameyama Station.

== Station layout ==
The station consists of a single side platform and a single island platform serving three tracks, connected to the station building by a footbridge. The wooden station building dates from the original construction. The station is attended.

=== Platforms ===
1	■ Kisei Main Line	For Matsusaka, Nagoya
2	■ Kisei Main Line	For Owase, Shingū
3	■ Kisei Main Line	auxiliary platform for bidirectional traffic

== History ==
Kii-Nagashima Station opened on 29 April 1930 on the Japanese Government Railways (JGR) Kisei East Line. The line was extended to Minose Station by 26 April 1932, and the JGR became the Japan National Railways (JNR) after World War II. The line was renamed the Kisei Main Line on 15 July 1959. The station was absorbed into the JR Central network upon the privatization of the JNR on 1 April 1987.

== Passenger statistics ==
In fiscal 2019, the station was used by an average of 217 passengers daily (boarding passengers only).

== Surrounding area ==
- Kihoku Town Office
- Kihoku Municipal Kihoku Junior High School
- Kihoku Municipal Higashi Elementary School

== See also ==
- List of railway stations in Japan
