= Funatsu Station (Kihoku) =

Railway station in Kihoku, Mie Prefecture, Japan

Funatsu Station 船津駅
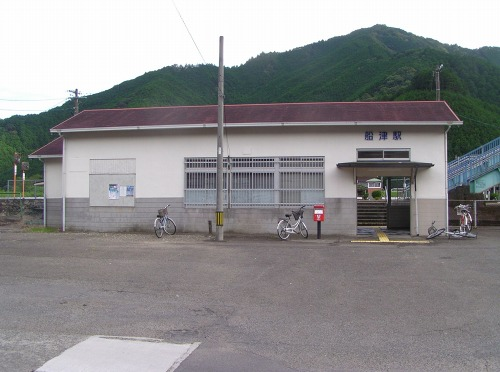
- Funatsu Station in August, 2007

General information
- Location: 456 Kamisato, Kihoku-machi, Kitamuro-gun, Mie-ken 519-3403; Japan
- Coordinates: 34°08′32″N 136°13′43″E
- Operator: JR Tōkai
- Line: ■ Kisei Main Line
- Distance: 112.2 km from Kameyama
- Platforms: 2 side platforms
- Tracks: 2
- Connections: Bus terminal

Construction
- Structure type: Ground level

Other information
- Status: Unstaffed

History
- Opened: 19 December 1934

Passengers
- FY2019: 68 daily

Services
| Preceding station | JR Central | Following station |
|---|---|---|
| Aiga towards Shingū | Kisei Main Line Local | Minose towards Nagoya |
Location
- Location within Mie Prefecture Location within Japan

Funatsu Station (船津駅, Funatsu-eki) is a passenger railway station in located in the town of Kihoku, Kitamuro District, Mie Prefecture, Japan, operated by Central Japan Railway Company (JR Tōkai).

== Lines ==
Funatsu Station is served by the Kisei Main Line, and is located 112.2 km (69.7 mi) from the terminus of the line at Kameyama Station.

== Station layout ==
The station consists of two opposed side platforms connected to the station building by a footbridge. The wooden station building dates from the original construction. However, normally only platform 1 is in use for bi-directional traffic.

=== Platforms ===
| 1 | ■ Kisei Main Line | For Matsusaka Nagoya; For Owase, Shingū |
| 2 | ■ Kisei Main Line | through traffic |

== History ==
Funatsu Station opened on 19 December 1934 on the Japanese Government Railways (JGR) Kisei East Line. From 1941 to 1958, the Osugidani Forest Railway (大杉谷森林鉄道, Osugidami Shinrin Testdo) also operated to this station. The JGR became the Japan National Railways (JNR) after World War 2, and the line was extended to Kuki Station by 12 January 1957. The line was renamed the Kisei Main Line on 15 July 1959. The station was absorbed into the JR Central network upon the privatization of the JNR on 1 April 1987. The station has been unattended since 31 March 2005.

== Passenger statistics ==
In fiscal year 2019, the station was used by an average of 68 passengers daily (boarding passengers only).

== Surrounding area ==
- Kihoku Municipal Mifune Junior High School
- Miyama Kyodo Museum
- Kihoku Town Hall Funatsu Branch Office

== See also ==
- List of railway stations in Japan
