= Aiga Station =

Railway station in Kihoku, Mie Prefecture, Japan

Aiga Station 相賀駅
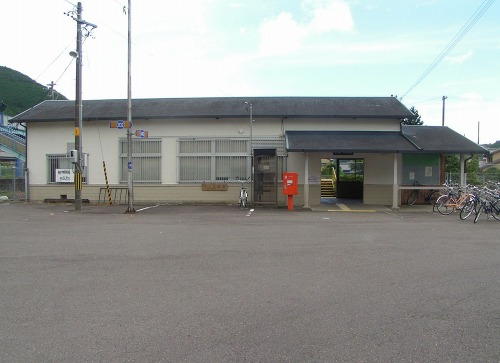
- Aiga Station in August 2007

General information
- Location: 239 Aiga, Kihoku-cho, Kitamuro-gun, Mie-ken 519-3406; Japan
- Coordinates: 34.1118°N 136.2265°E
- Operator: JR Tōkai
- Line: ■ Kisei Main Line
- Distance: 116.6 km from Kameyama
- Platforms: 2 side platforms
- Tracks: 2
- Connections: Bus terminal

Construction
- Structure type: Ground level

Other information
- Status: Unstaffed

History
- Opened: 19 December 1934

Passengers
- FY2019: 122 daily

Services
Preceding station	JR Central	Following station
Owase towards Shingū	Kisei Main Line Local	Funatsu towards Nagoya
Location
- Location within Mie Prefecture Location within Japan

Aiga Station (相賀駅, Aiga-eki) is a passenger railway station in located in the town of Kihoku, Kitamuro District, Mie Prefecture, Japan, operated by Central Japan Railway Company (JR Tōkai).

== Lines ==
Aiga Station is served by the Kisei Main Line, and is located 116.6 km (72.5 mi) from the terminus of the line at Kameyama Station.

== Station layout ==
The station consists of two opposed side platforms connected to the station building by a footbridge.

=== Platforms ===
1	■ Kisei Main Line	for Matsusaka and Nagoya
2	■ Kisei Main Line	for Owase and Shingū

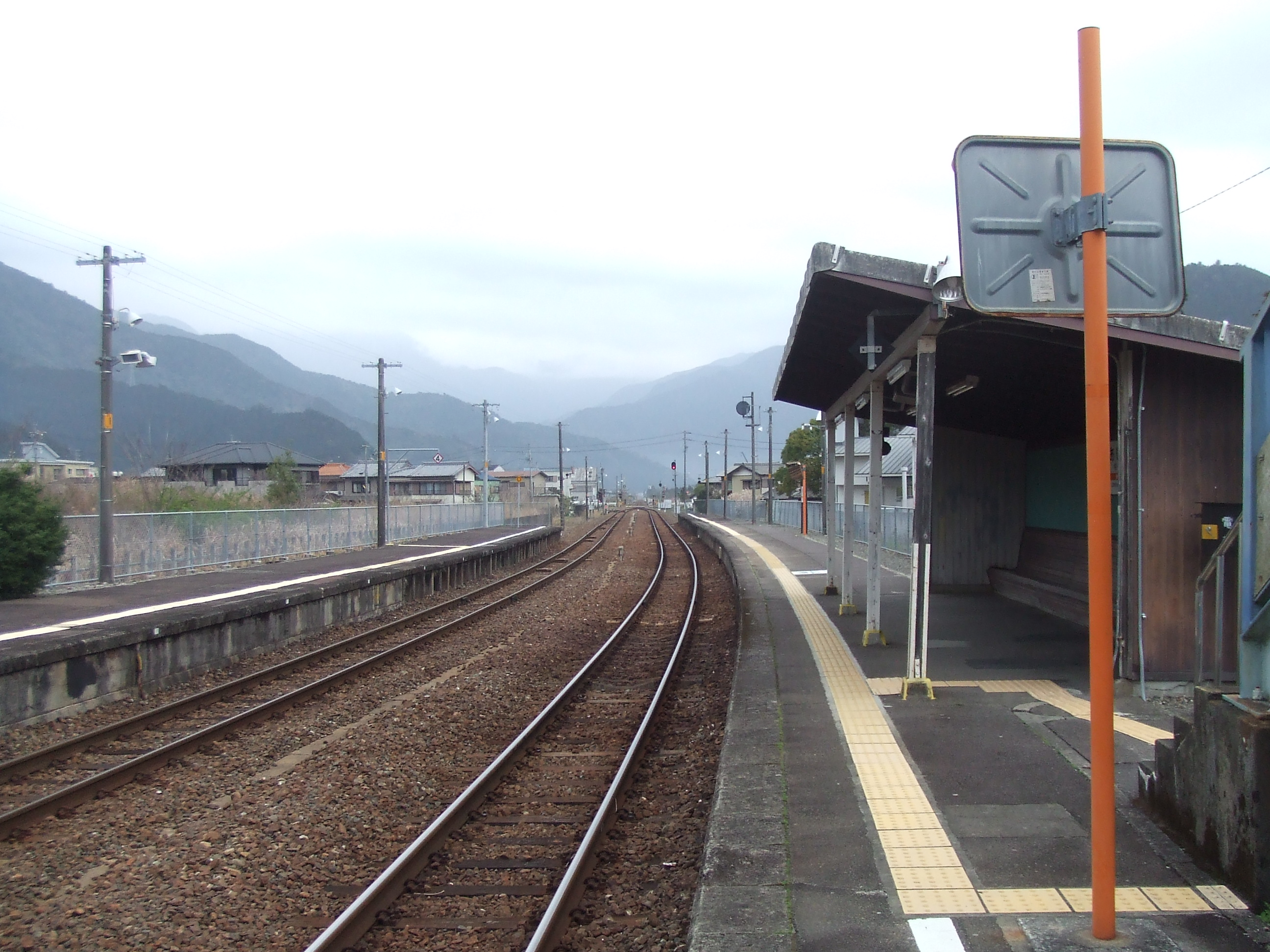
The platforms in March 2010

== History ==
Aiga Station opened on 19 December 1934, on the Japanese Government Railways (JGR) Kisei East Line. The JGR became the Japanese National Railways (JNR) after World War 2, and the line was extended to Kuki Station by January 12, 1957. The line was renamed the Kisei Main Line on 15 July 1959. The station was absorbed into the JR Central network upon the privatization of JNR on 1 April 1987.

== Passenger statistics ==
In fiscal 2019, the station was used by an average of 122 passengers daily (boarding passengers only).

== Surrounding area ==
- Kihoku Municipal Shionan Junior High School
- Kihoku Town Miyama Library
- Kihoku Municipal Aiga Elementary School

== See also ==
- List of railway stations in Japan
