= Nanki Otokoyama ware =

Type of Japanese pottery from Kii Province

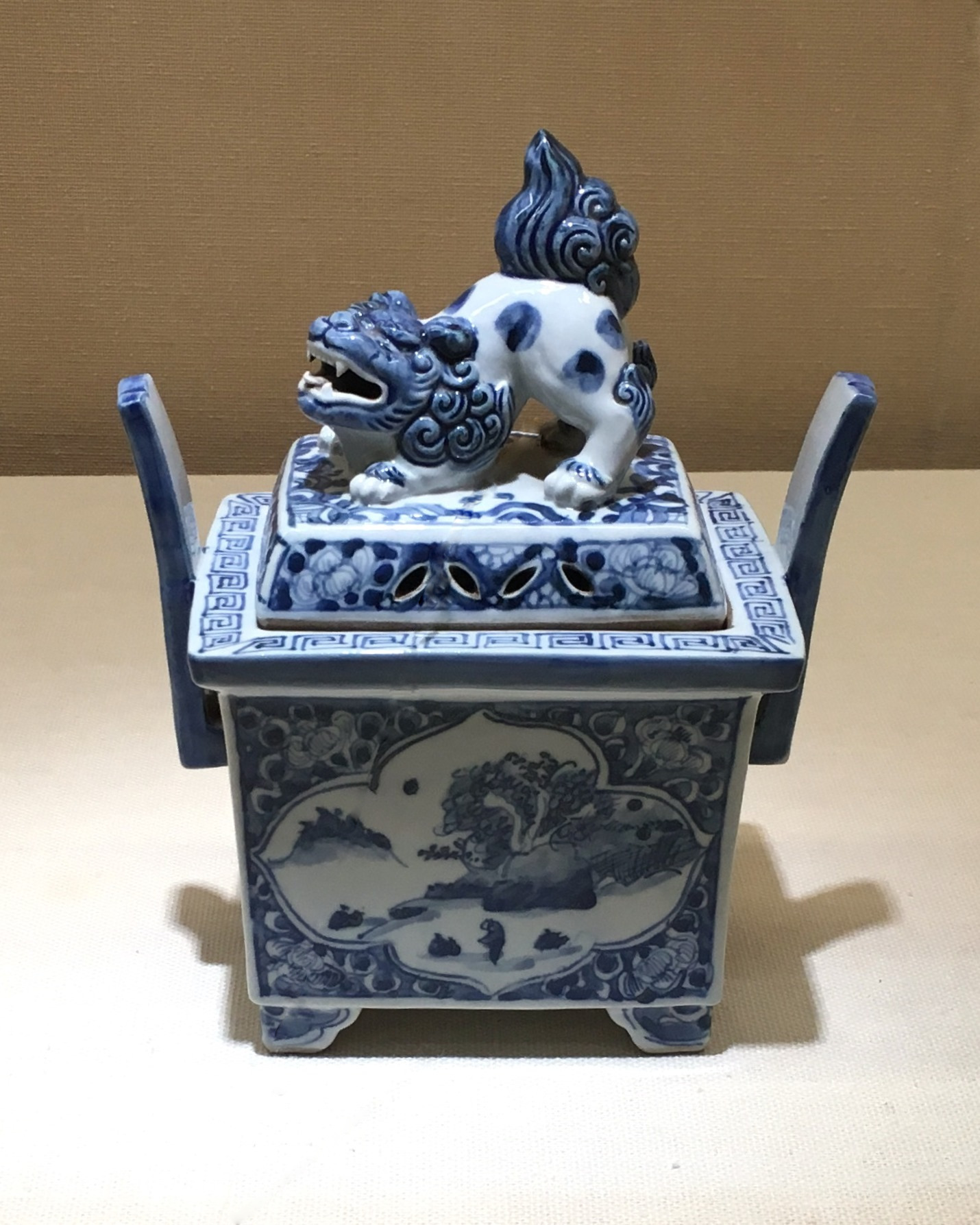
Nanki Otokoyama ware incense burner, landscape design, blue underglaze. Edo period, 19th century

Nanki Otokoyama ware (南紀男山焼) is a type of Japanese pottery originally from southern Kii Province, central Japan. It is also known generally as Otokoyama ware.

== History ==
It should not be confused with the same-named kiln in Himeji.

A large number of pieces are blue and white pottery.
