= Kii-Nagashima, Mie =

Former town in Japan

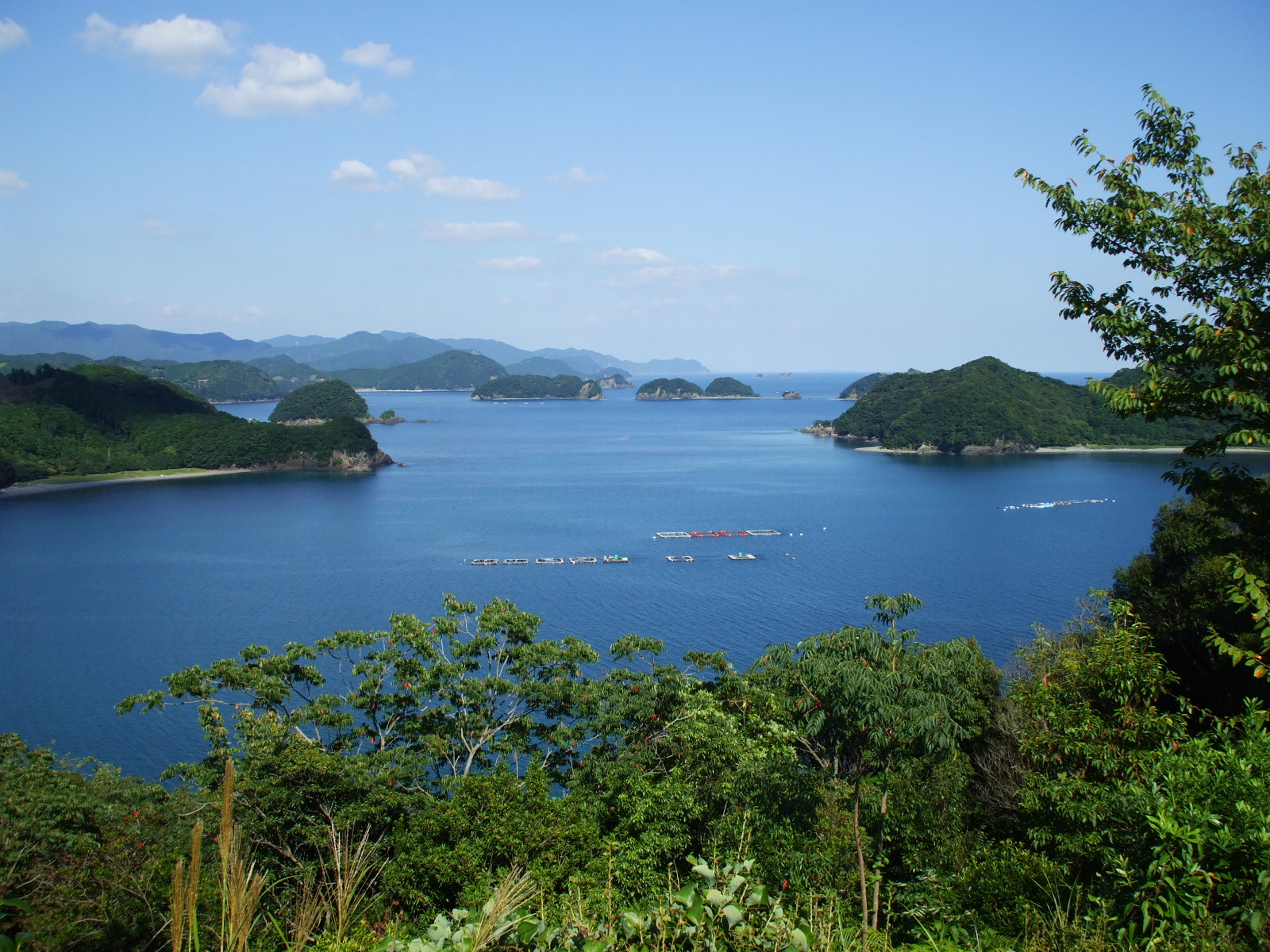
Kumano Bay

Kiinagashima (紀伊長島町, Kiinagashima-chō) (or Kii-Nagashima) was a town located in Kitamuro District, Mie Prefecture, Japan. On October 11, 2005, Kiinagashima, along with the town of Miyama (also from Kitamuro District), was merged to create the town of Kihoku.

In 2003, the town had an estimated population of 10,617 and a population density of 96.10 per square kilometre (248.9/sq mi). The total area was 110.48 square kilometres (42.66 sq mi).
