= Minose Station =

Railway station in Kihoku, Mie Prefecture, Japan

Minose Station 三野瀬駅
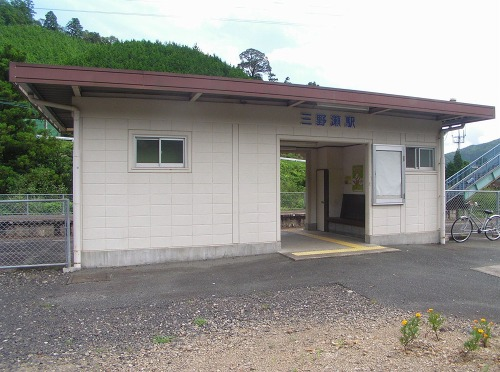
- Minose Station, August 2007

General information
- Location: 182 Minose, Kihoku-machi, Kitamuro-gun, Mie-ken 519-3208; Japan
- Coordinates: 34.1673°N 136.2825°E
- Operator: JR Tōkai
- Line: ■ Kisei Main Line
- Distance: 105.9 km from Kameyama
- Platforms: 2 side platforms
- Tracks: 2
- Connections: Bus terminal

Construction
- Structure type: Ground level

Other information
- Status: Unstaffed

History
- Opened: 26 April 1932

Passengers
- FY2019: 29 daily

Services
Preceding station	JR Central	Following station
Funatsu towards Shingū	Kisei Main Line Local	Kii-Nagashima towards Nagoya
Location
- Location within Mie Prefecture Location within Japan

Minose Station (三野瀬駅, Minose-eki) is a passenger railway station in located in the town of Kihoku, Kitamuro District, Mie Prefecture, Japan, operated by Central Japan Railway Company (JR Tōkai).

== Lines ==
Minose Station is served by the Kisei Main Line, and is located 105.9 rail kilometers from the terminus of the line at Kameyama Station.

== Station layout ==
The station consists of two opposed side platforms connected to the station building by a footbridge. The wooden station building dates from the original construction.

=== Platforms ===
1	■ Kisei Main Line	For Matsusaka, Nagoya
2	■ Kisei Main Line	For Owase, Shingū

== History ==
Minose Station opened on 26 April 1932 on the Japanese Government Railways (JGR) Kisei East Line. The line was extended to Owase Station by 19 December 1934, and the JGR became the Japan National Railways (JNR) after World War II. The line was renamed the Kisei Main Line on 15 July 1959. The station has been unattended since 21 December 1983. The station was absorbed into the JR Central network upon the privatization of the JNR on 1 April 1987.

== Passenger statistics ==
In fiscal 2019, the station was used by an average of 29 passengers daily (boarding passengers only).

== Surrounding area ==
- Kihoku Town Hall Minose Branch Office
- Kihoku Town Miura Elementary School
- Kaizo-ji

== See also ==
- List of railway stations in Japan
