= Akame Ichishikyō Prefectural Natural Park =

Natural park of Mie prefecture, Japan

- 赤目一志峡県立自然公園
- Interactive map of Akame Ichishikyō Prefectural Natural Park
- Location: Mie Prefecture, Japan
- Coordinates: 34°36′06″N 136°18′08″E
- Area: 220.43 km^{2} (85.11 sq mi)
- Established: 14 October 1948

Akame Ichishikyō Prefectural Natural Park (赤目一志峡県立自然公園, Akame Ichishikyō kenritsu shizen kōen)

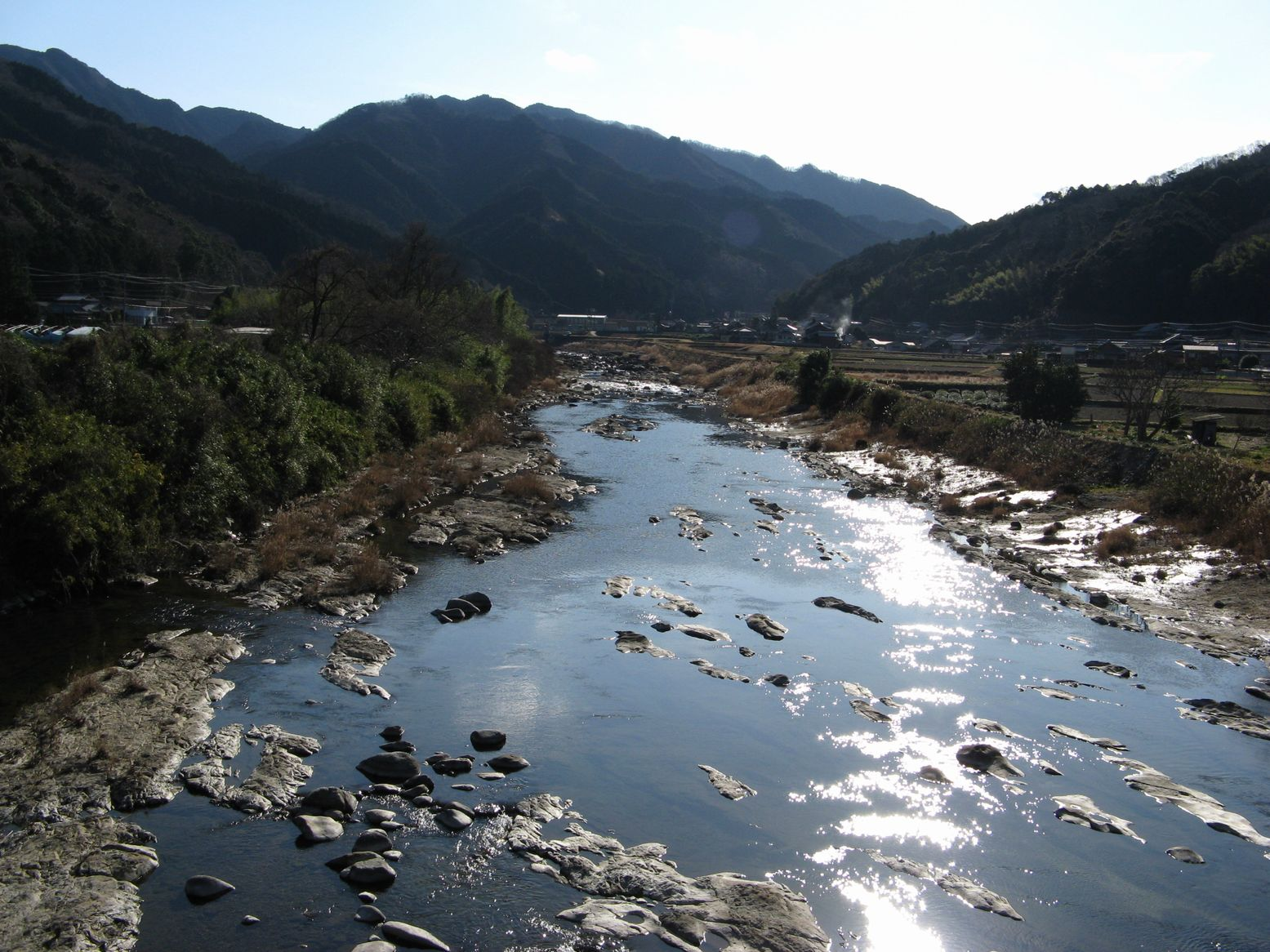
Kumozu River

is a Prefectural Natural Park in central Mie Prefecture, Japan. Established in 1948, the park spans the municipalities of Matsusaka, Tsu, and Nabari.

== See also ==
- National Parks of Japan
