= Ise-no-Umi Prefectural Natural Park =

Natural park of Mie prefecture, Japan

- 伊勢の海県立自然公園
- Location within Mie Prefecture Location within Japan
- Location: Mie Prefecture, Japan
- Coordinates: 34.85°N 136.605°E
- Area: 7.82 km^{2} (3.02 sq mi)
- Established: 1 October 1953

Ise-no-Umi Prefectural Natural Park (伊勢の海県立自然公園, Ise-no-Umi kenritsu shizen kōen) is a Prefectural Natural Park on the coast of Mie Prefecture, Japan. Established in 1953, the park spans the municipalities of Suzuka and Tsu.

== See also ==
- National Parks of Japan
- Ise-Shima National Park
