= Kahadakyō Prefectural Natural Park =

Prefectural Natural Park in Mie Prefecture, Japan

- 香肌峡県立自然公園
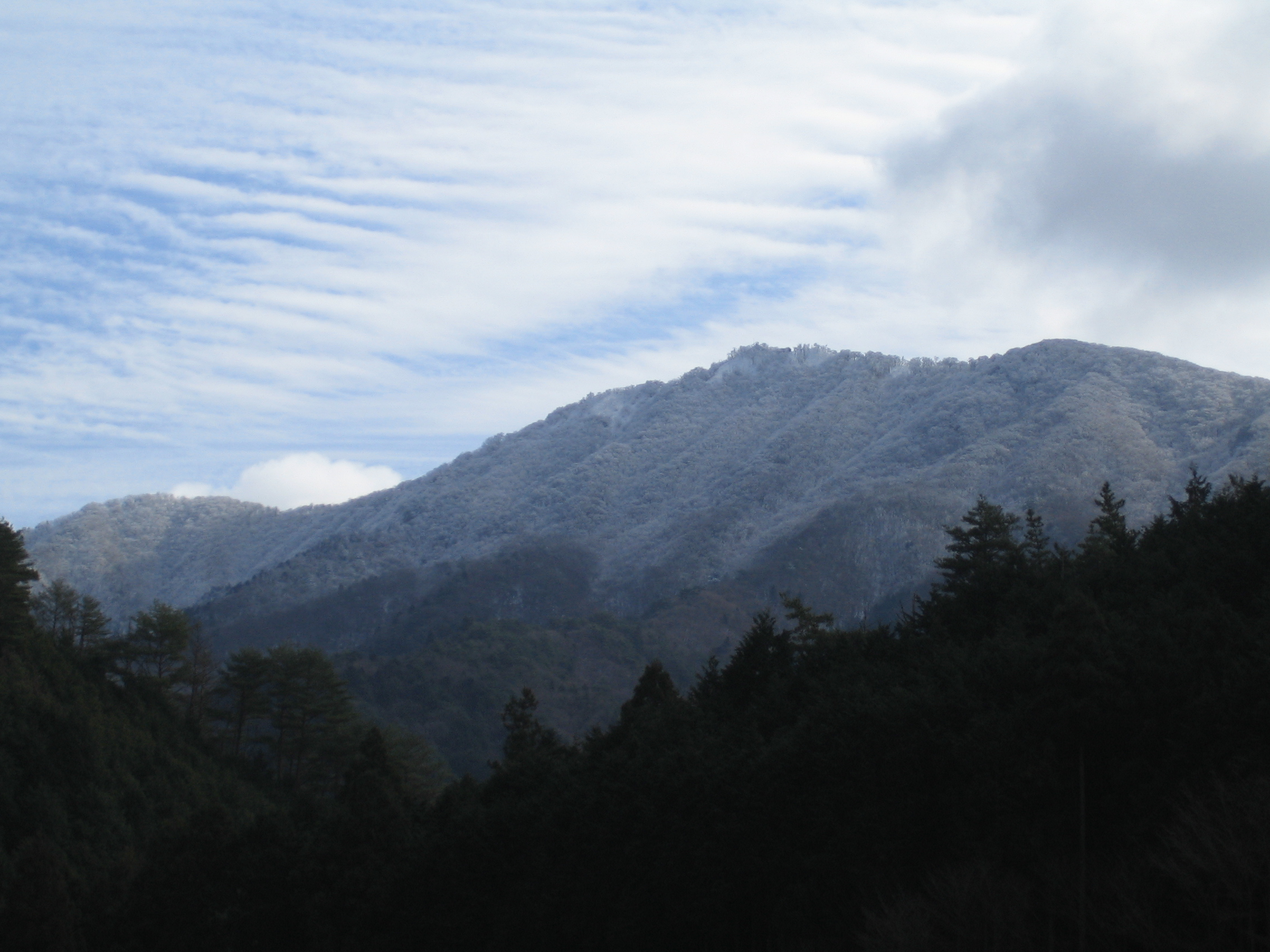
- Mount Takami
- Interactive map of Kahadakyō Prefectural Natural Park
- Location: Mie Prefecture, Japan
- Coordinates: 34°22′53″N 136°13′24″E
- Area: 247.64 km^{2} (95.61 sq mi)
- Established: 1 October 1953

Kahadakyō Prefectural Natural Park (香肌峡県立自然公園, Kahadakyō kenritsu shizen kōen) is a Prefectural Natural Park in central Mie Prefecture, Japan. Established in 1953, the park spans the municipalities of Matsusaka and Taki.

== See also ==
- National Parks of Japan
