= Ito Ranch =

Japanese cattle ranch

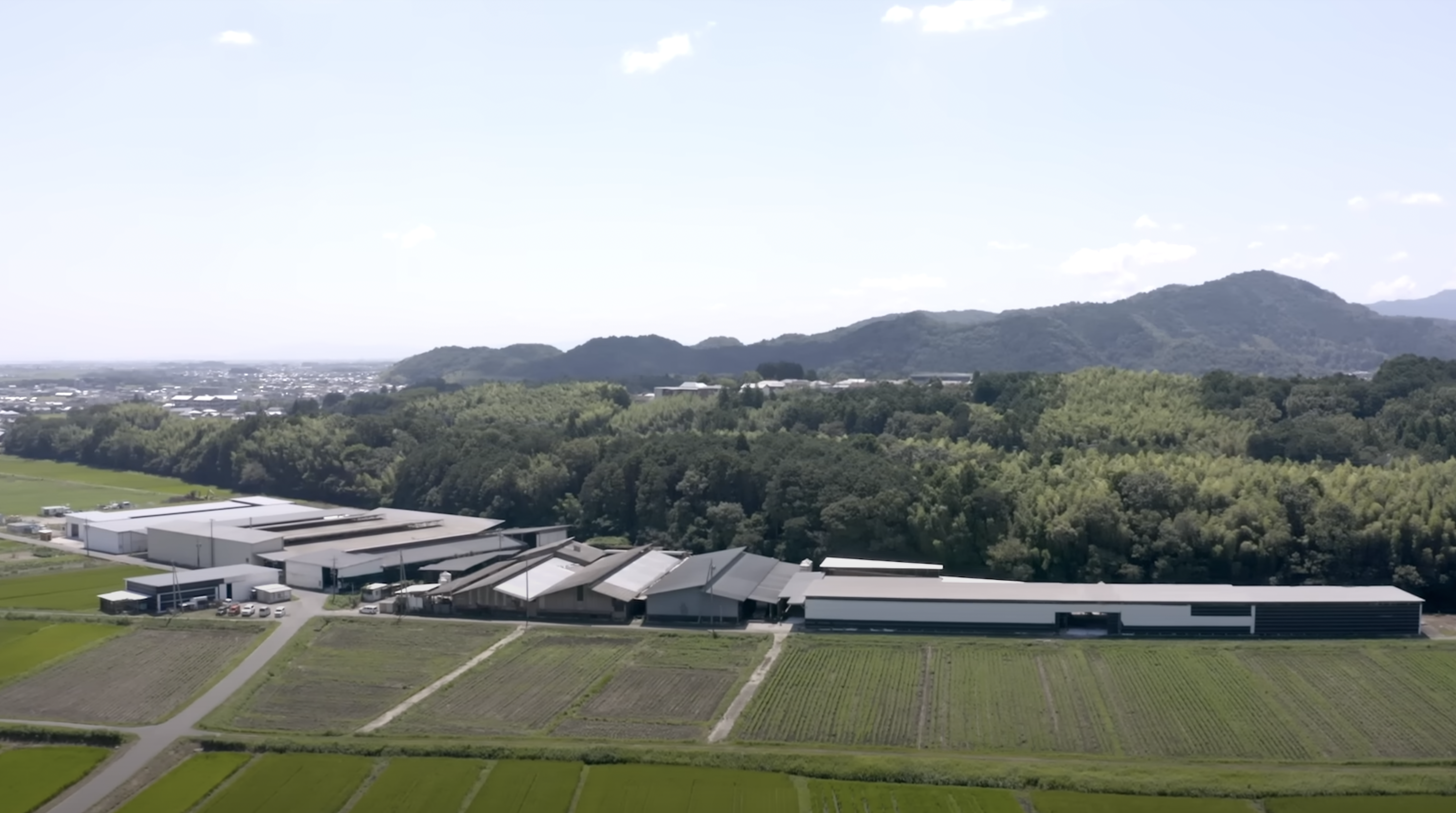
- Sky view of Ito Ranch in 2023.
- Interactive map of Ito Ranch
- Country: Japan
- Coordinates: 34.6638°N 136.4224°E
- Established: 1953
- Owner: Hiroki Ito
- Website: Official website

Ito Ranch (伊藤牧場) is a Matsusaka beef farm located near the city of Tsu, Mie Prefecture, Japan, dedicated to raising kuroge wagyū or Japanese Black beef. Founded in 1953, as of 2024 it is owned by Hiroki Ito (伊藤浩基), and is claimed by the country's meat industry, and by the specialized foreign press, to be the farm that produces the best meat in Japan, and the world.

The farm has developed breeding standards believed by its operators to yield the best quality of wagyū beef, and has achieved six victories in the Matsusaka Beef Carcass Contest, the annual contest that determines the highest quality beef. It is the only farm to win the trophy more than twice.

== History ==
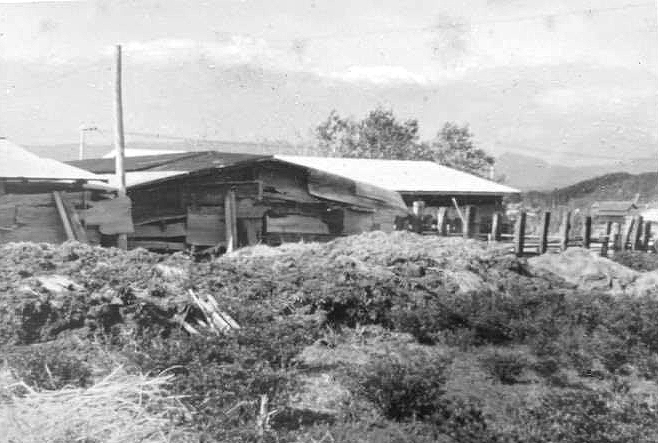
Ichishicho in 1949. Ito Ranch was established on this plot in 1953.

Ito Ranch was founded in 1953 with only 10 cows, by Masakazu Ito (伊藤正一, 1923~2013), grandfather of Hiroki Ito, who established his farm in the ancient village of Ichishisho, today part of Tsu, fed by waters from the Kumozu, Kushida and Miya rivers. At that time, the Japanese ate little meat and cattle in Japan were basically seen as draft animals for farming. As Japan became westernized, especially after the Second World War, farmers of his generation began raising cows for meat. Some farms in the Matsusaka region began the practice of massaging cows and giving them beer in order to relax them and stimulate their appetite. Masakazu Ito was one of them.

Hideo Ito (伊藤英雄, 1960~), son of Masakazu Ito, was one of the farmers who continued such practice when he took over in 1976 with 64 head of cattle. Hiroki Ito, son of Hideo Ito and grandson of the founder, grew up on the farm with his father, from whom he learned the usual breeding techniques.

Upon inheriting the management of the farm in 2010, already with 250 cows, Hiroki Ito decided to abandon the practice of massages and beer to focus on the four factors that he believed had a more significant impact on the quality of the meat: pedigree, diet, long breeding and a stress-free life.

Based on his own observations, he decided that studying the cow's pedigree was decisive and learned to distinguish a good calf by looking at the genetic inheritance of the animal, as well as its external appearance. In order to verify the results of the tests applied to his own method, in 2016 he opened Yakiniku Ito, his own restaurant less than 8 km from the farm, thus taking control over practically the entire life cycle of the cow in a continuous learning and improvement process.

== Breeding ==
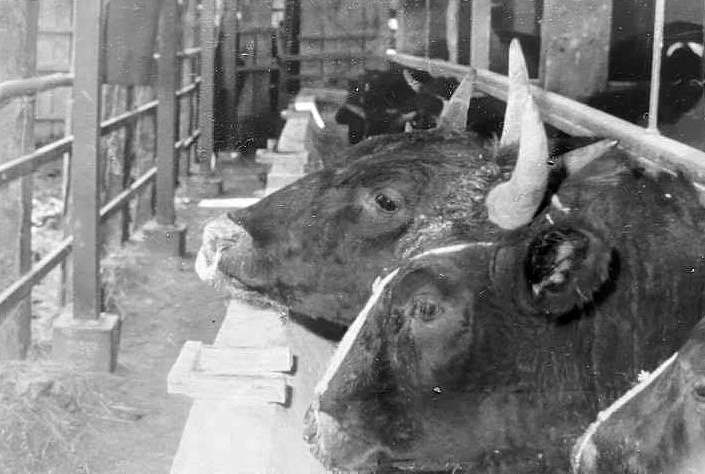
Cows at Ito Ranch in 1956.

Hiroki Ito spends half of his time traveling around Japan in search of suckling calves between seven and ten months old, which he acquires at auctions that take place every month in different prefectures, and for which he pays up to 1,600,000 yen Japanese (about €10,000) per calf. He studies the pedigree and carefully observes the calf, first analyzing its face, forehead and eyes. He also observes whether the horns are well formed. He also looks at the size of the head and nose. Then he looks at the cow from behind, back and hindquarters, before determining which specimen to take.

As the Matsusaka Beef canon dictates, these are always virgin cows, which have never calved. According to Hiroki Ito, "cow meat is tastier and more tender than ox". In cattle raising, the time factor is essential because from the thirtieth month onwards, saturated fatty acids become unsaturated fatty acids. Ito Ranch cows are raised between 35 and 45 months, longer than those of other farms, to obtain meat richer in oleic acid, a lower melting point and, as a consequence, a better flavor, sweeter and greater tenderness.

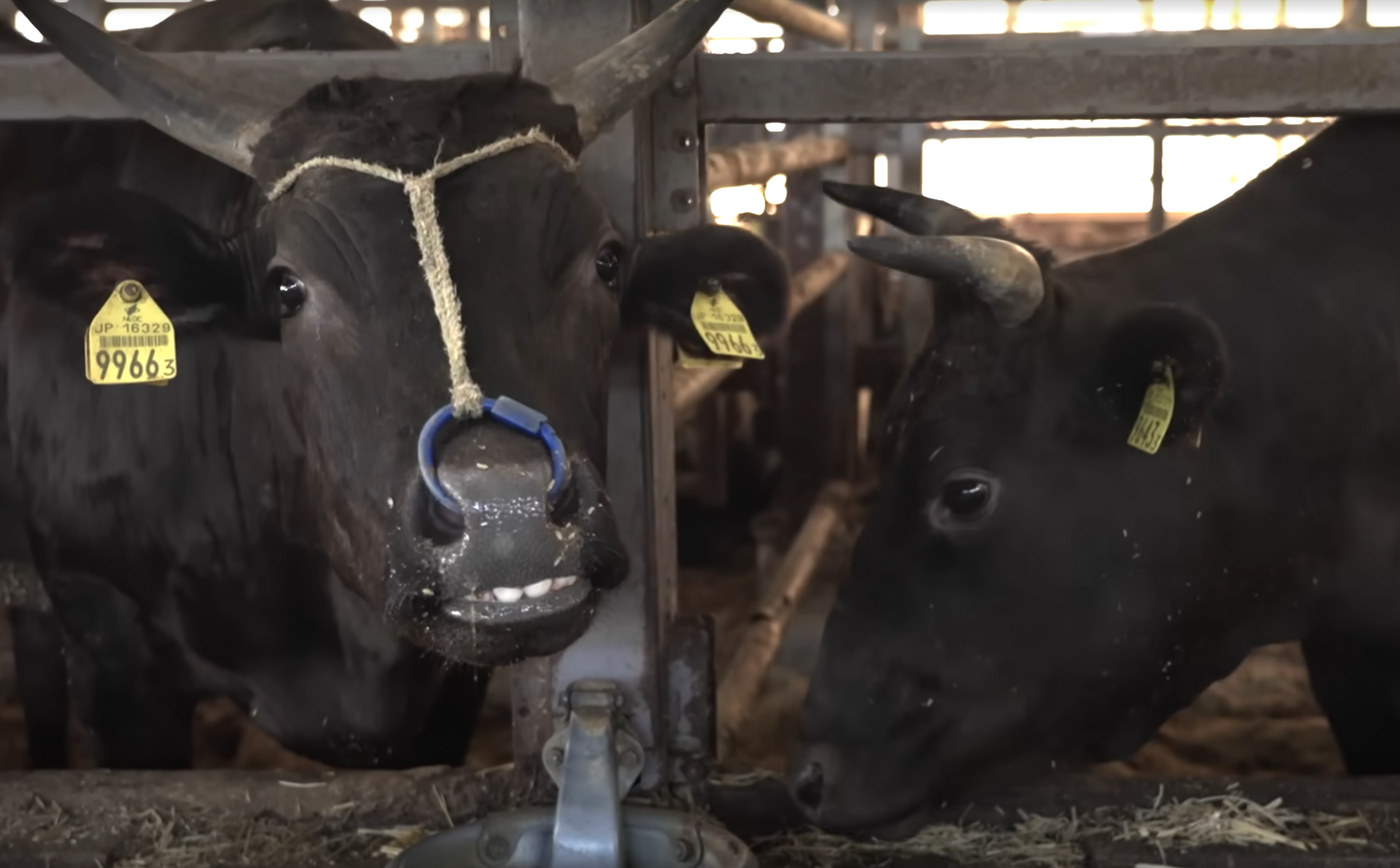
Cows at Ito Ranch in 2023.

However, aging for more than 30 months entails risks for the farmer and requires more attention and skill. With aging, cows lose appetite and their ability to sense temperature. Their organs weaken and they can contract common conditions such as myocardial infarction or fatal necrosis, damaging the quality of the meat and ruining a 3-year investment. Therefore, the usual aging period on wagyū farms is 25 to 30 months, 29 to 30 months in the case of Kobe Beef, and 30 to 32 months in the rest of the Matsusaka Beef farms.

At Ito Ranch, each cow occupies an individual barn large enough for two cows, which allows for "meticulous compliance with quality standards in hygiene and personalized care for each cow", fundamental factors for long breeding times. To relieve stress caused by the strong summer heat, Ito Ranch cows are sprayed with cold water through fans.

Ito Ranch also practices eco-circular and sustainable agriculture where the cows feed on rice straw harvested with organic fertilizer from the cow itself, which is left to ferment for a year. They eat this straw first to prepare the stomach, and are then given a forage or concentrated feed that contains a proprietary mix of bran, oats, soybeans, bean cake and corn.

A heavy initial investment, prolonged breeding, individual double housing and personalized care are some of the factors that explain high production costs. On average, just raising a cow at Ito Ranch is already 33% more expensive than any other Matsusaka beef farm and 56% more than Kobe beef farms. At the end of the chain, in the restaurant, 100 grams of Ito Ranch tenderloin can cost more than €500.

== Reception ==
In a study by the Mie Livestock Research Institute and the Aichi Agricultural Experiment Station, Ito Ranch meat reached a melting point of 12 °C, compared to the 17.4 °C on average for Matsusaka Beef, 20 °C of Kobe Beef, and 25.9 °C for other wagyū.

The Financial Times has described Ito Ranch beef as the "star of the world's most exclusive menu". Ludovic Bischoff wrote for Les Echos that it is the "rarest, most expensive and tastiest meat in Japan". Critic Jakob Strobel of the German newspaper Frankfurter Allgemeine Zeitung considered Ito Ranch "much better than Kobe beef and Ōmi beef".

According to Fernanda Reggero of the Italian economic newspaper Il Sole 24 Ore, "it catapults you into another world". The Belgian newspaper De Tijd described it as "the definitive perfection".

On September 20, 2023, in a private tasting with Hiroki Ito held at the Consulate General of Japan in Barcelona, Catalan chef Ferran Adrià stated that he had never tasted meat like it, considering it "from another dimension". On March 16, 2023, Japanese Prime Minister Fumio Kishida chose the Kappo Yoshizawa restaurant in the Ginza neighborhood of Tokyo to entertain the President of South Korea, Yoon Suk Yeol, during his visit official to Japan, with a dinner highlighting Ito Ranch-bred meat.

== Ito Ranch tenderloin ==
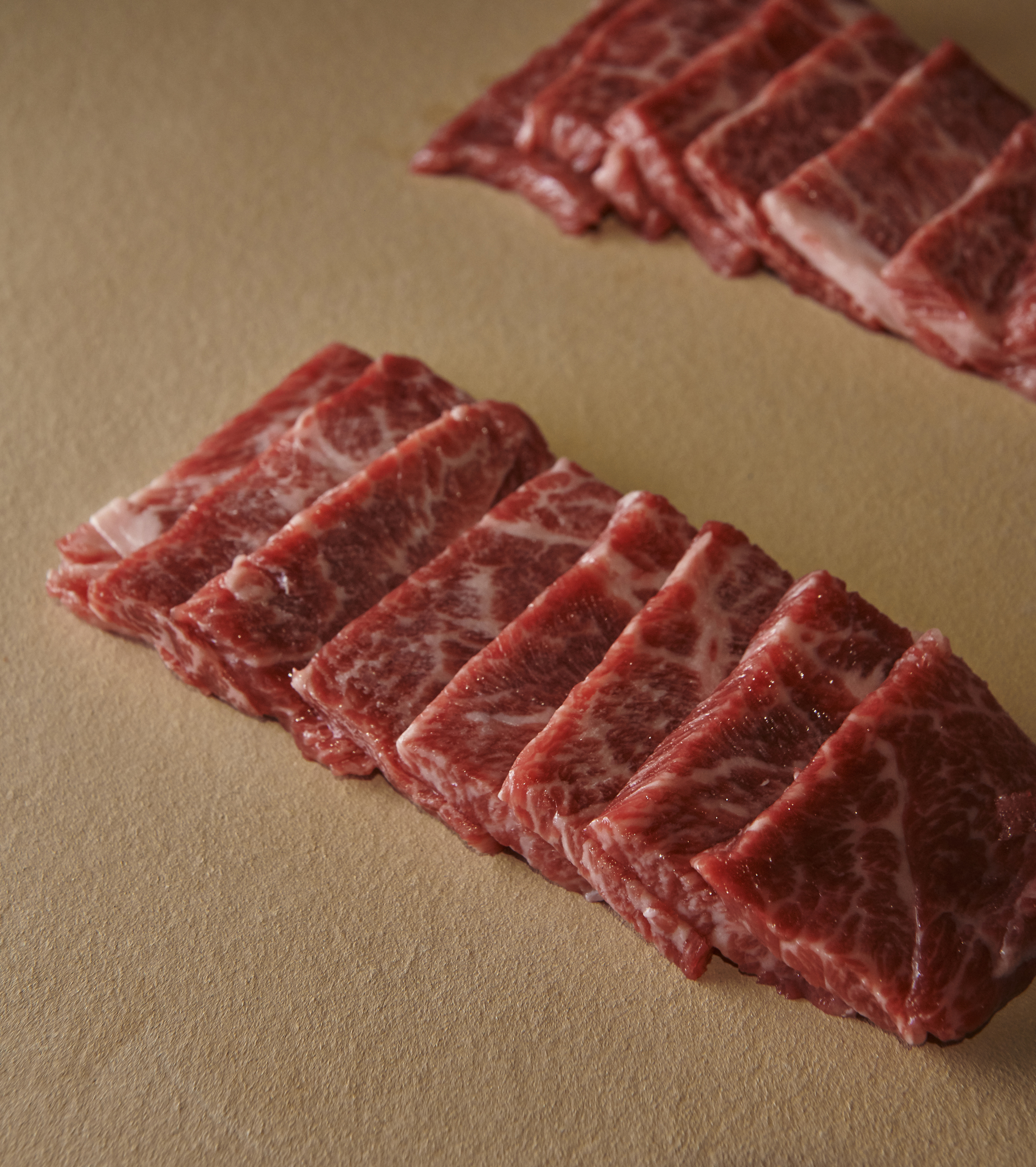
Tenderloin cuts from Ito Ranch.

The tenderloin (テンダーロイン) from Ito Ranch was described as "the holy grail of Japanese Wagyū cuts" in a December 2023 wagyū promotion campaign conducted by chef Paul Delrez for the Japan External Trade Organization (JETRO), a non-profit institution for the promotion of Japanese products. It has been similarly praised by critics.

In an investigative article seeking the best beef in the world, Ajesh Patalay of the Financial Times pointed to the Ito Ranch tenderloin for its ability to dissolve on the tongue like "a beef pastel" or a "square of bovine dark chocolate". Ludovic Bischoff of Les Echos describes it as "the cut that melts in your hand". For critic Jakob Strobel of the German newspaper Frankfurter Allgemeine it is "the pinnacle of all pleasures." Els Maes from the Belgian lifestyle magazine Sabato, describes it as having a light pink color "more similar to salmon than beef." Regarding the organoleptic characteristics, Maes states that its texture "is more reminiscent of the best piece of bluefish sashimi," and that it is like "nothing we have ever tried". The magazine HTSI (How To Spend It) of the Italian newspaper Il Sole 24 Ore, speaks of "an incomparable sweetness and lightness".

Since meat with a melting point below 17 °C sticks to the shackles of the grill like butter, Hiroki Ito designed a spatula to use himself in his own restaurant. This caught the attention of Business Insider personnel during their filming of a report "Why Matsusaka Wagyu Is The Most Expensive Beef In The World", in August 2023. Akaneya Group, the distributor for the European Union and the United Kingdom of Ito Ranch meat, ordered 10 copies of this spatula, individually numbered, to be included as cutlery on the star tasting menu of its restaurants. The Italian journalist Fernanda Roggero of Il Sole 24 Ore sent a request to the distributor Akaneya Group to obtain spatula number 6, signed by Hiroki Ito. Number 1 is displayed in a display case at the Marie Akaneya restaurant in Paris.

Condé Nast Traveler stated that the Ito Ranch tenderloin "is the only cut of meat in the world that may require a spatula to grab it and put it in your mouth without breaking it in the process". The newspaper La Vanguardia, organizer of the official Matsusaka Beef presentation tasting in Barcelona, witnessed how the Catalan chef Ferran Adrià "had to resort to said spatula to remove the Ito Ranch tenderloin from one of the portable barbecues that were set up".

== License ==
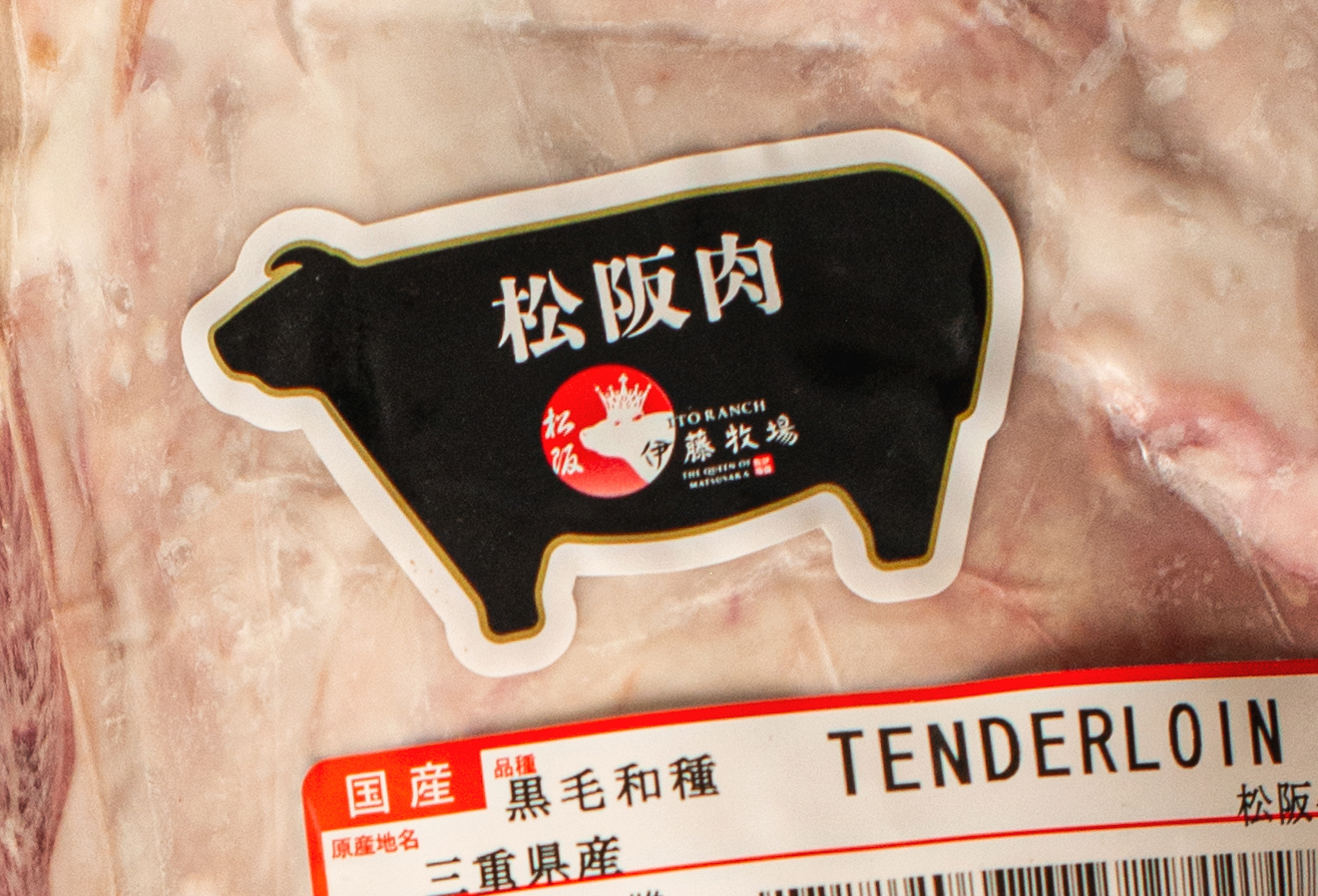
Authenticity Sticker on package of tenderloin from Ito Ranch.

Ito Ranch markets its meat under its own brand, "Ito Ranch", which it distributes to a small selection of licensed restaurants. The farm belongs to the group of 120 farms currently attached to the Matsusaka Beef Association and its meat is in turn given the commercial name of Matsusaka Beef. Ito Ranch is the only farm in the world whose meat requires official authorization for sale. The license badge is a certificate and a statue in the shape of a 6 Kg black cow made from polylactic acid (PLA) resin, property of Ito Ranch and personalized with the licensee's trade name. Possession of a license grants the restaurant an exclusivity radius of 840 meters. The packaged cuts of beef have two identifiers of authenticity: an official Ito Ranch sticker, which represents the license statue, and another from Matsusaka Beef.

Interested restaurants submit applications to Ito Ranch through an approved distributor. The applicant must specify the desired cuts and quantities, provide information about the restaurant profile and sign a behavioral commitment. Hiroki Ito evaluates the request personally, without a set response deadline. Licensing outside Japan is subject to availability of meat for export and is planned to grant no more than 10 new licenses until 2025. Licensed restaurant staff must complete a training course on the different cuts and how to cut them optimally, and another course on the characteristics and history of Matsusaka beef.
