= Okuise Miyagawakyō Prefectural Natural Park =

Natural park of Mie prefecture, Japan

- 奥伊勢宮川峡県立自然公園
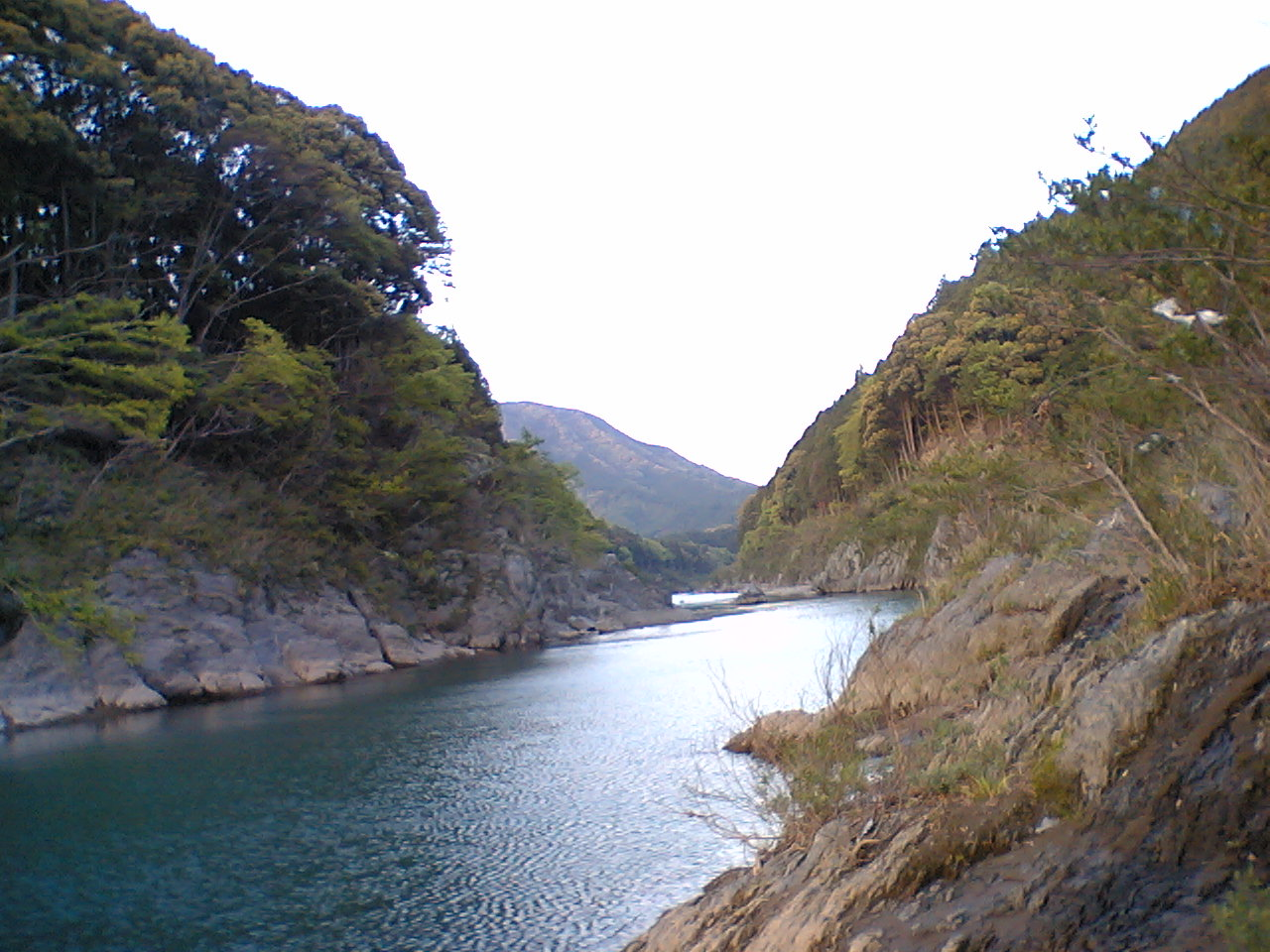
- Miya River in Taiki
- Interactive map of Okuise Miyagawakyō Prefectural Natural Park
- Location: Mie Prefecture, Japan
- Coordinates: 34°17′29″N 136°10′58″E
- Area: 486.67 km^{2} (187.90 sq mi)
- Established: 1 August 1967

Okuise Miyagawakyō Prefectural Natural Park (奥伊勢宮川峡県立自然公園, Okuise Miyagawakyō kenritsu shizen kōen) is a Prefectural Natural Park in central Mie Prefecture, Japan. Established in 1967, the park spans the municipalities of Taiki and Ōdai.

== See also ==
- National Parks of Japan
