= Kii Peninsula =

Largest peninsula on the island of Honshū in Japan

- Peninsula
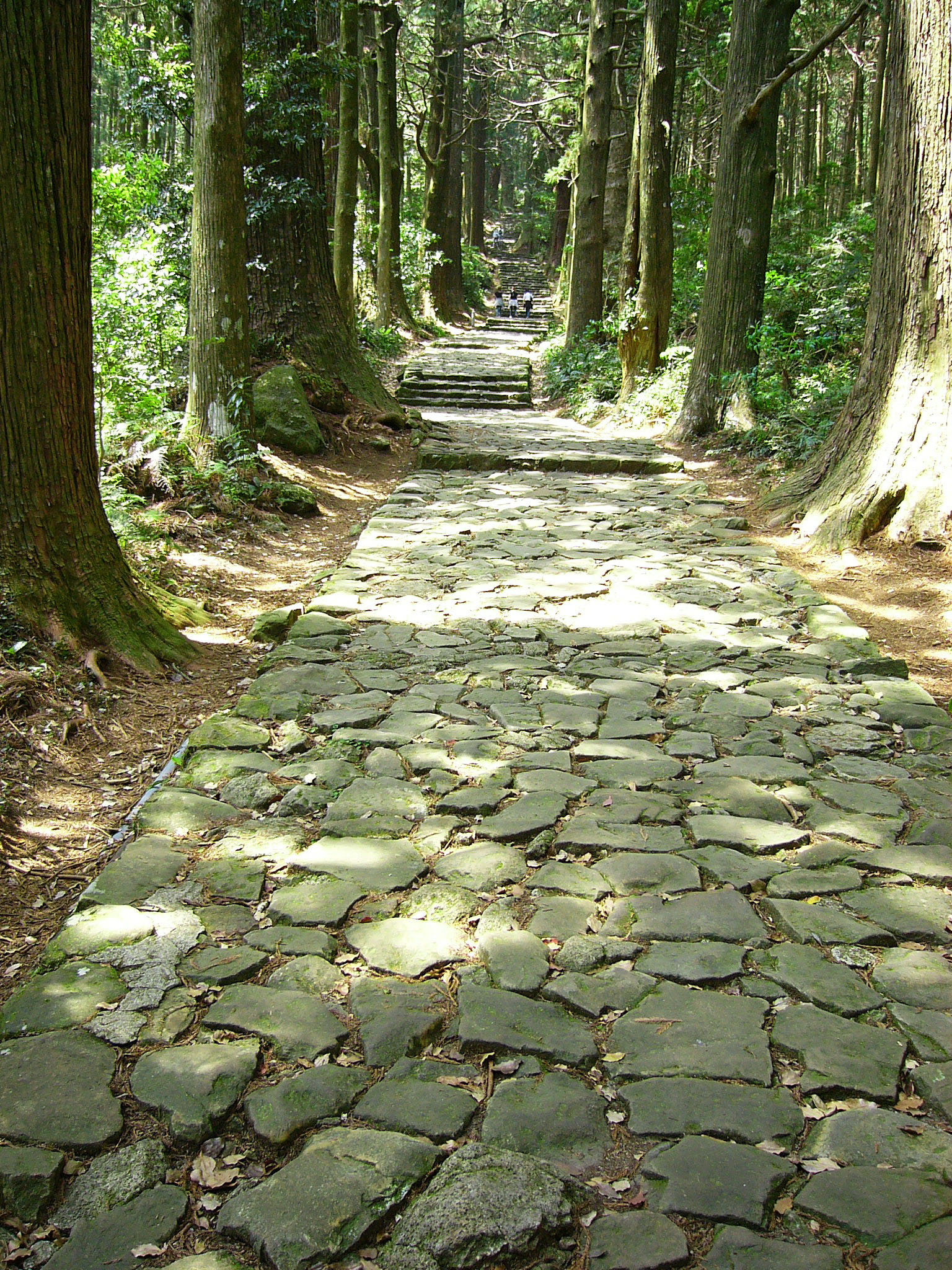
- Interactive map of Kii Peninsula
- Coordinates: 34°18′10″N 135°57′18″E
- Location: Kansai Region: Wakayama Prefecture; Mie Prefecture; Osaka Prefecture; Nara Prefecture
- Rivers: Kinokawa River, Kushida River

The Kii Peninsula (Japanese: 紀伊半島, Hepburn: Kii Hantō) is the largest peninsula on the island of Honshū, located in the Kansai region of Japan. It is named after the ancient Kii Province. The peninsula has long been a sacred place in Buddhism, Shinto, and Shugendo, and many people would visit from all over Japan as part of the Kumano religious practices.

== Overview ==
Location of Kii Peninsula

The area south of the "Central Tectonic Line" is called Nanki (南紀), and is home to reef-like coral communities which are amongst the northernmost in the world (apart from cold-water corals) due to the presence of the warm Kuroshio Current, though these are threatened by global warming and human interference. Because of the Kuroshio's strong influence, the climate of Nankii is the wettest in the Earth's subtropics with rainfall in the southern mountains believed to reach 5 metres (200 in) per year and averaging 3.85 metres (151.6 in) in the southeastern town of Owase, comparable to Ketchikan, Alaska or Tortel in southern Chile. When typhoons hit Japan, the Kii Peninsula is typically the worst affected area and daily rainfalls as high as 940 millimetres (37 in) are known so the Kii Peninsula is often referred to as the "Typhoon Ginza" (after Ginza in Tokyo). The peninsula was severely affected by the 2011 typhoon season, which caused severe damage and many deaths. A significant amount of damage remains today from the 2011 landslides caused by the typhoons.

The natural landscape of the Kii Peninsula is dense temperate rainforest, but the vast majority of forests are monoculture pine plantations which were planted to rebuild after the destruction of World War II. The region is well known for its citrus varieties and orchards. Much of the coast consists of networks of small rias into which flow very steep and rapid streams characterised by numerous high waterfalls. Forestry and fishing were the traditional economic mainstays of the region and remain important even today despite a declining population and labour force. The region is affected by the dual-crises of severe population decline and widespread poverty.

== Location ==
Wakayama Prefecture occupies much of the area, including the entire southern part. To the northwest of Wakayama Prefecture is Osaka Prefecture, whose southern part is on the peninsula. East of Osaka Prefecture is landlocked Nara Prefecture; farther east is Mie Prefecture.

The Seto Inland Sea lies to the west of the Kii Peninsula. To the south and east is the Pacific Ocean and to the north is the valley of the Kiso Three Rivers and Ise Bay.

== Notable places ==
Notable places in the Kii Peninsula include:

- Ise, the location the Ise Shrine and center of pearl production.
- Kumano region, home of the Kumano shrines, the World Heritage Kumano Kodo pilgrimage routes and Nachi Falls. Another name is Muro District, Kii.
- Kushimoto, Wakayama, the southernmost point in Honshū.
- Mount Kōya (or Kōyasan), the headquarters of the Shingon sect of Buddhism.
- Matsusaka, now the center of a major beef-producing area, was formerly the center of the Ise merchants.
- Nara, the ancient capital of the Nara period
- Shirahama, a resort town famous for its beachside onsens.
- Taiji, Wakayama, the birthplace of Japanese traditional whaling.
- Wakayama Prefecture, former home of the Kii (or Kishu) Tokugawa clan. It is the location of the Hinokuma Shrine, which is affiliated to the Grand Shrine of Ise.
- Yoshino District, Nara, a wild area of heavily forested deep mountains, home of the Southern Imperial Court during the Nanboku-chō period.

The Kii Peninsula is the location of a UNESCO World Heritage Site: Sacred Sites and Pilgrimage Routes in the Kii Mountain Range.

In 2004, UNESCO designated three other locations on the Kii Peninsula as World Heritage Sites. They are:

1. Yoshino and Mount Ōmine, mountainous areas in the north of the peninsula.
2. Kumano shrines, three shrines at the southern tip of the peninsula.
3. Mount Kōya, the mountain in the west of the peninsula.

== Transportation ==
- Nanki-Shirahama Airport in Shirahama serves the southern part of the Kii Peninsula.
- The Kisei Main Line connects Wakayama to Mie Prefecture and runs along the peninsula's coastline.
