= Muro District, Kii =

Former district in Japan

- District
- Country: Japan
- Province: Kii

Muro (牟婁郡, Muro no kōri, Muro-gun) was a district located at Kii Province.

Muro District was the largest district located at the southwestern Kii Peninsula and covered half of Kii Province, but in 1879, the district split off into Kitamuro and Minamimuro Districts in Mie Prefecture and Higashimuro and Nishimuro Districts in Wakayama Prefecture.
