= Kii Province =

Former province of Japan

Map of Japanese provinces (1868) with Kii Province highlighted

Kii Province (紀伊国, Kii no Kuni; Japanese pronunciation: [k̟ʲí(.)ì (nò̞ kɯ̈̀.ɲ̟ì)]), or Kishū (紀州; [k̟ʲi̥.ɕɨ́ɨ̀, -ɕɨ̀ɨ̀]), was a province of Japan in the part of Honshū that is today Wakayama Prefecture, as well as the southern part of Mie Prefecture. Kii bordered Ise, Izumi, Kawachi, Shima, and Yamato Provinces. The Kii Peninsula takes its name from this province.

During the Edo period, the Kii branch of the Tokugawa clan had its castle at Wakayama. Its former ichinomiya shrine was Hinokuma Shrine.

The Japanese bookshop chain Kinokuniya derives its name from the province.

== Historical districts ==
- Wakayama Prefecture
  - Ama District (海部郡) - merged with Nagusa District to become Kaisō District (海草郡) on April 1, 1896
  - Arida District (有田郡)
  - Hidaka District (日高郡)
  - Ito District (伊都郡)
  - Naga District (那賀郡) - dissolved
  - Nagusa District (名草郡) - merged with Ama District to become Kaisō District on April 1, 1896
- Mixed
  - Muro District (牟婁郡)
    - Higashimuro District (東牟婁郡) - part of Wakayama Prefecture
    - Kitamuro District (北牟婁郡) - part of Mie Prefecture
    - Minamimuro District (南牟婁郡) - part of Mie Prefecture
    - Nishimuro District (西牟婁郡) - part of Wakayama Prefecture
