= Mie Prefecture =

Prefecture of Japan

Mie Prefecture 三重県
- Prefecture

Japanese transcription(s)
  - Japanese: 三重県
  - Rōmaji: Mie-ken
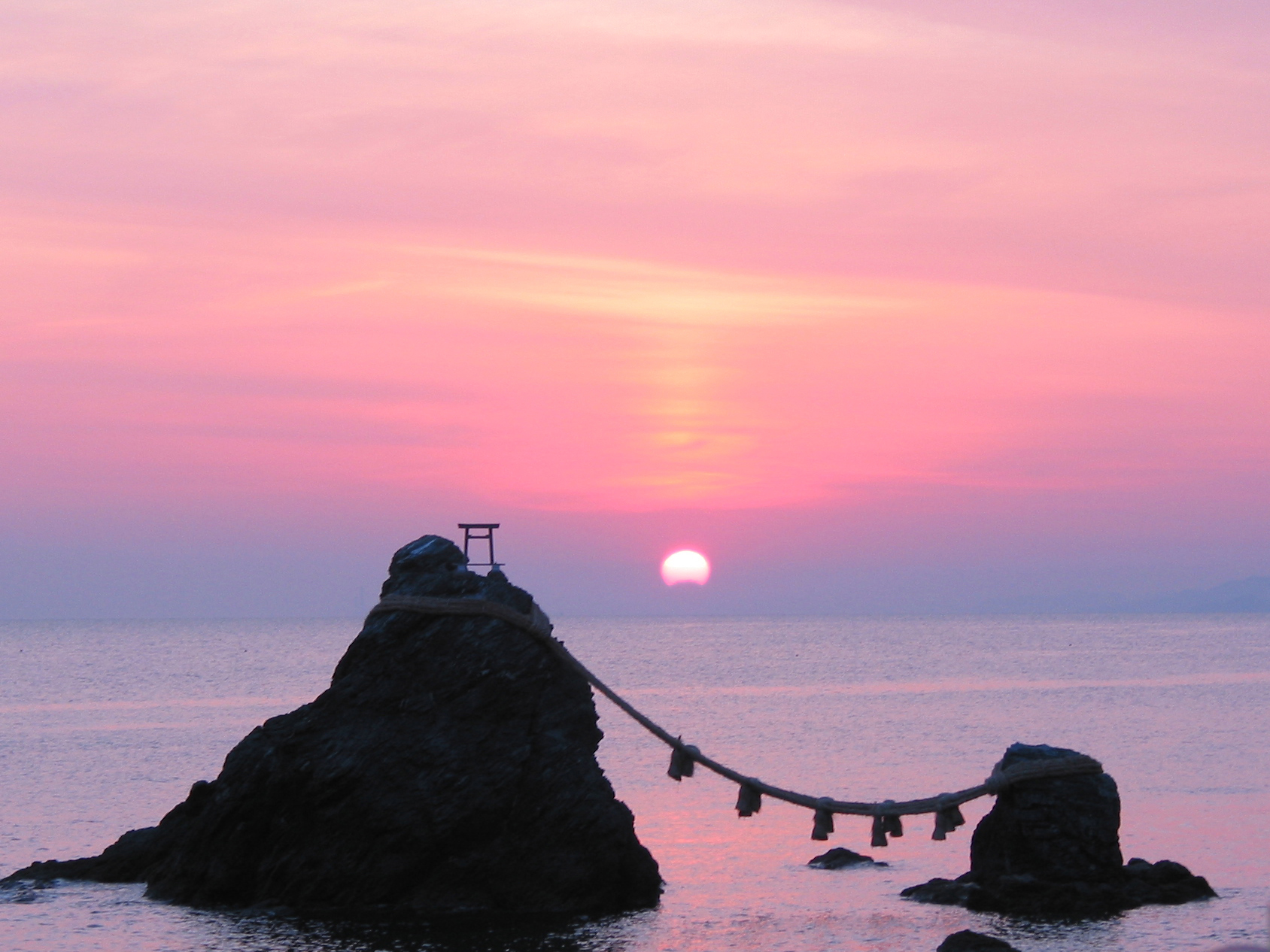
- The pair of Meoto Iwa rocks off the coast of Ise city, Mie Prefecture during sunrise

- Flag Symbol
- Anthem: Mie kenminka
- Coordinates: 34°42′N 136°30′E
- Country: Japan
- Region: Kansai (Tōkai)
- Island: Honshu
- Capital: Tsu
- Largest city: Yokkaichi
- Subdivisions: Districts: 7, Municipalities: 29

Government
  - Governor: Katsuyuki Ichimi

Area
  - Total: 5,774.41 km^{2} (2,229.51 sq mi)
  - Rank: 25th

Population (1 June 2019)
  - Total: 1,781,948
  - Rank: 22nd
  - Density: 308.594/km^{2} (799.255/sq mi)

GDP
  - Total: JP¥ 8,491 billion US$ 62.7 billion (2022)
- ISO 3166 code: JP-24
- Website: www.pref.mie.jp/ ENGLISH/
- Symbols of Japan
- Bird: Snowy plover (Charadrius alexandrinus)
- Fish: Japanese spiny lobster (Panulirus japonicus)
- Flower: Iris (Iris ensata)
- Tree: Japanese cedar (Cryptomeria japonica)

Mie Prefecture (三重県, Mie-ken; Japanese pronunciation: [mʲí.è̞, mʲì.é̞.kè̞ɴ̀]) is a prefecture of Japan located in the Kansai region of Honshu. Mie Prefecture has a population of 1,781,948 (as of 1 June 2019) and has a geographic area of 5,774 square kilometers (2,229 sq mi). Mie Prefecture is bordered by Gifu Prefecture to the north, Shiga Prefecture and Kyoto Prefecture to the northwest, Nara Prefecture to the west, Wakayama Prefecture to the southwest, and Aichi Prefecture to the east.

Tsu is the capital and Yokkaichi is the largest city of Mie Prefecture, with other major cities including Suzuka, Matsusaka, Ise, and Kuwana. Mie Prefecture is located on the eastern coast of the Kii Peninsula, forming the western side of Ise Bay which features the mouths of the Kiso Three Rivers. Mie Prefecture is a popular tourism destination home to Nagashima Spa Land, Suzuka International Racing Course, and some of the oldest and holiest sites in Shinto, the traditional religion of Japan, including the Ise Grand Shrine and the Tsubaki Grand Shrine.

== History ==
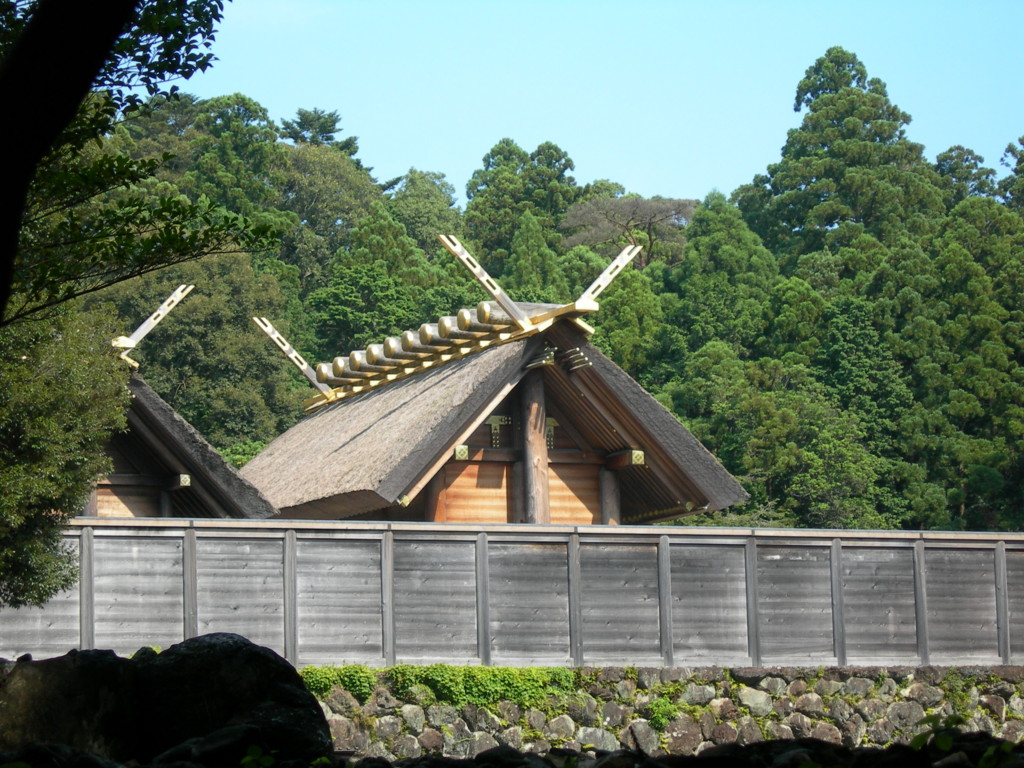
Ise Shrine

Until the Meiji Restoration, the area that is now Mie Prefecture was made up of Ise Province, Shima Province, Iga Province, and part of Kii Province.

Evidence of human habitation in Mie dates back more than 10,000 years. During the Jōmon and Yayoi periods, agricultural communities began to form along the river and coastal areas of the region. Ise Shrine is said to have been established during the Yayoi period, and in the 7th century the Saikū Imperial Residence was built in what is now Meiwa Town to serve as both a residence and administrative centre for the Saiō, an Imperial Princess who served as High Priestess of Ise Shrine.

During the Edo period, the area now known as Mie Prefecture consisted of several feudal domains, each ruled by an appointed lord. Transport networks, including the Tokaido and Ise Roads, were built. Port towns such as Ohminato, Kuwana and Anōtsu, posting stations and castle towns flourished. Pilgrimages to Ise Shrine also became very popular.

After the Meiji Restoration, the former provinces of Ise, Shima and Iga as well as a portion of eastern Kii, were organized and reorganized repeatedly. In 1871, the area from the Kiso Three Rivers in the north to present-day Tsu became Anōtsu Prefecture, and the area south of that became Watarai Prefecture. In 1872, the Anōtsu prefectural seat moved from Tsu to Yokkaichi, and the prefecture itself was renamed Mie. For a variety of reasons, including the strong likelihood that Mie would eventually merge with Watarai, the prefectural seat returned to Tsu the following year, and Mie Prefecture took its present-day form in 1876, when it merged with its southern neighbor.

The name Mie supposedly was taken from a comment about the region made by Yamato Takeru on his way back from conquering the eastern regions.

In 1959, many people died as parts of Mie were devastated by the Ise-wan Typhoon, the strongest typhoon to hit Japan in recorded history. Crops were destroyed, sea walls ruined, roads and railways damaged and a substantial number of people were injured or left homeless.

In May 2016, the city of Shima hosted the 42nd G7 summit, the third summit without the presence of Russia.

== Geography ==
Physical map of Mie prefecture

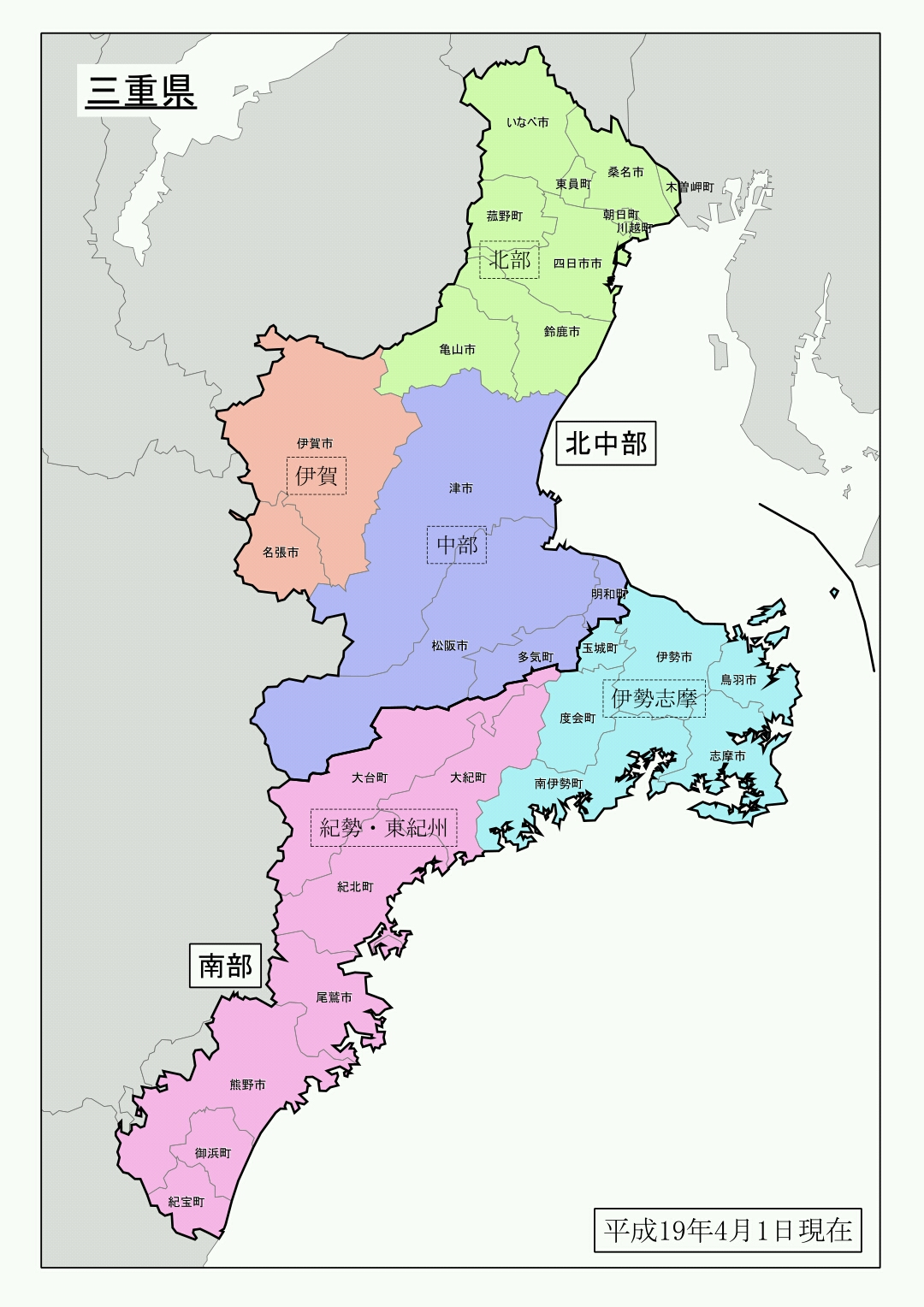
Regional division of Mie as used by the Japan Meteorological Agency: The primary division is between North/Central and South, the former being further subdivided into North, Central and Iga, the latter into Ise-Shima and KiSei/East Kishū; Ise/Sei-shū, Shima/Shi-shū, Iga/I-shū and Kii/Ki-shū are the four Ritsuryō provinces that are partly or entirely part of modern Mie.

Mie Prefecture forms the eastern part of the Kii Peninsula, and borders on Aichi, Gifu, Shiga, Kyoto, Nara, and Wakayama. It is considered part of the Kansai and Tōkai regions due to its geographical proximity to Aichi Prefecture and its cultural influence from Kansai, such as the fact that Kansai dialect is spoken in Mie. Traditionally, though, the Iga region of Mie is considered to have always been a part of Kansai.

Mie Prefecture measures 170 km (106 mi) from north to south, and 80 km (50 mi) from east to west, and includes five distinct geographical areas:

1. the north-west of Mie consists of the Suzuka Mountains
2. along the coast of Ise Bay from the Aichi border to Ise City lies the Ise Plain, where most of the population of Mie live
3. south of the Ise Plain is the Shima Peninsula
4. bordering Nara in the central-west is the Iga Basin
5. running from central Mie to its southern borders is the Nunobiki Mountainous Region.

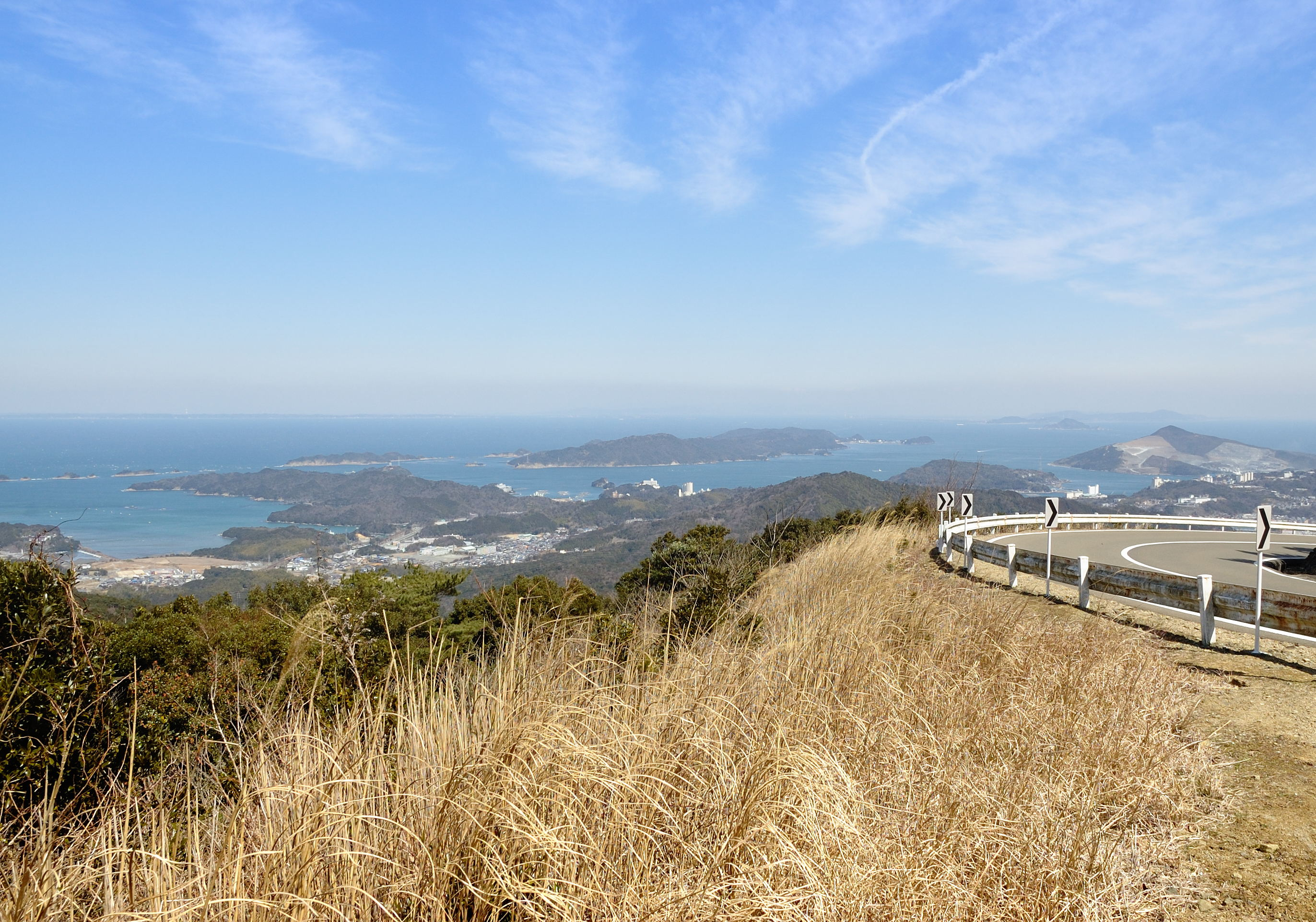
Mie coastline, near Toba

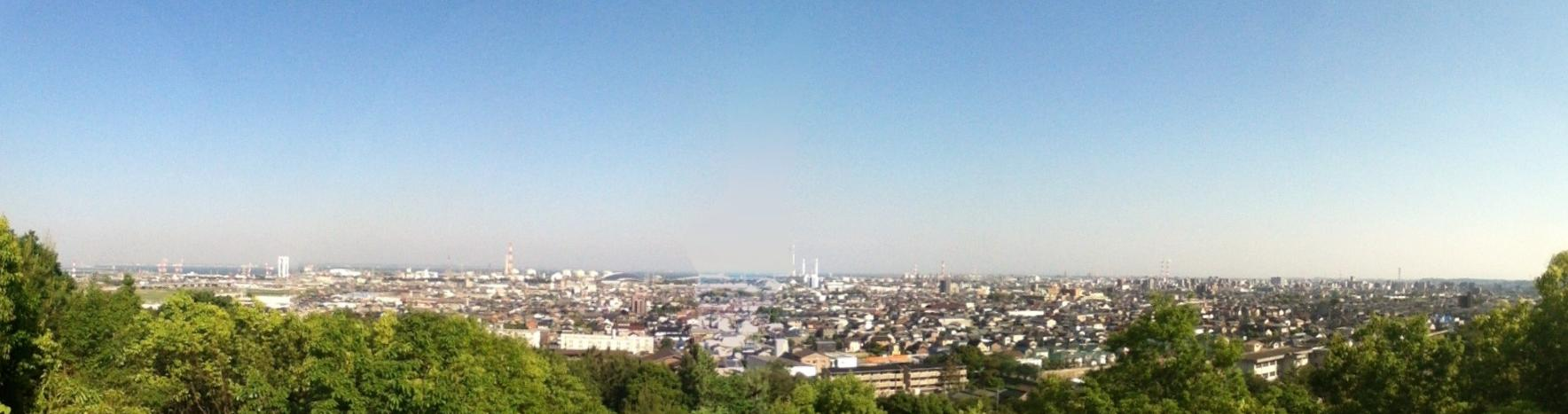
Yokkaichi

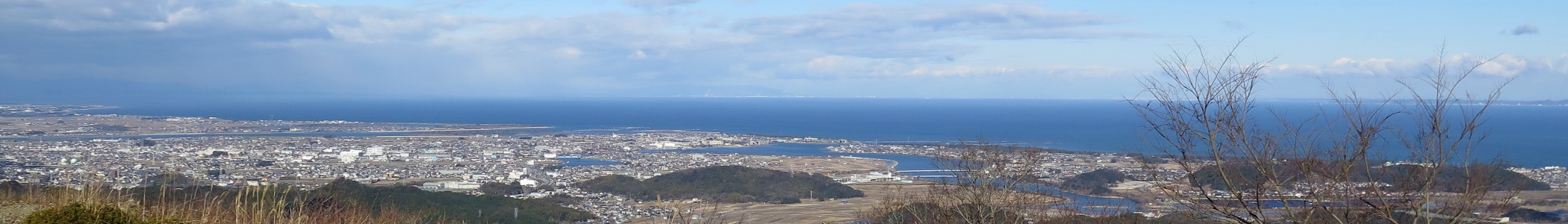
Ise

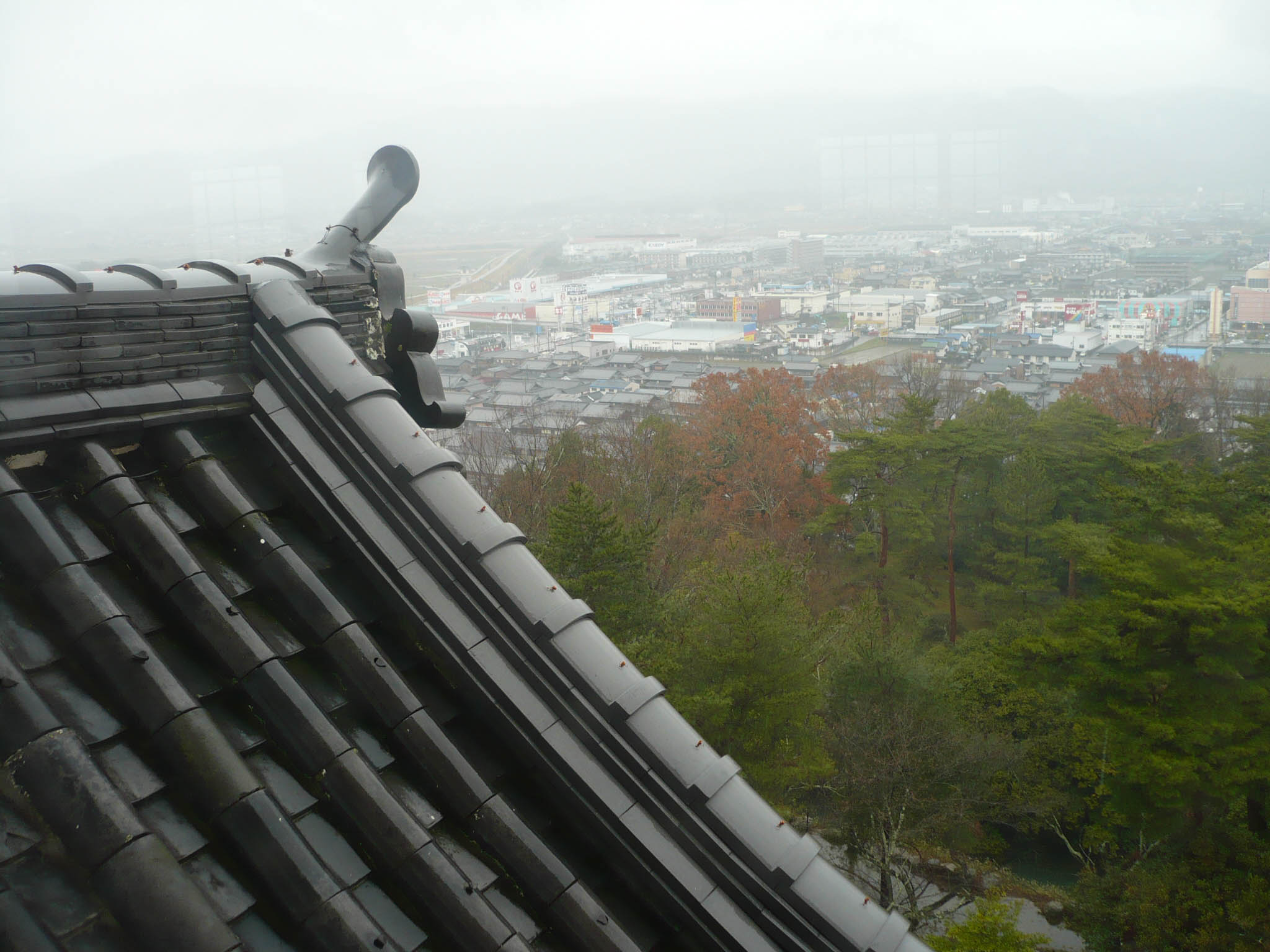
Iga

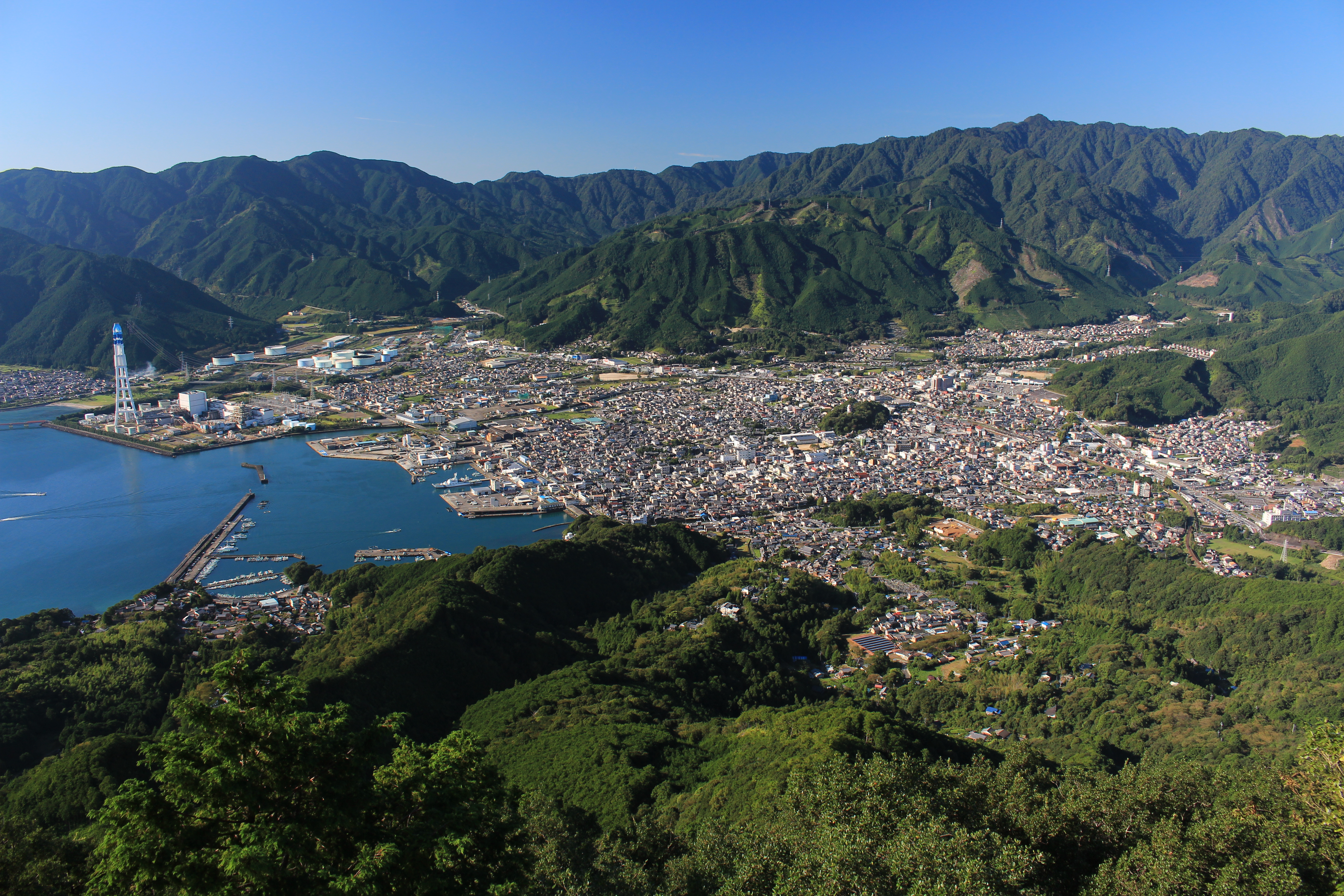
Owase

Mie has a coastline that stretches 1,094.9 km (680.3 mi) and, as of 2000, Mie's 5,776.44 km^{2} (2,230.30 sq mi) landmass is 64.8 percent forest, 11.5 percent agriculture, 6 percent residential area, 3.8 percent roads, and 3.6 percent rivers. The remaining 10.3 percent are not classified.

The Ise Plain has a relatively moderate climate, averaging 14 to 15 °C (57 to 59 °F) for the year. The Iga Basin has more daily temperature variance and averages temperatures 1 to 2 degrees cooler than the Ise Plain. Southern Mie, south of the Shima Peninsula, has a warmer Pacific marine climate, with Owase Region having one of the heaviest rainfall figures for all of Japan.

As of 31 March 2019, 36% of the total area of the prefecture comprised designated Natural Parks, namely:

- Akame Ichishikyō Prefectural Natural Park
- Ise-no-Umi Prefectural Natural Park
- Ise-Shima National Park
- Kahadakyō Prefectural Natural Park
- Murō-Akame-Aoyama Quasi-National Park
- Okuise Miyagawakyō Prefectural Natural Park
- Suigō Prefectural Natural Park
- Suzuka Quasi-National Park
- Yoshino-Kumano National Park

=== Municipalities ===
Since 2006, Mie consists of 29 municipalities: 14 cities and 15 towns.

Flag, name w/o suffix	Full name			District (-gun)	Area (km^{2})	Population	Map	Local public entity code (w/o checksum)
Flag, name w/o suffix	Japanese	transcription	translation	District (-gun)	Area (km^{2})	Population	Map	Local public entity code (w/o checksum)
Iga	伊賀市	Iga-shi	Iga City	–	558.17	95,137		24216
Inabe	いなべ市	Inabe-shi	Inabe City	–	219.58	45,589		24214
Ise	伊勢市	Ise-shi	Ise City	–	208.52	123,129		24203
Kameyama	亀山市	Kameyama-shi	Kameyama City	–	190.91	50,230		24210
Kumano	熊野市	Kumano-shi	Kumano City	–	373.35	17,727		24212
Kuwana	桑名市	Kuwana-shi	Kuwana City	–	136.68	139,587		24205
Matsusaka	松阪市	Matsusaka-shi	Matsusaka City	–	623.64	165,166		24204
Nabari	名張市	Nabari-shi	Nabari City	–	129.77	78,190		24208
Owase	尾鷲市	Owase-shi	Owase City	–	192.71	17,953		24209
Shima	志摩市	Shima-shi	Shima City	–	179.67	53,056		24215
Suzuka	鈴鹿市	Suzuka-shi	Suzuka City	–	194.46	196,835		24207
Toba	鳥羽市	Toba-shi	Toba City	–	107.34	19,227		24211
Tsu (capital)	津市	Tsu-shi	Tsu City	–	711.11	279,304		24201
Yokkaichi	四日市市	Yokkaichi-shi	Yokkaichi City	–	206.44	306,107		24202
Asahi	朝日町	Asahi-chō	Asahi Town	Mie	5.99	9,941		24343
Kawagoe	川越町	Kawagoe-chō	Kawagoe Town	Mie	8.73	14,999		24344
Komono	菰野町	Komono-chō	Komono Town	Mie	106.89	40,289		24341
Kihō	紀宝町	Kihō-chō	Kihō Town	Minami-Muro (South Muro)	79.66	11,454		24562
Mihama	御浜町	Mihama-chō	Mihama Town	Minami-Muro (South Muro)	88.28	9,089		24561
Kihoku	紀北町	Kihoku-chō	Kihoku Town	Kita-Muro (North Muro)	257.01	17,885		24543
Kisosaki	木曽岬町	Kisosaki-chō	Kisosaki Town	Kuwana	15.72	6,730		24303
Meiwa	明和町	Meiwa-chō	Meiwa Town	Taki	40.92	22,726		24442
Ōdai	大台町	Ōdai-chō	Ōdai Town	Taki	362.94	9,345		24443
Taki	多気町	Taki-chō	Taki Town	Taki	103.06	14,846		24441
Minamiise	南伊勢町	Minami-Ise-chō	South Ise Town	Watarai	242.98	14,217		24472
Taiki	大紀町	Taiki-chō	Taiki Town	Watarai	233.54	9,543		24471
Tamaki	玉城町	Tamaki-chō	Tamaki Town	Watarai	40.94	15,280		24461
Watarai	度会町	Watarai-chō	Watarai Town	Watarai	134.97	8,534		24470
Tōin	東員町	Tōin-chō	Tōin Town	Inabe	22.66	25,552		24324
Mie	三重県	Mie-ken	Mie Prefecture	–	5,774.41	1,781,948		24000 ISO: JP-24

=== Mergers ===
When the modern municipalities were introduced in 1889, Mie initially consisted of 336 municipalities: 1 (by definition: district-level) city and 21 districts with 18 towns and 317 villages. With the Great Shōwa mergers of the 1950s, the number of municipalities in Mie had dropped to 88 by 1956. The Great Heisei mergers of the 2000s reduced the total from 69 to 29 between 2000 and 2006.

== Economy ==
Mie Prefecture has traditionally been a link between east and west Japan, thanks largely to the Tokaido and Ise Pilgrimage Roads. Traditional handicrafts such as Iga Braid, Yokkaichi Banko Pottery, Suzuka Ink, Iga Pottery and Ise Katagami flourished. With 65% of the prefecture consisting of forests and with over 1,000 km (600 mi) of coastline, Mie has a long been associated with forestry and seafood industries. Mie also produces tea, beef, cultured pearls and fruit, mainly mandarin oranges. Food production companies include Azuma Foods.

Northern Mie is home to a number of manufacturing industries, mainly transport machinery manufacturing (vehicles and ships) and heavy chemical industries such as oil refineries. As well as this, Mie Prefecture is expanding into more advanced industries including the manufacture of semiconductors and liquid crystal displays. In Suzuka, the Honda Motor Company maintains a factory established in 1960 that built the Honda Civic, as well as other vehicles.

== Demographics ==
Mie prefecture population pyramid in 2020

Mie Prefecture Demographics (as of 2014)
Total population	1,820,491
Male population	886,362
Female population	934,129
Population aged under 15	240,263
Population aged 15 to 64	1,076,257
Population aged over 64	491,779
Households	721,344
Population density (per km^{2})	315.3

== Culture ==
=== Universities ===
- Ise
  - Kogakkan University
- Matsusaka
  - Mie Chukyo University
- Suzuka
  - Suzuka International University
  - Suzuka National College of Technology
  - Suzuka University of Medical Science
- Toba
  - Toba National College of Maritime Technology
- Tsu
  - Mie Prefectural College of Nursing
  - Mie University
- Yokkaichi
  - Yokkaichi Nursing and Medical Care University
  - Yokkaichi University

== Transportation ==
=== Rail ===
- JR Central
  - Kansai Line (Nagoya-Kameyama)
  - Kisei Line
  - Meishō Line
  - Sangu Line
- JR West
  - Kansai Line (Kameyama-Nara)
  - Kusatsu Line (Tsuge Station)
- Kintetsu
  - Nagoya Line
  - Osaka Line
  - Yamada Line
  - Toba Line
  - Shima Line
  - Yunoyama Line
  - Uchibe Line
  - Hachioji Line
  - Suzuka Line
- Yoro Railway
- Iga Railway
- Ise Railway
- Sangi Railway

=== Road ===
Distribution of regional license plates in Mie: Much of the prefecture still uses 三重 (Mie), and there is only one prefecturewide MLIT vehicle registration centre for all of Mie, in Tsu City; but with the introduction of regional plates without a separate licensing office since the 2000s, there are now three additional regional identifiers: 四日市 (Yokkaichi) for Yokkaichi City alone, 鈴鹿 (Suzuka) in Suzuka City and Kameyama City, and 伊勢志摩 (Ise-Shima) used for seven municipalities on the Shima peninsula.

==== Expressways and toll roads ====
- East Meihan Expressway
- Ise Bayside Expressway
- Ise Expressway
- Ise Futami Toba Road
- Ise Shima Skyline
- Kisei Expressway
- Kumano Owase Road
- Meihan National Highway
- Second Meishin Expressway

==== National highways ====
- Route 1
- Route 23 (Ise-Yokkaichi-Nagoya-Gamagori-Toyohashi)
- Route 25 (Meihan Highway)
- Route 42
- Route 163
- Route 164 (Yokkaichi)
- Route 165
- Route 167 (Shima-Toba -Ise)
- Route 258
- Route 301
- Route 311
- Route 365
- Route 421
- Route 422
- Route 425 (Owase-Totsukawa-Gobo)
- Route 477

=== Ports ===
- Matsuzaka Port - Hydrofoil ferry route to Centrair
- Toba Port - Ferry route to Ira Cape
- Tsu Port - Hydrofoil ferry route to Centrair airport (Chubu International Airport)
- Yokkaichi Port - International and domestic container and goods hub port

=== Air ===
In terms of air travel, the prefecture is served by Chubu International Airport.

== Tourism ==
The Pokemon Ambassodor

=== Notable places ===
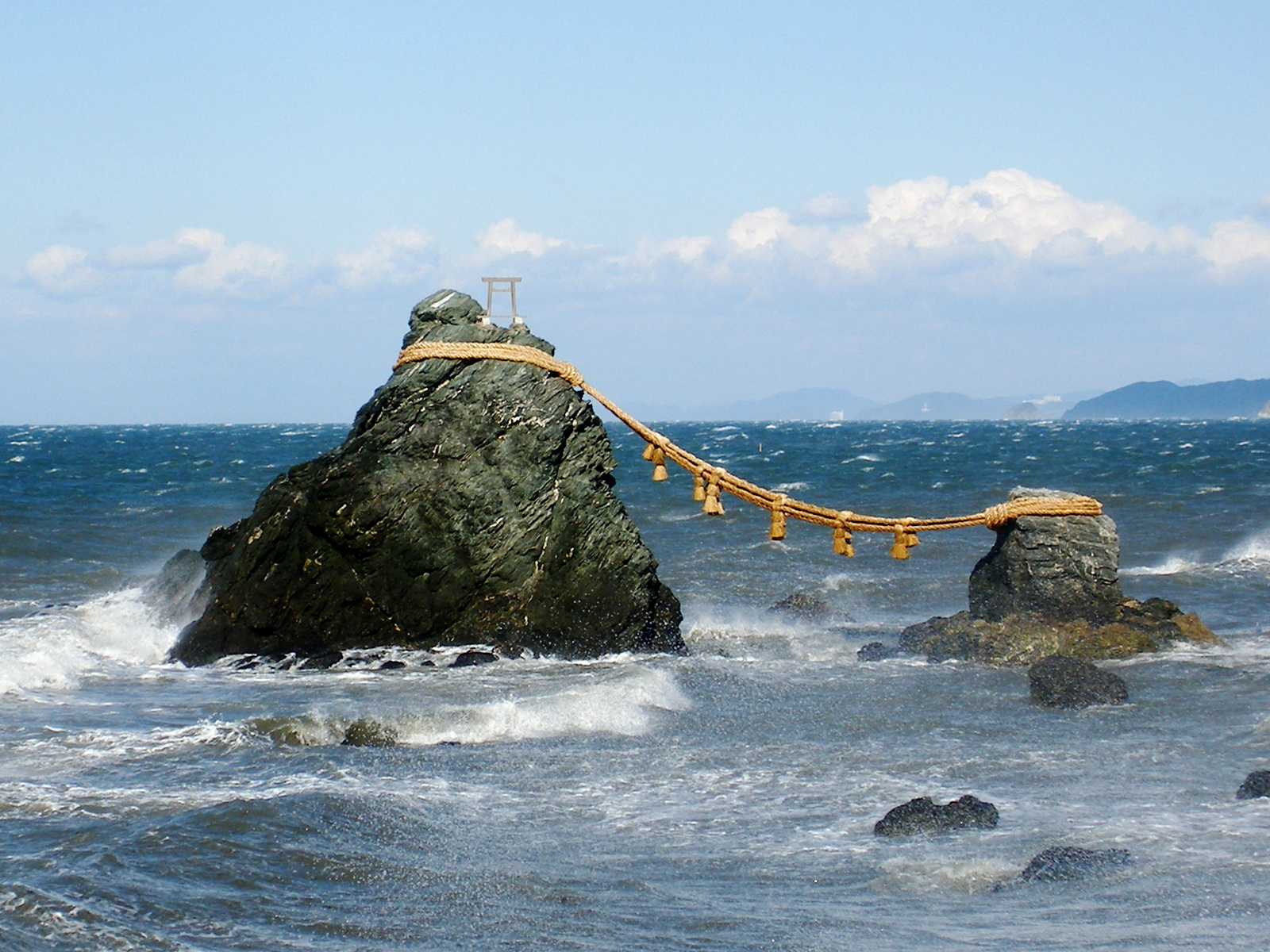
Meoto Rocks in Ise Bay, Ise

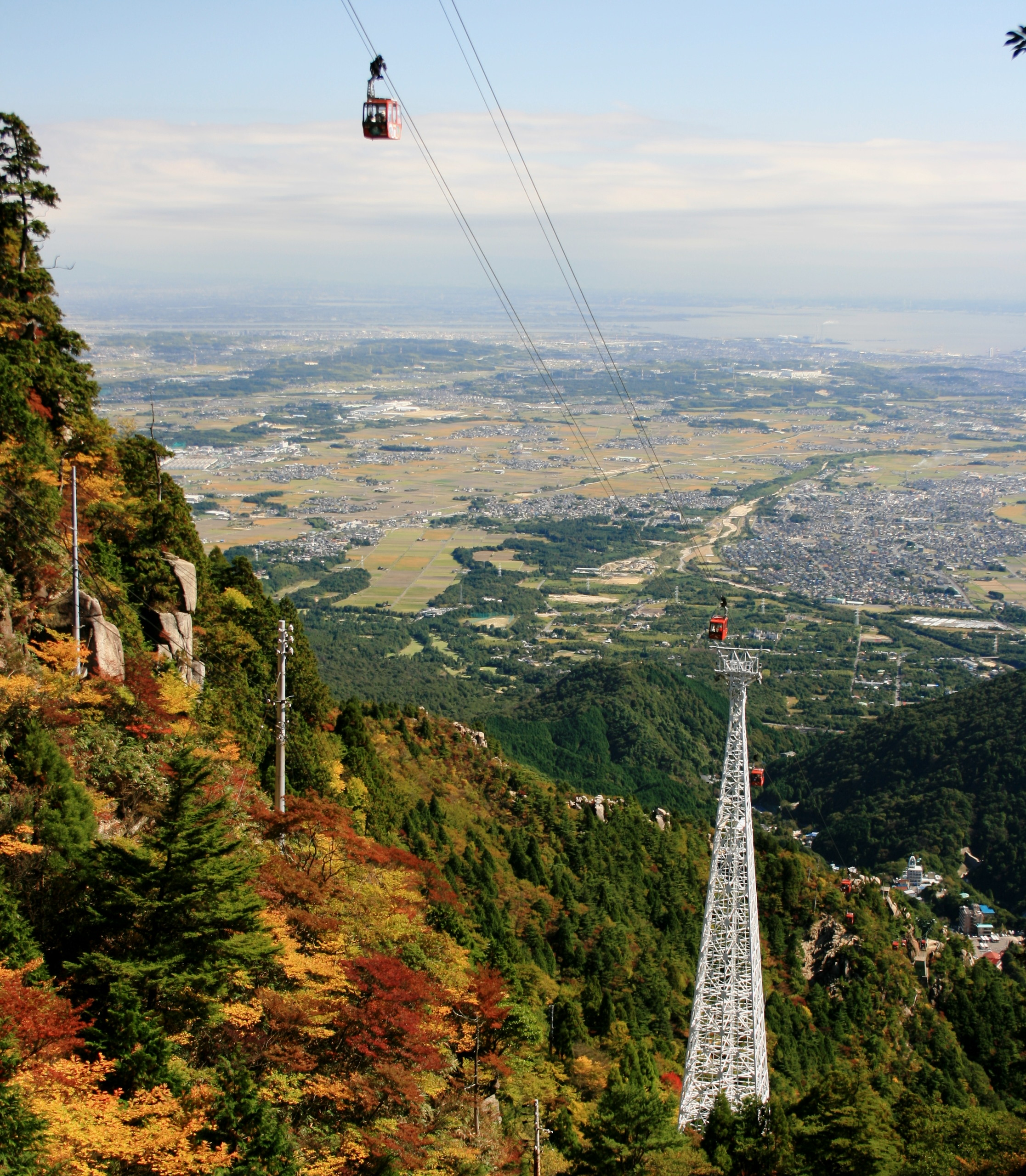
Mount Gozaisho and cable-car in Komono

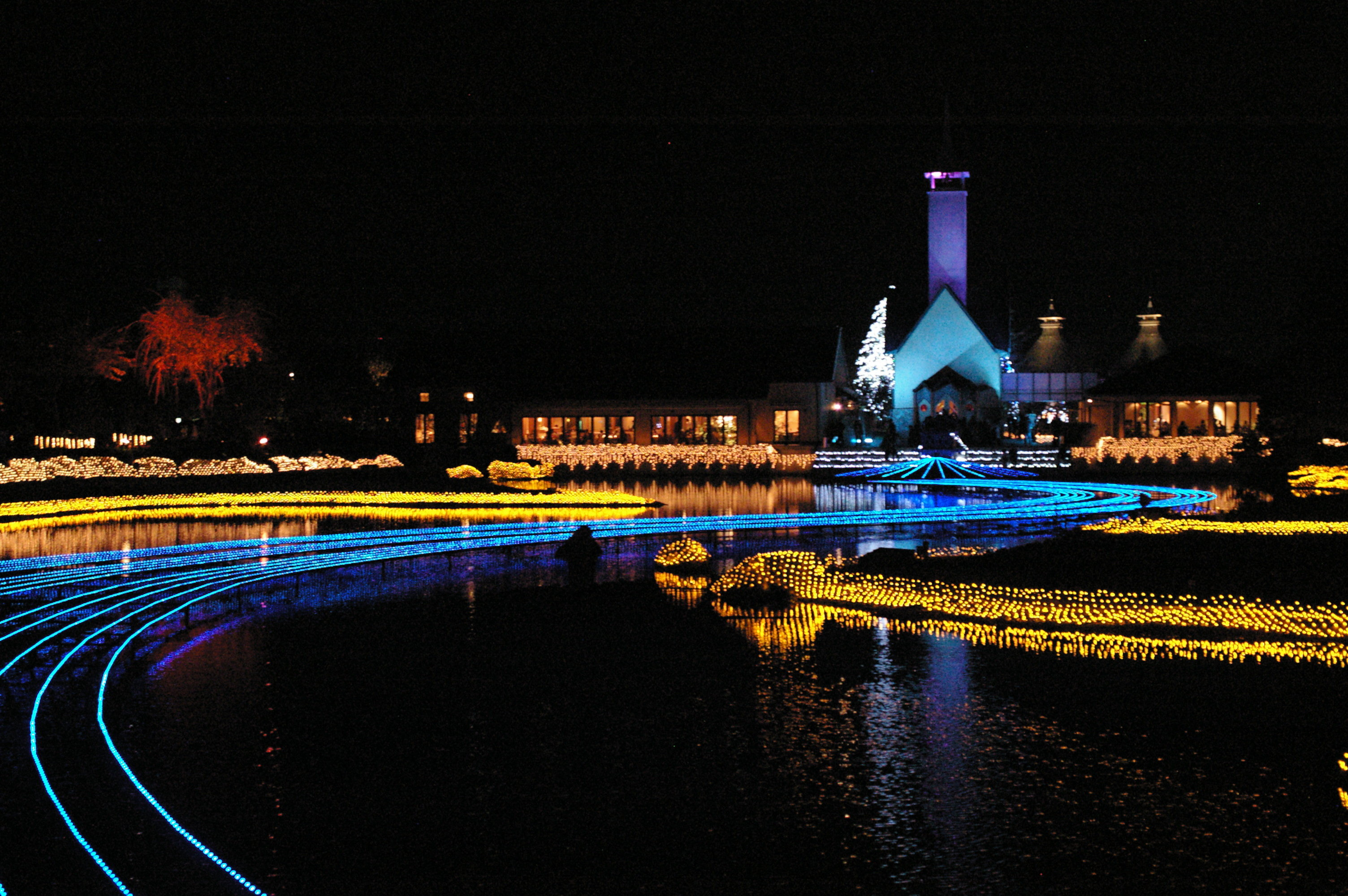
Winter Illumination event in Nabana Village Park, Kuwana

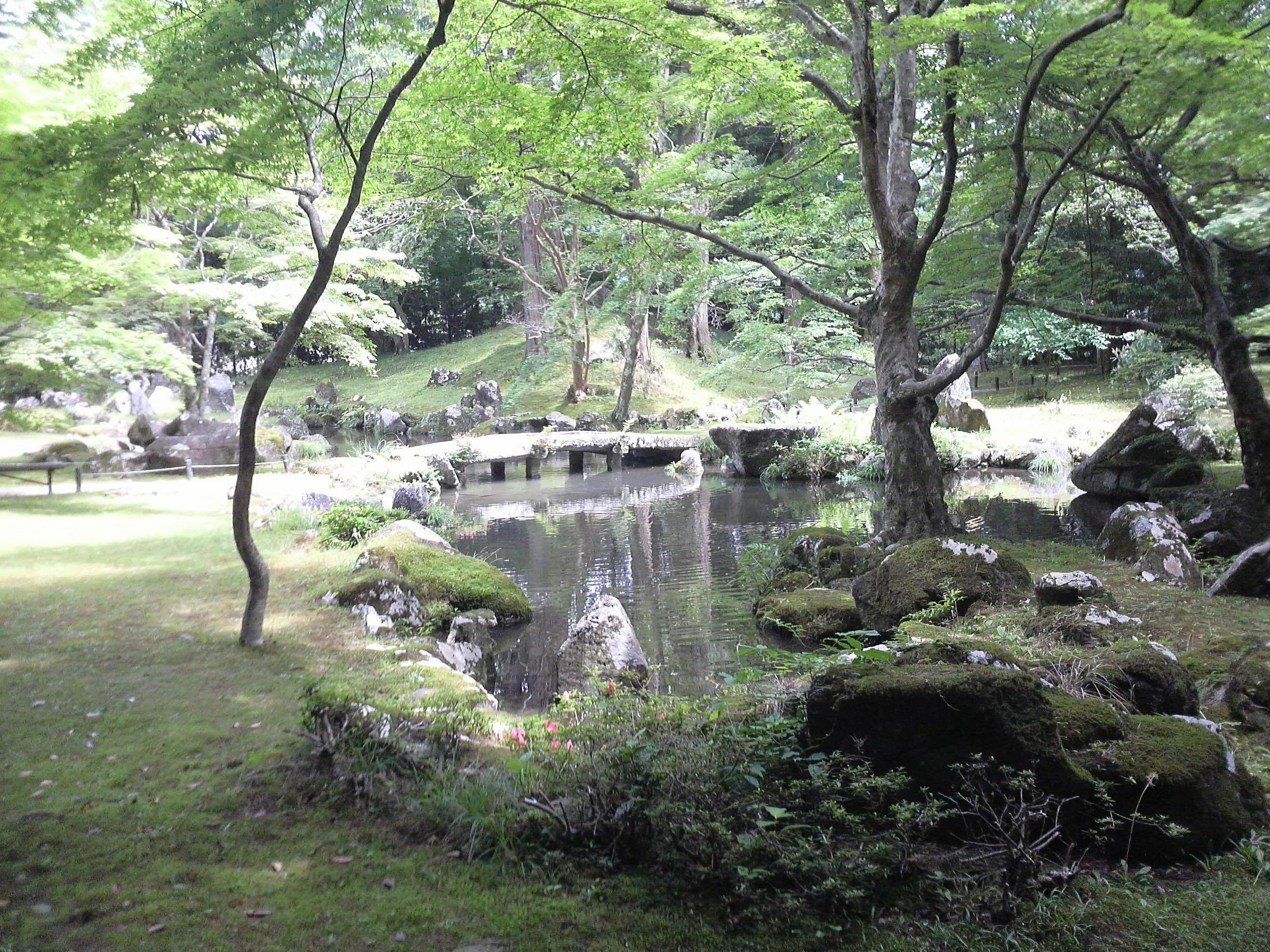
Kitabatake Jōkan garden

- Ise Grand Shrine - Japan's holiest Shinto shrine.
- Tsubaki Grand Shrine - Japan's oldest Shinto shrine.
- Kumano Kodō - World Heritage Site. Ancient road in southern Mie once used by pilgrims.
- Iga-Ueno - Birthplace of the ninja and home to the Iga Ninja Museum.
- Ise-Shima National Park
- Yoshino-Kumano National Park
- Tage Kitabatakeshi Yakata - Tage Kitabatake clan fortified residence, one of the Continued Top 100 Japanese Castles in 2017.
- Sakakibara Onsen - Famous onsen near Tsu, considered to be the 3rd best onsen in Japan.
- Yunoyama Onsen - Famous onsen near Yokkaichi that sits atop Mount Gozaisho.
- Nagashima Spa Land - One of the largest amusement parks in Japan, located in Kuwana.
- Toba Aquarium
- Mijumaru / Oshawott Park (2 locations) - a park and children's playground built in honor of Oshawott - the Mie Prefecture's Pokémon Ambassador.
- Mikimoto Pearl Island - Museum in Toba that is dedicated to Kōkichi Mikimoto, inventor of pearl cultivation.
- The Wedded Rocks of Okitama Shrine in Futami (now part of the city of Ise)
- Suzuka Circuit - Japan's most famous motor racetrack.
- Saikū - Site of Heian Imperial residence, with modern museum and reconstructed Heian building.
- Sagawa Memorial Museum of Shinto and Japanese Culture, Kogakkan University, a university museum close to the Ise Grand Shrine.
- A large Sonic the Hedgehog statue in the town of Iga can be found near Kanonji temple which has been the topic of discussion amongst gaming publications.

=== Notable citizens ===
- Aoi, guitarist of The GazettE
- Daikokuya Kōdayū, a Japanese castaway who spent eleven years in Russia
- Daisuke Kishio, voice actor
- Die, guitarist of Dir En Grey
- Hakaru Hashimoto, medical scientist
- Hiroshi Okuda, Chairman of Toyota, chairman of the Japan Business Federation
- Hiroyuki Ito, a video game designer working for Square Enix
- Jun Maeda, a Japanese writer and co-founder of the software company Key
- Kana Nishino, singer
- Katsuya Okada, former Foreign Minister, and DPJ Secretary General
- Keiichi Yabu, relief pitcher for the San Francisco Giants
- Tetsuya Yamagami, Japanese Navy veteran responsible for the assassination of Shinzo Abe
- Ken Hirai, Japanese R&B and pop singer
- Kenta Nishimoto, professional badminton player
- Kota Sasaki, racing driver
- Mashiho Takata, a member of Korean-Pop boy group Treasure
- Matsuo Bashō, the most famous poet of the Edo period, renowned for his haiku
- Mikimoto Kōkichi, founder of the cultured pearl industry
- Mitski Miyawaki, Japanese-American singer-songwriter
- Mitsui Takatoshi, founder of the Mitsui Group
- Miwa Asao, beach volleyball player
- Mizuki Noguchi, the gold medalist in the women's marathon event in the 2004 Summer Olympics
- Norinaga Motoori, a Japanese scholar of Kokugaku during the Edo period
- Pocky, Japanese YouTuber
- Ranpo Edogawa, famous mystery novelist
- Yasujirō Ozu, famous filmmaker
- Yukio Ozaki, a politician said to be the father of Japan's constitutional government

=== Famous products ===
- Akafuku, a sweet made with mochi and sweet red bean paste
- Ito Ranch, a matsusaka beef farm in the region
- Matsusaka beef
- Spiny lobster, known as Ise ebi (伊勢えび), named after the old province

== Government and politics ==
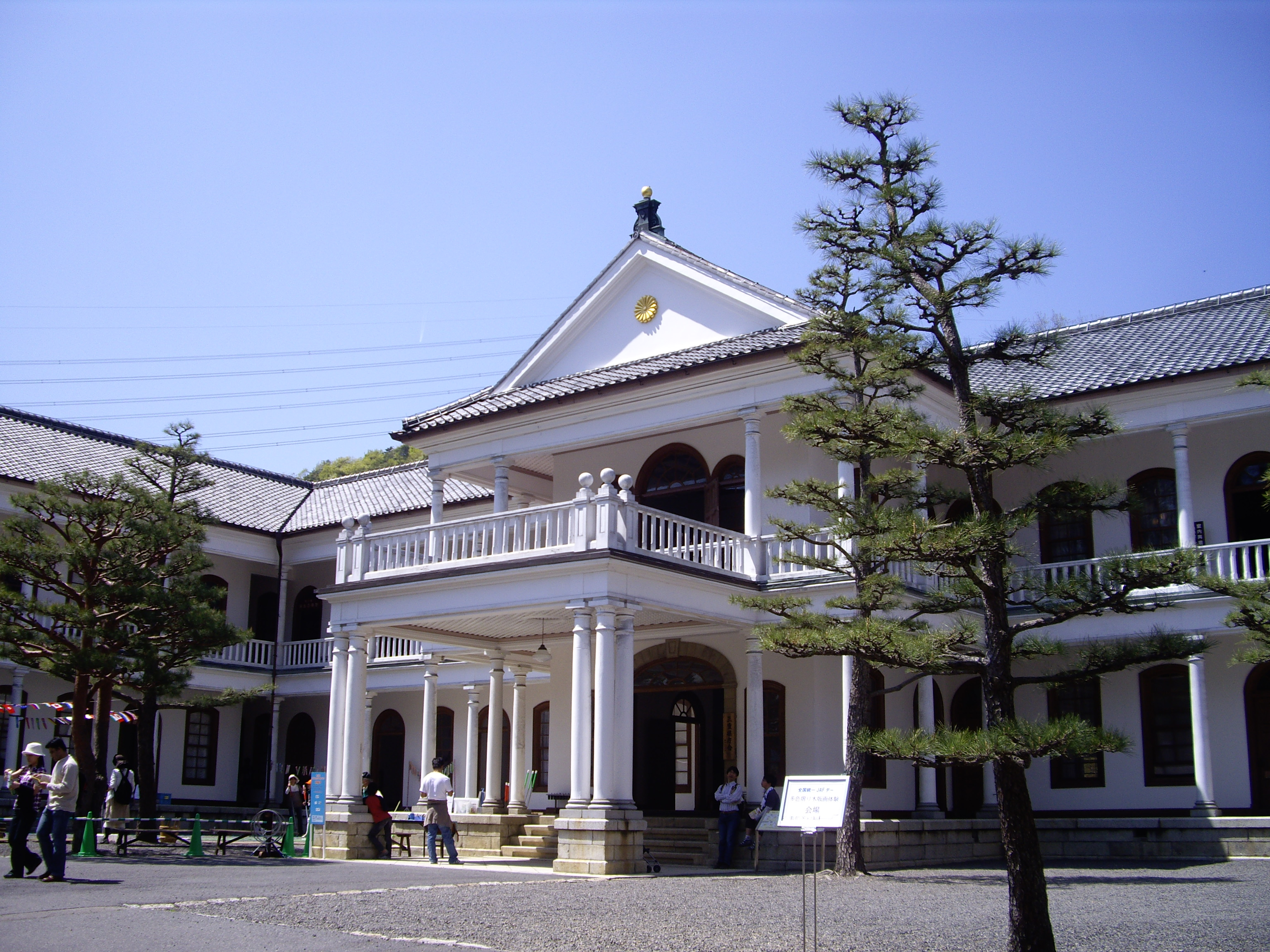
The Meiji-era, former (1879–1964) building of the Mie prefectural government has been reconstructed in the "Meiji village" museum in Aichi.

The prefectural government was briefly moved to Yokkaichi Town in Mie District in 1872 (hence the name Mie), but the capital moved back to Anotsu, Anō District (present-day Tsu City) in 1873 and has remained there since. Ignoring small changes through cross-prefectural municipal mergers, neighbourhood transfers and coastline variations, Mie reached its present borders in 1876 when it absorbed Watarai Prefecture. After the modern reactivation of districts in 1878/79, Mie consisted of 21 districts (merged down to 15 in the 1890s). The first prefectural assembly was elected in March 1879 and convened in April. In the introduction of modern cities, towns and villages in 1889, Anotsu became district-independent as Tsu City and the districts were subdivided into 18 towns and 317 villages (see the List of mergers in Mie Prefecture for changes since then).

As in all prefectures except Okinawa, the governor of Mie is directly elected since 1947. The prefectural assembly has 51 members. Both prefectural elections in Mie are currently held as part of unified local elections. In the last round in 2019, governor Eikei Suzuki easily won a third term with broad support from LDP, Shinsei Mie (see below) and Kōmeitō, against only one, JCP-supported challenger; Suzuki was originally elected narrowly in 2011 as centre-right candidate against centre-left supported Naohisa Matsuda, former mayor of Tsu City. In the Mie assembly, the LDP is strongest party; but it is distributed across several parliamentary groups, and the strongest group is Shisei Mie (新政みえ; "Renewal Mie") around members of several local parties of former Democrats.

In the National Diet, Mie is represented by four directly elected members of the House of Representatives and two (one per class) in the House of Councillors. After the national elections of 2016, 2017 and 2019, Mie's directly elected delegation was evenly split between Liberal Democrats (HR district #1: Norihisa Tamura, #4: Noriyo Mitsuya, HC 2019–25 class: Yūmi Yoshikawa) and ex-Democrats (HR #2: Masaharu Nakagawa, #3: Katsuya Okada, HC 2016–22 class: Hirokazu Shiba) in both houses of the Diet.

=== Sister states ===
- Henan, China
- São Paulo, Brazil
- Valencia, Spain
