= Matsuzaka =

Matsuzaka(松坂) may refer to:

== People ==
- Daisuke Matsuzaka, Japanese baseball player
- Keiko Matsuzaka, Japanese actress
- Teruhisa Matsusaka, Japanese-American mathematician

== Places ==
- Matsusaka, a Japanese city in the Mie Prefecture

== Buildings ==
- Matsuzaka Castle, Matsuzaka, Japan
- Matsusaka Station, Matsuzaka, Japan
- Higashi-Matsusaka Station, Matsuzaka, Japan

== Education ==
- "Matsuka University", better known as Mie Chukyo University

== Food ==
- Matsusaka beef, a brand of wagyu beef
