= Mie 4th district =

Japan House of Representatives constituency

- Parliamentary constituency for the Japanese House of Representatives
- Numbered map of Mie Prefecture single-member districts
- Prefecture: Mie
- Proportional District: Tōkai
- Electorate: 288,980

Current constituency
- Created: 1994
- Seats: One
- Party: Liberal Democratic
- Representatives: Eikei Suzuki
- Municipalities: Ise, Kumano, Owase, Toba, Shima, Kitamuro District, Minamimuro District, Taki District and Watarai District

Mie 4th district (三重県第4区, Mie-ken dai-yonku or simply 三重4区, Mie-yonku ) is a single-member constituency of the House of Representatives in the national Diet of Japan located in Mie Prefecture.

== Areas covered ==
=== Since 2017 ===
- Ise
- Kumano
- Owase
- Toba
- Shima
- Kitamuro District
- Minamimuro District
- Taki District
- Watarai District

=== 2013–2017 ===
- Part of Tsu
- Matsusaka
- Taki District

=== 1994–2013 ===
- Matsusaka
- Hisai
- Ichishi District
- Iinan District
- Taki District

== List of representatives ==
Election	Representative	Party	Notes
1996	Norihisa Tamura	Liberal Democratic	
2000	Norihisa Tamura	Liberal Democratic	
2003	Norihisa Tamura	Liberal Democratic	
2005	Norihisa Tamura	Liberal Democratic	
2009	Tetsuo Morimoto	Democratic	
2012	Norihisa Tamura	Liberal Democratic	
2014	Norihisa Tamura	Liberal Democratic	
2017	Norio Mitsuya	Liberal Democratic	
2021	Eikei Suzuki	Liberal Democratic	
2024	Eikei Suzuki	Liberal Democratic	
2026	Eikei Suzuki	Liberal Democratic	

== Election results ==
2026
Party	Candidate	Votes	%	±%
LDP	Eikei Suzuki	106,718	66.46	▲6.27
DPP	Daisuke Fujita	43,016	40.31	
JCP	Tamihide Nakagawa	10,846	6.75	▲0.18
Registered electors		277,284		
Turnout		160,580	59.38	▲1.36
LDP hold				

2024
Party	Candidate	Votes	%	±%
LDP	Eikei Suzuki	96,619	60.2	▼12.2
CDP	Yō'ichirō Aonuma	53,360	33.2	▲10.0
JCP	Tamihide Nakagawa	10,538	6.6	▲2.2
Registered electors		283,235		
Turnout			58.02	▼2.74
LDP hold				

2021
Party	Candidate	Votes	%	±%
Liberal Democratic (endorsed by Komeito)	Eikei Suzuki	128,753	72.36	
CDP (endorsed by SDP, DPP)	Shūji Bōno	41,311	23.22	New
Communist	Tamihide Nakagawa	7,882	4.43	
Majority		87,442	49.14	
Registered electors		297,002		
Turnout			60.76	▲0.41
LDP hold				

2017
Party	Candidate	Votes	%	±%
Liberal Democratic (endorsed by Komeito)	Norio Mitsuya (Mie 5th incumbent)	99,596	54.04	
Kibō no Tō	Daisuke Fujita	68,978	37.43	New
Communist	Miyoshi Taninaka	15,724	8.53	
Majority		30,618	16.61	
Registered electors		312,991		
Turnout			60.35	▲4.64
LDP hold				

2014
Party	Candidate	Votes	%	±%
Liberal Democratic (endorsed by Komeito)	Norihisa Tamura (incumbent)	94,725	74.50	
Communist	Hōnen Matsuki	32,429	25.50	
Majority		62,296	49.00	
Registered electors		241,010		
Turnout			55.71	▼7.79
LDP hold				

2012
Party	Candidate	Votes	%	±%
Liberal Democratic (endorsed by Komeito)	Norihisa Tamura (PR seat incumbent)	86,131	57.53	
Democratic (endorsed by PNP)	Tetsuo Morimoto (incumbent)	51,943	34.70	
Communist	Tamihide Nakagawa	11,636	7.77	N/A
Majority		34,188	22.83	
Registered electors		242,526		
Turnout			63.50	▼9.09
LDP gain from Democratic				

2009
Party	Candidate	Votes	%	±%
Democratic	Tetsuo Morimoto (PR seat incumbent)	87,824	50.35	
Liberal Democratic	Norihisa Tamura (incumbent) (won PR seat)	84,583	48.49	
Happiness Realization	Yūzo Takara	2,018	1.16	New
Majority		3,241	1.86	
Registered electors		243,958		
Turnout			72.59	▲1.08
Democratic gain from LDP				

2005
Party	Candidate	Votes	%	±%
Liberal Democratic	Norihisa Tamura (incumbent)	91,832	53.81	
Democratic	Tetsuo Morimoto (won PR seat)	78,821	46.19	
Majority		13,011	7.62	
Registered electors		243,086		
Turnout			71.51	▲5.34
LDP hold				

2003
Party	Candidate	Votes	%	±%
Liberal Democratic	Norihisa Tamura (incumbent)	94,379	60.38	
Democratic	Chuji Ito (PR seat incumbent) (won PR seat)	51,168	32.74	
Communist	Emi Okano	10,761	6.88	
Majority		43,211	27.64	
Registered electors		241,304		
Turnout			66.17	▼0.88
LDP hold				

2000
Party	Candidate	Votes	%	±%
Liberal Democratic	Norihisa Tamura (incumbent)	97,276	62.78	
Democratic	Kengo Kishida	42,890	27.68	New
Communist	Emi Okano	14,789	9.54	
Majority		54,386	35.10	
Registered electors		236,985		
Turnout			67.05	▼5.12
LDP hold				

1996
Party	Candidate	Votes	%	±%
Liberal Democratic	Norihisa Tamura	78,383	47.75	New
New Frontier	Akihiko Noro	75,795	46.17	New
Communist	Takeshi Makioka	9,974	6.08	New
Majority		2,588	1.58	
Registered electors		232,111		
Turnout			72.17	
LDP win (new seat)				
