= Japanese Railways =

Japanese Railways may refer to:

- Japanese Government Railways
- Japanese National Railways

== See also ==
- Japan Railways Group
- Japanese railway signals
- Nippon Railway
- Rail transport in Japan
