= Rokken rail accident =

1956 railway incident in Japan

Coordinates: 34°37′03″N 136°30′27″E

Rokken railway accident
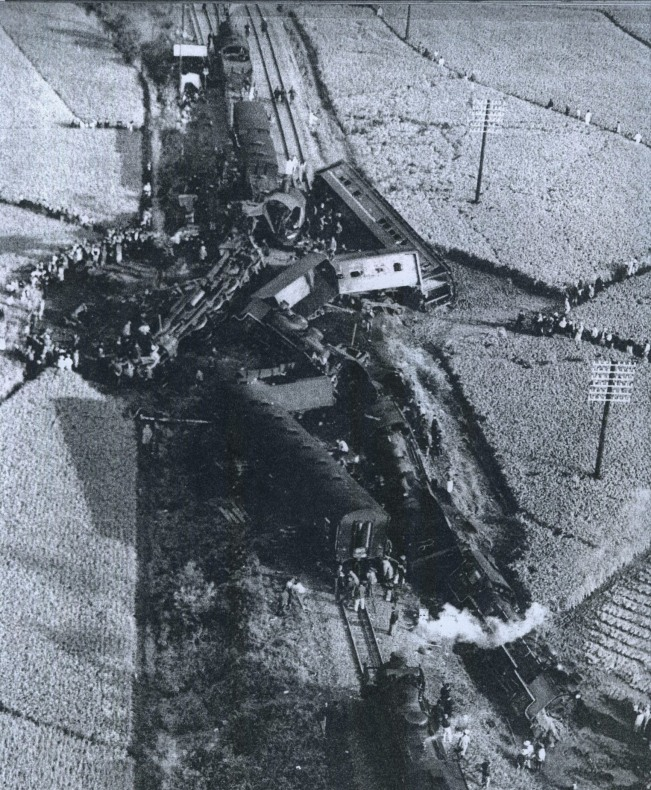
- Aftermath of the collision

Details
- Date: October 15, 1956; 69 years ago 18:22
- Location: Rokken Station
- Country: Japan
- Line: Sangu Line
- Operator: Japanese National Railways
- Incident type: Derailment and collision
- Cause: Signal error

Statistics
- Trains: 2
- Deaths: 42
- Injured: 94

The Rokken railway accident (六軒事故, Rokken jiko) occurred on October 15, 1956, when two passenger trains collided and derailed at Rokken Station on the Japan National Railways (JNR) Sangu Line in Matsusaka, Mie Prefecture. The accident led to the implementation of improvements in the Japanese rail signaling system.

== Accident ==
On the day of the accident, JNR Limited Express 243, consisting of a JNR Class C51 coal-fired steam locomotive with nine passengers cars was en route from Nagoya Station to Toba Station. Per the train’s driver and fireman, the signal at Rokken Station indicated that the train had right-of-way, and was proceeding with caution; therefore the train passed the platform of Rokken Station at a speed of 58 km/h. However, at the end of the platform, the driver found that the token was missing, and that the signal displayed “stop”, which indicated that it was unsafe to proceed due to oncoming traffic. He applied the emergency brakes, but overran the safety barrier, causing the train to derail, with some of the passenger carriages partially on the rails of the main line.

Only 20 seconds later, JNR Limited Express 246, consisting of a JNR Class C57 steam locomotive and eleven passenger cars bound for Nagoya collided with the derailed portion at a speed of 55 km/h.

A total of 42 passengers were killed and 94 injured. Some of the victims suffered from severe burns due to steam from the ruptured boilers. Many of the victims were senior high school students on a field trip from Tokyo.

== Response ==
The investigation report was inconclusive, as it could not be determined if the accident was a result of a delay in signal operation by the train staff or a misreading of the signals by the train driver. The courts found both parties guilty of negligence, with the train driver of JNR Limited Express 243 receiving the heavier penalty. Contributing factors included a delay in the schedule for JNR Limited Express 246 due to festivals at Ise Grand Shrine, an inadequate emergency braking system, and the inability of Rokken Station to send an emergency signal warning to JNR Limited Express 246 after the derailment. After the accident, the JNR began to install an audible stop signal to the driver, and to place more emphasis of the development of an ATS with automation of signal devices and use of colored lamps for signaling.
