= Tetsuo Morimoto =

Japanese politician

- 森本 哲生
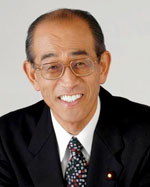
- Official portrait, 2011

Member of the House of Representatives
- In office 11 September 2005 – 16 November 2012
- Preceded by: Multi-member district
- Succeeded by: Norihisa Tamura
- Constituency: Tōkai PR (2005–2009); Mie 4th (2009–2012)

Member of the Mie Prefectural Assembly
- In office 1999–2005
- Constituency: Matsusaka City

Personal details
- Born: 29 September 1949 (age 77) Iinan, Mie, Japan
- Party: Democratic
- Education: Tsu City College

Tetsuo Morimoto (森本 哲生, Morimoto Tetsuo; born 29 September 1949) is a former Japanese politician of the Democratic Party of Japan, who served as a member of the House of Representatives in the Diet (national legislature) from 2005 to 2012.

== Early life ==
A native of Iinan, Mie and graduate of Tsu City College, he worked at the government of the town of Iinan from 1968 to 1998.

== Political career ==
He was elected to the first of his two terms in the assembly of Mie Prefecture in 1999 and to the House of Representatives for the first time in 2005.
