= Rokken Station (Mie) =

Railway station in Matsusaka, Mie Prefecture, Japan

Rokken Station 六軒駅
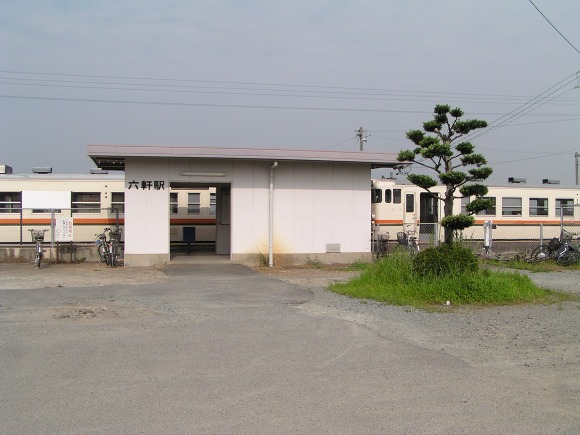
- Rokken Station

General information
- Location: Ozu-cho, Matsusaka-shi, Mie-ken 515-2114; Japan
- Coordinates: 34°37′03″N 136°30′27″E
- Operator: JR Tōkai
- Line: ■ Kisei Main Line
- Distance: 29.1 km from Kameyama
- Platforms: 2 side platforms
- Connections: Bus terminal

History
- Opened: January 10, 1894

Passengers
- FY2019: 121 daily
Location
- Location within Mie Prefecture Location within Japan

Rokken Station (六軒駅, Rokken-eki) is a railway station is a passenger railway station in located in the city of Matsusaka, Mie Prefecture, Japan, operated by Central Japan Railway Company (JR Tōkai).

== Lines ==
Rokken Station is served by the Kisei Main Line, and is 29.1 rail kilometers from the terminus of the line at Kameyama Station.

== Station layout ==
The station consists of two opposed side platforms connected by a footbridge.There is no station building, but only a small weather shelter built onto the platform.

=== Platforms ===
1	■ Kisei Main Line	For Kameyama, Yokkaichi, Kuwana, Nagoya
2	■ Kisei Main Line	For Matsusaka, Iseshi, Toba, Shingū

== Adjacent stations ==
«	Service	»
Central Japan Railway Company (JR Central)
Kisei Main Line
Rapid "Mie": Does not stop at this station
Limited Express "Nanki": Does not stop at this station
Takachaya	Local	Matsusaka

== History ==
The Sangū Railway started service with its initial line between Tsu Station and Miyagawa Station on December 31, 1893. However, Rokken Station was not completed by that date, and only began operations on January 10, 1894. The line was nationalized on October 1, 1907, becoming the Sangu Line of the Japanese Government Railways (JGR) on October 12, 1909.

On October 15, 1956, a crash involving two passenger trains occurred at the station. The Rokken rail accident killed 42 people. The station was transferred to the control of the Japan National Railways (JNR) Kisei Main Line on July 15, 1959. All freight operations were discontinued in 1962. The station has been unattended since December 21, 1983. The station was absorbed into the JR Central network upon the privatization of the JNR on April 1, 1987.

== Passenger statistics ==
In fiscal 2019, the station was used by an average of 121 passengers daily (boarding passengers only).

== Surrounding area ==
- Matsusaka Municipal Mikumo Junior High School
- Mie Prefecture Central Wholesale Market

== See also ==
- List of railway stations in Japan
