= Tsu City College =

Coordinates: 34°44′55″N 136°30′42″E

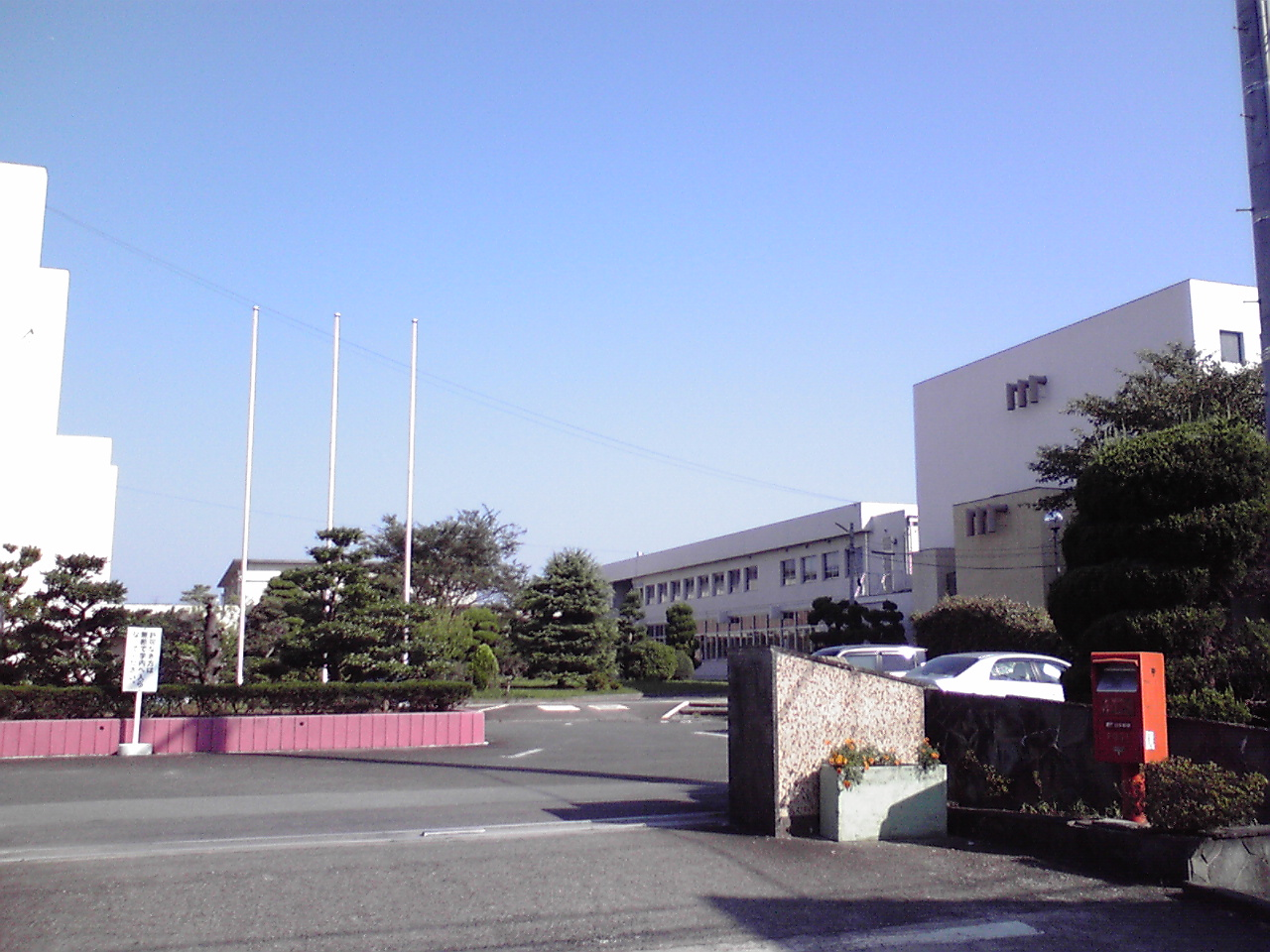
Main Gate of Tsu City College

Tsu City College 津市立三重短期大学 (Tsu shi Mie tanki daigaku, Tsu City Mie Junior College) is a public junior college in Tsu, Mie, Japan. It was founded in 1952.

== Alumni ==
- Tetsuo Morimoto - politician
