= Higashi-Matsusaka Station =

Railway station in Matsusaka, Mie Prefecture, Japan

Higashi-Matsusaka Station 東松阪駅
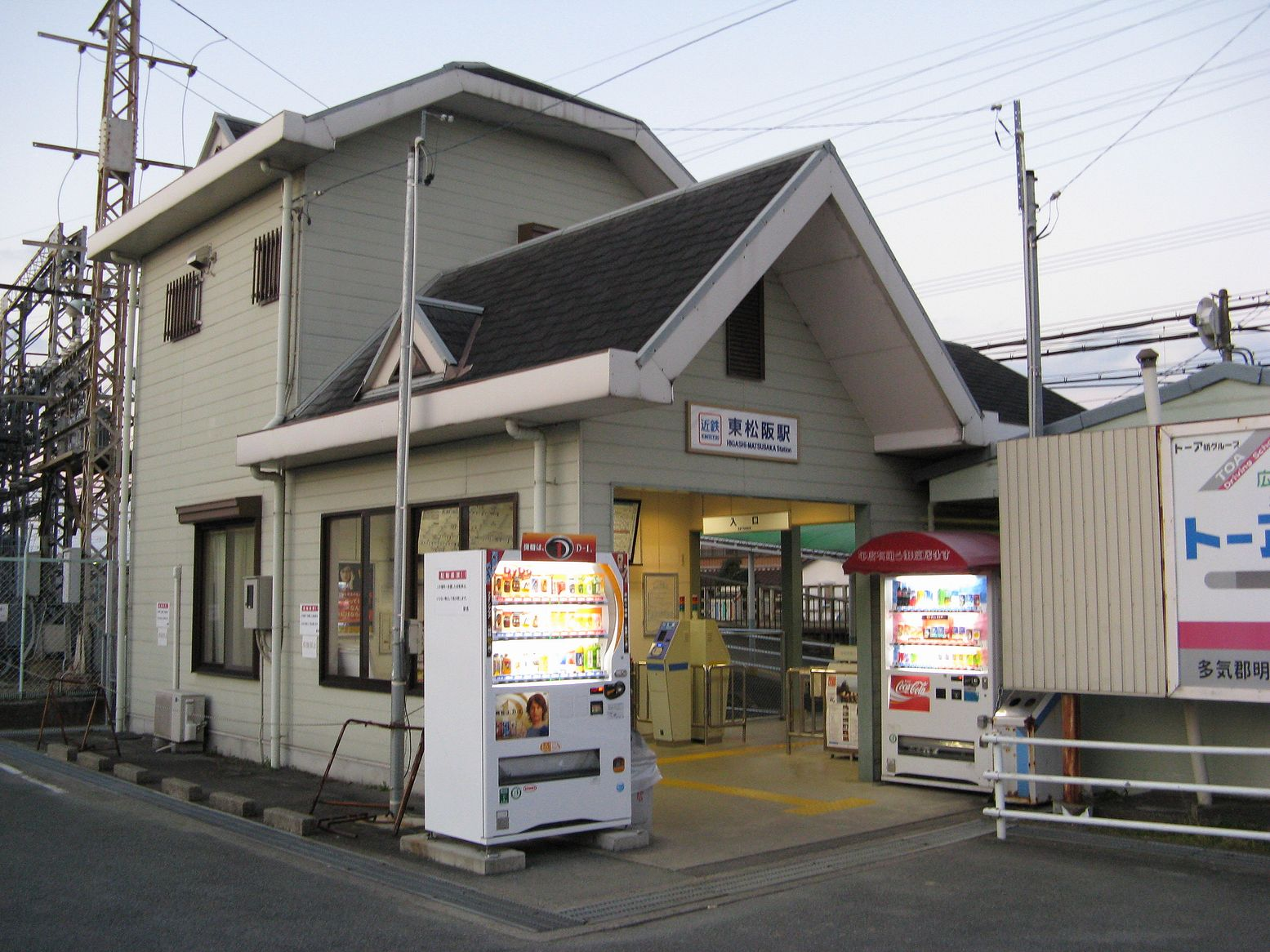
- Higashi-Matsusaka Station

General information
- Location: 353-1 Otsu-cho Hisachi, Matsusaka-shi, Mie-ken 515-0031; Japan
- Coordinates: 34.5655°N 136.5460°E
- Operator: Kintetsu Railway
- Line: Yamada Line
- Distance: 10.0 km from Ise-Nakagawa
- Platforms: 2 side platforms
- Connections: Bus terminal

Other information
- Station code: M65
- Website: Official website

History
- Opened: March 27, 1930

Passengers
- FY2019: 1101 daily
Location
- Location within Mie Prefecture Location within Japan

Higashi-Matsusaka Station (東松阪駅, Higashi-Matsusaka-eki) is a passenger railway station located in the city of Matsusaka, Mie Prefecture, Japan, operated by the private railway operator Kintetsu Railway.

== Lines ==
Higashi-Matsusaka Station is served by the Yamada Line, and is located 10.0 rail kilometers from the terminus of the Yamada Line at Ise-Nakagawa Station.

== Station layout ==
The station consists of two opposed side platforms connected by a level crossing. The station is unattended.

=== Platforms ===
1	■ Yamada Line	for Ujiyamada, Toba and Kashikojima
2	■ Yamada Line	for Matsusaka,Ise-Nakagawa

== Adjacent stations ==
«	Service	»
Yamada Line
Matsusaka	Local	Kushida

== History ==
Higashi-Matsusaka Station opened on March 27, 1930, as a station on the Sangu Express Electric Railway. On March 15, 1941, the line merged with Osaka Electric Railway to become a station on Kansai Express Railway's Yamada Line. This line in turn was merged with the Nankai Electric Railway on June 1, 1944, to form Kintetsu. The station was closed on June 1, 1945, but was reopened on March 14, 1946.

== Passenger statistics ==
In fiscal 2019, the station was used by an average of 1101 passengers daily (boarding passengers only).

== Surrounding area ==
- Mie Chūkyō University
- Matusaka High School
- Mie High School

== See also ==
- List of railway stations in Japan
