= Mikumo, Mie =

Dissolved municipality in Mie prefecture, Japan

Mikumo (三雲町, Mikumo-chō) was a town located in Ichishi District, Mie Prefecture, Japan.

As of 2003, the town had an estimated population of 11,480 and a density of 607.73 persons per km^{2}. The total area was 18.89 km^{2}.

On January 1, 2005, Mikumo, along the town of Ureshino (also from Ichishi District), and the towns of Iinan and Iitaka (both from Iinan District), was merged into the expanded city of Matsusaka and thus no longer exists as an independent municipality.
