= Iitaka, Mie =

Dissolved municipality in Mie prefecture, Japan

Iitaka (飯高町, Iitaka-chō) was a town located in Iinan District, Mie Prefecture, Japan.

As of 2003, the town had an estimated population of 5,270 and a density of 21.87 persons per km^{2}. The total area was 240.94 km^{2}.

On January 1, 2005, Matsu, along the towns of Mikumo and Ureshino (both from Ichishi District), and the town of Iinan (also from Iinan District), was merged into the expanded city of Matsusaka and thus no longer exists as an independent municipality.

Okukahada Gorge is a ravine along the upper reaches of the Kushida River, in Iitaka.
