= Ureshino, Mie =

Dissolved municipality in Mie prefecture, Japan

Ureshino (嬉野町, Ureshino-chō) was a town located in Ichishi District, Mie Prefecture, Japan.

As of 2003, the town had an estimated population of 18,597 and a density of 238.45 persons per km^{2}. The total area was 77.99 km^{2}.

On January 1, 2005, Ureshino, along the town of Mikumo (also from Ichishi District), and the towns of Iinan and Iitaka (both from Iinan District), was merged into the expanded city of Matsusaka and thus no longer exists as an independent municipality.
