= Matsusaka beef =

Type of beef from Japan

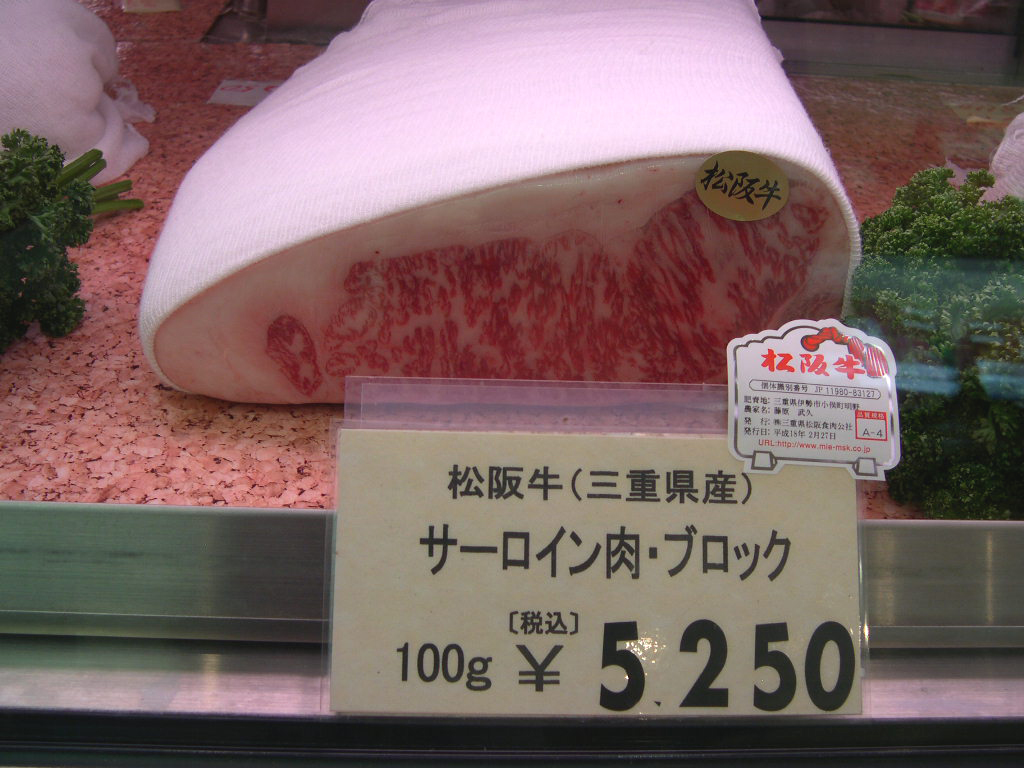
Matsusaka loin for sale in Tokyo

Matsusaka beef (松阪牛, Matsusaka-ushi, Matsusaka-gyū also "Matsuzaka beef") is the meat of Japanese Black cattle reared under strict conditions in the Matsusaka region of Mie in Japan. It has a high fat-to-meat ratio. Within Japan, Matsusaka is one of the three Sandai Wagyū, the "three big beefs", the others being Kobe beef and Ōmi beef or Yonezawa beef. About 2,500 cows are slaughtered for Matsusaka beef each year; the meat commands high prices.

== History ==
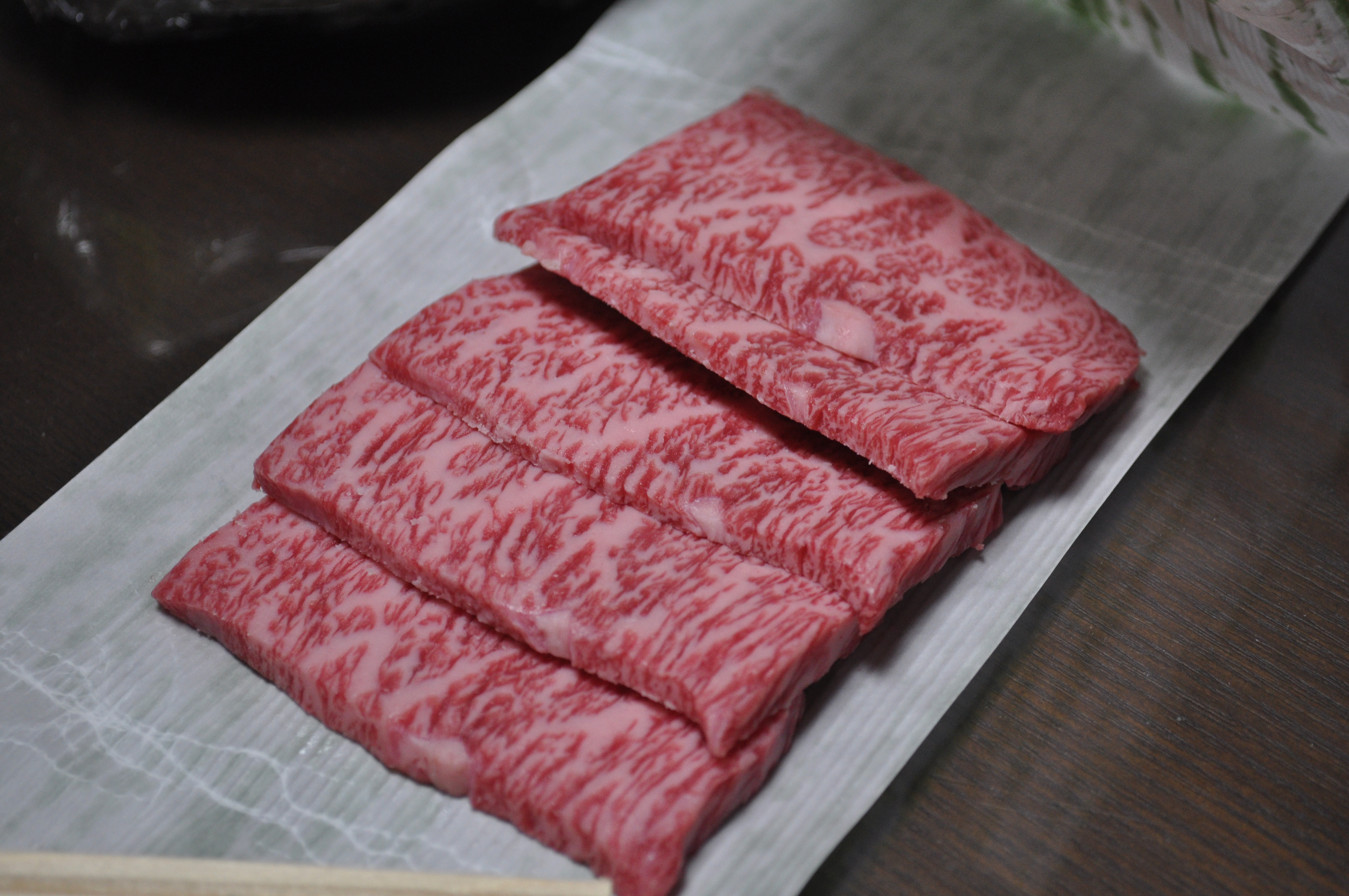
Matsusaka beef, showing heavy marbling

Before the 19th century, beef was not typically a part of the average Japanese diet. Farmers in the Mie Prefecture would raise smaller and more muscular, female cows to do agricultural work. When westerners introduced them to eating beef, farmers began to raise the cows to have traits that were more favorable for human consumption. The "National Beef Exposition" awarded Matsusaka with the medal of high honor in 1938. The award helped make Matsusaka more well known. The beef became famous for its marbling, rich flavor, and tenderness.

== Original standards ==
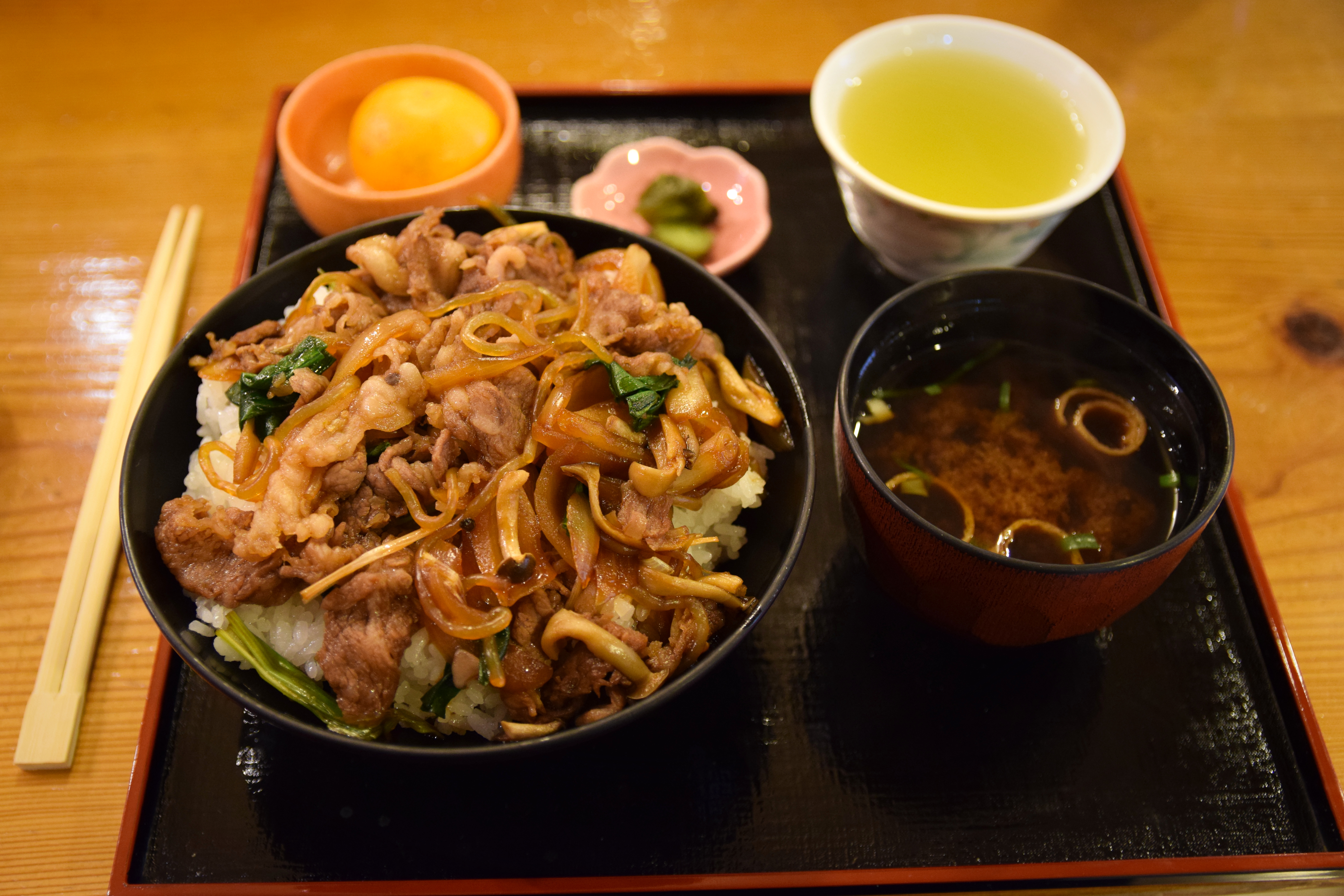
Matsusaka beef as a topping on gyūdon

The cows take roughly three years to mature. In order for the meat to be sold under the Matsusaka name, it must meet strict standards. Only heifers can be sold as Matsusaka beef and all calves must be of a breed registered by the Matsusaka Beef Management System. Most of the meat is sold through stores owned by the Matsusaka Beef Cattle Association. To prevent cheap meat from being sold under the Matsusaka name, all authentic stores have an "Association Member's Certificate". The Mie Prefecture Matsusaka Shokuniku Kosha public corporation implemented a system for tracking the cows to ensure authenticity. All cattle are given a 10-digit ID. The date of birth, location of birth, date it was slaughtered, shipping information, and the bloodline of each cow can be found by entering the ID on a website.

== Cooking ==
While Matsusaka beef can be eaten as a steak, there are more traditional methods of cooking the meat. Shabu-shabu is prepared with very thin slices of meat which are quickly dipped in a kelp broth and then eaten. Sukiyaki is a method that involves simmering thin slices of meat in a pot with a sauce of sugar, sake and soy sauce. After the meat has been cooked, it is removed from the pot, dipped in a raw egg and eaten. The melting in one's mouth sensation comes from the unsaturated fatty acids in the beef.

== Gallery ==
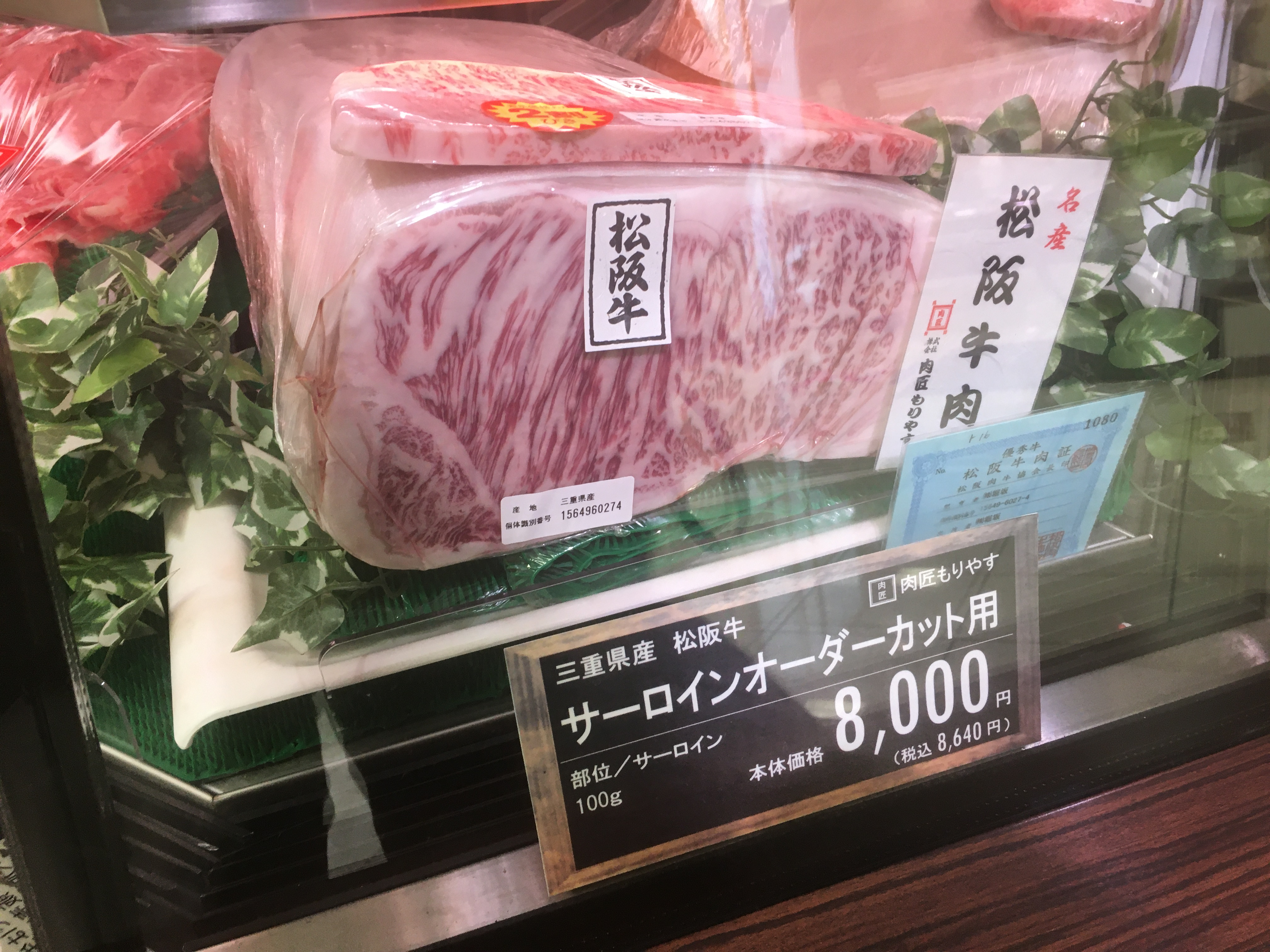
At a store

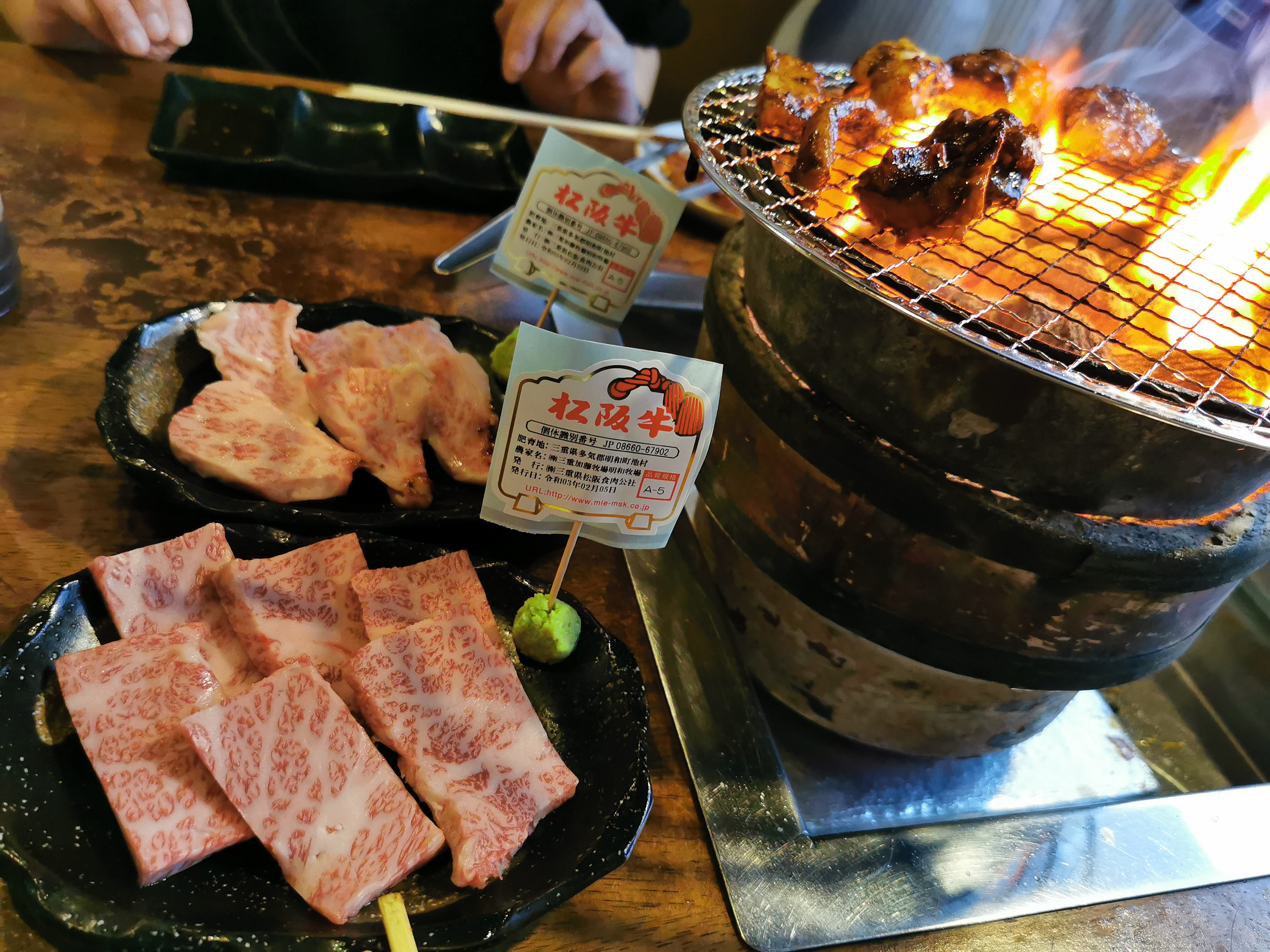
Barbeque on a shichirin grill

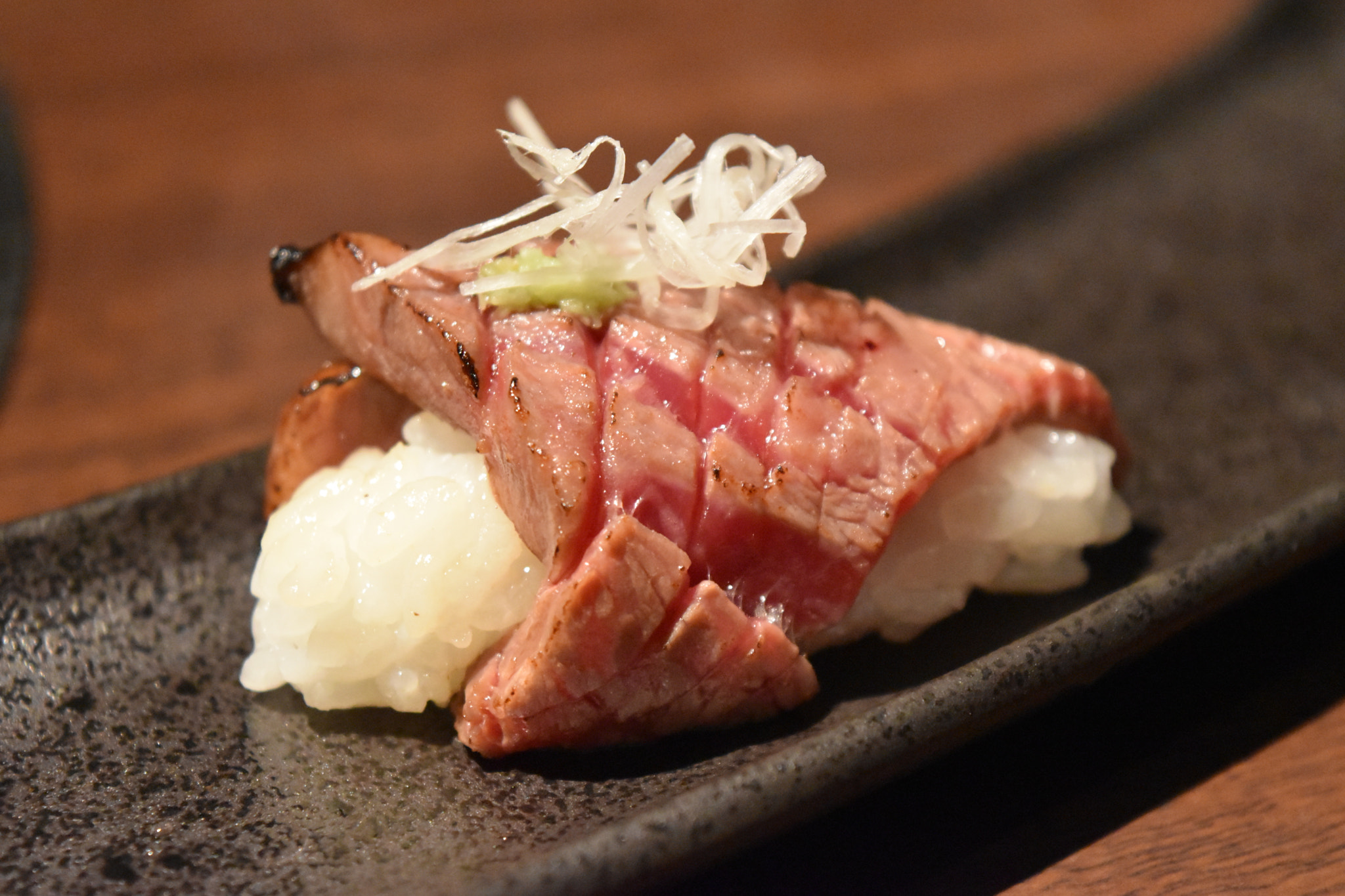
As sushi

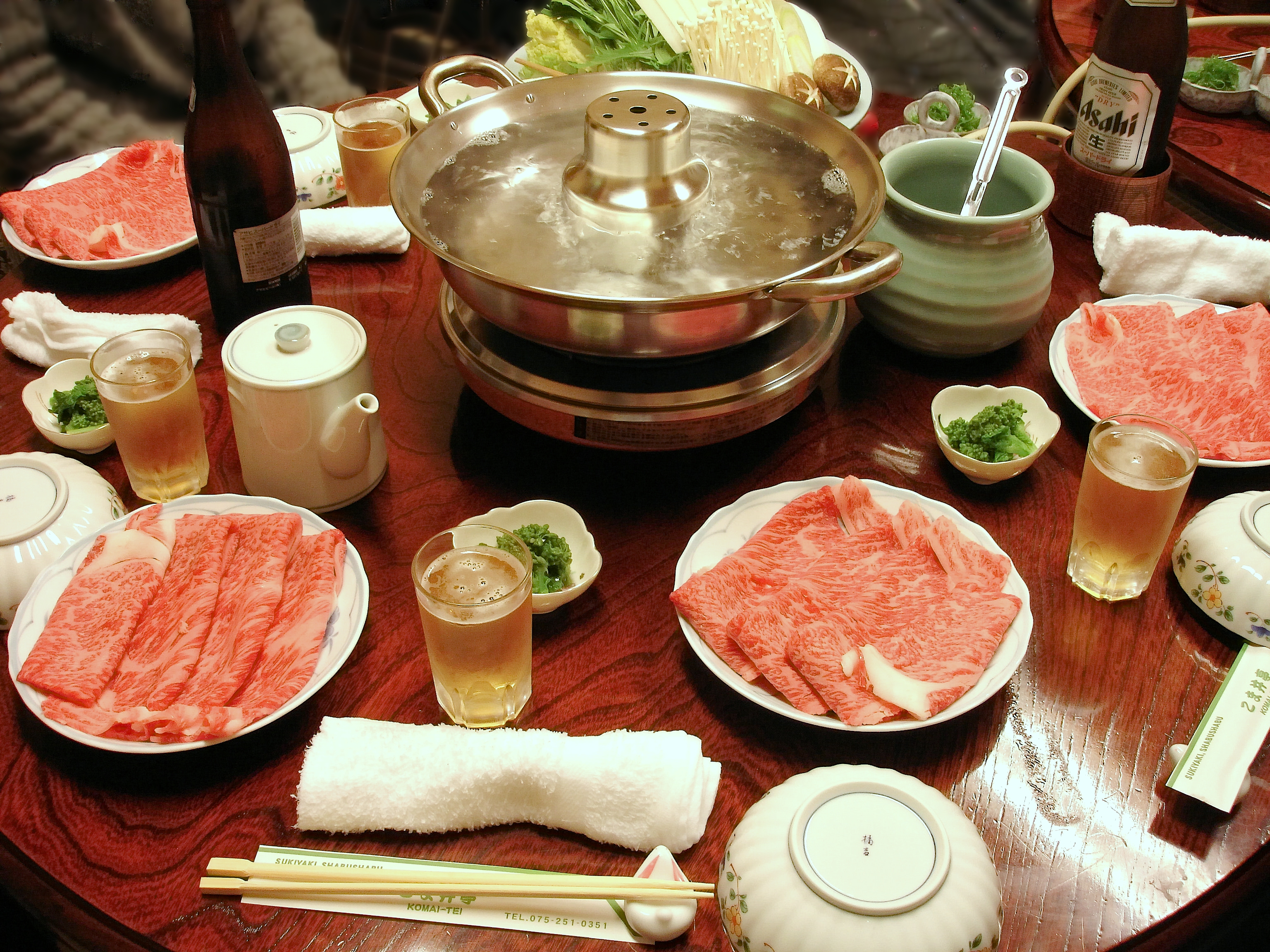
Prepared for shabu-shabu

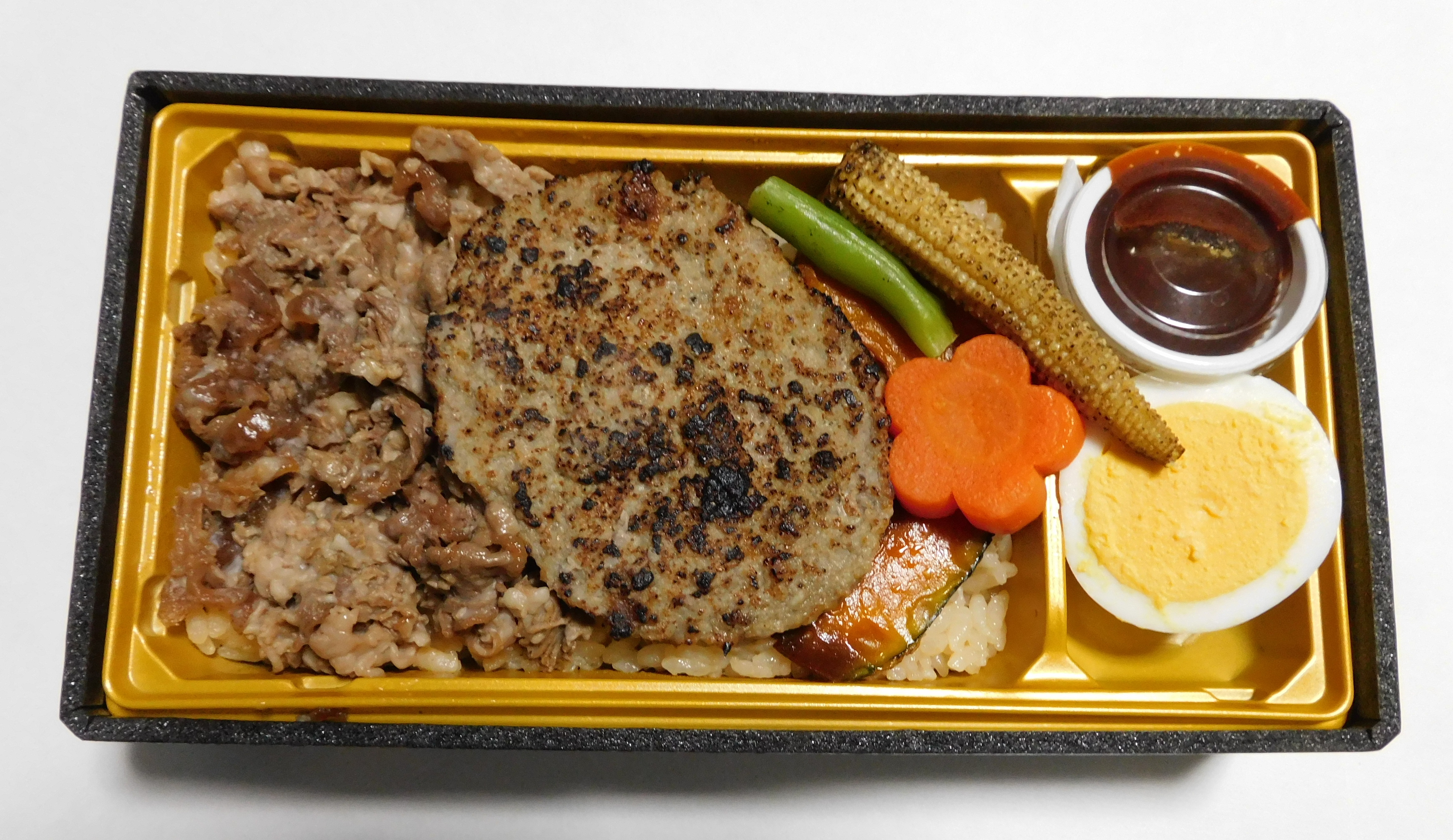
In a bento

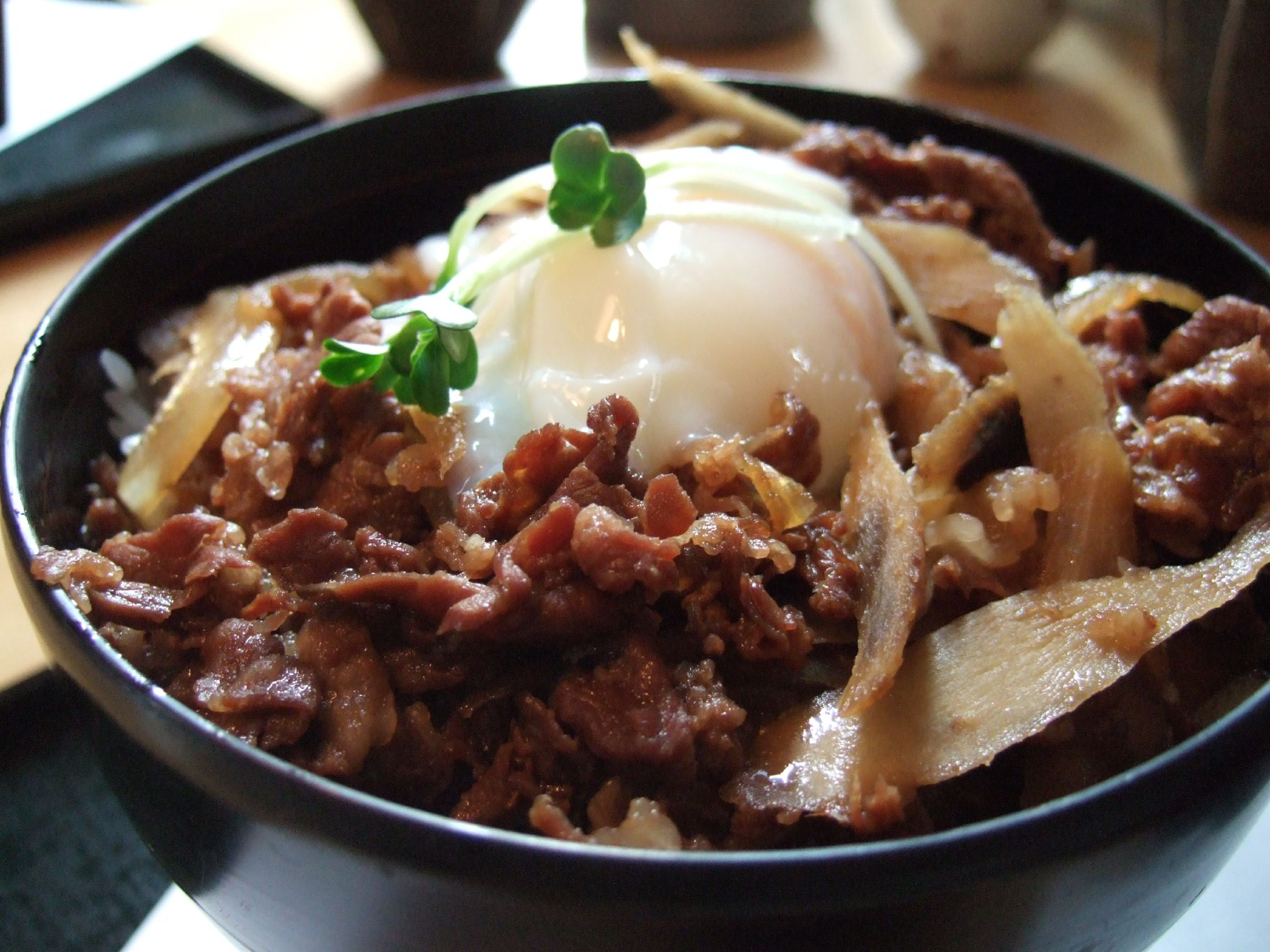
In gyūdon

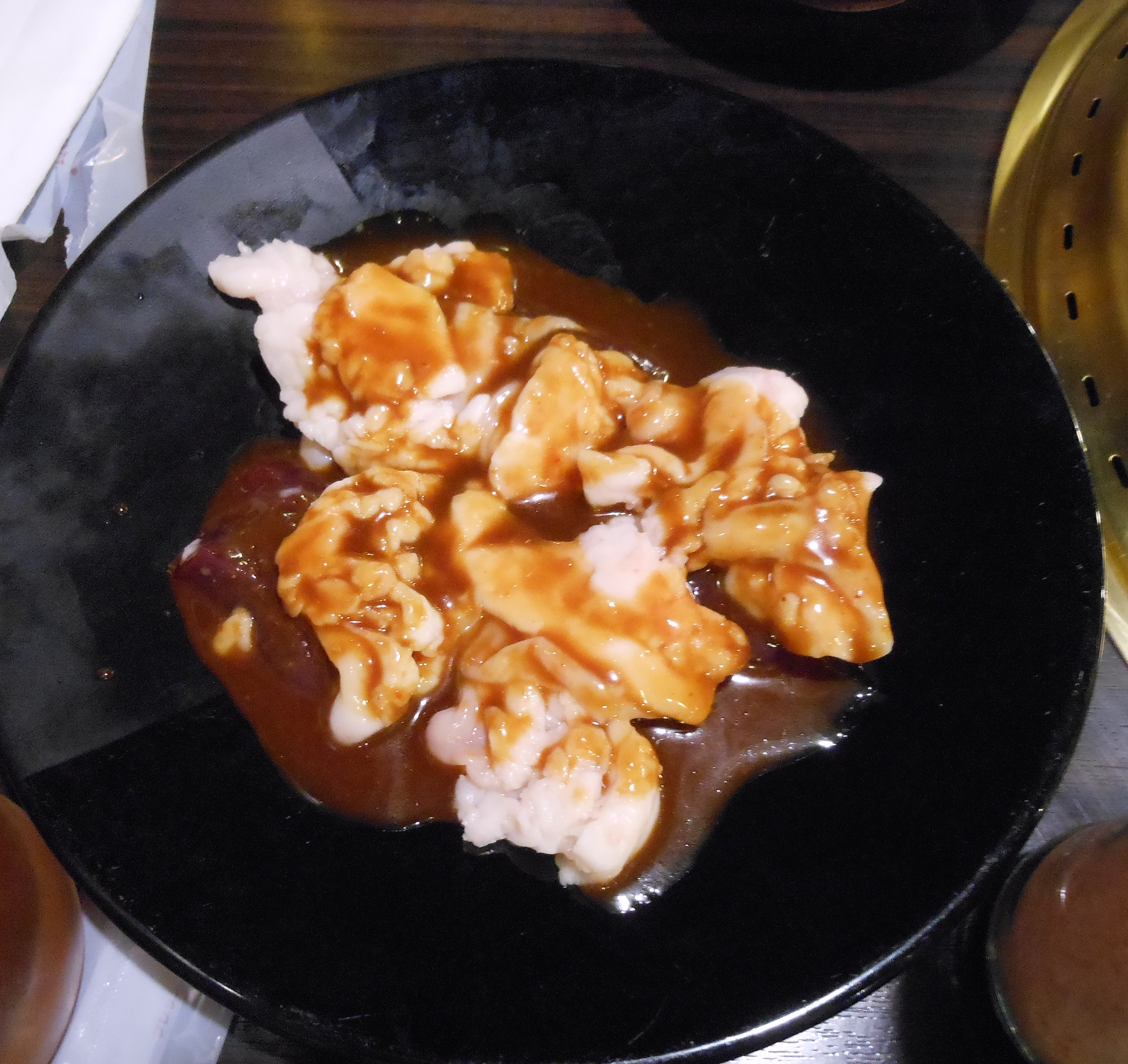
Matsusaka beef horumon
