= Iinan, Mie =

Dissolved municipality in Mie prefecture, Japan

Iinan (飯南町, Iinan-chō) was a town located in Iinan District, Mie Prefecture, Japan.

As of 2003, the town had an estimated population of 5,965 and a density of 78.15 persons per km^{2}. The total area was 76.33 km^{2}.

On January 1, 2005, Iinan, along the towns of Mikumo and Ureshino (both from Ichishi District), and the town of Iitaka (also from Iinan District), was merged into the expanded city of Matsusaka and thus no longer exists as an independent municipality.
