= Iinan District, Mie =

Former district in Mie prefecture, Japan

(Japan > Mie Prefecture > Iinan District)

Iinan (飯南郡, Iinan-gun) was a district located in Mie Prefecture, Japan.

As of 2003, the district had an estimated population of 11,235 and the total area was 317.27 km^{2}.

== Timeline ==
- March 29, 1896 - The district was formed when Iitaka and Iino Districts merged. (1 town, 23 villages)
- April 1, 1908 - The village of Kamiyama(?) broke off and merged into the villages of Izawa and Kushida (respectively). (1 town, 22 villages)
- January 1, 1921 - The village of Susudomari(?) was merged into the town of Matsusaka. (1 town, 21 villages)
- January 1, 1924 - The village of Kakino was elevated to town status to become the town of Kakino. (2 towns, 20 villages)
- April 1, 1931 - The village of Kobe(?) was merged into the town of Matsusaka. (2 towns, 19 villages)
- July 1, 1932 - The village of Hanaoka was elevated to town status to become the town of Hanaoka. (3 towns, 18 villages)
- 1933:
  - February 1 - The town of Matsusaka was elevated to city status to become the city of Matsusaka. (2 towns, 18 villages)
  - February 11 - The village of Kayumi was elevated to town status to become the town of Kayumi. (3 towns, 17 villages)
- December 25, 1948 - The villages of Matsue and Asami were merged into the city of Matsusaka. (3 towns, 15 villages)
- December 1, 1951 - The village of Isedera was merged into the city of Matsusaka. (3 towns, 14 villages)
- December 1, 1952 - The village of Hatadono merged into the city of Matsusaka. (3 towns, 13 villages)
- October 15, 1954 - The town of Hanaoka, and the villages of Minato, Matsuo and Nishikurobe were merged into the city of Matsusaka. (2 towns, 10 villages)
- April 1, 1955 - The villages of Chihiroe, Oishi, Izawa and Ishiro were merged into the city of Matsusaka. (2 towns, 6 villages)
- August 1, 1956: (2 towns, 2 villages)
  - The towns of Kakino and Kayumi were merged to become the town of Iinan.
  - The villages of Miyamae, Kabata, Mori and Haze were merged to become the town of Iitaka.
- October 1, 1957 - The villages of Okawachi and Kushida were merged into the city of Matsusaka. (2 towns)
- On January 1, 2005 - The towns of Iinan and Iitaka, along with the towns of Mikumo and Ureshino (both from Ichishi District), were merged into the expanded city of Matsusaka. Iinan District was dissolved as a result of this merger.

明治22年以前	旧郡	明治29年3月29日	明治29年 - 昭和19年	昭和20年 - 昭和64年	平成1年 - 現在	現在
	飯高郡	柿野村	大正13年1月1日 町制	昭和31年8月1日 飯南町	平成17年1月1日 松阪市	松阪市
	飯高郡	粥見村	昭和8年2月11日 町制	昭和31年8月1日 飯南町	平成17年1月1日 松阪市	松阪市
	飯高郡	宮前村	宮前村	昭和31年8月1日 飯高町	平成17年1月1日 松阪市	松阪市
	飯高郡	川俣村	川俣村	昭和31年8月1日 飯高町	平成17年1月1日 松阪市	松阪市
	飯高郡	森村	森村	昭和31年8月1日 飯高町	平成17年1月1日 松阪市	松阪市
	飯高郡	波瀬村	波瀬村	昭和31年8月1日 飯高町	平成17年1月1日 松阪市	松阪市
	飯高郡	松阪町	昭和8年2月1日 市制	松阪市	平成17年1月1日 松阪市	松阪市
	飯高郡	鈴止村	大正10年1月1日 松阪町に編入	松阪市	平成17年1月1日 松阪市	松阪市
	飯高郡	神戸村	昭和6年4月1日 松阪町に編入	松阪市	平成17年1月1日 松阪市	松阪市
	飯高郡	松江村	松江村	昭和23年12月25日 松阪市に編入	平成17年1月1日 松阪市	松阪市
	飯高郡	伊勢寺村	伊勢寺村	昭和26年12月1日 松阪市に編入	平成17年1月1日 松阪市	松阪市
	飯高郡	花岡村	昭和7年7月1日 町制	昭和29年10月15日 松阪市に編入	平成17年1月1日 松阪市	松阪市
	飯高郡	港村	港村	昭和29年10月15日 松阪市に編入	平成17年1月1日 松阪市	松阪市
	飯高郡	松尾村	松尾村	昭和29年10月15日 松阪市に編入	平成17年1月1日 松阪市	松阪市
	飯高郡	茅広江村	茅広江村	昭和30年4月1日 松阪市に編入	平成17年1月1日 松阪市	松阪市
	飯高郡	大石村	大石村	昭和30年4月1日 松阪市に編入	平成17年1月1日 松阪市	松阪市
	飯高郡	大河内村	大河内村	昭和32年10月1日 松阪市に編入	平成17年1月1日 松阪市	松阪市
	飯野郡	朝見村	朝見村	昭和23年12月25日 松阪市に編入	平成17年1月1日 松阪市	松阪市
	飯野郡	機殿村	機殿村	昭和27年12月1日 松阪市に編入	平成17年1月1日 松阪市	松阪市
	飯野郡	西黒部村	西黒部村	昭和29年10月15日 松阪市に編入	平成17年1月1日 松阪市	松阪市
	飯野郡	漕代村	漕代村	昭和30年4月1日 松阪市に編入	平成17年1月1日 松阪市	松阪市
	飯野郡	射和村	射和村	昭和30年4月1日 松阪市に編入	平成17年1月1日 松阪市	松阪市
	飯野郡	神山村	明治41年4月1日 射和村に編入	昭和30年4月1日 松阪市に編入	平成17年1月1日 松阪市	松阪市
	飯野郡	神山村	明治41年4月1日 櫛田村に編入	昭和32年10月1日 松阪市に編入	平成17年1月1日 松阪市	松阪市
	飯野郡	櫛田村	櫛田村	昭和32年10月1日 松阪市に編入	平成17年1月1日 松阪市	松阪市

== See also ==
- List of dissolved districts of Japan
