= Mie Chukyo University =

Private university in Matsusaka, Mie, Japan

Coordinates: 34°33′48.76″N 136°40′40.46″E

Mie Chukyo Daigaku
- 三重中京大学; Mie chūkyō daigaku
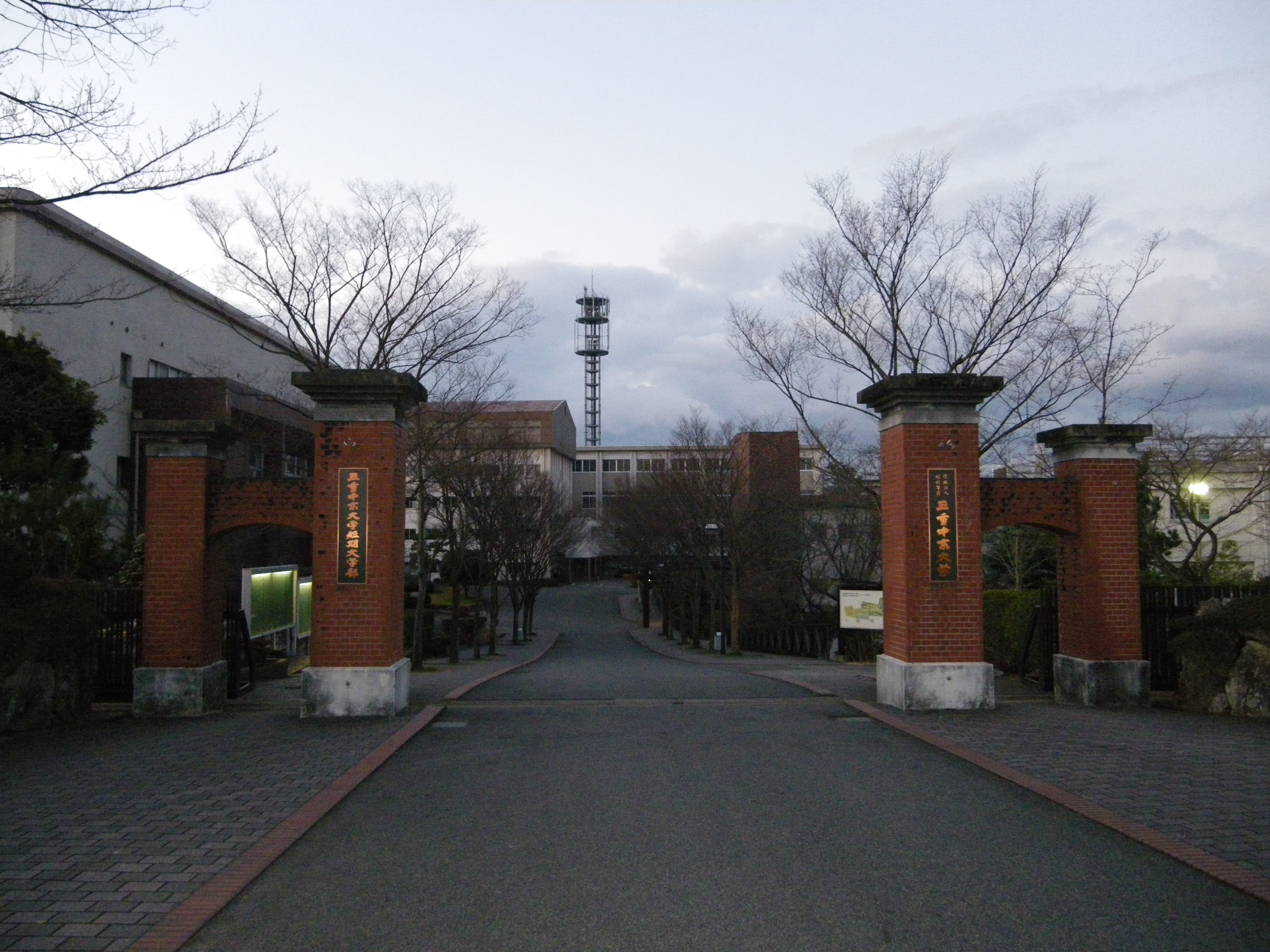
- Type: Private
- Active: 2003–2013
- Location: Matsusaka, Mie, Japan
- Website: www.mie-chukyo-u.ac.jp

Mie Chukyo University (三重中京大学, Mie Chūkyō Daigaku) was a private university in Matsusaka, Mie, Japan, established in 1982. Formerly known as Matsusaka University (松阪大学, Matsusaka Daigaku), the school adopted the final name in 2005. It ended operations in 2013.

== History ==
The Mie Chukyo University opened as Matsusaka University in 1982 as the first university in Mie Prefecture specialising in social sciences. The Departments of Political Economy, Political Science, and Economics were established. A Teacher Training Department was established in 1987, and a master's degree graduate program for the School of Political Science was established in 1997. This was expanded into a doctoral program in 1999. The school changed its name to Mie Chukyo University in 2005. The school closed its Teacher Training Department in 2007 and closed its Junior College in March 2011.

== Organization ==
- Four-year program
  - Faculty of Law and Contemporary Economics
    - Department of Modern Law and Economics
- Graduate program
  - Graduate School of Policy Science (MSc, PhD)
