= Japanese railway signals =

Japanese railway signals, according to the ministerial decree defining technical standards of railways (鉄道に関する技術上の基準を定める省令, Tetsudō ni kansuru gijutsu jō no kijun wo sadameru shōrei), are defined as indicating operational conditions for railway staff driving trains.

Japanese signalling was initially based on British railway signalling practice, and Japanese railway signalling continues to be based on the UK route signalling system for junctions. However, as signalling has advanced to meet the requirements of the system, progressive speed signalling is used outside of junctions.

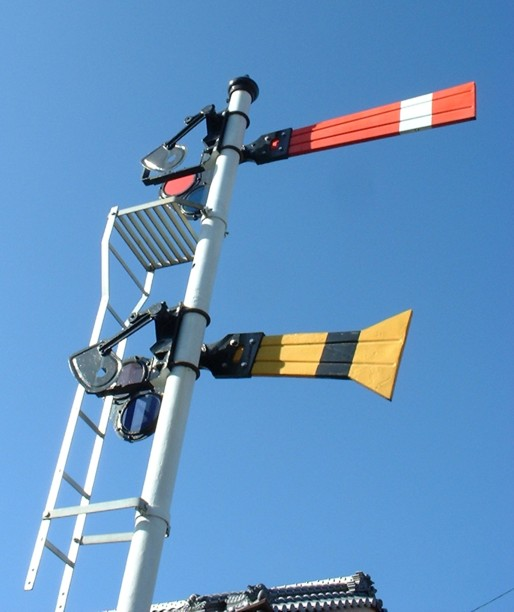
Semaphore signals

Rotation-type obstruction indicator

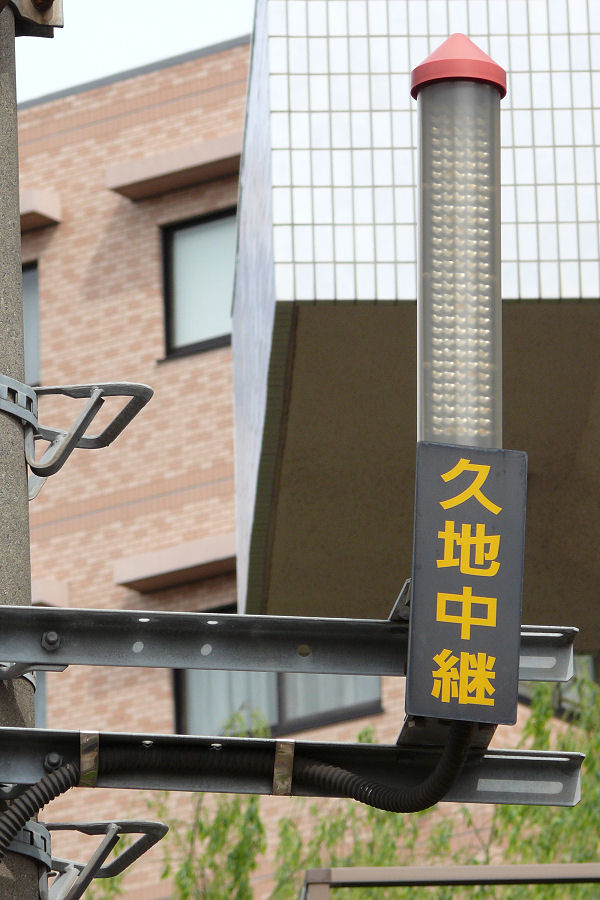
Flash-type obstruction indicator

== Fixed signals ==
=== Main signals ===
A main signal (主信号機 shu shingōki) protects a section of track (known as a block). A protected section is in advance of (内方 naihō) the main signal. The section behind the main signal is called 外方 (gaihō). However, under the non-automatic block system a starting signal has no protected section; it only indicates that all turnouts on the route to the mainline are switched correctly. Under the non-automatic block system trains cannot leave a station without an appropriate token, even if the starting signal is clear.

Home, starting and block signals on Japanese railways are usually lights composed of three colors (green, yellow and red). The composition of the lighted colors shows the speed limit of the protected section.

Aspect	Name	Description
● ● Double green	High-speed clear (高速進行 kōsoku shinkō)	The high-speed clear signal is used only on the Keisei Narita Airport Line, and indicates that Skyliner trains may travel over 130 kilometres per hour (81 mph) to a maximum speed of 160 kilometres per hour (99 mph). It was formerly used on the Hokuetsu Express Hokuhoku Line until Hakutaka services that ran over 130 kilometres per hour (81 mph) were discontinued following the opening of the Hokuriku Shinkansen.
● Green	Clear (進行 shinkō)	Trains may proceed at line speed. For the lines equipped with high speed signals, the speed limit is 130 km/h.
● ● Green/yellow flashing	Limited speed (抑速 yokusoku)	Used only between Shinagawa and Yokohama on the Keihin Electric Express Railway and on the Keisei Narita Airport Line. It indicates a speed limit of 105 kilometres per hour (65 mph).
● ● Green/yellow	Reduced speed (減速 gensoku)	Displayed when the next signal displays restricted speed (YY) (or caution (Y), in the case of a short block section or poor siting of the next signal). The speed limit is 50–75 kilometres per hour (31–47 mph) except for Kintetsu (95 kilometres per hour (59 mph)) and Meitetsu (85 kilometres per hour (53 mph)) lines.
● Yellow	Caution (注意 chūi)	Displayed when the next signal displays stop. The speed limit is usually 40–55 kilometres per hour (25–34 mph) (except Kintetsu and Meitetsu, where it is 65 kilometres per hour (40 mph).
● ● Double yellow	Restricted speed (警戒 keikai)	Displayed when the distance to the next signal is unusually short, another train is running in advance of the signal or the safety overlap at the next signal is shorter than normal. The speed limit is typically 25 kilometres per hour (16 mph).
● Red	Stop (停止 teishi)	Not to be passed. If it is a permissive signal i.e. block signal, non-blocking operation is allowed, where train can continue at a maximum speed of 15 kilometres per hour (9.3 mph) after certain determined procedure.

Example of a color light signal
Left - the order of changing signal aspect of five-aspect color light signal Right - an example of blinking signals

If a signal lamp has burnt out, the signal will display its most restrictive aspect. If no lights are showing a signal is to be treated as stop, and may not be passed until a substitute signal is in place. Since the lights are all black, this situation is referred to as a "crow" (カラス, karasu).

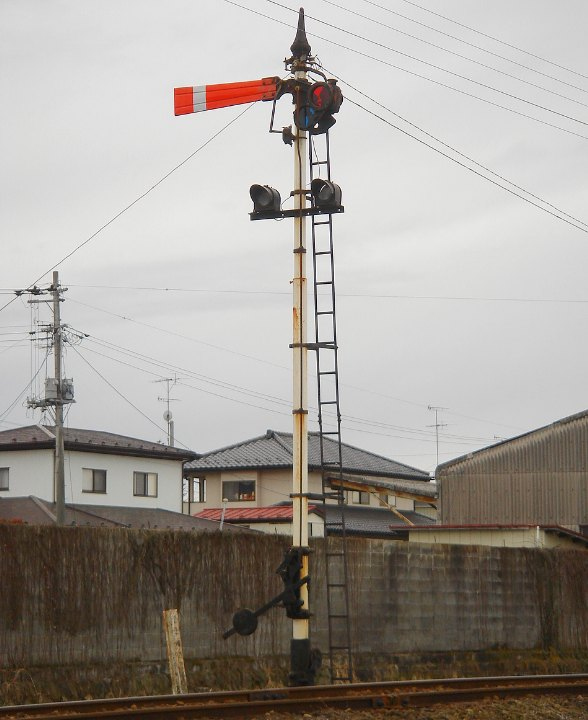
Semaphore signal on Kurihara Den'en Railway Line (discontinued in March 2007)

Many semaphore signals were formerly used, which were controlled by a hand lever. Few semaphores remain in Japan. On 28 July 2005, the last semaphore signals on the JR lines at Rikuchū-Yagi Station were replaced by colored lights. A few stations are still equipped with semaphore signals on the Tsugaru Railway Line, the Fukushima Rinkai Railway Main Line and the Niigata-Higashi industrial line.

==== Home signal ====
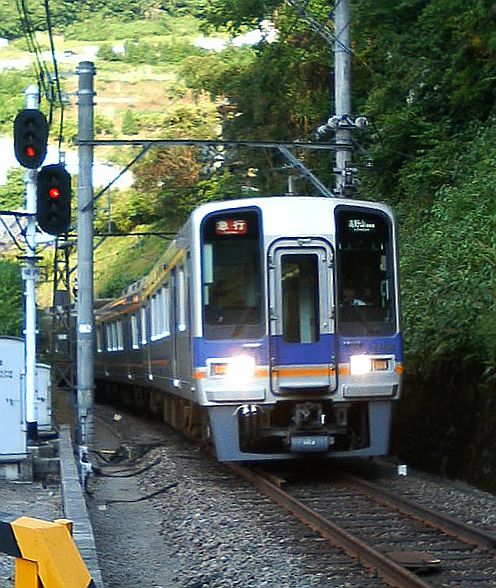
Home signals and Nankai Electric Railway Series 2000 EMUs

A home signal (場内信号機, jōnai shingōki) permits trains to enter the station. A home signal is absolute (絶対信号機, zettai shingōki); therefore, non-blocking operation is always prohibited. Some stations have multiple home signals, due to station layout. In these cases, each home signal has an identification number which is counted from the outside of the station. In high-traffic areas, some operators install home signals in the center of a platform track to divide the block section. Some operators treat such signals as block signals. In non-interlocking stations, there may be a No.0 block signal (in some operations, a No.1 block signal or home-signal equivalent block signal) which alternates with the home signal.

==== Starting signal ====
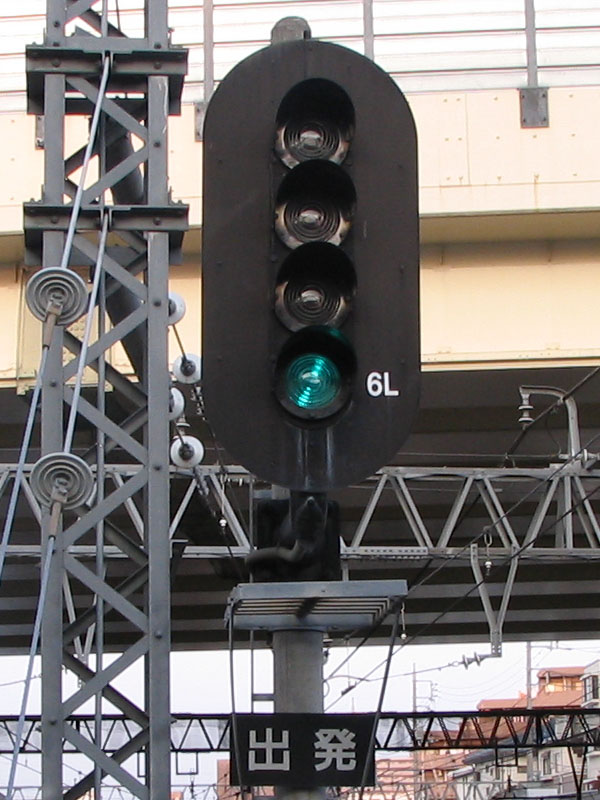
Starting signal at the Odakyu Electric Railway Sagami-Ōno Station

A starting signal (出発信号機, shuppatsu shingōki) permits trains to depart the station, and is an absolute signal. In some stations, there are multiple starting signals due to station layout. In such cases, each starting signal has an ID number which is counted from the inside of the station. In non-interlocking stations, there may be a block signal instead of a starting signal.

==== Block signal ====
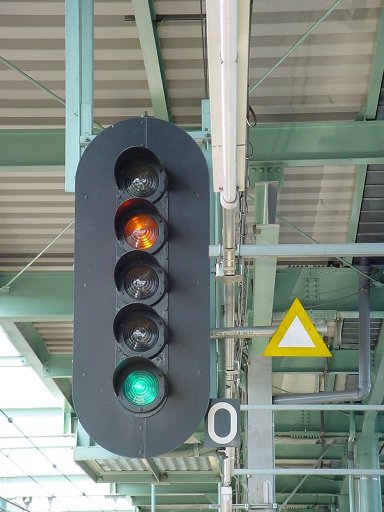
No.0 block signal at Odakyu Electric Railway Shimo-Kitazawa Station, displaying reduced speed

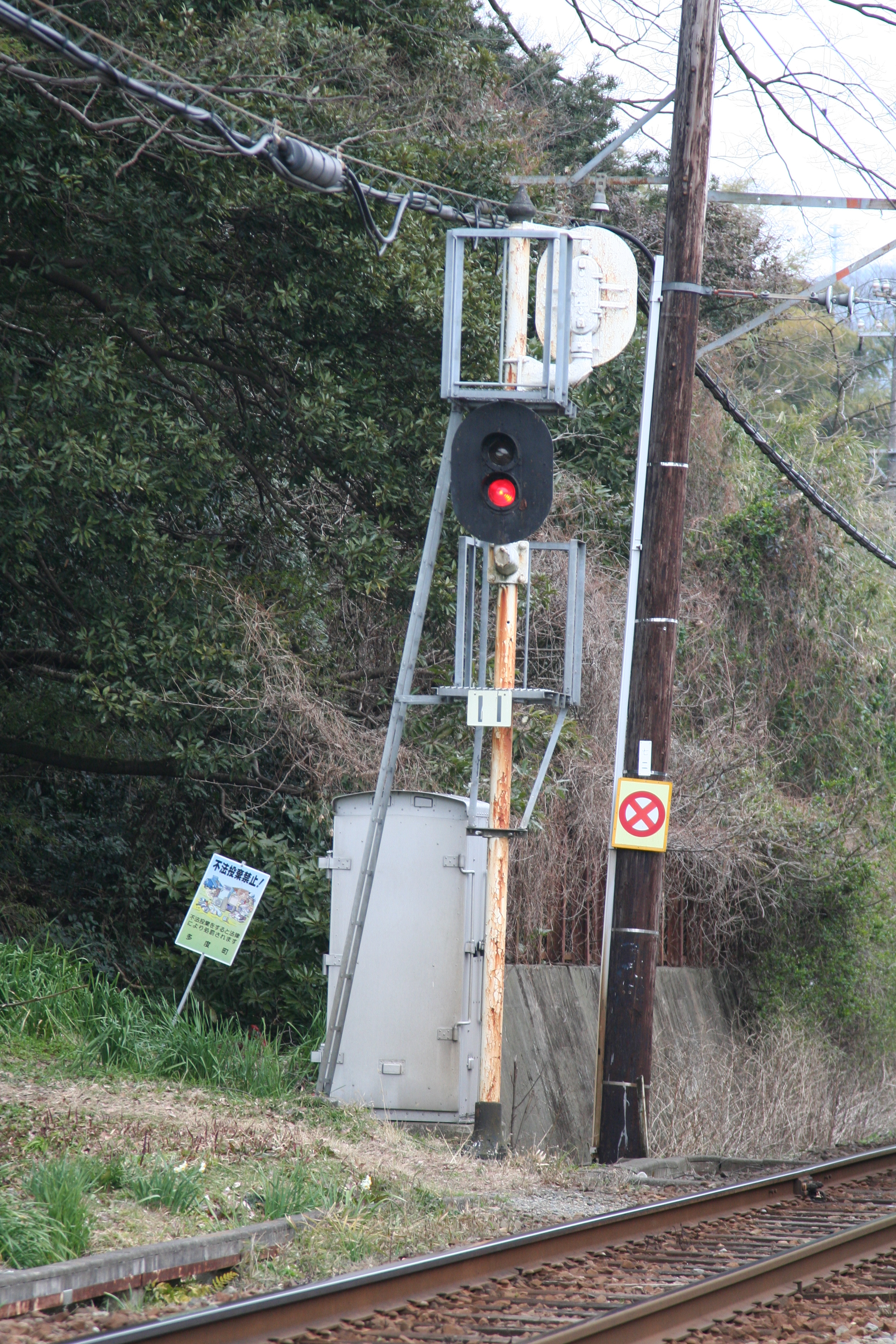
Two-light block signal (Y/R); signal post is shared by signals in both directions.

A block signal (閉塞信号機, heisoku shingōki) begins a block section in an automatic-block system. In non-blocking operation a train can proceed past a block signal after stopping for one minute at the signal, even if the signal is "stop".

Each block signal is identified by an identification number; as a train travels to the next station, the ID numbers count down. The last block signal before the home signal is number one. Each signal is associated with the next one; therefore, it cannot be manipulated by dispatchers or signalmen. The signal display depends on the presence of a train in advance of the signal and the display of the next signal.

A block signal is a permissive signal, so non-blocking operation is allowed. On some lines, a train can continue at a maximum speed of 15 kilometres per hour (9.3 mph) after stopping for one minute before a block signal displaying stop. The train must not increase speed over 15 km/h until it arrives just before the next main signal, regardless with signals in halfway. However, due to accidents during non-blocking operation, many operators abandoned it in favor of non-block operation with full attention (閉塞指示運転, heisoku shiji unten). In this system, a train driver must wait until a dispatcher instructs them by radio to proceed.

At crowded stations on high-traffic lines, a platform track may be divided into two block sections so a following train can enter the track soon after the preceding train has departed. This signal is known as a No. 0 block signal. JR East treats this signal as a part of its home signals. At non-interlocking stations of JR West and other operators, the last block signal before the station is treated as a No. 0 block signal and known as the home signal equivalent block signal. This signal is not absolute, since (unlike home signals) non-blocking operation is permitted. On ATOS (Automated Transport Operating System) lines block signals are numbered serially, regardless of non-interlocking stations. In this case, some block signals are defined as home-signal equivalent or starting-signal equivalent.

==== Illustration ====
The illustration shows typical home, starting and block signals. There are two color arrangements in a four-light signal. In this figure these two arrangements are informally marked as A and B for convenience. In addition, there are single- and six-light signals.

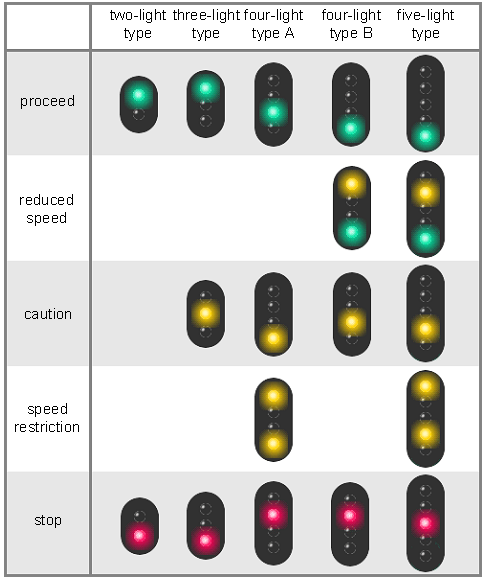

- In an aspect using two lights (such as YG and YY), two dark lights should be inserted between the lights to improve visibility.
- Some four-light signals (equipped with light-emitting diodes, LEDs) can act as a five-light signal.
- A two-light signal is primarily used as a starting signal on a single-track line.
- A two-light signal may consist of yellow and red lights. This is used as the home signal of a terminal station or a siding, since there is no need for a "proceed" signal. On lines where the maximum speed is about the same as the caution signal, it may be used as a block signal.

==== High-speed signal ====
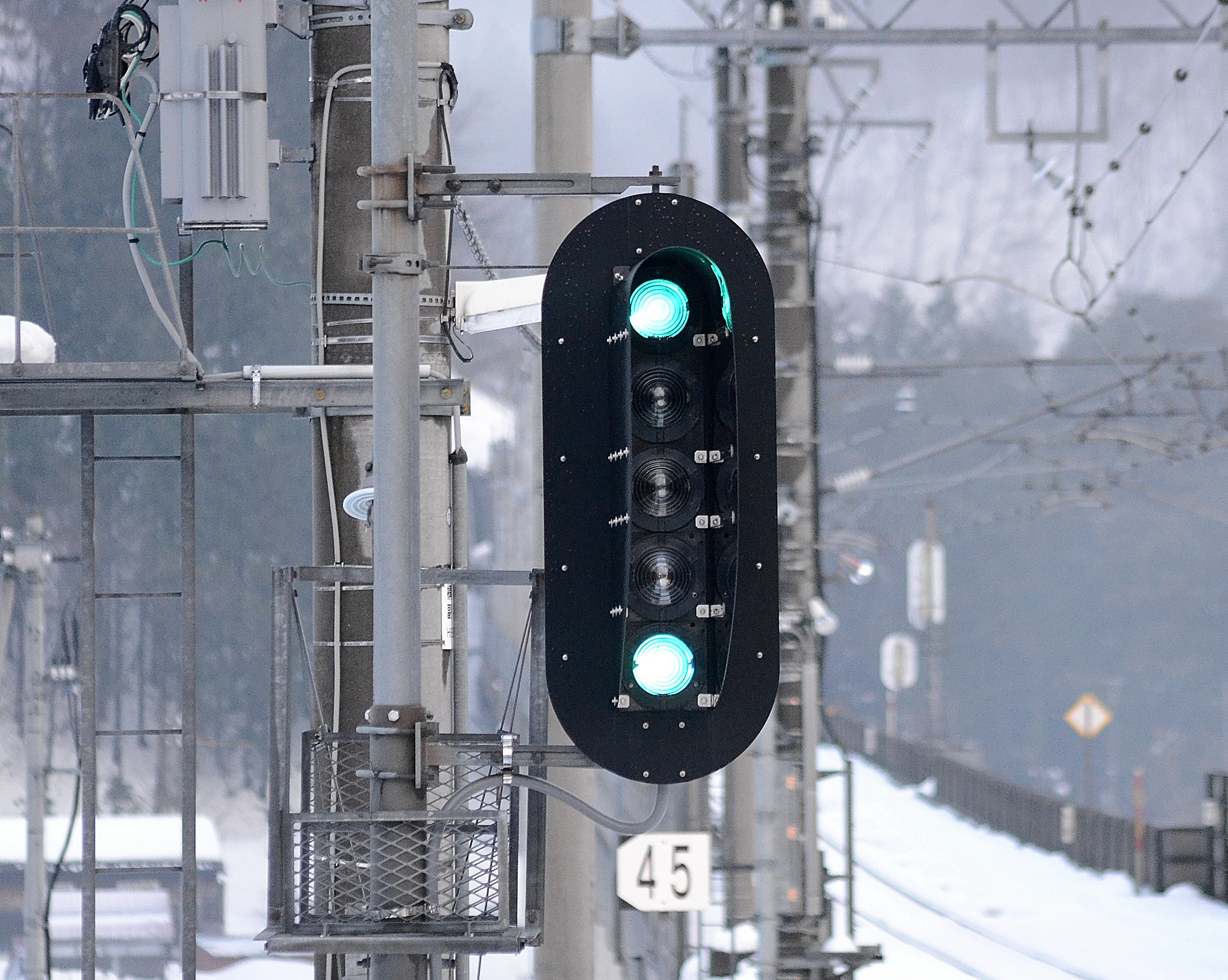
High-speed signal (five-light type)

There are six- and five-light high-speed signals (高速信号機,, kōsoku shingōki) with two green lights. In a six-light signal, the additional green light is located above the yellow light; in a five-light signal, the additional green light replaces the top yellow light (eliminating the speed-restriction signal). Two green lights indicate high-speed (no speed limit), and one green light (proceed signal) indicates a 130 kilometres per hour (81 mph) speed limit.

The high-speed signal was introduced on the Hokuetsu Express Hokuhoku Line in 1997, where Hakutaka limited express services ran until 2015 at a top speed of 160 kilometres per hour (99 mph). In 2010, high-speed signals were introduced for 160 km/h Skyliner services on the Keisei Narita Airport Line.

==== Call-on signal ====
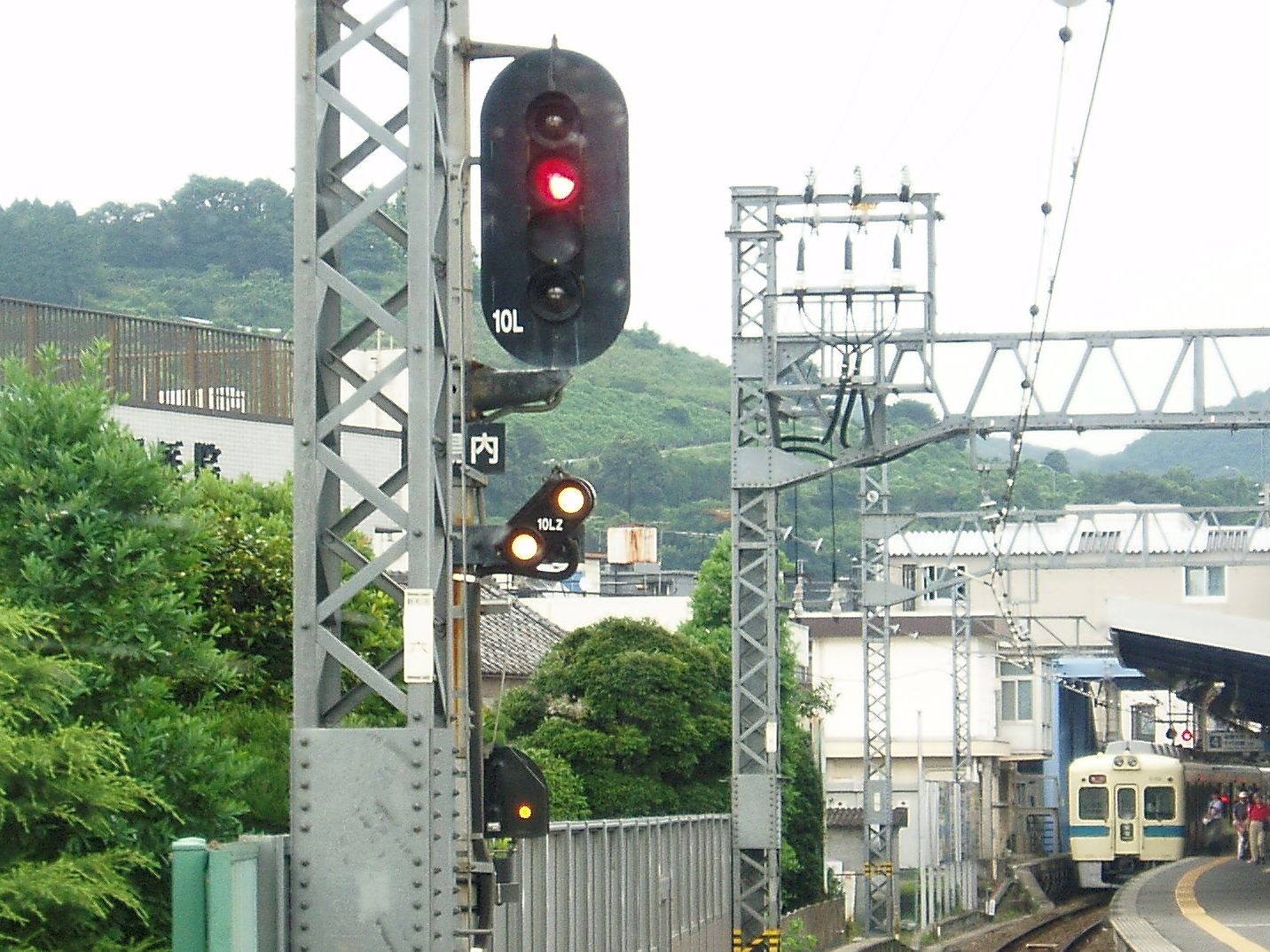
Two diagonal white lights under a red light

Normally, only one train can enter a block section for safety; however, with this rule a train cannot be coupled with another train. A call-on signal (誘導信号機, yūdō shingōki) permits a train to enter a section already occupied by another train to enable coupling.

A call-on signal is installed under a home or shunting signal. The train guided by a call-on signal can proceed under 15 kilometres per hour (9.3 mph)—25 kilometres per hour (16 mph) on some lines—until it reached the forward train. In stations where two trains use the same track simultaneously—for example, the Yosan Line Matsuyama Station (Ehime) and the Nankai Kōya Line Hashimoto Station (Wakayama)—call-on signals are required to allow two trains on a single block section. However, this is unnecessary if the platform track is divided into two block sections (for example, the Keihan Main Line Yodoyabashi Station of the Keihan Electric Railway).

There are two types of call-on signal (position and color). Both lights are normally off, and only lit if required. Position lights use two diagonal white lights; color lights are yellow.

==== Shunting signal ====
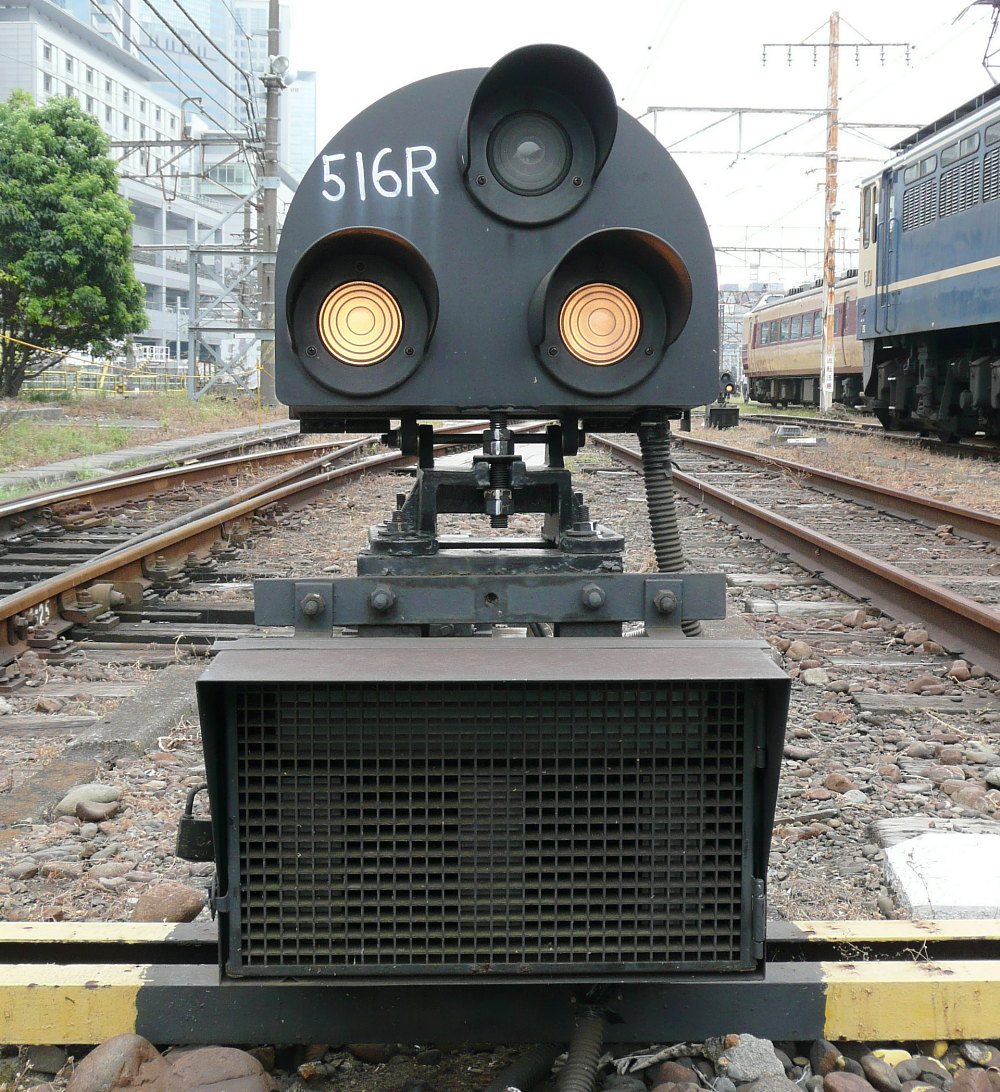
Position-type shunting signal

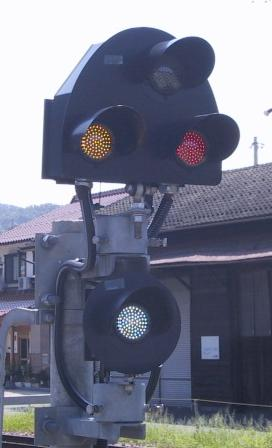
Two-color shunting signal

A shunting signal (入換信号機, irekae shingōki) is for car shunting in sidings and car depots; it is not used for trains in operation. A shunting signal has a protected section, and a train can proceed past the signal under 45 kilometres per hour (28 mph) (25 kilometres per hour (16 mph) if the train passes a non-interlocked turnout).

There are two types of shunting signal: position (灯列式, tōretsushiki) and color (色灯式, shikitōshiki). The position of two lighted bulbs indicates the position-type signal. This type is used primarily on JR and third-sector railways. In the color type, green means go and red stop. Color-type shunting signals are used primarily on private railways and subways; a narrow vertical signal is often used, due to narrow tunnels.

In position-shunting signals, "go" consists of two white diagonal lights and "stop" consists of red and white horizontal lights. The two-color type uses LEDs. When the shunting signal identification sign (入換信号機識別標識, irekae shingōki shikibetsu hyōshiki) is on, the indicator is a shunting signal; when the sign is off, the indicator is a shunting sign. The shunting-signal identification sign is installed below the position light.

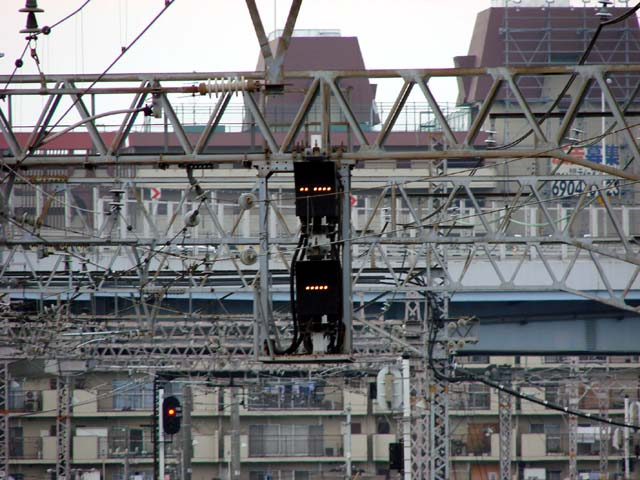
Shunting sign

A shunting sign (入換標識, irekae hyōshiki or—more briefly—入標, irehyō) is not a signal; therefore, its diagonal indicator is not "go" but "open" (開通, kaitsū). A shunting sign does not have a protected section. A shunting signal is absolute, but a shunting sign is a permissive. A train may pass a shunting sign reading "stop" only if the train is accompanied by a shunting staff; its locomotive displays a shunting car sign (入換動力車標識, irekae douryokusha hyōshiki)—a single red light at both ends—at night. In some systems, shunting-signal identification signs are omitted; instead, a shunting sign uses purple (instead of white) lights in a shunting signal.

A train is allowed to travel under 25 kilometres per hour (16 mph)—a lone locomotive may travel under 45 kilometres per hour (28 mph) if it does not pass non-interlocked turnouts—under a shunting sign. A stop sign may be installed just before a shunting signal (or sign) for safety.

=== Subsidiary signals ===
A subsidiary signal (従属信号機, jūzoku shingōki) is an alerting signal for a main signal. A subsidiary signal does not have its own protected section. When a train driver sees a stop signal and applies the brakes, the train may overrun the signal due to a long braking distance. A subsidiary signal gives advance notice, prompting the driver to decelerate to the speed allowed by the signal.

==== Distant signals ====
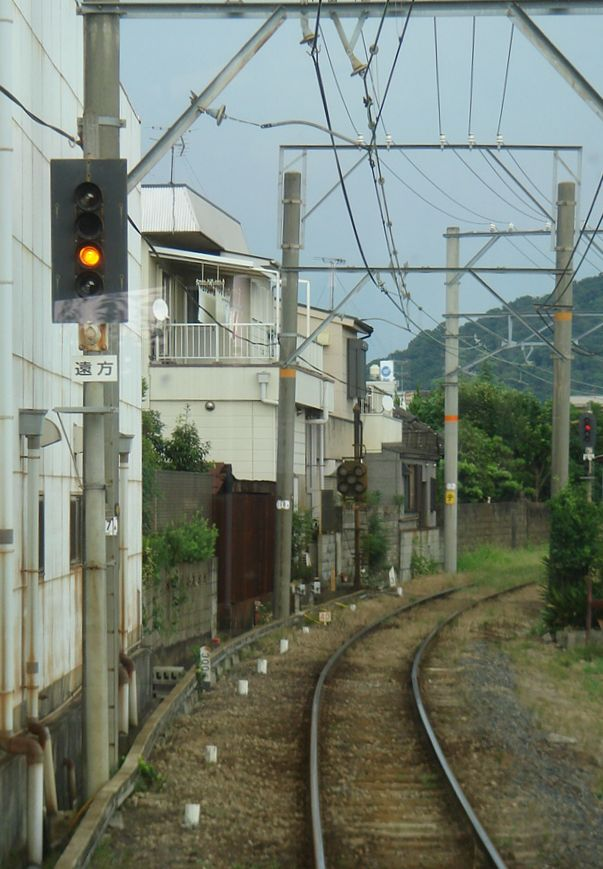
Distant signal (reading caution)

A distant signal (遠方信号機, enpō shingōki) is installed before a home signal with limited visibility and is linked to the home signal. Distant signals are primarily installed in non-automatic block sections on single-track lines. They may have two (caution and clear) or three (caution, reduced-speed and clear) displays. With multiple home signals, the distant signal applies to all.

The following lists home signal aspects and the corresponding distant signal aspects

Home signal	Distant signal
Stop	Caution
Reduced speed (or caution)	Reduced speed (or clear)
Reduced speed (or clear)	Clear

==== Passing signals ====
A passing signal (通過信号機, tsūka shingōki) is installed before a starting signal in cases of poor visibility. Its display is linked to that of the starting signal.

The relationship of a starting signal and its dependent passing signal correspond as follows (also affected by a home signal):

- Home signal stop: Passing signal caution (regardless of starting signal)
- Home signal go (starting signal stop): Passing signal caution
- Home signal go: Passing signal go

A passing signal has no red light. With multiple starting signals, there are also multiple passing signals with a one-to-one relationship.

==== Repeating signals ====
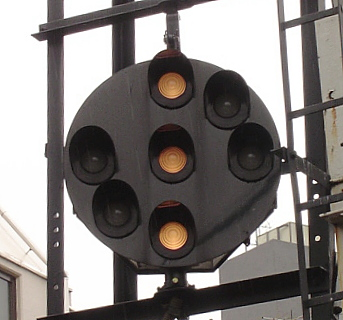
Repeating signal (proceed)

A repeating signal (中継信号機, chūkei shingōki) is linked to a home, starting or block signal with reduced visibility; the repeating signal repeats its relevant signal. This signal uses lines of three white lights to indicate its relevant signal:

- Proceed: Vertical line
- Caution: Diagonal line (reduced speed, caution or speed restriction)
- Stop: Horizontal line

This signal only repeats the relevant signal; speed restriction is applied at the relevant signal (not the repeating signal).

On the Hokuetsu Express Hokuhoku line (with high-speed signals), two repeating signals are used vertically; both signals display vertical lines for high speed. For other signals, only the lower repeating signal is used.

For underground lines where a round repeating signal would be difficult to install, a colored-light signal with a purple light (which is always on) may be used. This signal matches the relevant one.

=== Indicators ===
A signal appendix (信号付属機, shingō fuzokuki) is attached to a home, starting or shunting signal, complementing its condition.

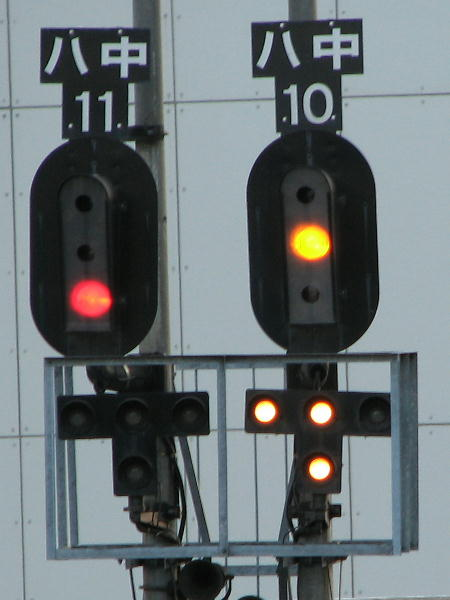
Route indicator (two routes, position type)

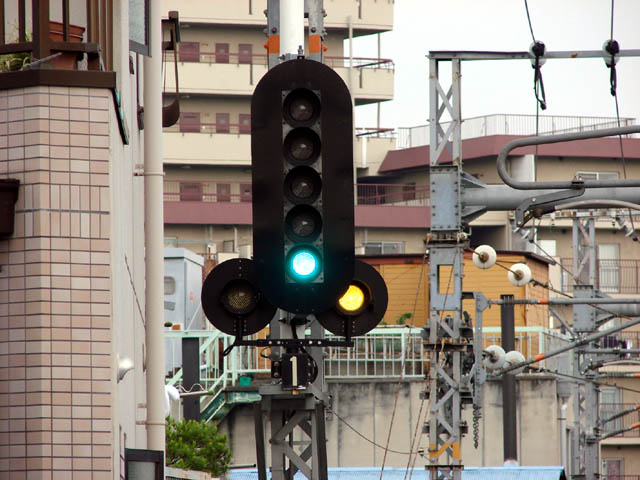
Preliminary route indicator; right side is clear.

==== Route indicator ====
In principle, an independent home or starting signal must be installed for each route. If this proves difficult, one signal can be used for multiple routes. In this case, a route indicator (進路表示機, shinro hyōjiki) displays the route a train is permitted to follow.

A position-type route indicator displays the route by light position. The relative position of the lighted bulbs indicates the route (with a maximum of three); if the left light is on, the train will take the left route. Some route indicators display the track number of the route or an arrow.

==== Rail indicator ====
A position-type rail indicator (線路表示器, senro hyōjiki) is attached to a shunting sign.

==== Preliminary route indicator ====
If there are multiple routes ahead and corresponding home (or starting) signals have poor visibility, a preliminary route indicator (進路予告機, shinro yokokuki) is installed below the signal one block before the home (or starting) signals. A preliminary route indicator advises the route displayed by the relevant home (or starting) signals.

Light status	Branch side		
Light status	Three-way branch (both left and right to the main line)	Two-way branch (left to the main line)	Two-way branch (right to the main line)
Left and right on	Main line clear	Main line clear	Main line clear
Left on	Left route clear	Left route clear	No
Right on	Right route clear	No	Right route clear

Some private railway companies use arrow signs, or Kanji or Katakana character signs from the first letter of the branch-line name.

A track-number type preliminary route indicator (進路予告機番線表示灯, shinro yokokuki bansen hyōjitō) advises the route by number. If a train is allowed on track #3, the track number display shows 3; the number's color matches the main signal to which the preliminary route indicator is attached.

==== Train-type sign ====
A train-type sign (列車種別表示灯, ressha shubetsu hyōjitō), transmitted from an onboard device, is attached to a starting signal and shows the type of train that can pass it. It is mainly used by large private railway companies in stations with passing loops, express stops or turn-back stations. The sign type depends on the operator; character and number signs and symbols are used.

==== Disused signals ====
When a fixed signal is out of use, the lamps are extinguished and:

- A white cross placed over the signal, indicating it is to be ignored
- A plate or cover is placed over the signal, obstructing it from view
- The signal is turned aside, so it does not face trains

== Cab signalling ==
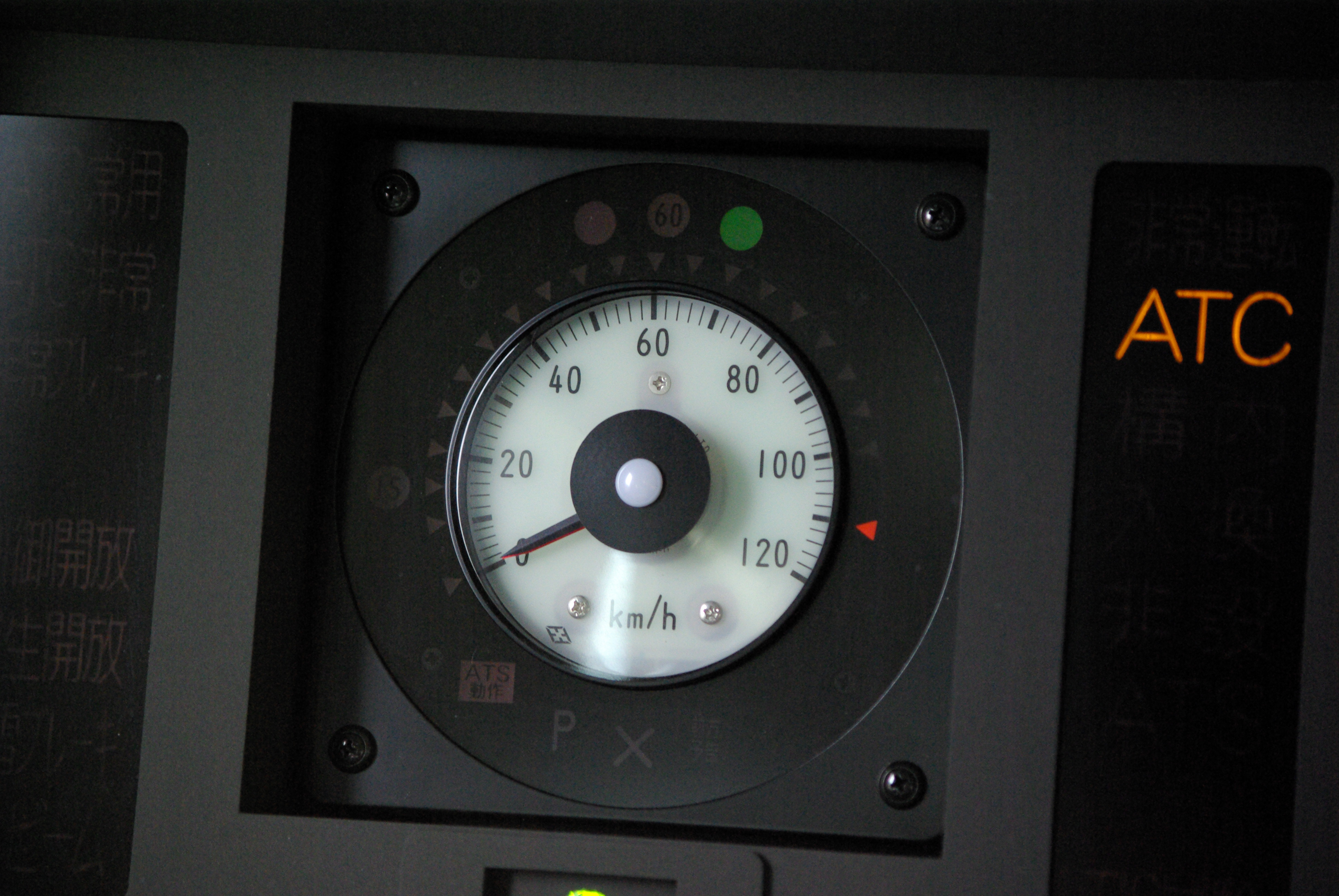
Cab signal

A cab signal (車内信号, shanai shingō) is a device displaying a signal in a train cab. Cab signalling can only work on tracks with Automatic Train Control or similar. The Yamanote Line, Keihin-Tōhoku Line, Keio Corporation, Shinkansen and some rapid transit lines use cab signalling. For example, on the Yamanote line there are arrow lamps that point to the corresponding speed on the speedometer; the lamp corresponding to the current maximum speed is lit. On the Shinkansen, cab signals were introduced because it is difficult to see track-side signals at high speed.

== Speed Indication Signals ==
Speed Indication Signals, or Speed Signs, are wayside signs that are usually white with black text that indicate the current maximum speed. If a speed sign indicates a different speed than a current fixed signal, then the lower speed should be adhered to. For example, if a train is inside a block of track whose signal indicates caution (40–55 km/h) and there is a speed sign which indicates a higher speed, the lower speed that the signal requires should be adhered to. Likewise, if a train is in a block whose signal indicates clear, and a speed sign indicates a lower speed, the lower speed of the sign should be adhered to.

If there is no speed restriction in a certain area, an unlimited speed sign is used. This are usually two black triangles, one pointing up and one pointing down; and two white triangles, one pointing left and one pointing right.

== Temporary signals ==
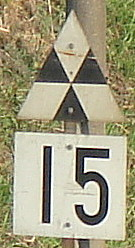
Temporary speed restriction warning

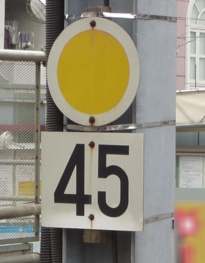
Temporary speed restriction

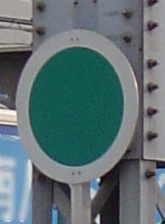
Temporary speed restriction termination

Temporary signals (臨時信号機, rinji shingōki) are installed in work areas to indicate temporary speed restrictions. Whilst these resemble signs, they are technically classed as signals.

=== Speed restriction warning ===
A speed restriction warning indicator (徐行予告信号機, jokō yokoku shingōki) advises a temporary speed restriction. The signal is a combination of white and black triangles, and the speed limit is shown below the signal. Some operators use fluorescent orange instead of white. The signal is often called a "Mitsubishi", because the white part of the signal resembles the triple-diamond logo of the Mitsubishi group.

=== Speed restriction ===
A speed-restriction indicator (徐行信号機, jokō shingōki) is installed at the beginning of the section to which the speed restriction applies. The signal is a yellow circle, and the speed limit is shown below the signal.

=== Speed restriction termination ===
A speed-limit termination indicator (徐行解除信号機, jokō kaijo shingōki) is a green circle placed at the end of the speed restriction. A train must observe the restricted speed until its end has passed the signal. To aid train drivers, some railway operators install a sign further on to indicate when the rear of the train has cleared the restriction.

== Hand signals ==
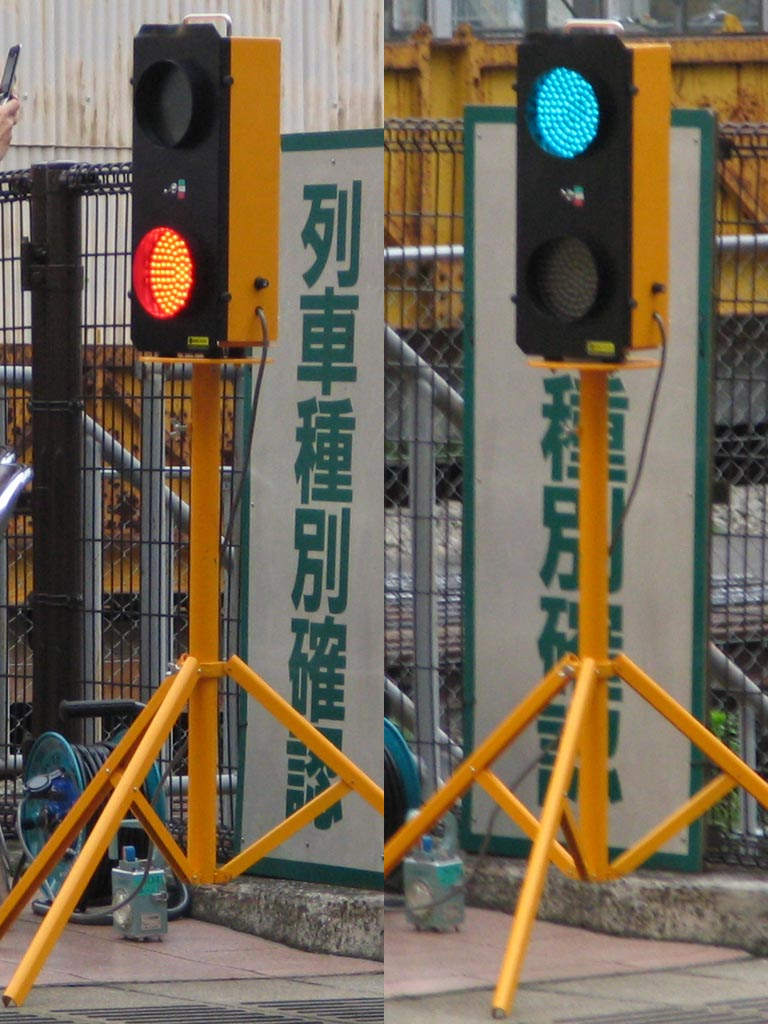
Substitutes for hand signals

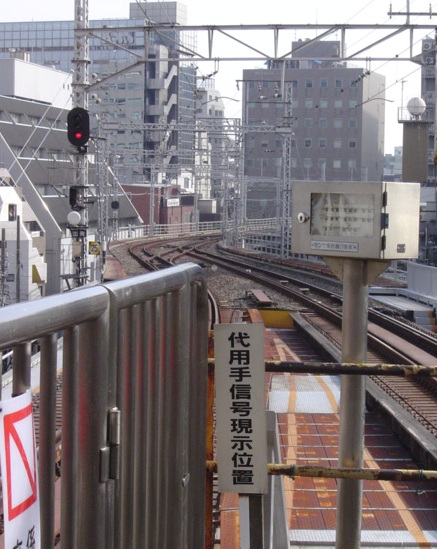
Installation position for substitute hand signals

A hand signal (手信号, teshingō) is used when signal equipment breaks down and a replacement is not yet installed. A flag, lamp, sign or similar device is used.

=== Substitute ===
A substitute hand signal (代用手信号, daiyō teshingō) is used instead of hand signals when a home (or starting signal) is out of order. At some stations, an installation position is prepared in advance.

=== Passing ===
A passing hand signal (通過手信号, tsūka teshingō) is used to substitute for a passing signal when the latter is out of order.

=== Temporary ===
A temporary hand signal (臨時手信号, rinji teshingō) is used when hand signals (other than substitute hand and passing signals) are necessary.

== Special signals ==
Special signals (特殊信号, tokushu shingō) are used in emergency situations:

- Fusee (発炎信号, hatsuen shingō): Flare used to indicate danger; also used to indicate stopping position for train
- Alarm signal (発報信号, happō shingō): Device which plays an alarm signal over the train radio, allowing it to be heard in the cab
- Flashing light signal (発光信号, hakkō shingō): Flashing light, indicating danger

=== Obstruction-warning signal ===
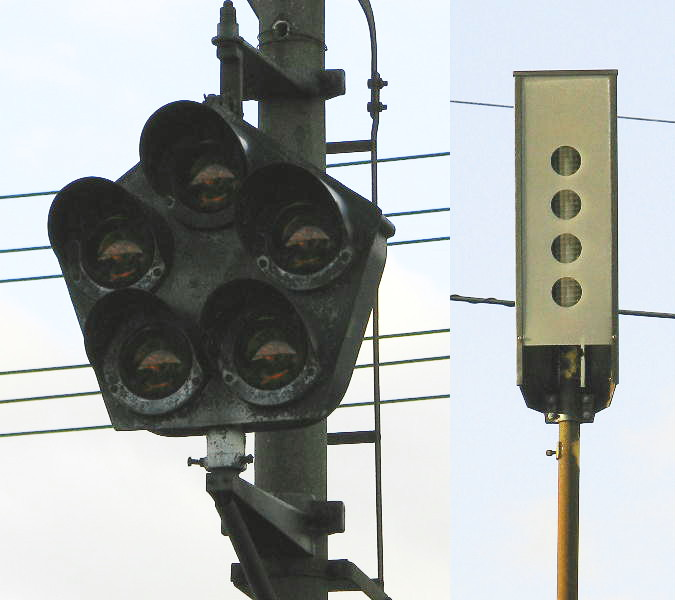
Obstruction warning signals (left, rotation type; right, flashing type)

An obstruction-warning signal (特殊信号発光機, tokushu shingō hakkōki or 特発, tokuhatsu) informs a train driver about an unusual situation on (or near) the track, requiring them to stop immediately. The signal consists of bright red lights, most often high-intensity LED lamps.

An example is an automobile detected by an obstruction detector (踏切障害物検知装置, fumikiri shōgaibutsu kenchi sōchi) stuck at a level crossing, activating the obstruction-warning device at the crossing. Another use is to guard against rockfalls; detection wires are installed at the bottom of cliffs, activating the signal when the wires are broken by rocks. On some platforms, emergency buttons or detection mats activate the obstruction-warning signal (mounted on the home signal) if a person falls on the track. Obstruction-warning signals are installed at the entrance of long tunnels or areas of dense traffic (such as quadruple-track sections); these activate if an accident is detected, preventing further damage.

An obstruction-warning signal is normally five red lamps arranged in a pentagon, with pairs of lights lit in sequence around the circle. This version is often called クルクルパー(kuru kuru pā) in slang; the "kuru kuru" sound is associated with rotation (the phrase is used when twirling a finger by the ear to indicate craziness, similar to the western gesture). Another design for this signal is a vertical group of rapidly blinking red lights (often called a "Corncob"(トウモロコシ, toumorokoshi) due to the resemblance).

== Railway-signal manufacturers ==
- Kyosan Electric Manufacturing Co. Ltd.(京三製作所, Kyōsan seisakusho)
- Nippon Signal Co. Ltd.(日本信号, Nippon shingō)
- Daido Signal Co. Ltd.(大同信号, Daidō shingō)

== See also ==
- Pointing and calling
- Category:Signal Ground in Japan
