= Matsusaka =

Matsusaka 松阪市
- City
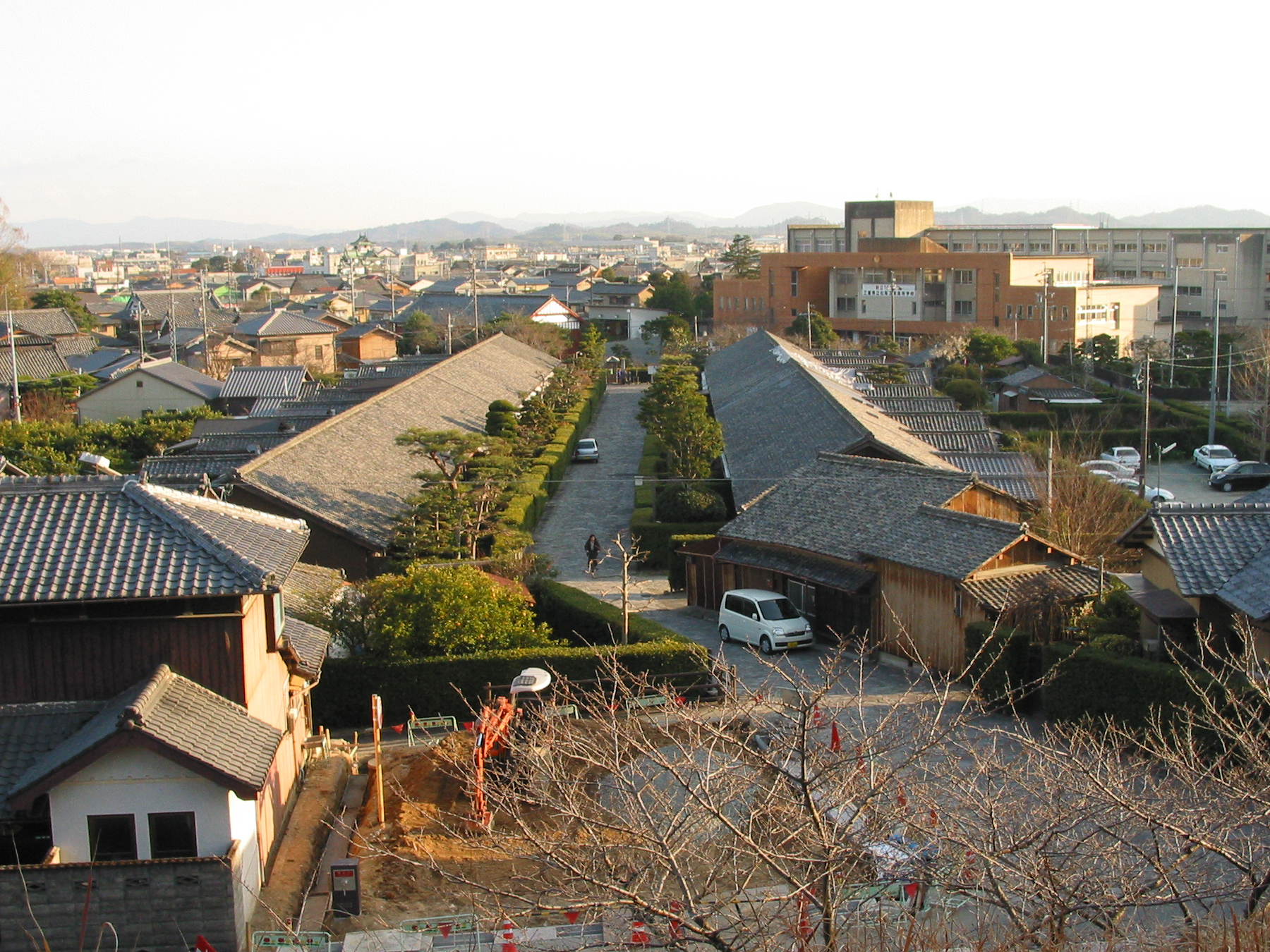
- Traditional street in central Matsusaka

- Flag Emblem

- Location of Matsusaka in Mie Prefecture

- Coordinates: 34°34′40.6″N 136°31′39.3″E
- Country: Japan
- Region: Kansai
- Prefecture: Mie

Government
  - Mayor: Masato Takegami

Area
  - Total: 623.64 km^{2} (240.79 sq mi)

Population (August 2021)
  - Total: 157,235
  - Density: 252.12/km^{2} (653.00/sq mi)
- Time zone: UTC+9 (Japan Standard Time)
- Phone number: 0598-53-4311
- Address: 1340-1 Tonomachi, Matsusaka-shi, Mie-ken 515-8515
- Climate: Cfa
- Website: Official website
- Symbols
- Bird: Japanese bush-warbler
- Flower: Lilium auratum
- Tree: Pine

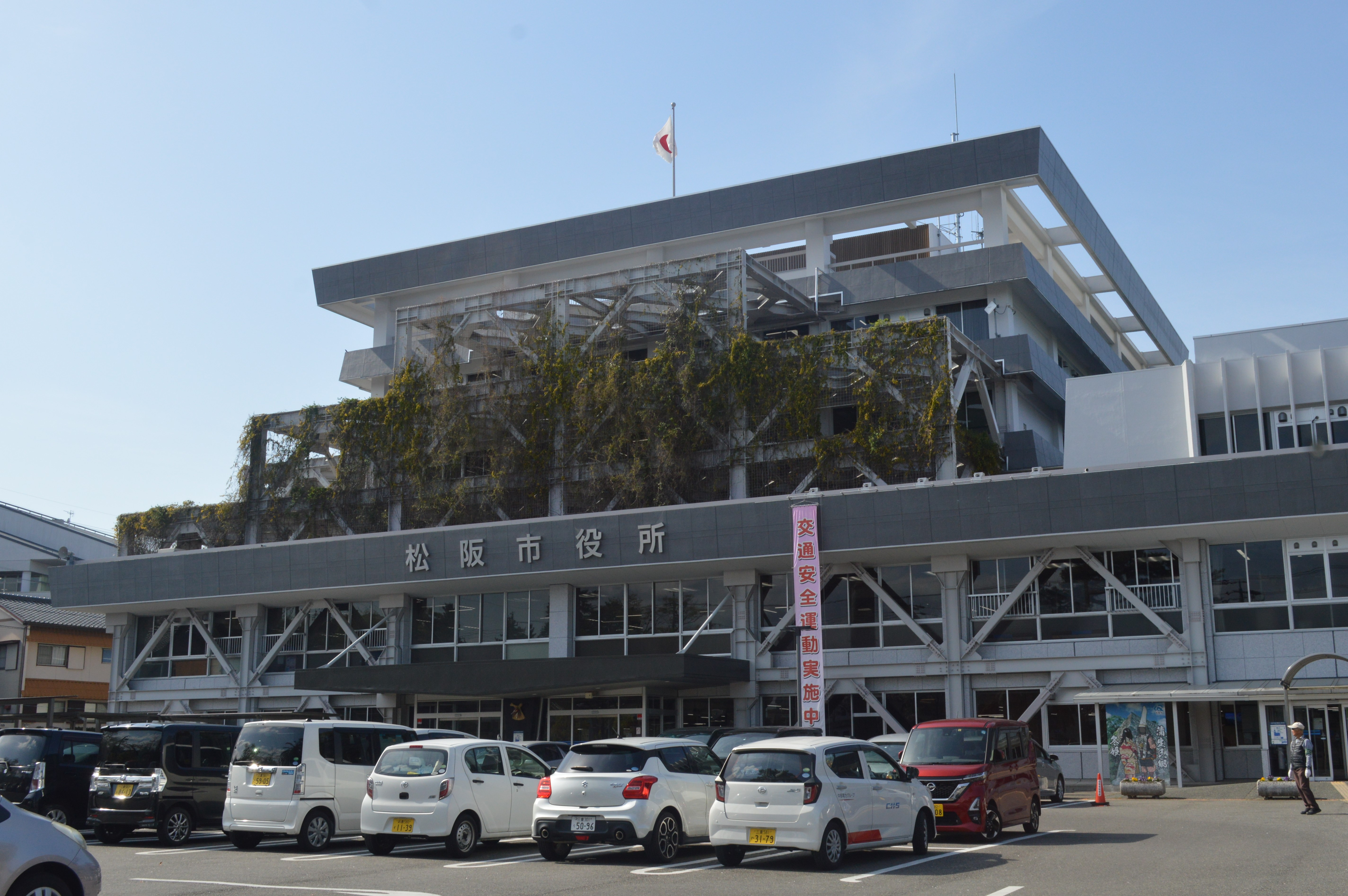
Matsusaka City Hall

Matsusaka (松阪市, Matsusaka-shi; Local dialect: Mattsaka or Massaka) is a city located in Mie Prefecture, Japan. As of 1 August 2021, the city had an estimated population of 157,235 in 66,018 households and a population density of 250 people per km^{2}. The total area of the city is 623.64 square kilometres (240.79 sq mi). The city is famous for Matsusaka beef.

== Geography ==
Matsusaka is located in east-central Kii Peninsula, in central Mie Prefecture. It stretches the width of Mie Prefecture, and is bordered by Ise Bay on the Pacific Ocean to the east, and Nara Prefecture to the west. Parts of the city are within the limits of the Yoshino-Kumano National Park.

=== Climate ===
Matsusaka has a Humid subtropical climate (Köppen Cfa) characterized by warm summers and cool winters with light to no snowfall. The average annual temperature in Matsusaka is 14.8 °C (58.6 °F). The average annual rainfall is 2,157.8 mm (84.95 in) with September as the wettest month. The temperatures are highest on average in August, at around 26.1 °C (79.0 °F), and lowest in January, at around 4.2 °C (39.6 °F).

Climate data for Kayumi, Matsusaka (1991−2020 normals, extremes 1979−present)
Month	Jan	Feb	Mar	Apr	May	Jun	Jul	Aug	Sep	Oct	Nov	Dec	Year
Record high °C (°F)	19.4 (66.9)	22.7 (72.9)	26.5 (79.7)	31.4 (88.5)	33.7 (92.7)	36.1 (97.0)	38.5 (101.3)	38.9 (102.0)	37.3 (99.1)	31.3 (88.3)	27.3 (81.1)	24.8 (76.6)	38.9 (102.0)
Mean daily maximum °C (°F)	9.4 (48.9)	10.4 (50.7)	14.1 (57.4)	19.6 (67.3)	24.0 (75.2)	26.7 (80.1)	30.8 (87.4)	31.9 (89.4)	28.0 (82.4)	22.4 (72.3)	17.1 (62.8)	11.9 (53.4)	20.5 (68.9)
Daily mean °C (°F)	4.2 (39.6)	4.7 (40.5)	8.0 (46.4)	13.0 (55.4)	17.8 (64.0)	21.4 (70.5)	25.4 (77.7)	26.1 (79.0)	22.7 (72.9)	17.0 (62.6)	11.2 (52.2)	6.2 (43.2)	14.8 (58.7)
Mean daily minimum °C (°F)	−0.5 (31.1)	−0.3 (31.5)	2.3 (36.1)	6.8 (44.2)	12.2 (54.0)	17.1 (62.8)	21.3 (70.3)	21.9 (71.4)	18.6 (65.5)	12.4 (54.3)	6.0 (42.8)	1.2 (34.2)	9.9 (49.8)
Record low °C (°F)	−7.2 (19.0)	−6.9 (19.6)	−5.8 (21.6)	−3.0 (26.6)	2.1 (35.8)	7.2 (45.0)	13.8 (56.8)	13.6 (56.5)	8.8 (47.8)	1.0 (33.8)	−3.0 (26.6)	−6.1 (21.0)	−7.2 (19.0)
Average precipitation mm (inches)	56.1 (2.21)	63.0 (2.48)	115.5 (4.55)	143.3 (5.64)	188.4 (7.42)	231.3 (9.11)	247.0 (9.72)	272.3 (10.72)	400.7 (15.78)	255.4 (10.06)	95.9 (3.78)	61.6 (2.43)	2,157.8 (84.95)
Average precipitation days (≥ 1.0 mm)	6.5	7.3	10.7	10.0	10.7	13.7	13.1	11.4	12.8	10.7	6.9	6.7	120.5
Mean monthly sunshine hours	153.3	139.1	172.2	182.8	185.8	124.5	152.2	184.6	138.2	144.2	146.2	151.8	1,875
Source: Japan Meteorological Agency

=== Demographics ===
The population of Matsusaka has been increasing slowly over the past 50 years.

Historical population
Year	Pop.	±%
1950	147,054	—
1960	141,245	−4.0%
1970	139,161	−1.5%
1980	153,185	+10.1%
1990	159,625	+4.2%
2000	164,504	+3.1%
2010	168,146	+2.2%

== History ==
Matsusaka developed as a commercial center during the Sengoku period, and Oda Nobukatsu, the younger son of Oda Nobunaga built a castle in the area in 1580. The area came under the control of Gamō Ujisato shortly thereafter, and the Gamō began construction of a castle in the Yoiho forest (四五百森, Yoiho no mori) and named the site "Matsusaka," meaning "slope (坂) covered with pines (松)" in 1588. Matsusaka Castle was the center of the short-lived Matsusaka Domain in the early Tokugawa shogunate, but for most of the Edo period, the castle was the eastern outpost of Kishu Domain based at Wakayama Castle.

Following the Meiji restoration, the area became part of Mie Prefecture. The town of Matsusaka was created on April 1, 1889 with the establishment of the modern municipalities system. The second kanji character of Matsusaka was changed to 阪 from 坂 in those days. On March 26, 1893, 1318 houses in the town were destroyed in a fire. Matsusaka was raised to city status on February 1, 1933. The city suffered only light damage in World War II, when an air raid killed four people on February 4, 1945. About 700 houses in the city were destroyed by a fire on December 16, 1951. On October 15, 1956, a major railway accident occurred at Rokken Station on the outskirts of the city, killing 42 people. On August 1, 1982, Typhoon Bess left nine people dead in its wake. The city officially celebrated its 500th anniversary in 1988.

On January 1, 2005, the city expanded to its present borders, with the absorption the towns of Mikumo and Ureshino (both from Ichishi District), and the towns of Iinan and Iitaka (both from Iinan District).

== Government ==
Matsusaka has a mayor-council form of government with a directly elected mayor and a unicameral city council of 28 members. Matsusaka contributes four members to the Mie Prefectural Assembly. In terms of national politics, the city is part of Mie 1st district of the lower house of the Diet of Japan.

== Education ==
Matsusaka has 36 public elementary schools and 12 public middle schools operated by the city government and four public high schools operated by the Mie Prefectural Board of Education. There are also one private middle school and two private high schools. The prefectural also operates two special education schools for the handicapped. Mie Chukyo University, formerly located in Matsusaka, closed in 2013.

== Transportation ==
=== Railway ===
JR Tōkai – Kisei Main Line

- Rokken - Matsusaka - Tokuwa

JR Tōkai – Meishō Line

- Matsusaka - Kaminoshō - Gongemmae

Kintetsu Railway - Osaka Line

- Ise-Nakagawa

Kintetsu Railway -Nagoya Line

- Ise-Nakagawa

Kintetsu Railway - Yamada Line

- Ise-Nakagawa - Ise-Nakahara - Matsugasaki - Matsusaka - Higashi-Matsusaka - Kushida - Koishiro

=== Highway ===
- Ise Expressway
- National Route 23
- National Route 42
- National Route 166
- National Route 368
- National Route 422

=== Seaports ===
- Port of Matsusaka

== Sister cities ==
- Binhu District, Wuxi, Jiangsu Province, China

== Local attractions ==
- Azaka Castle ruins
- Matsusaka Castle ruins
- Takarazuka kofun ancient burial mound

== Notable people ==
- Yotsukasa Dai, sumo wrestler
- Aki Deguchi, J-pop idol and singer
- Keisuke Funatani, professional soccer player
- Satoshi Hida, professional soccer player
- Hiroki Mizumoto, professional soccer player
- Tetsuo Morimoto, politician
- Masaharu Nakagawa, politician
- Kana Nishino, J-pop/R&B singer
- Motoori Norinaga, Edo period kokugaku scholar
- Ikuzo Saito, Olympic wrestler
- Matsuura Takeshirō, explorer, cartographer, writer, painter, priest, and antiquarian
- Mitsui Takatoshi, founder of the Mitsui group.
- Norihisa Tamura, politician
- Mienoumi Tsuyoshi, sumo wrestler
- Ben Wada, film director
