= Yoros =

Yoros may refer to:

- Yoros Castle, Turkey
- Yōrō Mountains, the Yōrōs, in Japan

== See also ==
- Yoro (disambiguation)
