= Yoro (disambiguation) =

Yoro is a city in Honduras.

Yoro may refer to:

== Places ==
- Yoro Department, Honduras
  - Yoro Airport
  - Roman Catholic Diocese of Yoro
- Yōrō, Gifu, Japan
  - Yōrō District, Gifu, Japan
  - Yōrō Mountains, Japan
    - Mount Yōrō, the central peak
  - Yōrō Station, a rail station
- Yōrō River, in Chiba Prefecture, Japan
- Yoro, Mali
- Yoro (crater), a crater on Mars

== People ==
- Jacob Yoro (born 1979), American football coach
- Leny Yoro (born 2005), French footballer
- Yoro Dyao (1847-1919), Wolof noble of Senegal
- Yoro Diakité (1932-1973), Malian politician
- Yoro Lamine Ly (born 1988), Senegalese footballer

== Other uses ==
- Yōrō, a Japanese era name
- Yoro F.C., a football team in Yoro, Honduras

== See also ==
- Yōrō Code, a code of laws in Nara-era Japan
- Yōrō Railway Yōrō Line
