= Ibi-Sekigahara-Yōrō Quasi-National Park =

Quasi-national park in Gifu prefecture, Japan

- 揖斐関ヶ原養老国定公園
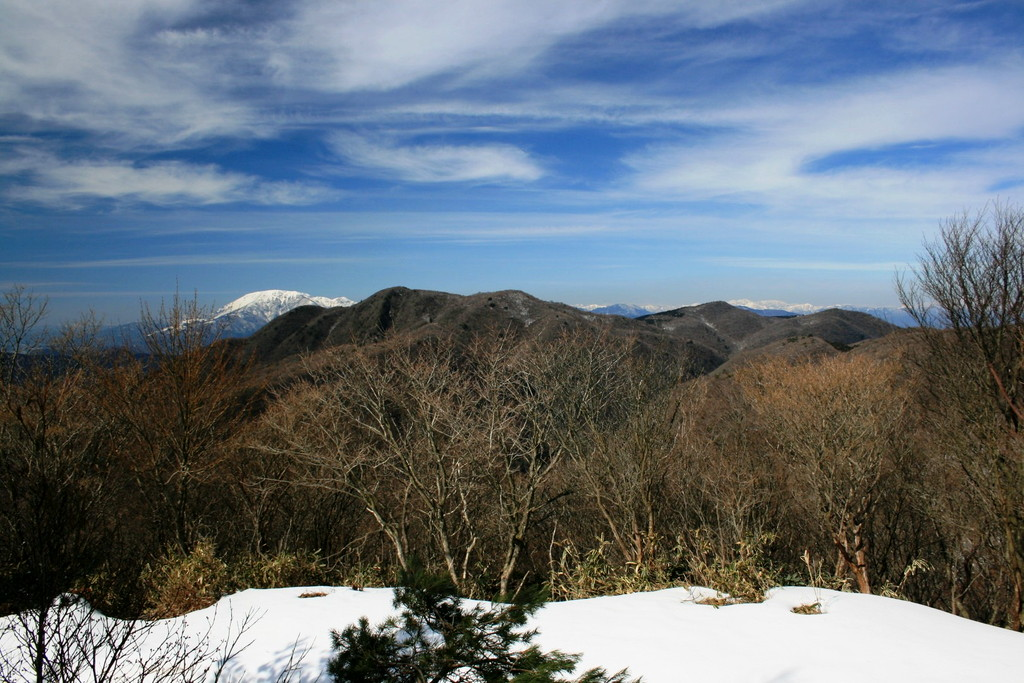
- View from Mount Yōrō

- Location within Japan
- Location: Gifu Prefecture, Japan
- Coordinates: 35.471°N 136.392°E
- Area: 202.19 km^{2} (78.07 sq mi)
- Established: 28 December 1970

Ibi-Sekigahara-Yōrō Quasi-National Park (揖斐関ヶ原養老国定公園, Ibi-Sekigahara-Yōrō Kokutei Kōen) is a Quasi-National Park in southwest Gifu Prefecture, Japan. The park was established in 1970.

== Attractions ==
Ibi Gorge (揖斐峡), Ibi River, Kegon-ji (華厳寺), Mount Ikeda, Mount Yōrō, Sekigahara Battlefield, Tōkai Nature Trail, Yōrō Falls

== Related municipalities ==
Ibigawa, Ikeda, Kaizu, Motosu, Ōgaki, Sekigahara, Tarui, Yōrō

== See also ==
- National Parks of Japan
- Hida-Kisogawa Quasi-National Park
