= A Tour of the Waterfalls of the Provinces =

Series of woodblock prints by Katsushika Hokusai

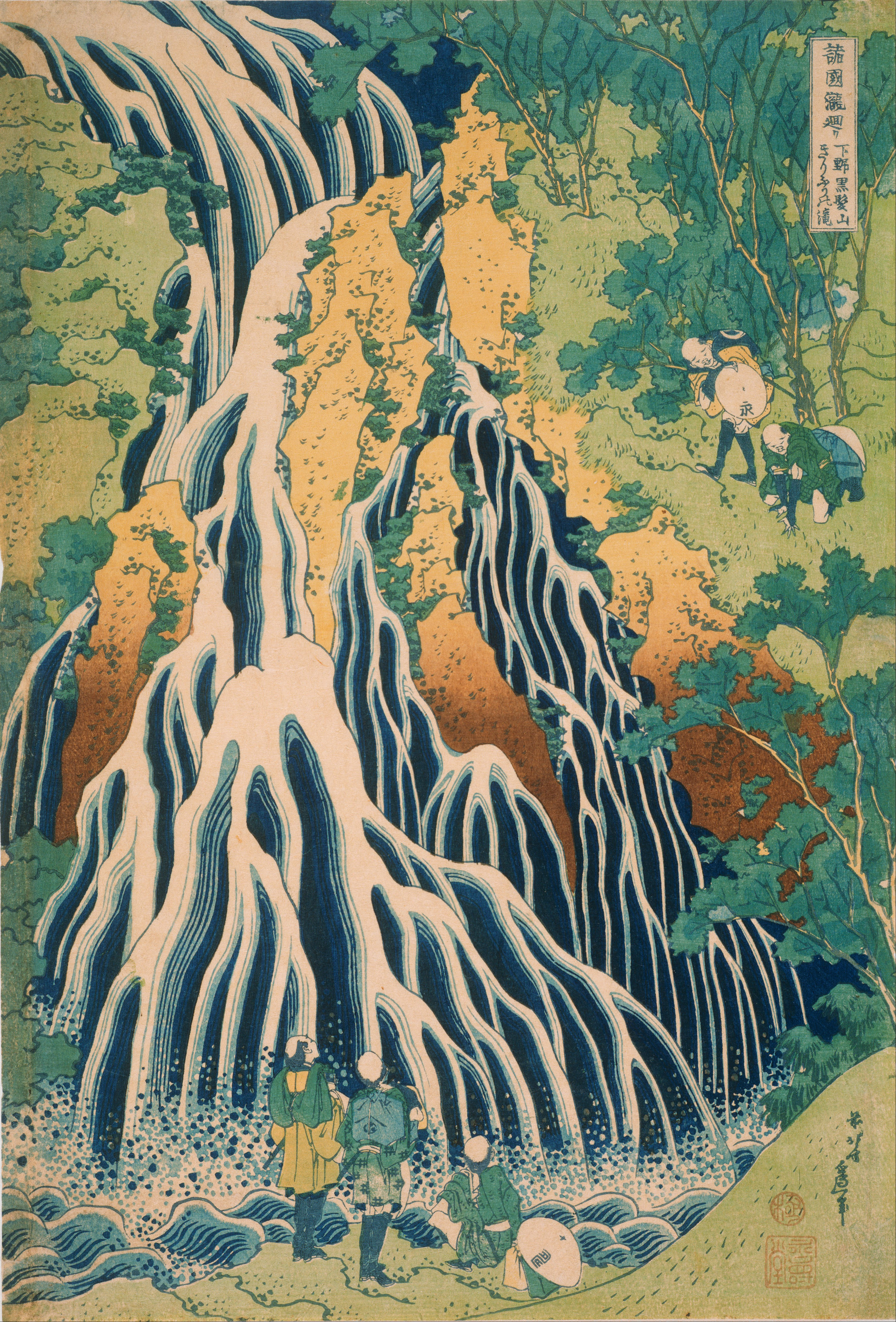
Kirifuri Waterfall at Kurokami Mountain in Shimotsuke, 1831-1833

A Tour of the Waterfalls of the Provinces (Shokoku taki meguri) is a series of landscape woodblock prints by the Japanese ukiyo-e artist Hokusai.

Completed c. 1833-1834 and containing eight prints, it was the first ukiyo-e series to approach the theme of falling water, and was acclaimed for its innovative and expressive depictions. The waterfalls take up most of each sheet, dwarfing the scenes' human inhabitants, and are rendered by Hokusai with a powerful sense of life, reflecting his animistic beliefs.

== Background ==
Hokusai was a follower of Nichiren Buddhism. Buddhism in Japan was entwined with Shinto's older animistic beliefs: that gods and spirits inhabit the surrounding nature, such as trees, rocks or animals. The waterfalls Hokusai chose to illustrate are located in the central, western and eastern parts of Japan's main island (Honshu). The regions chosen were well known sites of pilgrimage by the travelers of his time. Some have been forgotten, but the waterfalls, Kirifuri, Amida and Yōrō, are among Japan's 100 most beautiful even today.

== Content ==
In the Waterfall series, using newly imported Prussian blue pigment that was fashionable at that time, Hokusai paints each waterfall differently, in order to emphasize the unique beauty of each site and to outline his belief that water was sacred. All the prints are in vertical format. Hokusai uses an abundance of color, in order to highlight the new and main theme: the falling water. Besides using imported blue pigments, the artist also adds contrasting yellows, browns and greens to paint the surrounding forested mountains.

Two highlights from the series are Hokusai's depictions of Kirifuri and Amida waterfalls. In Kirifuri, the waterfall appears to be alive, described as a "fierce alien" with "tentacles expanding and contracting". In Amida, Hokusai combines two different points of view with in one scene. The round gorge before the falls was considered to resemble the head of Buddha, and Hokusai renders it with a sense of mystery by depicting it from a bird's-eye view, while the rest of the scene is portrayed from the front. the print has been called "a masterpiece of landscape art".

== Image gallery ==
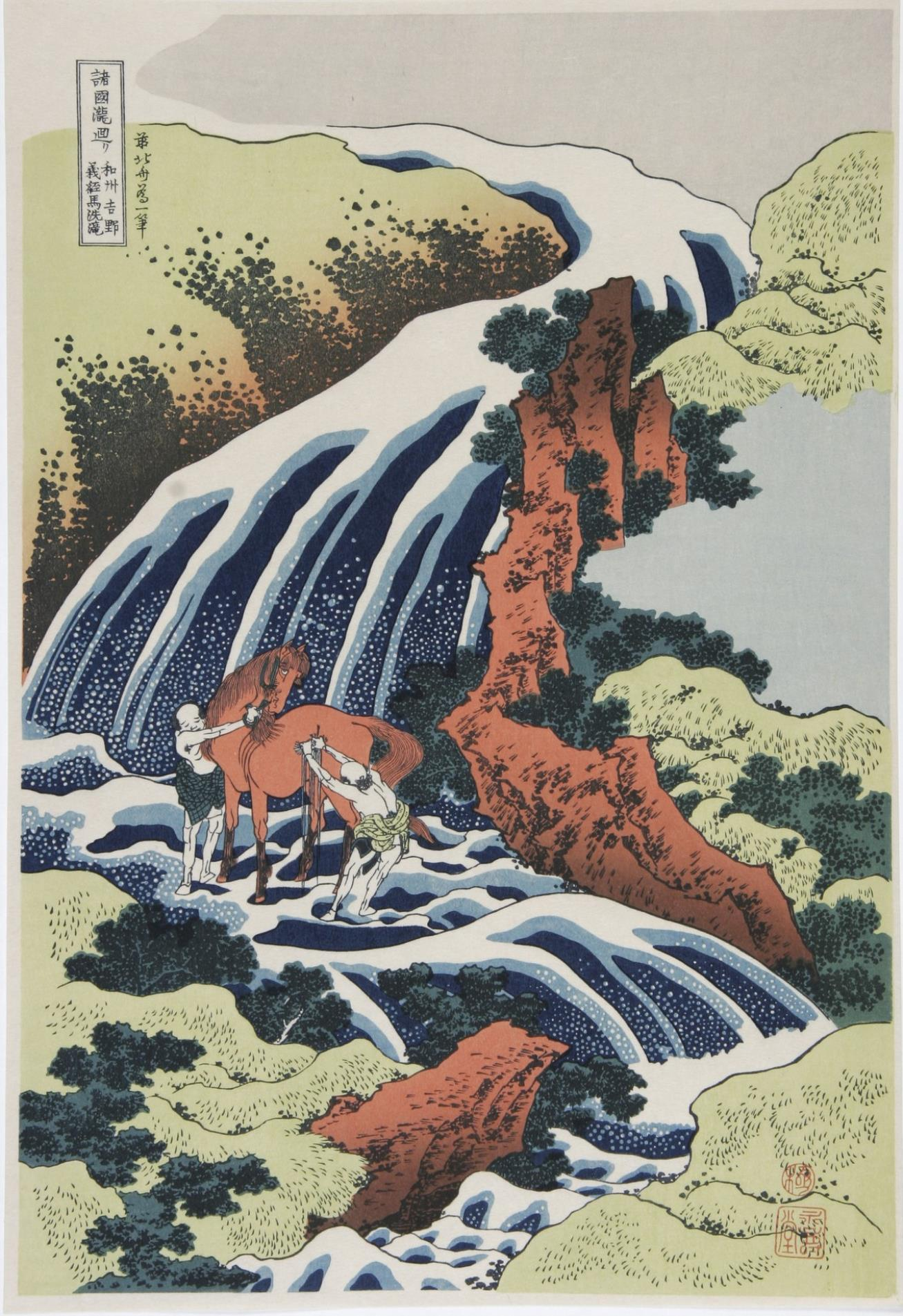
The Waterfall Where Yoshitsune Washed His Horse at Yoshino in Yamato Province (Washū Yoshino Yoshitsune uma arai no taki)

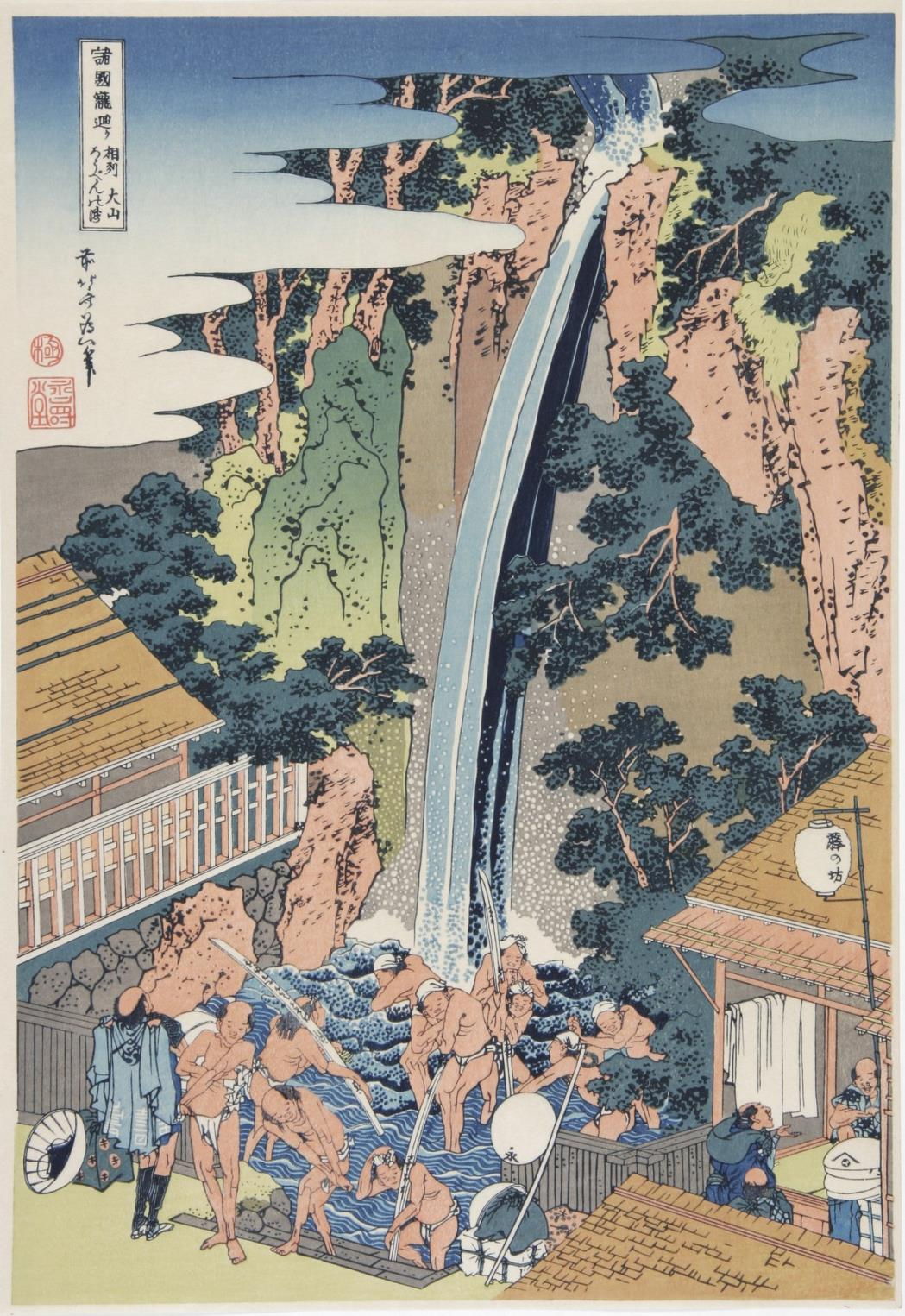
Rōben Waterfall at Ōyama in Sagami Province (Sōshū Ōyama Rōben no taki)

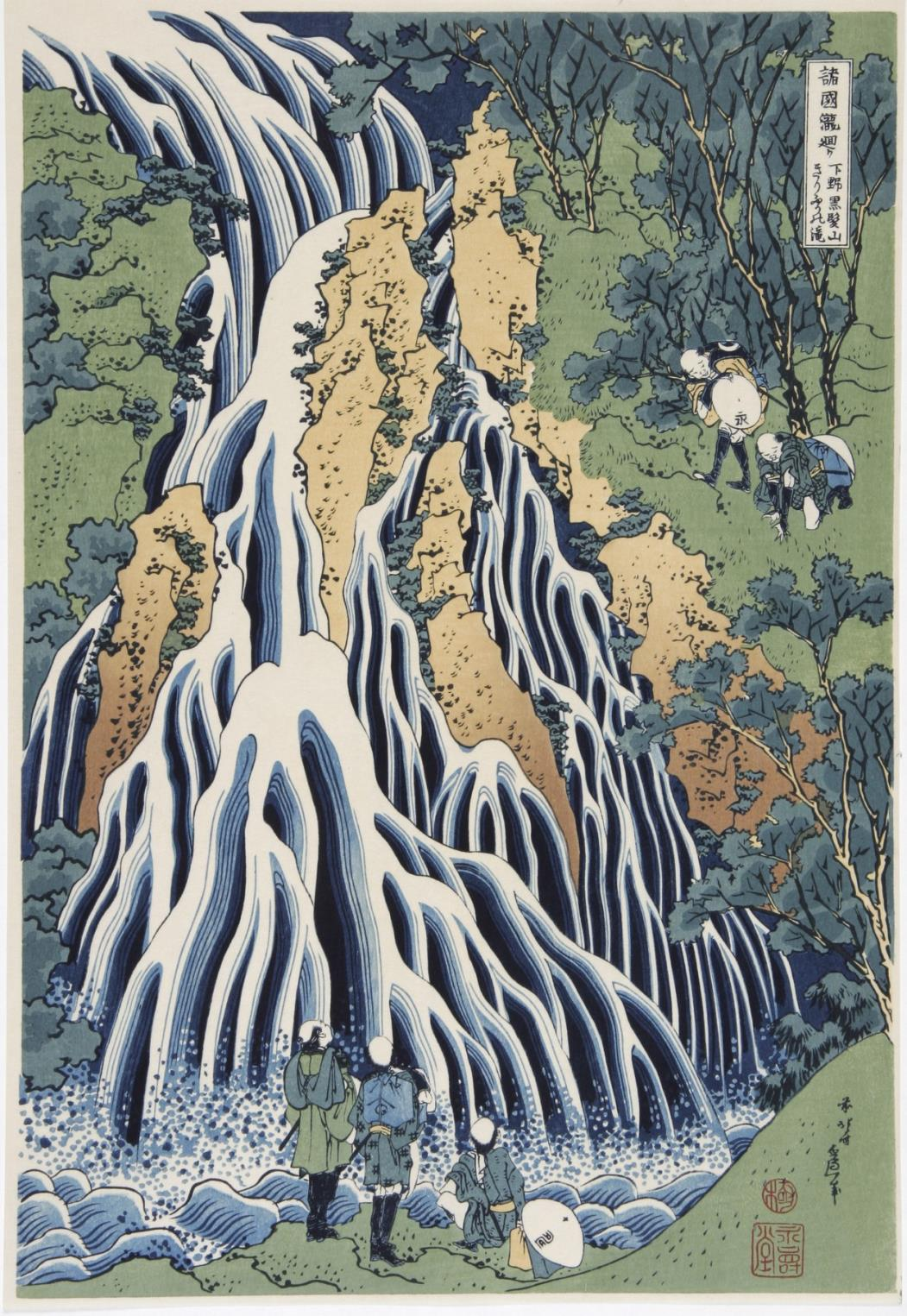
Kirifuri Waterfall at Kurokami Mountain in Shimotsuke (Shimotsuke Kurokamiyama Kirifuri no taki)

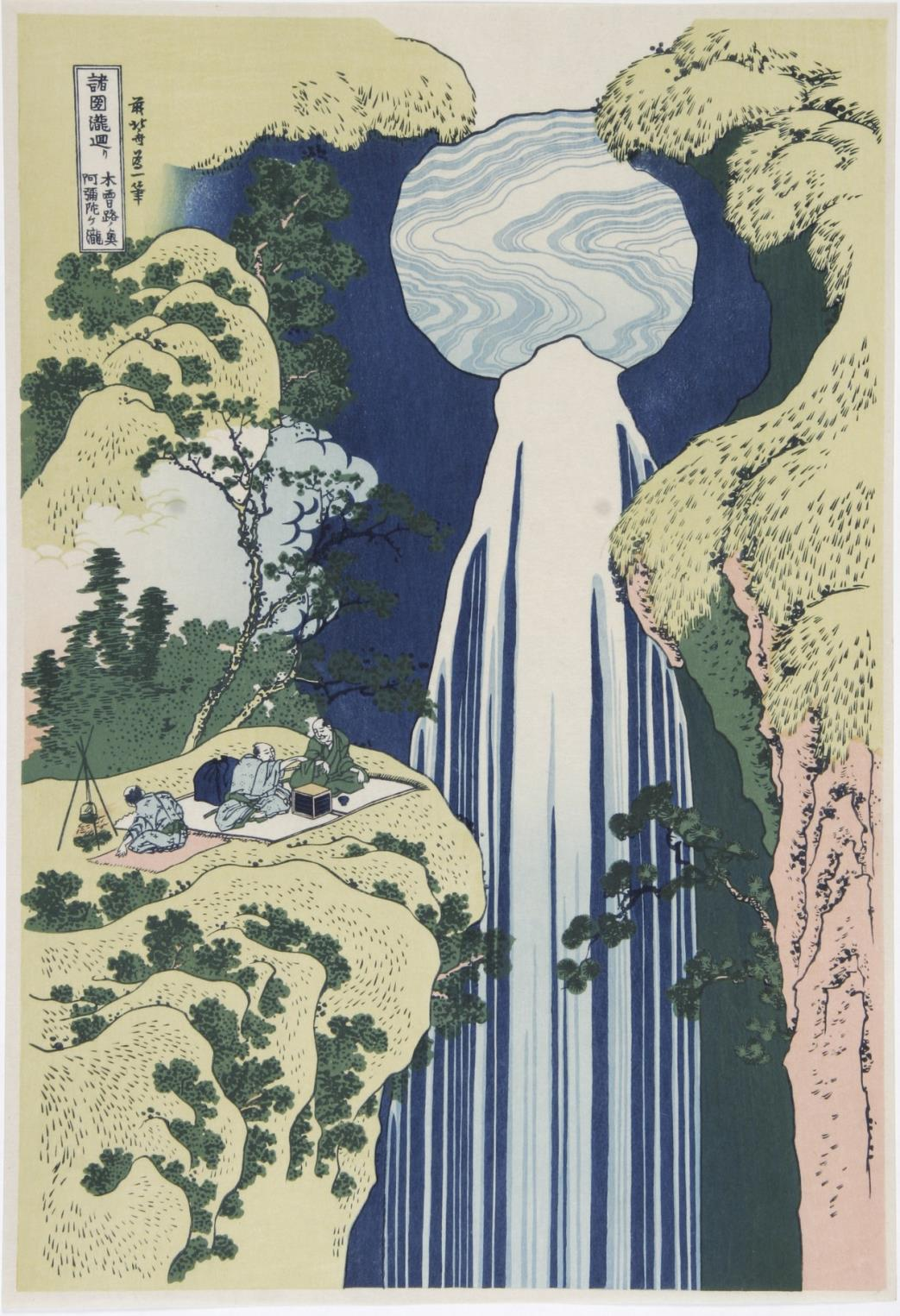
The Amida Falls in the Far Reaches of the Kisokaidō Road (Kisoji no oku Amida-ga-taki)

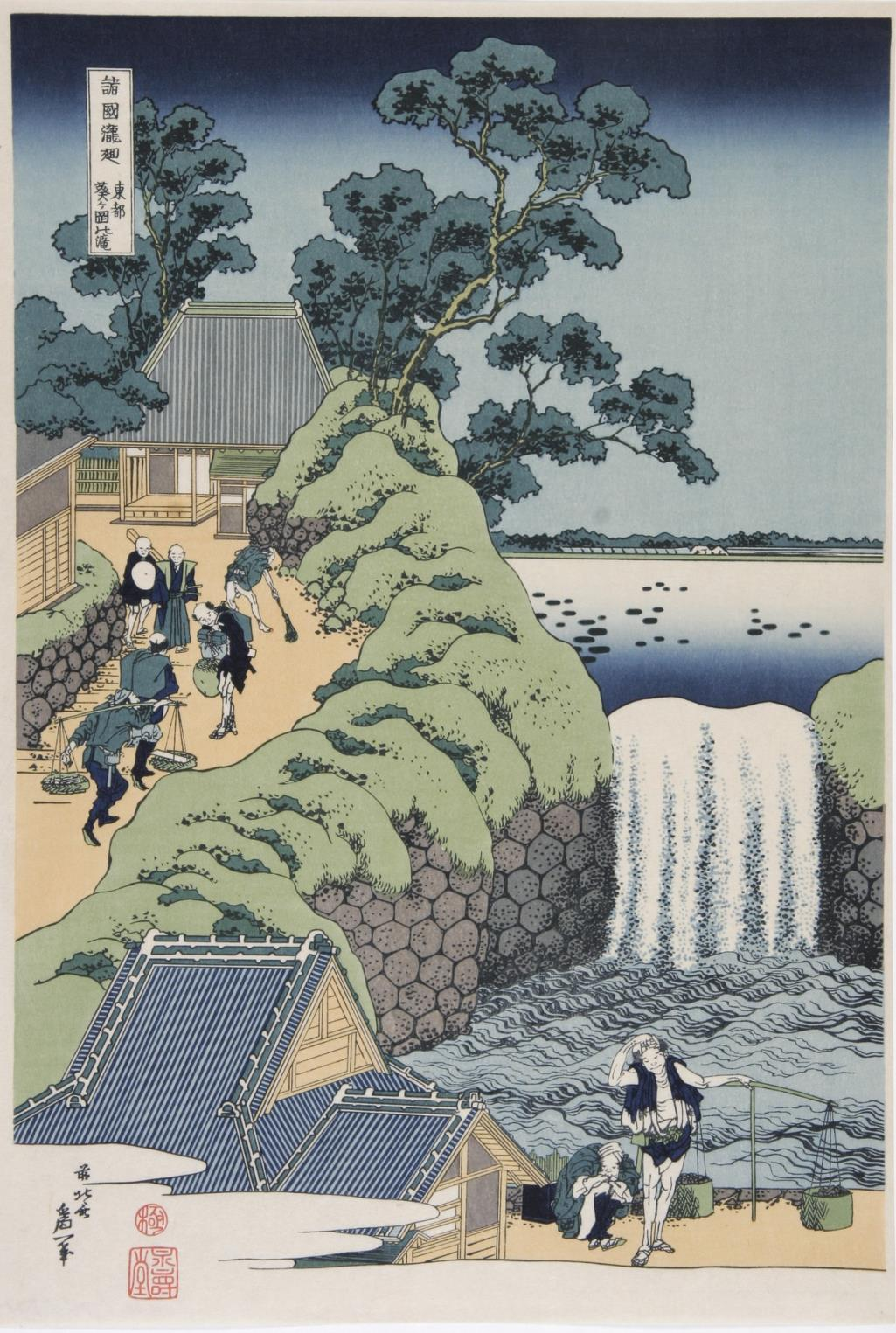
Aoigaoka Falls in the Eastern Capital (Toto Aoigaoka no taki)

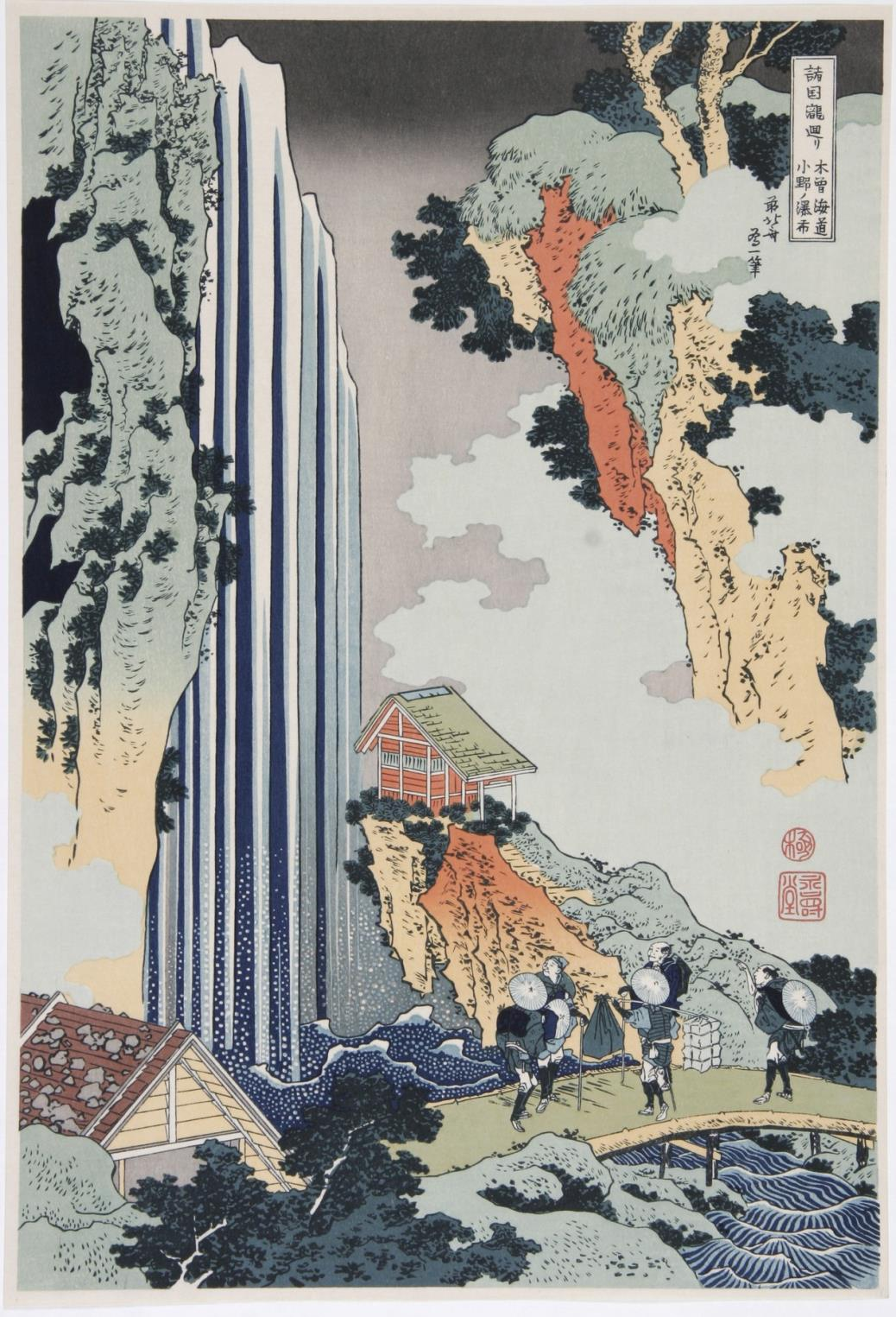
Ono Waterfall on the Kisokaidō (Kisokaidō Ono no bakufu)

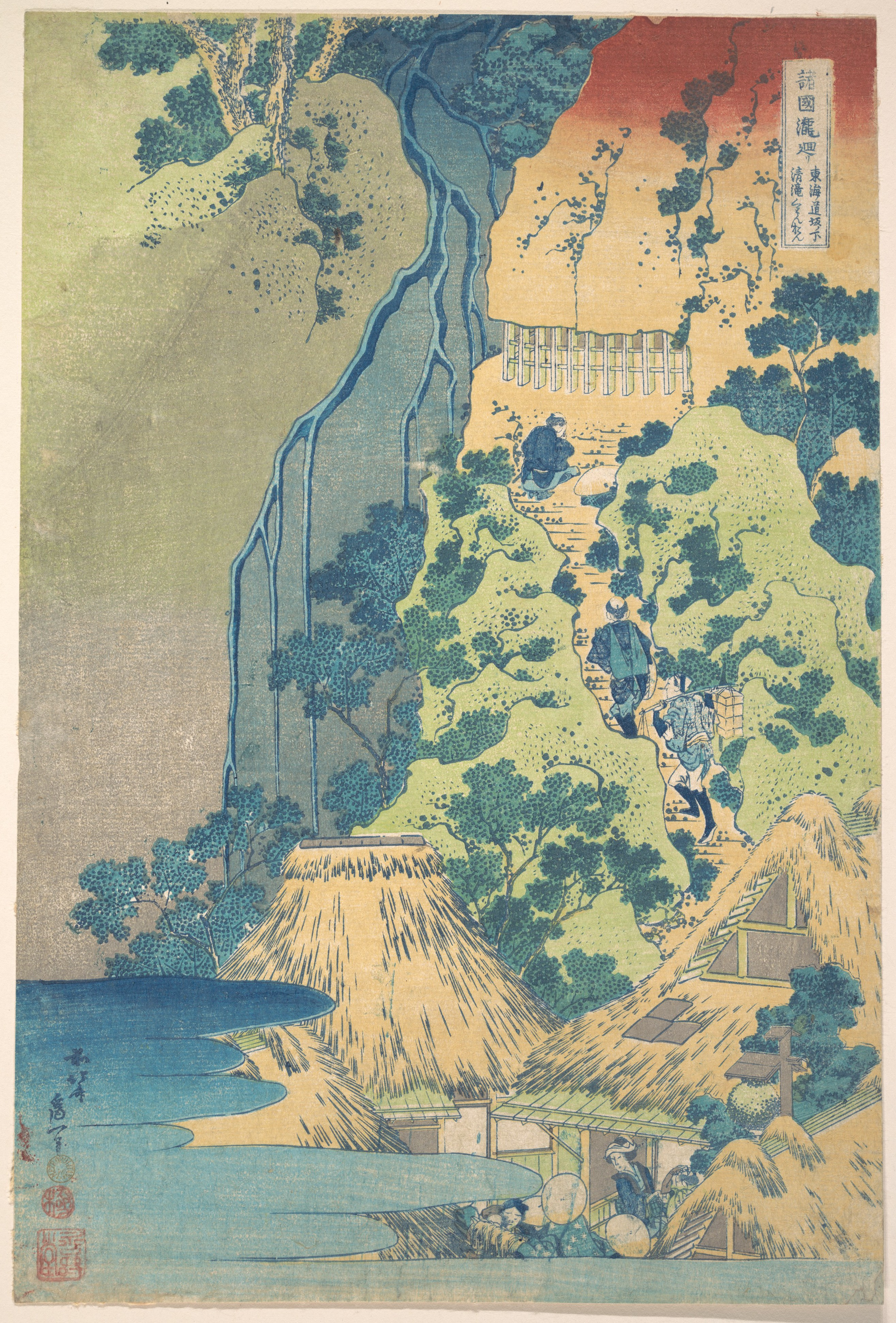
Kiyotaki Kannon Waterfall at Sakanoshita on the Tōkaidō (Tōkaidō Sakanoshita Kiyotaki kannon)

Yōrō Waterfall in Mino Province (Mino no Yōrō no taki)
