= Suigō Prefectural Natural Park =

Natural park of Mie prefecture, Japan

- 水郷県立自然公園
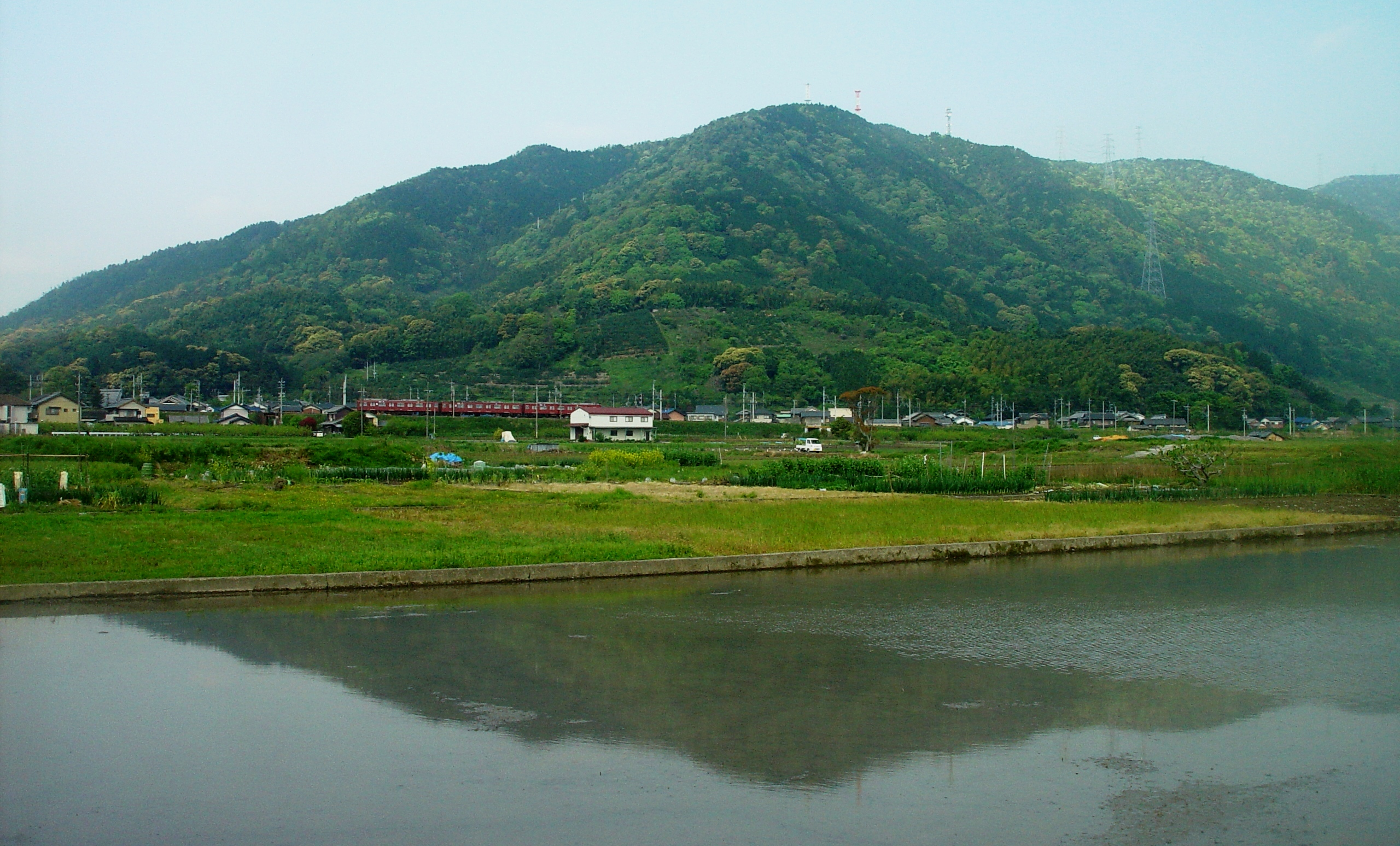
- Mount Tado (402.8 metres (1,322 ft))

- Location within Japan
- Location: Mie Prefecture, Japan
- Coordinates: 35°07′50″N 136°40′06″E
- Area: 68.42 square kilometres (26.42 sq mi)
- Established: 1 October 1953

Suigō Prefectural Natural Park (水郷県立自然公園, Suigō kenritsu shizen kōen) is a Prefectural Natural Park in northeast Mie Prefecture, Japan. Established in 1953, the park comprises one unified area that spans the borders of the municipalities of Kuwana and Kisosaki. In Heisei 16 (2004), nearly six-and-a-half million visitors entered the park, making it second in the prefecture, amongst its Natural Parks, to Ise-Shima National Park, and exceeding the number of visitors to Yoshino-Kumano National Park, Suzuka Quasi-National Park, and Murō-Akame-Aoyama Quasi-National Park. As of 31 March 2020, of its total designated area of 6,842 hectares (16,910 acres), state land totalled 2,362 hectares (5,840 acres), other public land 114 hectares (280 acres), and private land 4,366 hectares (10,790 acres).

The park consists of an Ordinary Zone to the East, in the Kiso-sansen alluvial delta, where the Ibi, Nagara, and Kiso Rivers flow down into Ise Bay, and a Special Zone (subdivided into Class 1, 2, and 3 Special Zones) to the northwest, around Mount Tado at the southern end of the Yōrō Mountains. To the northeast, the park adjoins Senbon-matsubara in Gifu Prefecture, a flood-control initiative following the 1754 Hōreki River incident, and now protected within Senbon Matsubara Prefectural Natural Park. Within the park, features of natural and cultural interest include Tado Taisha, the National Natural Monument Tado's Callery Pear Plant Communities, Japanese chinquapins, Gifu butterflies, Uga Jinja (宇賀神社), Nagashima onsen, and the remains of the landing of the Shichiri no watashi ferry crossing, between Kuwana-juku and Miya-juku, celebrated by Hiroshige in The Fifty-three Stations of the Tōkaidō, and designated a Prefectural Historic Site.

== Gallery ==
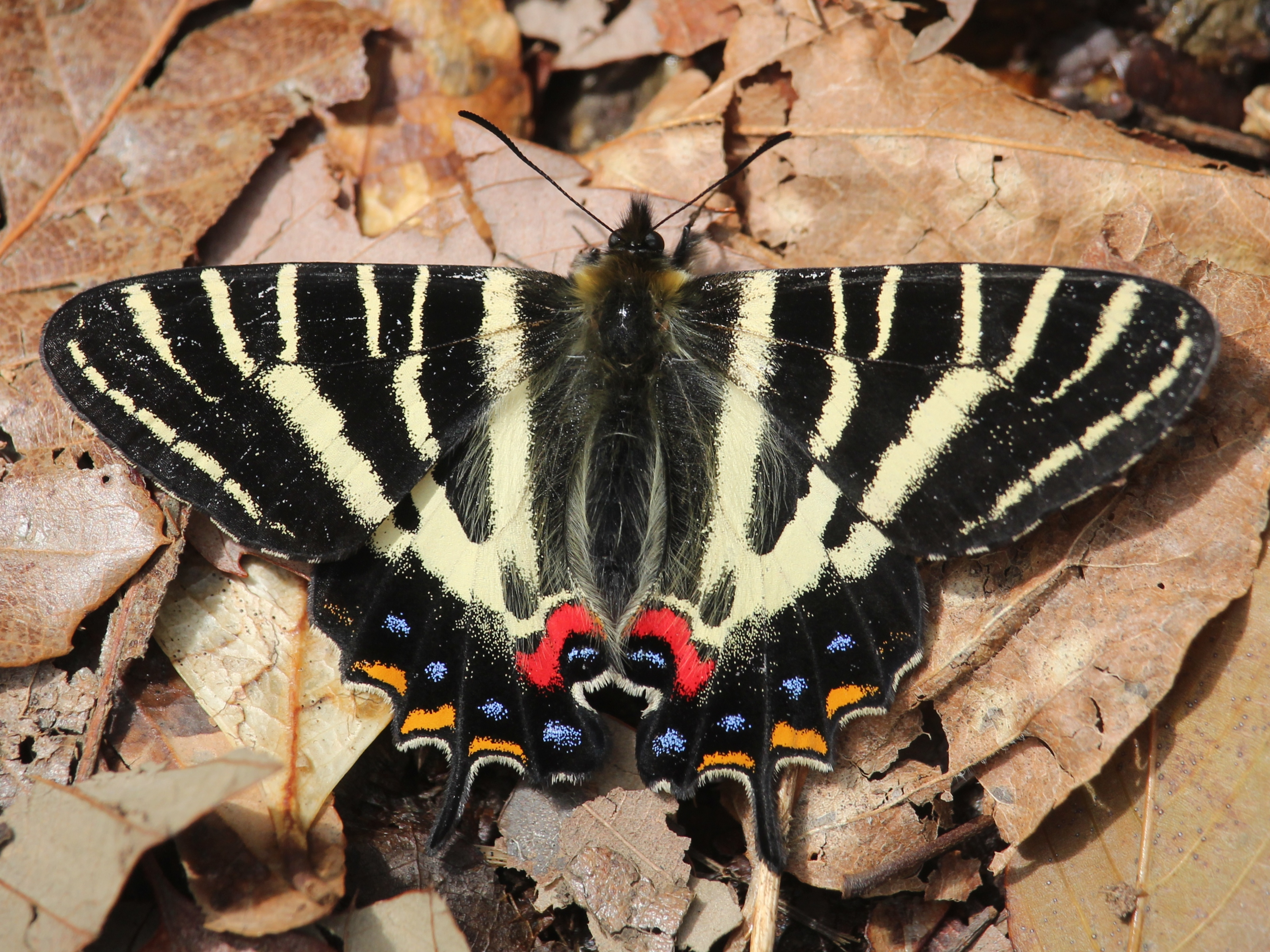
Gifu butterfly, in adjoining Aichi Prefecture

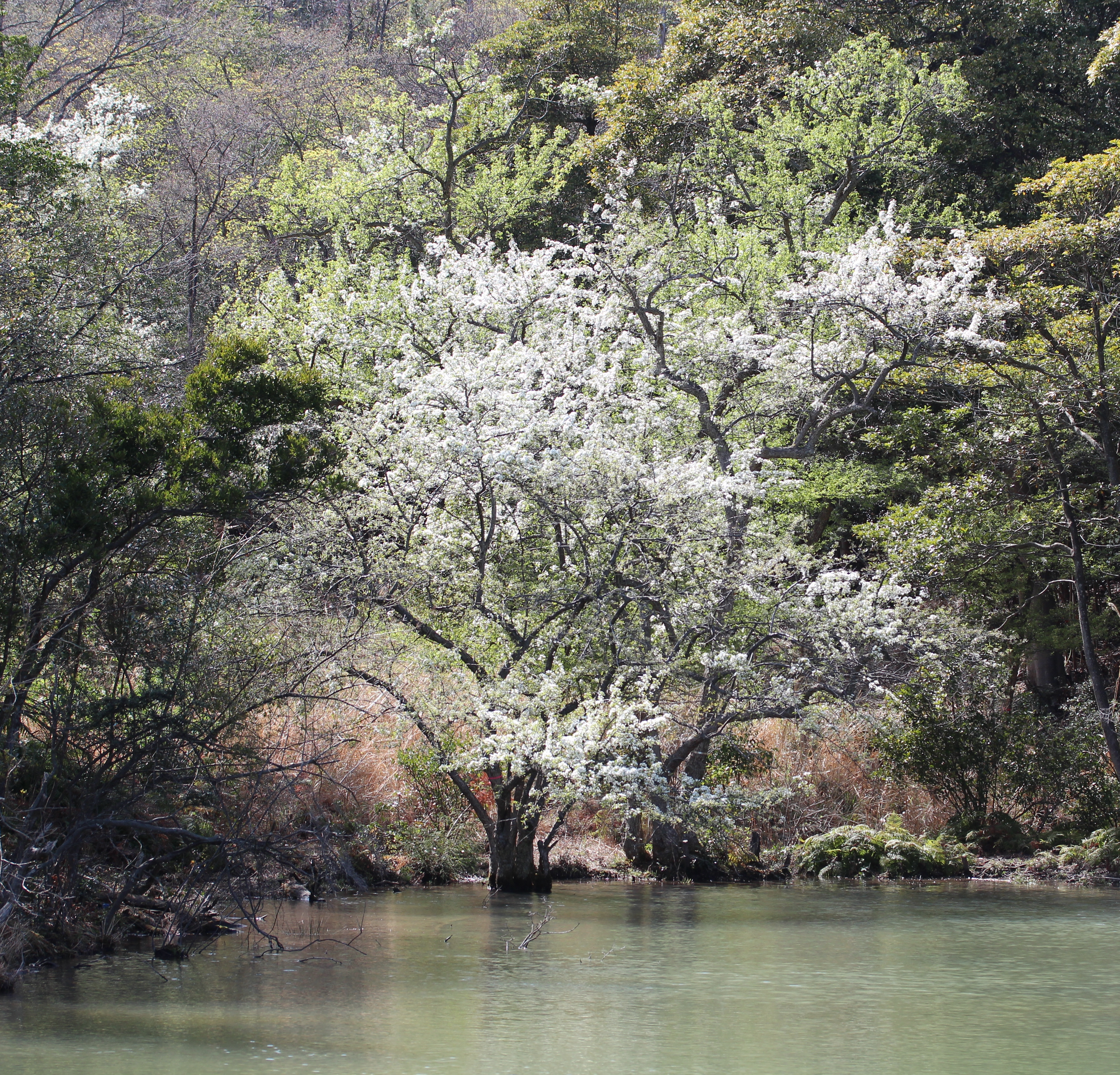
One of Mount Tado's Callery pears

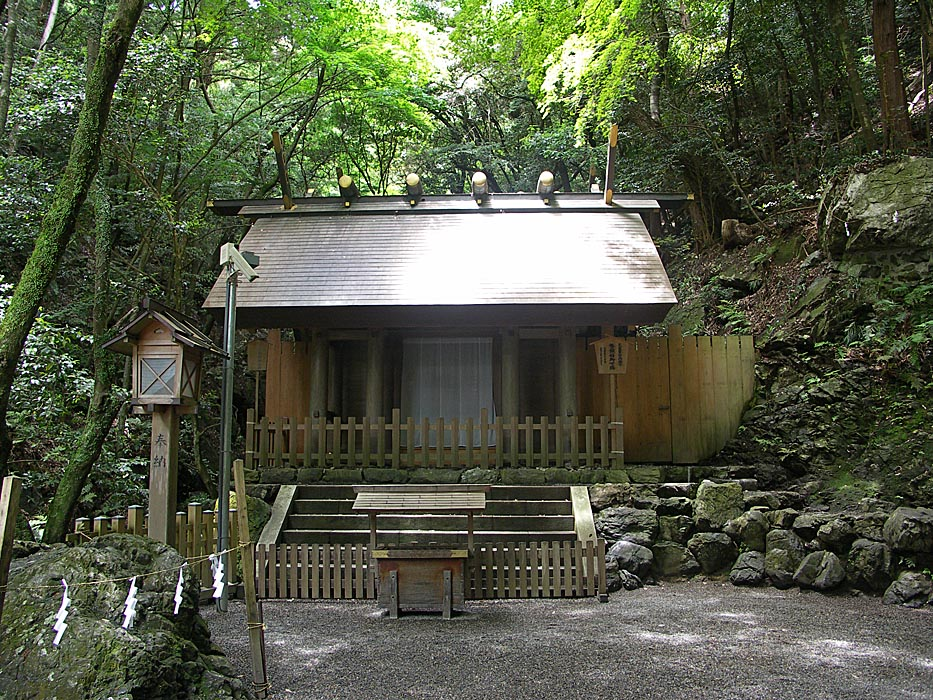
Honden of Tado Shrine

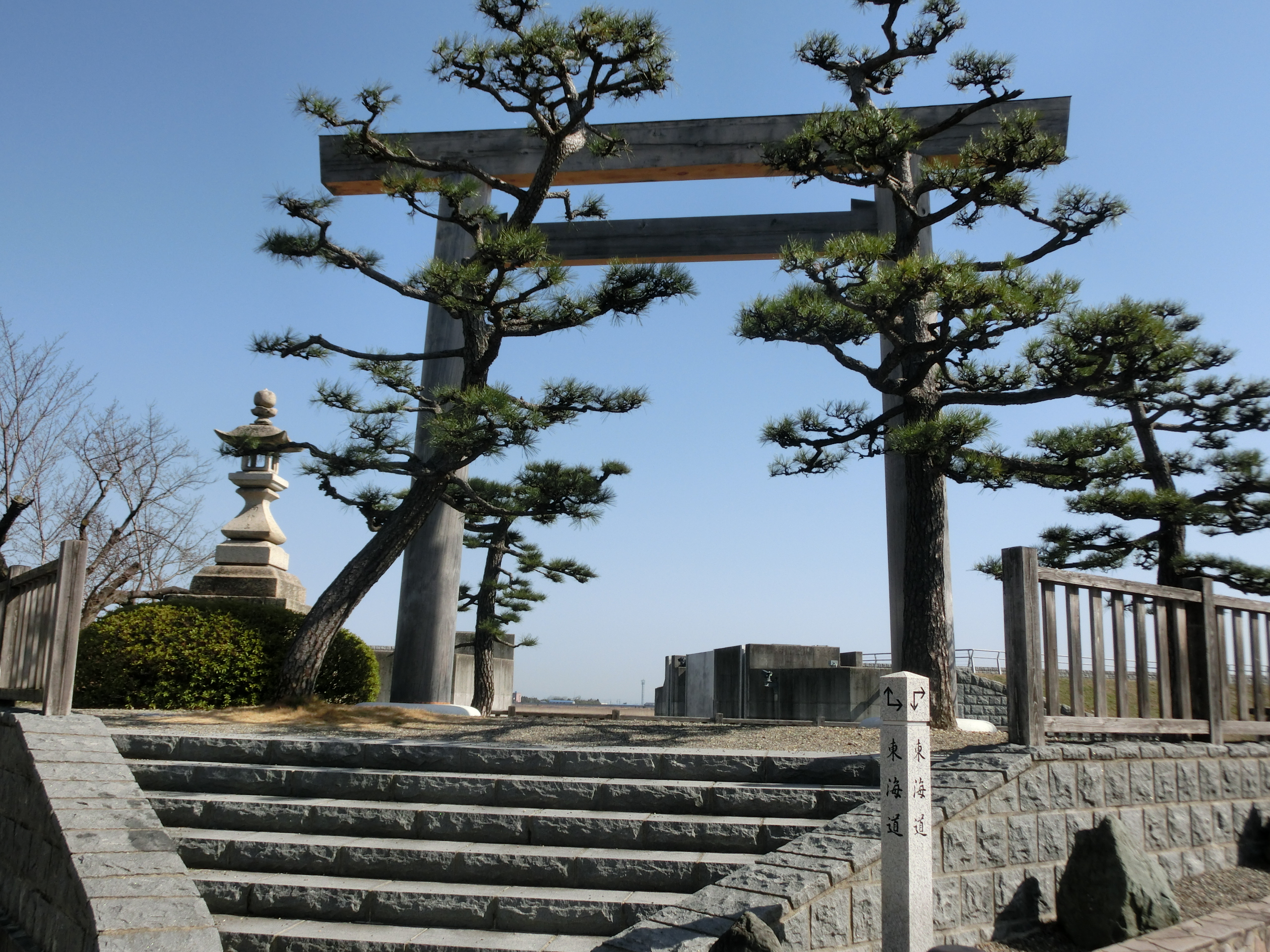
Remains of the Shichiri no watashi ferry

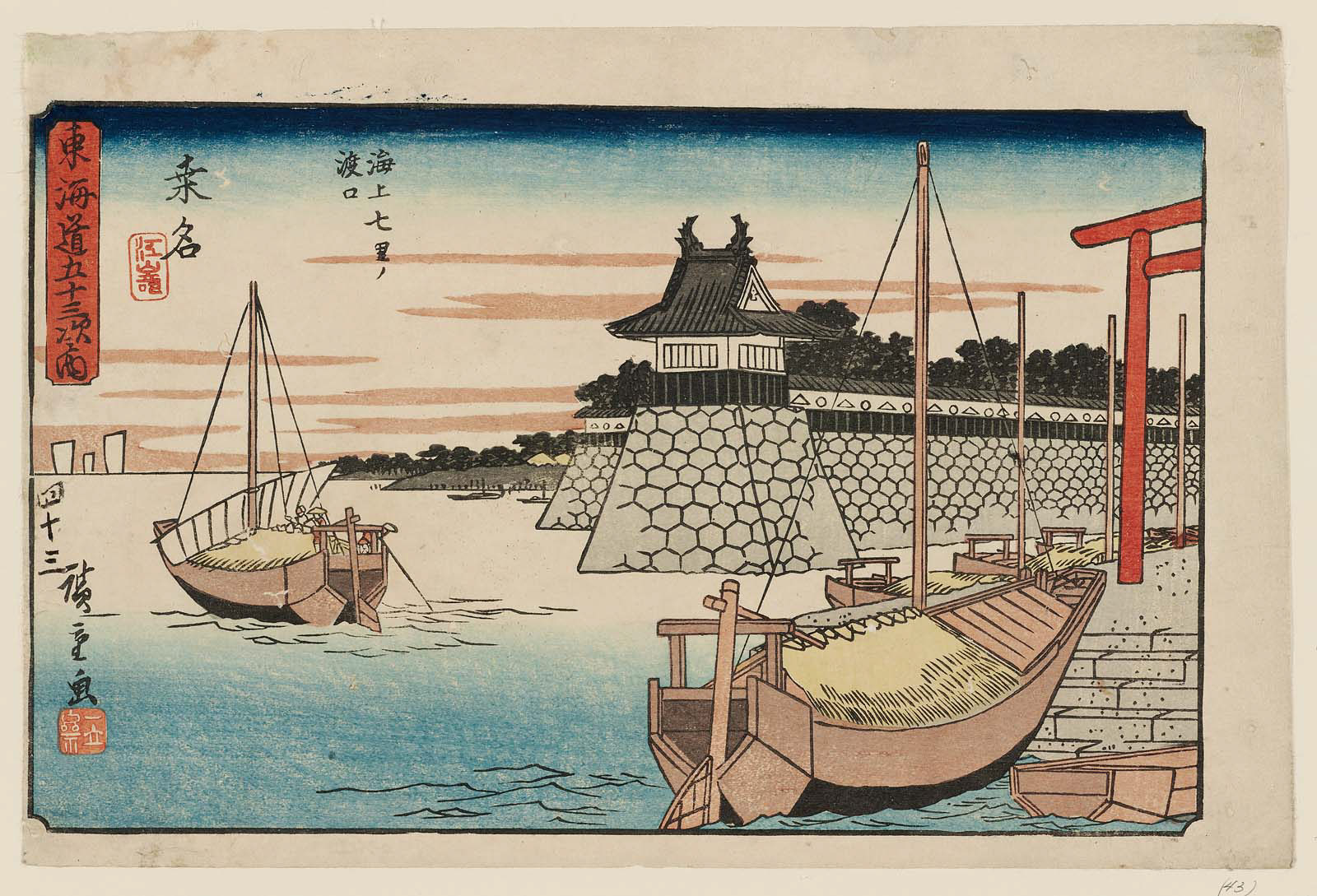
The Landing of the Shichiri Ferry Crossing, from The Fifty-three Stations of the Tōkaidō

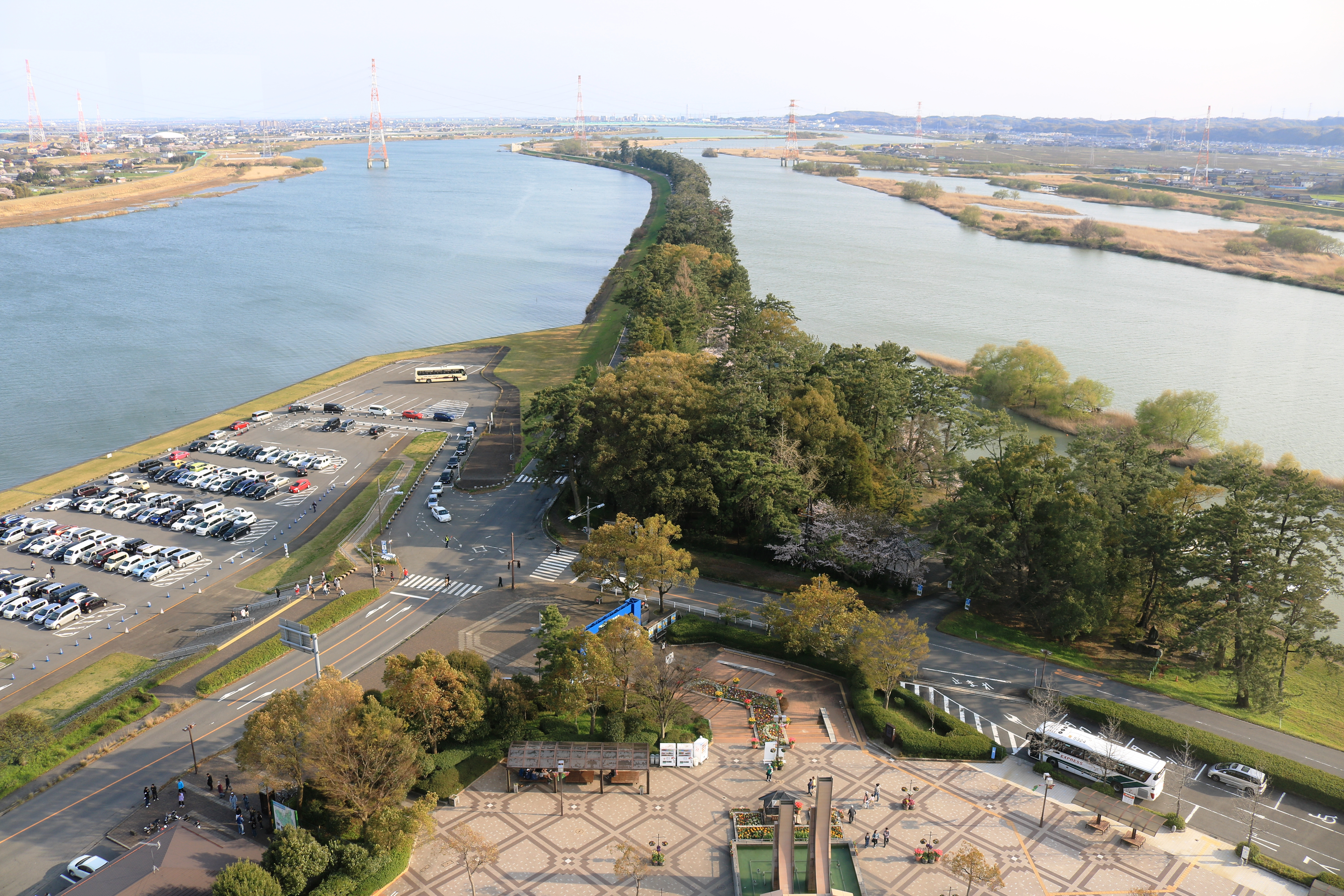
Senbon-matsubara viewed from Kaizu in Gifu Prefecture, with the Nagara River to the left and Ibi River to the right

== See also ==
- National Parks of Japan
- List of Historic Sites of Japan (Mie)
- Tado Shrine
