= Kisosaki =

Kisosaki 木曽岬町
- Town
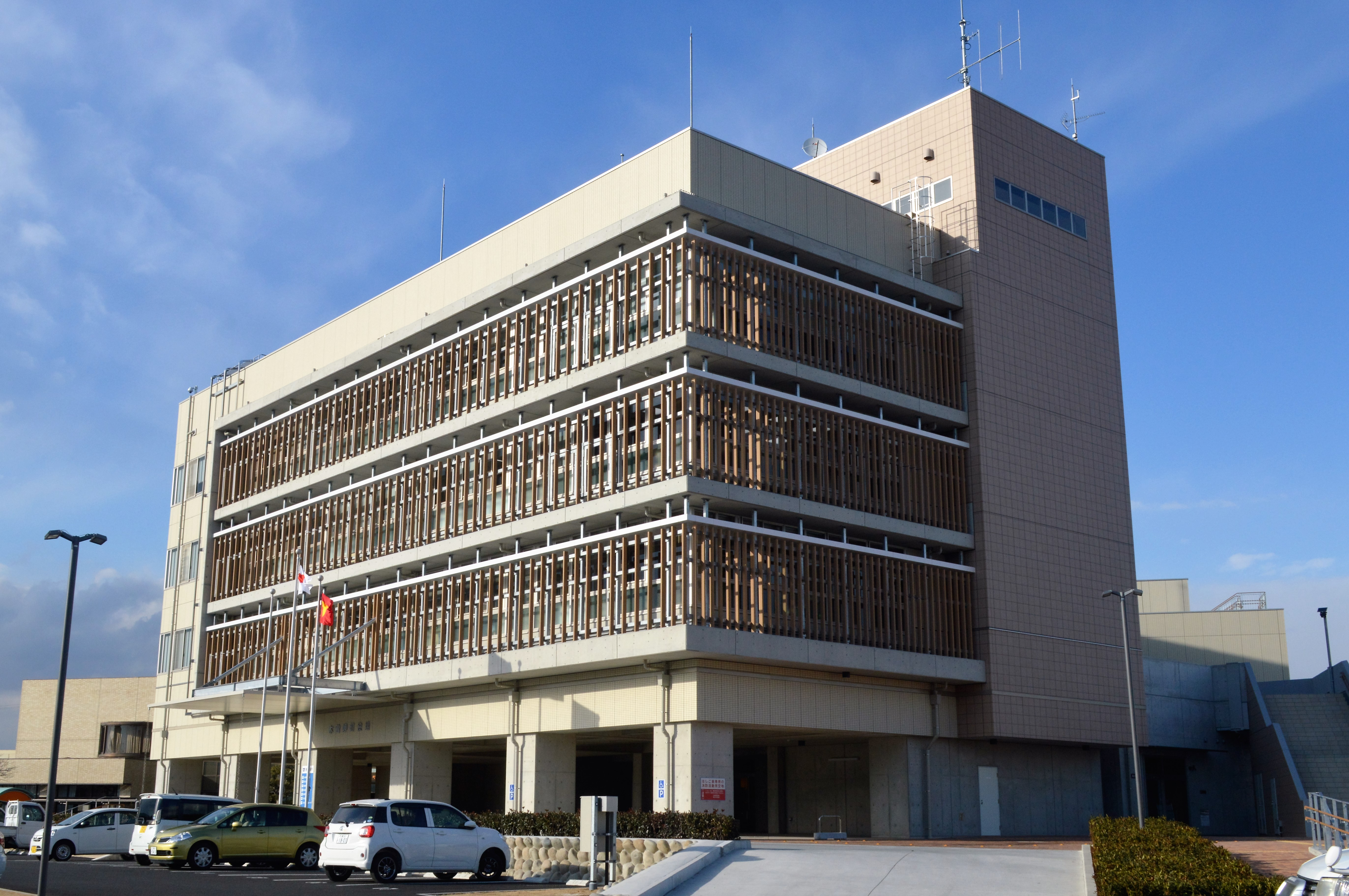
- Kisosaki Town Office

- Flag Seal

- Location of Kisosaki in Mie Prefecture

- Coordinates: 35°5′N 136°44′E
- Country: Japan
- Region: Kansai
- Prefecture: Mie
- District: Kuwana

Area
  - Total: 15.72 km^{2} (6.07 sq mi)

Population (July 2021)
  - Total: 6,134
  - Density: 390.2/km^{2} (1,011/sq mi)
- Time zone: UTC+9 (Japan Standard Time)
- Tree: Sakura
- Flower: Narcissus
- Phone number: 0567-68-6100
- Address: 251 Nishikari kaichi, Kisosaki-chō, Kuwana-gun, Mie-ken 498-8503
- Website: Official website

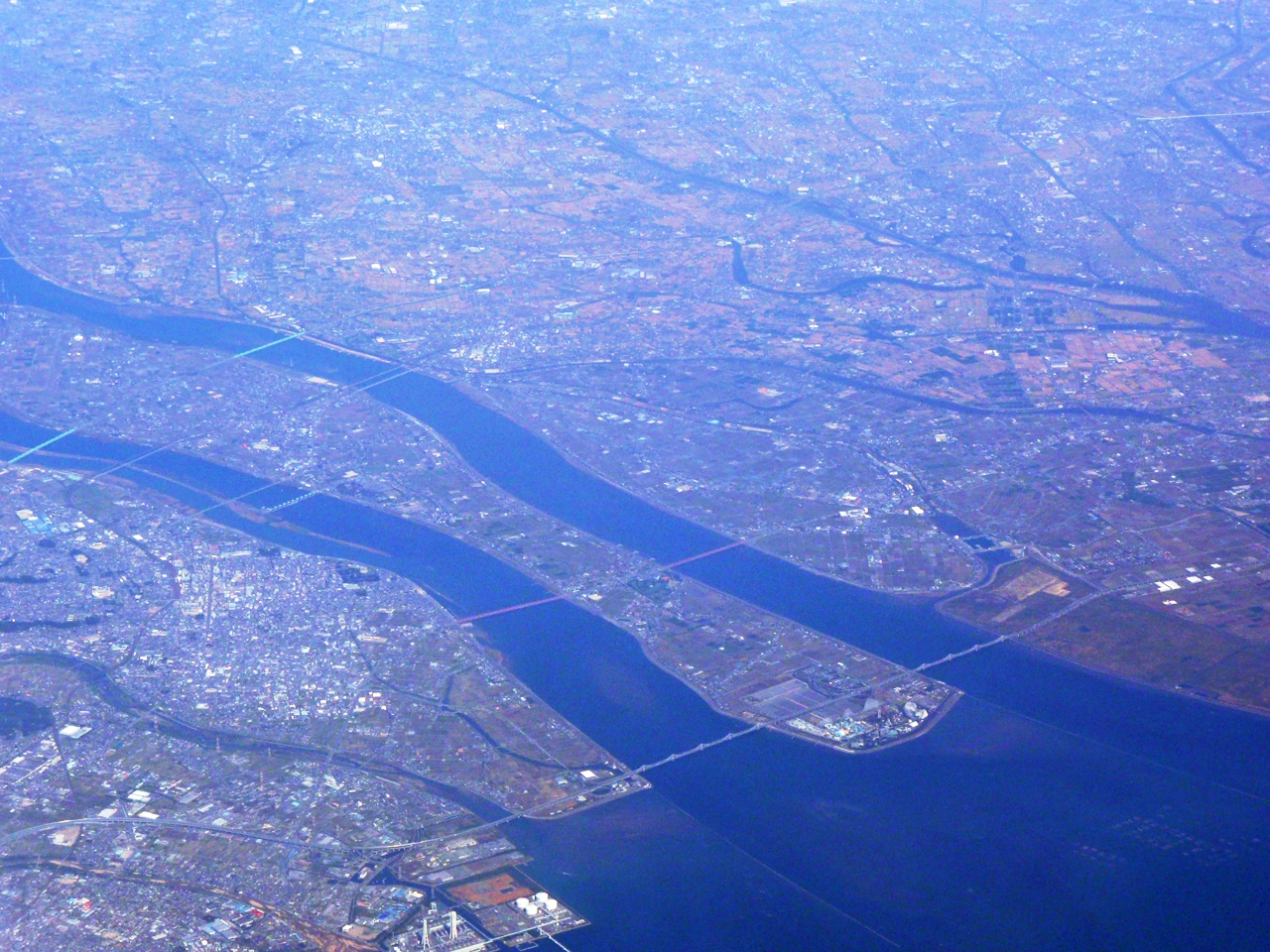
Kisosaki Town

Kisosaki (木曽岬町, Kisosaki-chō) is a town located in Mie Prefecture, Japan. As of 1 July 2021, the town had an estimated population of 6,134 in 2518 households and a population density of 390 persons per km^{2}. The total area of the town was 15.72 square kilometres (6.07 sq mi).

== Geography ==
Kisosaki is located in far northeastern Mie Prefecture on the border with Aichi Prefecture. The town is located on islands formed by the delta of the Kiso Three Rivers as they exit to Ise Bay.

=== Neighboring municipalities ===
Aichi Prefecture

- Yatomi

Mie Prefecture

- Kuwana

== Climate ==
Kisosaki has a humid subtropical climate (Köppen Cfa) characterized by warm summers and cool winters with light to no snowfall. The average annual temperature in Kisosaki is 14.9 °C. The average annual rainfall is 1656 mm with September as the wettest month. The temperatures are highest on average in August, at around 26.6 °C, and lowest in January, at around 3.5 °C.

== Demographics ==
Per Japanese census data, the population of Kisosaki increased rapidly in the 1980s.

Historical population
Year	Pop.	±%
1920	3,023	—
1930	3,004	−0.6%
1940	3,008	+0.1%
1950	3,008	+0.0%
1960	3,439	+14.3%
1970	3,358	−2.4%
1980	4,986	+48.5%
1990	7,167	+43.7%
2000	7,172	+0.1%
2010	6,855	−4.4%

== History ==
The village of Kisosaki was established on April 1, 1889 with the establishment of the modern municipalities system. It was raised to town status in 1989.

== Government ==
Kisosaki has a mayor-council form of government with a directly elected mayor and a unicameral city council of eight members. Kisosaki, collectively with the city of Kuwana, contributes four members to the Mie Prefectural Assembly. In terms of national politics, the town is part of Mie 3rd district of the lower house of the Diet of Japan.

== Economy ==
The local economy is dominated by the growing of tomatoes and by food processing industries.

== Education ==
Kisosaki has one public elementary school and one public middle school operated by the town government. The town does not have a high school.

== Transportation ==
=== Railway ===
Kisosaki is not served by any railways. The nearest station is Yatomi or Kintetsu-Yatomi in the nearby city of Yatomi.

=== Highway ===
- Isewangan Expressway
- National Route 23

== Local attractions ==
- Kiso Three Rivers
- Suigō Prefectural Natural Park
