= Yōrō Falls =

Waterfall in Japan

Coordinates: 35°16′48″N 136°32′03″E

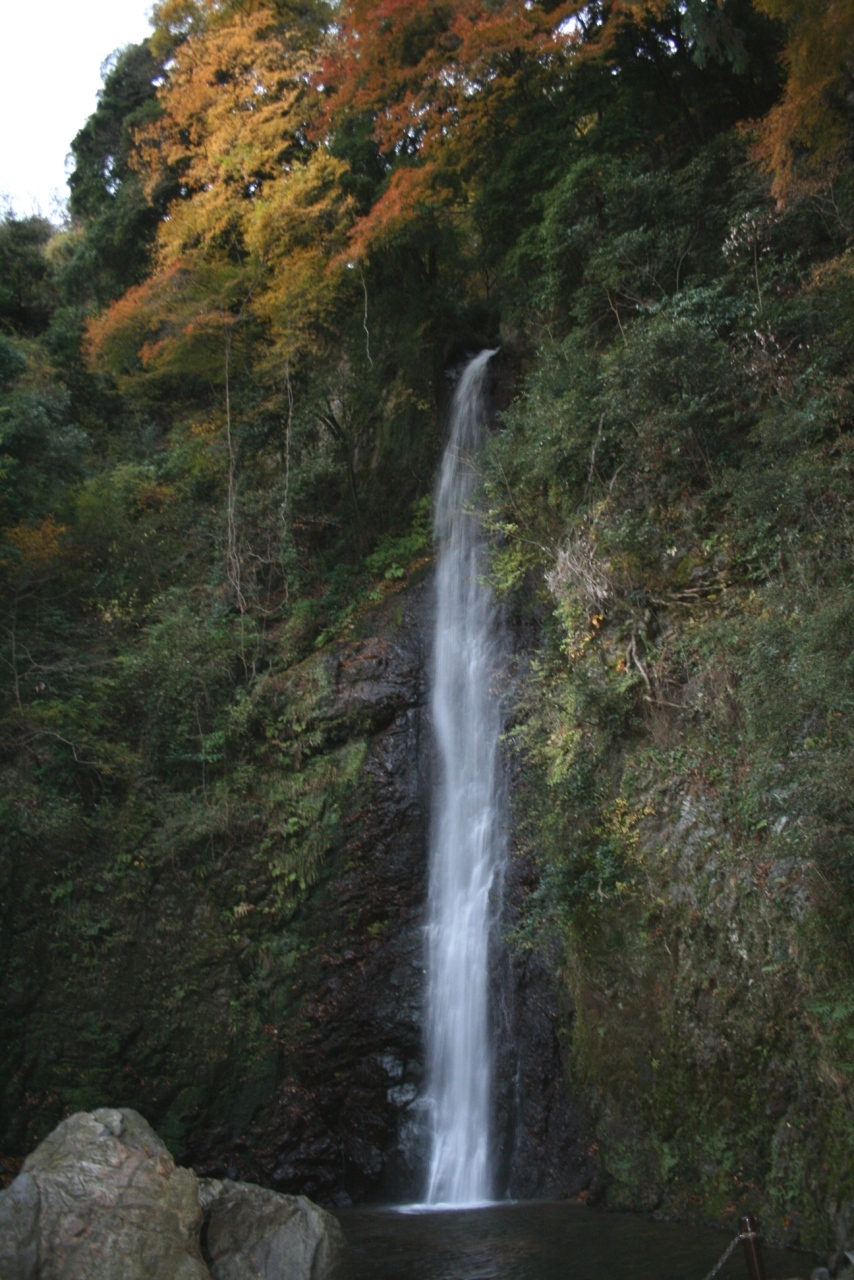
- Yōrō Falls in autumn

- Location within Japan
- Location: Yōrō, Yōrō District, Gifu, Japan
- Total height: 32 m (105 ft)
- Average width: 4 m (13 ft)

Yōrō Falls (養老の滝, Yōrō no Taki) is a waterfall in Yōrō Park located in the town of Yōrō, Yōrō District, Gifu, Japan.

== Summary ==
The waterfall is 32 metres (105 ft) high and 4 metres (13 ft) wide. It was chosen as one of Japan’s Top 100 Waterfalls. The water from the falls is praised for its high quality, and is mentioned in a legend that tells the story of a dedicated son who offered the water, which tasted like sake to his ailing father who, upon drinking it, was revived. The Empress Genshō, who visited this area, renamed the period of her reign "Yōrō" saying, "Rei Springs art beautiful springs. And so doth nourish the old. Perhaps it be the spirit of the waters. I do [hereby] give amnesty under heaven, and fix the third year of the Reiki (era) anew to year 1 of the Yōrō (era)."

Yōrō Park extends from Yōrō Falls to the Nanno Sekigahara Line, a prefectural road that runs along the foot of the mountain. From the park's parking lot, one must climb a steep hillside road for 700 to 800 metres (2,300 to 2,600 ft), but from about midway between the parking lot and the falls, there is a lift running. By taking this lift, one may reach the falls with comparative ease. Also, there is another parking lot nearer the falls. The carbonated beverages like Ramune and cider, which are made using the water, are also popular.

The cider that is made with the local water was once called "Yōrō Cider" and was produced in the town. In recent years, the production of this beverage has been taken over by a different company, and the product renamed "Yōrō Sanroku Cider."

== Geography ==
The waterfall is in the upstream part of the Taki Valley, which joins in Tsuya River (Tributary of Ibi River) then flows Ise Bay. Taki Valley is the source river on Mount Yōrō. Yōrō Station of YORO Railway CO., LTD is the nearest station for the waterfall. It is in the Ibi-Sekigahara-Yōrō Quasi-National Park (List of national parks of Japan). It is near the starting point for climbing Mount Yōrō and Mount Shō. The hiker often visits the waterfall. Also there is the Tōkai Nature Trail in the south soon.

== Gallery ==
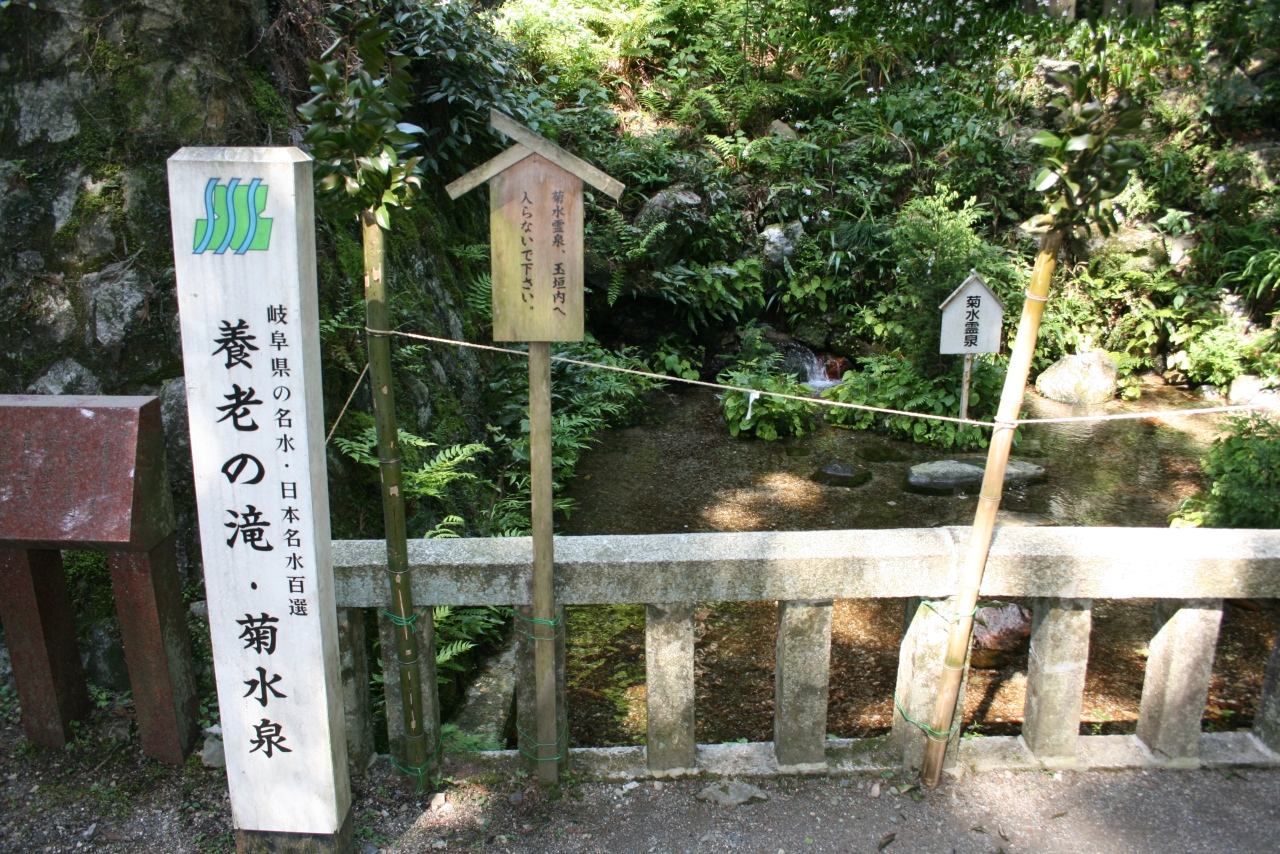
Spring (hydrosphere) of Yōrō Falls, Kikusuisen (菊水泉, Kiku Sui Sen)

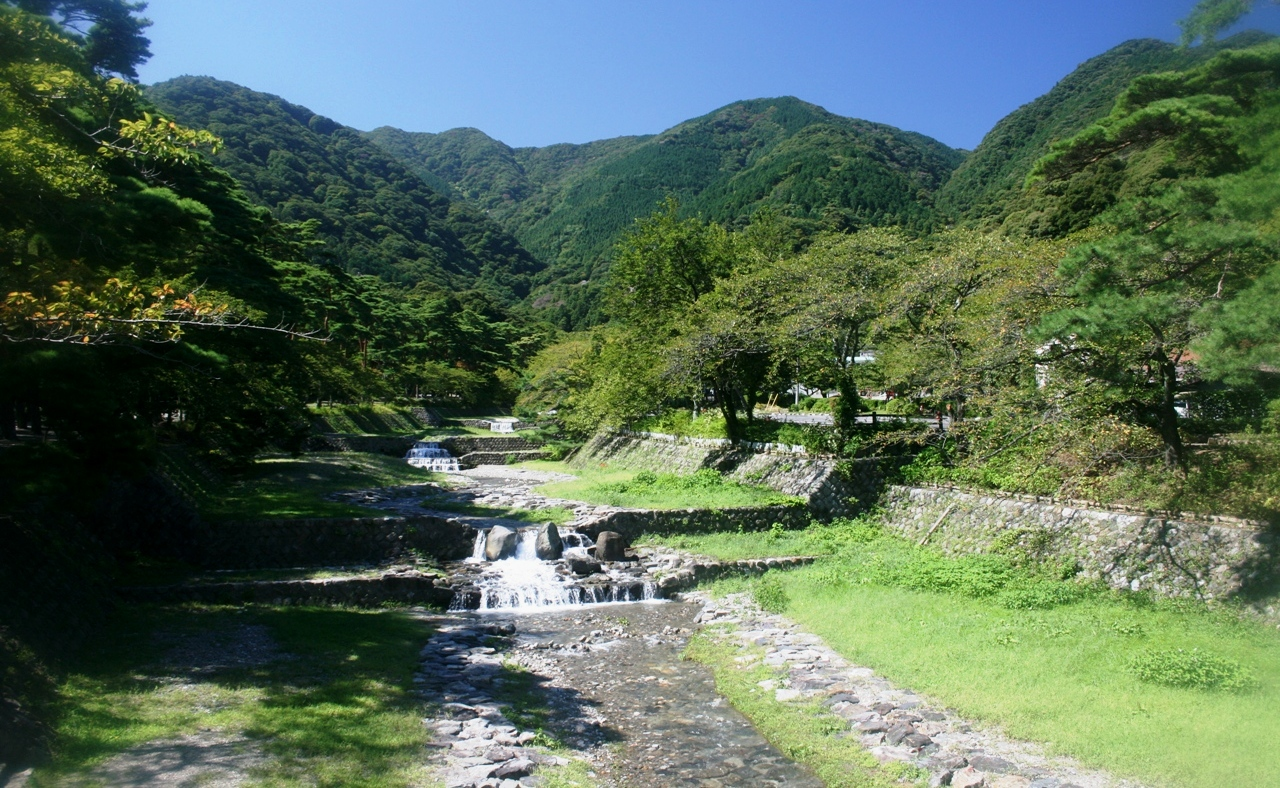
Taki Valley (滝谷, Taki Dani) and Yōrō Park on the downstream part of Yōrō Falls

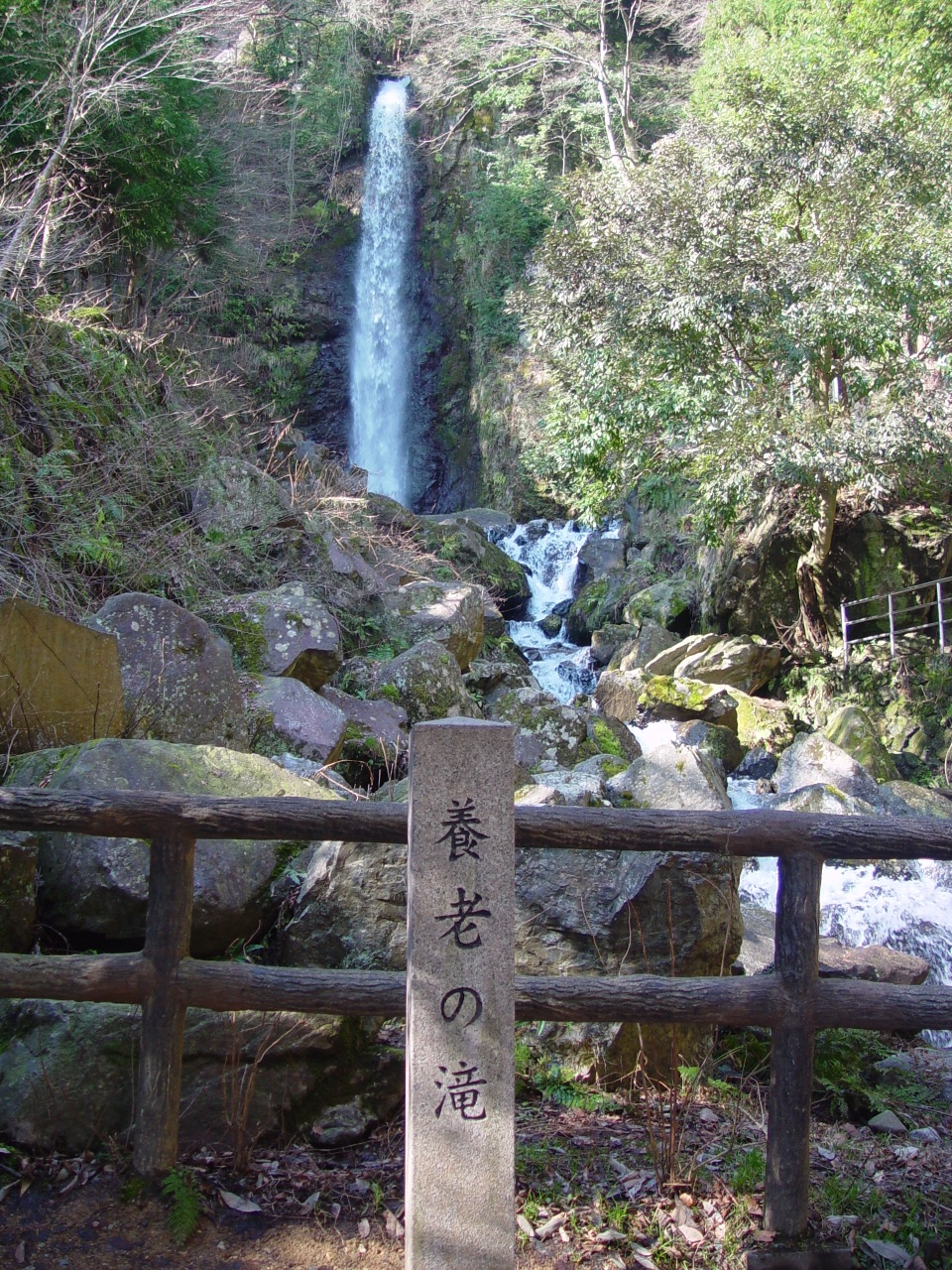
Yōrō Falls

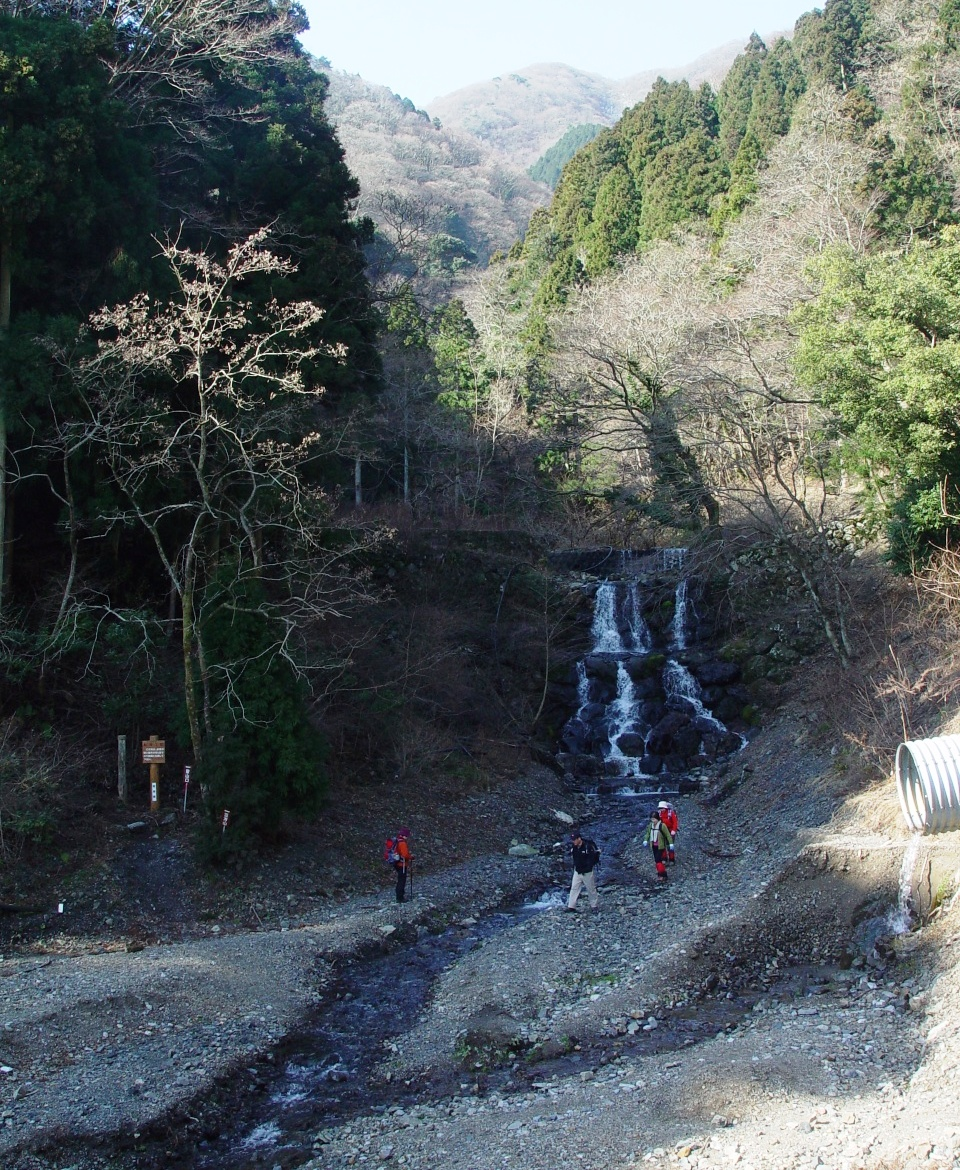
The upstream part of Yōrō Falls, Taki Valley and the trail for Mount Yōrō

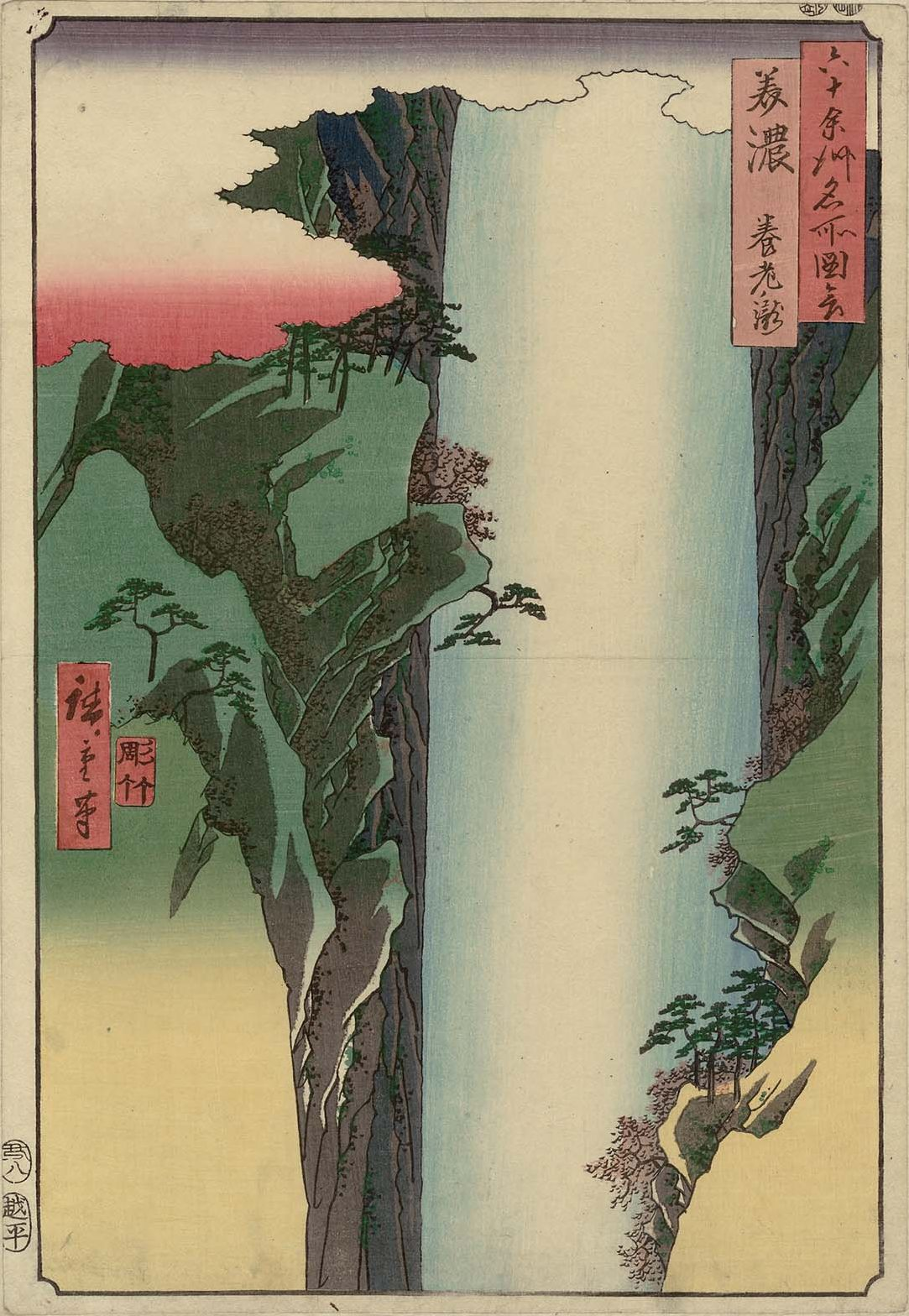
Hiroshige

== See also ==
- List of waterfalls
- Japan’s Top 100 Waterfalls
- Mount Yōrō
- Yōrō Station
- Ibi-Sekigahara-Yōrō Quasi-National Park
- Tōkai Nature Trail
