= Mount Yōrō =

Mountain in Gifu Prefecture, Japan

- 養老山
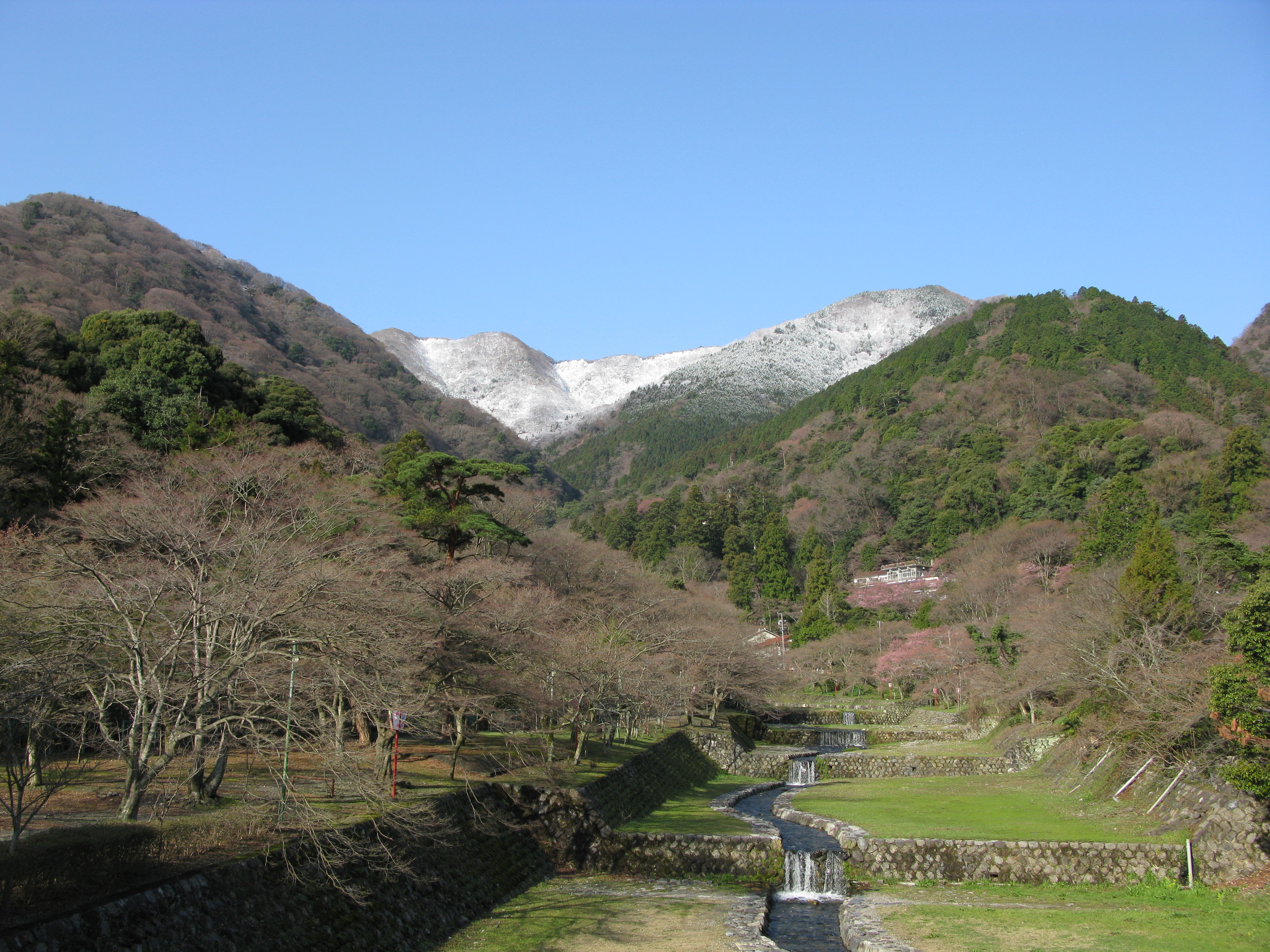
- Mount Yōrō

Highest point
- Elevation: 859.3 m (2,819 ft)
- Coordinates: 35°15′47″N 136°31′24″E

Geography
- Location: Yōrō and Ōgaki; Gifu Prefecture, Japan
- Parent range: Yōrō Mountains
- Topo map(s): Geographical Survey Institute, 25000:1 養老, 50000:1 津島

Climbing
- Easiest route: Yōrō Ropeway

Mount Yōrō (養老山, Yōrō-san) is a mountain located in the cities of Yōrō and Ōgaki, Gifu Prefecture, Japan. Its peak rises 859 m (2,818 ft) and is the main peak in the Yōrō Mountains that stretch through the region. It was previously called Mount Tagi (多芸山 Tagi-yama).

There is a large park with many attractions between the town of Yōrō and the mountain. From the park, there are trails to the Yōrō waterfall and to the summit of the mountain.

== Reaching the summit ==
There are two options for reaching the summit. The easiest way to reach the summit is to take the Yōrō Ropeway from the parking lot above Yōrō Falls. The second option is to hike up the mountain using trails that also begin from the parking lot above Yōrō Falls. There is a record book in which climbers can sign their name to record their journey. The trail to the top is about 4 km (2.5 mi) long.

== Access ==
The town of Yōrō is on the Kintetsu Yōrō Line. It can be reached from Ōgaki in the north, or from Kuwana in the south. Ōgaki is on the JR Tōkaidō Main Line.

== Gallery ==
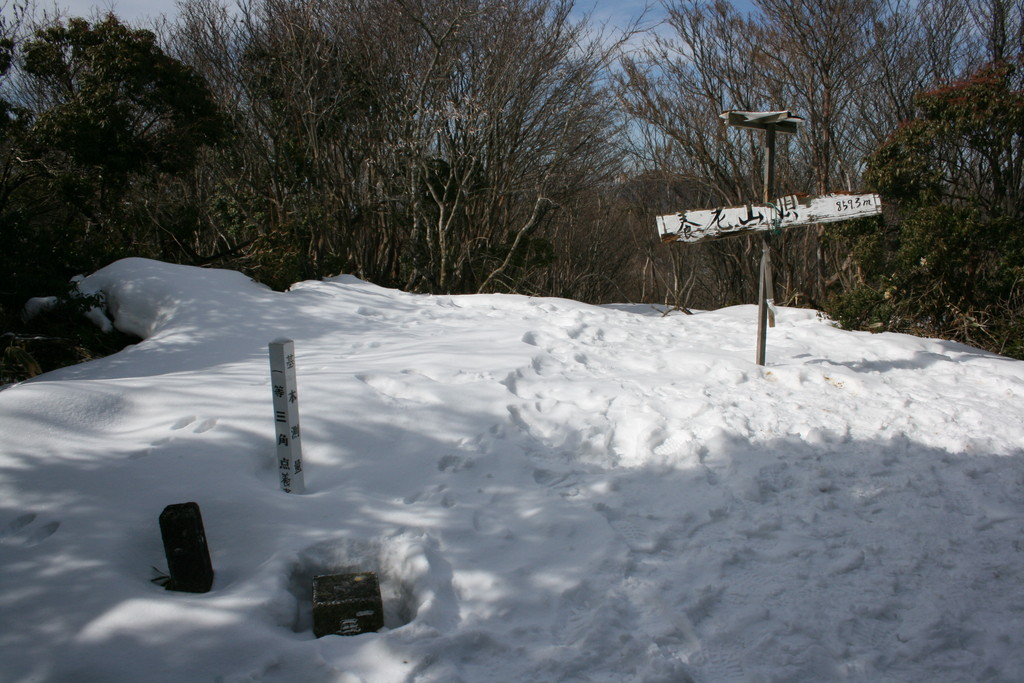
Top and Triangulation station in winter

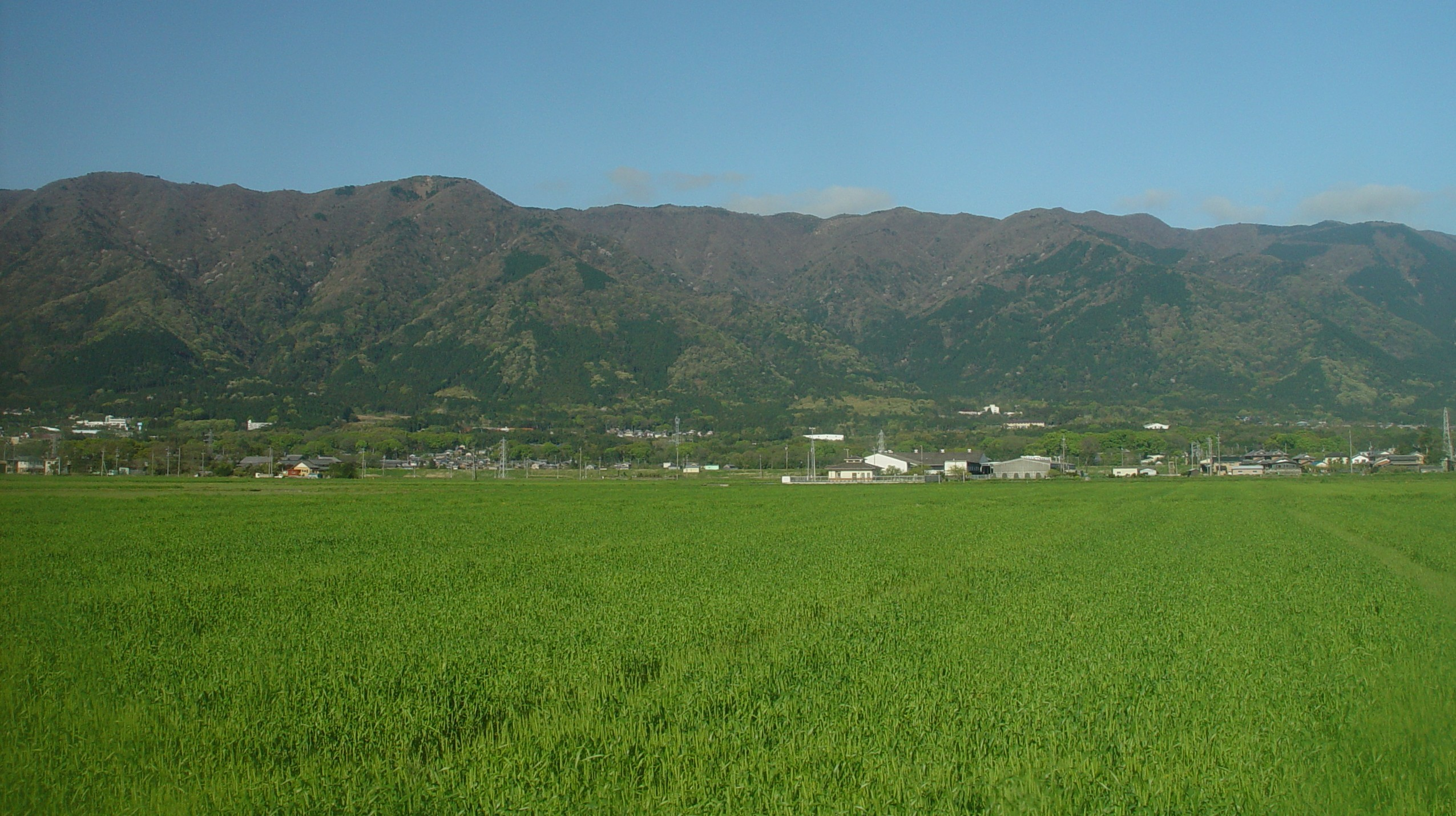
Mount Yōrō from the foot Yōrō, Gifu

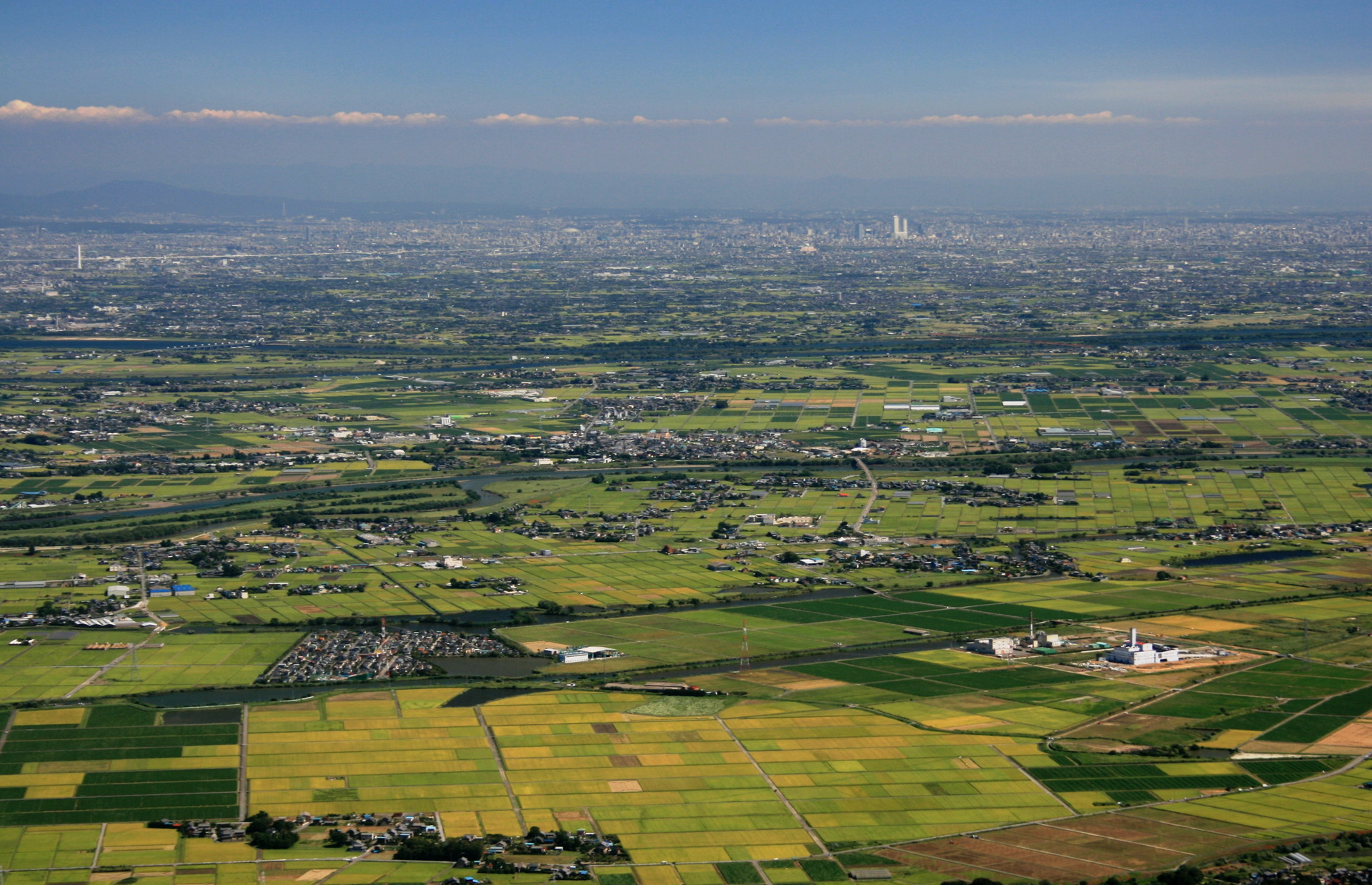
Nōbi Plain and Nagoya from Yōrō Mountains

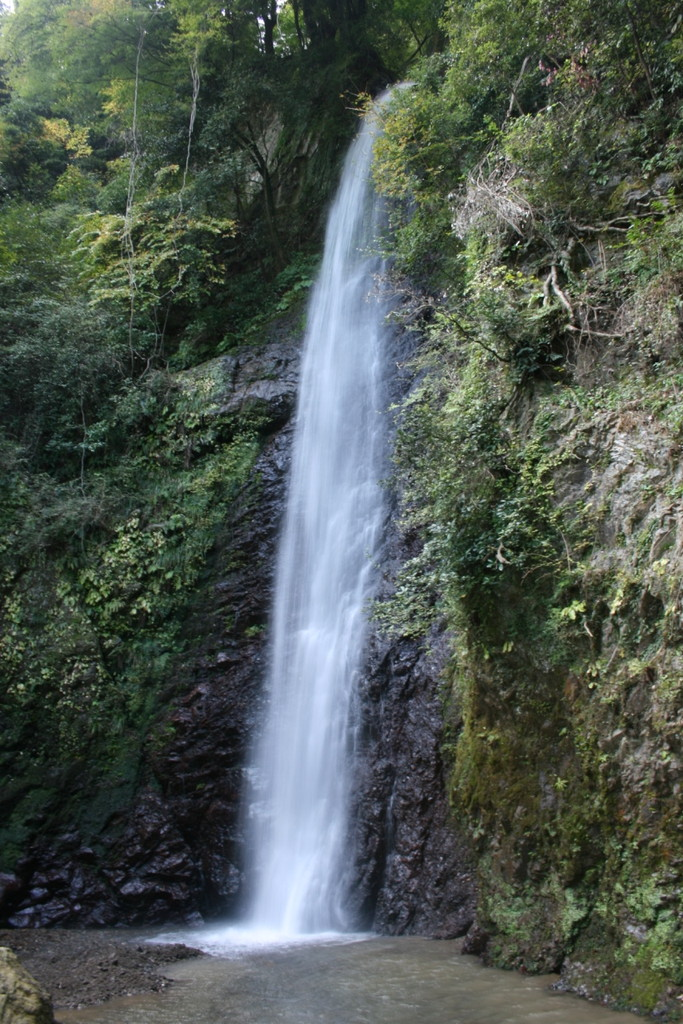
Yōrō Waterfall at entrance in the hiking trail

== See also ==
- Yōrō Mountains
- Yōrō Waterfall
- Yōrō, Gifu
