= Yōrō Mountains =

Mountain range in Japan

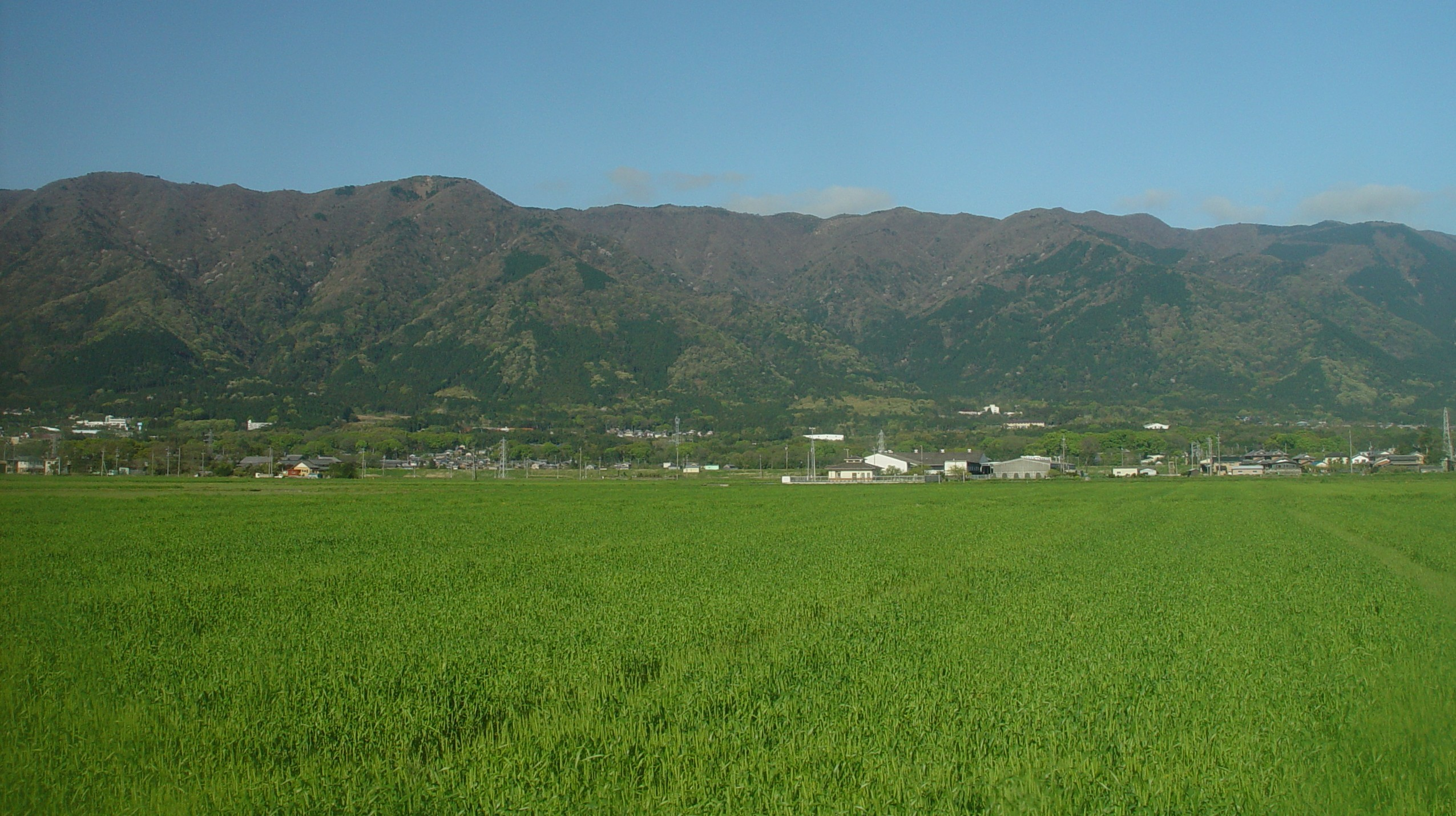
- Mount Yōrō from the foot in mountain; Yoro town

Highest point
- Peak: Shōgatake
- Elevation: 908.3 m (2,980 ft)
- Coordinates: 35°17′01″N 136°30′40.3″E

Dimensions
- Length: 25 km (16 mi)
- Width: 10 km (6.2 mi)

Naming
- Native name: 養老山地 (Japanese)

Geography
- Location within Japan
- Location: Honshu
- Country: Japan
- Prefectures: Mie and Gifu

The Yōrō Mountains (養老山地, Yōrō Sanchi) are a mountain range straddling the border between Gifu and Mie prefectures in Japan. They form part of the western border of the Nōbi Plain.

== Geography ==
The Yōrō Mountains are approximately 10 km (6 mi) wide and 25 km (16 mi) long, running primarily from south-southwest to north-northeast. The northern section's highest peaks reach 900 m (2,953 ft), and the southern section's reach 400 m (1,312 ft). The group's tallest point is Mount Shō (笙ヶ岳 Shō-ga-dake), but the main peaks are Mount Yōrō in the north and Mount Tado (多度山 Tado-yama) in the south.

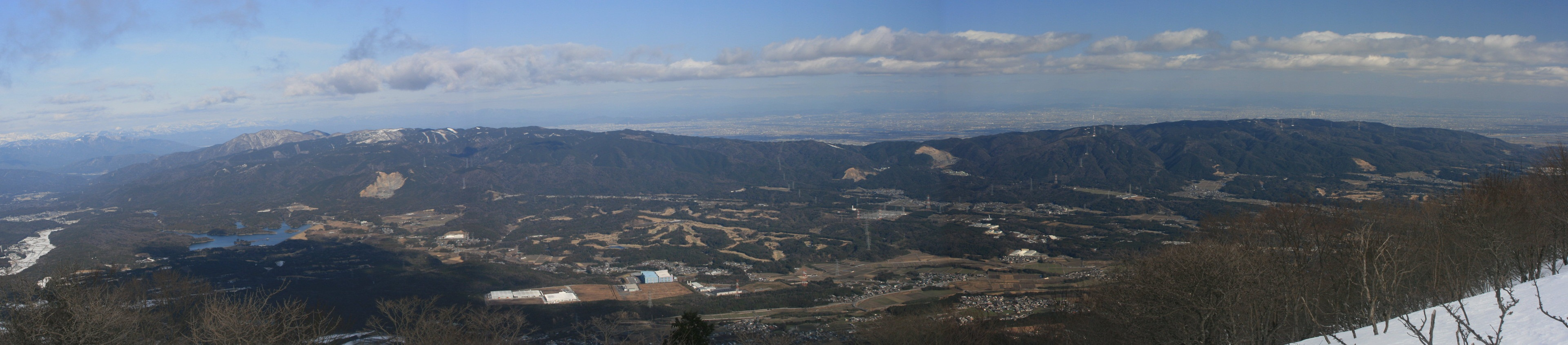
Yōrō Mountains from Mount Fujiwara of Suzuka Mountains

== Flora and fauna ==
A variety of beech and oak trees covers the Yōrō Mountains. The Japanese government has declared Mount Shō a natural monument for its diverse plant life.

Major mammals on the mountains include the Japanese macaque and sika deer.

== Places of interest ==
On the Yōrō Line, between Mino-Yamazaki Station and Komano Station, on the side of Mt. Garyou, a Buddhist temple was built by Gyōki in 744 AD. It was originally called Temple of the Bodhisattva of Mt. Garyou. It was burned down in 1336 during a war. In 1705 it was rebuilt by the Matsudaira nobility as their private temple and renamed Gyōkiji (Gyōki's Temple).

Near Yōrō town, on the side of Mount Yōrō, is the Yōrō waterfall and a large park with two special areas for children. There is also a hiking path to the top of the mountain.

Tado Shrine is near the town of Tado. There are hiking paths to the top of Mount Tado, which is 403 meters.

== See also ==
- Mount Yōrō
- Geography of Japan
