= List of historic sites of Japan (Gifu) =

This list contains historic sites of Japan located within the prefecture of Gifu.

== National Historic Sites ==
As of 3 January 2026, thirty-three Sites have been designated as being of national significance; the Nakasendō spans the prefectural borders with Nagano.

Site	Municipality	Comments	Image	Coordinates	Type	Ref.
Otozuka Kofun - Danjirimaki Kofun 乙塚古墳 附 段尻巻古墳 Otozuka kofun tsuketari Danjirimaki kofun	Toki	Kofun period tumuli	Otozuka kofun tsuketari Danjirimaki kofun	35°21′56″N 137°10′51″E	1	1270
Kanō Castle ruins 加納城跡 Kanō-jō ato	Gifu	Edo period castle ruins	Kanō Castle ruins	35°23′58″N 136°45′38″E	2	1292
Sekigahara Battlefield 関ヶ原古戦場 Sekigahara ko-senjō	Sekigahara	Sengoku period battlefield; designation includes the sites of the initial position of Tokugawa Ieyasu (徳川家康最初陣地), final position of Tokugawa Ieyasu (徳川家康最後陣地), position of Ishida Mitsunari (石田三成陣地), Okayama beacon (岡山烽火場), grave of Ōtani Yoshitsugu (大谷吉隆墓), east kubizuka (東首塚), and west kubizuka (西首塚)	Sekigahara Battlefield	35°21′39″N 136°27′54″E	2, 7	1260
Gifu Castle 岐阜城跡 Gifu-jō ato	Gifu	Sengoku period castle ruins	Gifu Castle	35°26′02″N 136°46′55″E	2	00003701
Kotozuka Kofun 琴塚古墳 Kotozuka Kofun	Gifu	Kofun period tumulus	Kotozuka Kofun	35°25′05″N 136°48′52″E	1	1267
Motoyashiki Pottery Kiln Site 元屋敷陶器窯跡 Motoyashiki tōki kama ato	Toki	Sengoku period kiln ruins	Motoyashiki Pottery Kiln Site	35°21′56″N 137°10′34″E	6	1282
Ema clan castle ruins 江馬氏城館跡 Ema-shi jōkan ato	Hida	Sengoku period castle ruins; designation includes Shimodate residence (下館跡), Takaharasuwa Castle (高原諏訪城跡), Tsuchi Castle (土城跡), Terabayashi Castle (寺林城跡), Masamoto Castle (政元城跡), Hora Castle (洞城跡), and Ishigami Castle (石神城跡)	Ema clan castle sites	36°24′23″N 137°17′58″E	2	1289
Takayama Jin'ya 高山陣屋跡 Takayama Jin'ya	Takayama	Edo period jin'ya	Takayama Jin'ya	36°08′23″N 137°15′27″E	2	1256
Tarui Ichirizuka 垂井一里塚 Tarui Ichirizuka	Tarui	Edo period milestone	Tarui Ichirizuka	35°22′14″N 136°30′42″E	6	1258
Shōge temple ruins 正家廃寺跡 Shōge Haiji ato	Ena	Hakuhō to Nara period temple ruins	Shōge temple ruins	35°26′19″N 137°25′01″E	3	3301
Nishitakagike Jin'ya ruins 西高木家陣屋跡 Nishitakagike jin'ya ato	Ōgaki	Edo period jin'ya	Takayama Jin'ya	35°21′34″N 136°36′46″E	3, 7	00003859
Akahogi Tile Kiln Site ruins 赤保木瓦窯跡 Akahogi kawara kama ato	Takayama	Nara to Heian period kiln ruins	Akahogi Tile Kiln ruins	36°09′39″N 137°13′11″E	6	1286
Hiruiōzuka Kofun 昼飯大塚古墳 Hiruiōzuka Kofun	Ōgaki	Kofun period tumulus	Hiruiōzuka Kofun	35°23′14″N 136°34′17″E	1	3262
Nagatsuka Kofun 長塚古墳 Nagatsuka Kofun	Kani	Kofun period tumulus	Nagatsuka Kofun	35°25′52″N 137°04′07″E	1	1277
Dōnosora Site 堂之上遺跡 Dōnosora iseki	Takayama	Jōmon period settlement trace	Dōnosora ruins	36°03′13″N 137°16′47″E	1	1290
Hida Kokubun-ji Pagoda ruins 飛騨国分寺塔跡 Hida Kokubunji tō ato	Takayama	Nara period temple ruins	Hida Kokubun-ji Pagoda ruins	36°08′36″N 137°15′14″E	3	1255
Kaneyama Castle ruins 美濃金山城跡 Mino Kaneyama-jō ato	Kani	Sengoku period castle ruins	Mino Kaneyama Castle ruins	35°30′47″N 137°29′07″E	2	00003817
Mino Provincial Capital ruins 美濃国府跡 Mino Kokufu ato	Tarui	Nara-Heian period kokufu ruins	Mino Provincial Capital ruins	35°27′25″N 137°05′51″E	2	00003469
Mino Kokubun-ji ruins 美濃国分寺跡 Mino Kokufu ato	Ōgaki	Nara-Heian period temple ruins	Mino Kokubun-ji ruins	35°23′05″N 136°33′05″E	3	1238
Naegi Castle ruins 苗木城跡 Naegi-jō ato	Nakatsugawa	Sengoku-Edo period castle ruins	Naegi Castle ruins	35°30′47″N 137°29′07″E	2	1291
No Kofun Cluster 野古墳群 No kofun-gun	Nakatsugawa	Kofun period tumuli	No Kofun Cluster	35°28′48″N 136°37′21″E	2, 3, 6	1279
Mirokuji kanga ruins 弥勒寺官衙遺跡群 Mirokuji kanga iseki-gun	Seki, Mino	Nara-Heian period administrative center; designation includes the Mirokuji Kanga ruins (弥勒寺官衙遺跡), Miroku-ji ruins (弥勒寺跡), and Maruyama Old Kiln (丸山古窯跡)	Mirokuji kanga ruins	35°30′21″N 136°53′33″E	2, 3, 6	1279
Aburajima Senbonmatsu Embankment 油島千本松締切堤 Aburajima Senbonmatsu shimekiri tsutsumi	Kaizu	Edo period civil engineering	Aburajima Senbonmatsu embankment	35°08′17″N 136°40′08″E	6	1271
Oibora-Asakura Sue Ware Kiln Site 老洞・朝倉須恵器窯跡 Oibora-Asakura sueki kama ato	Gifu	Nara period kiln ruins	Oibora-Asakura Sue Ware Kiln ruins	35°26′43″N 136°50′55″E	6	1288
Nakasendō 中山道 Nakasendō	Nakatsugawa, Mitake	ancient highway	Nakasendō	35°30′55″N 137°33′00″E	6	1203
Higashi-Chōda Kofun 東町田墳墓群 Higashi-Chōda funbo-gun	Ōgaki	Kofun period tumulus	Higashi-Chōda Kofun	35°22′49″N 136°34′10″E	7	00003967
Funakiyama Kofun cluster 船来山古墳群 Funakiyama kofun-gun	Motosu	Kofun period tumuli	Funakiyama Kofun Cluster	35°28′30″N 136°40′59″E	1	00004060
Yūda Tumuli 夕田墳墓群 Yūda funbo-gun	Tomika		Yūda Tumuli	35°29′03″N 136°59′45″E	1	00004163
Anekōji Clan Castle Sites 姉小路氏城跡 Anekōji-shi shiro ato	Hida	designation includes the sites of Furukawa Castle (古川城跡), Kojima Castle (小島城跡), Noguchi Castle (野口城跡), Mukaikojima Castle (向小島城跡) & Kotokari Castle (小鷹利城跡)		36°13′23″N 137°10′56″E	2	00004186
Matsukura Castle Site 松倉城跡 Matsukura-jō ato	Takayama		Matsukura Castle Site	36°07′36″N 137°14′00″E	2	00004218
Bōnotsuka Kofun 坊の塚古墳; Bōnotsuka kofun	Kakamigahara			35°24′11″N 136°55′32″E		
Tō Clan Residence Site - Shinowaki Castle Site 東氏館跡及び篠脇城跡; Tō-shi yakata ato oyobi Shinowaki-jō ato	Gujō			35°48′28″N 136°55′33″E		
Ōga Castle Site 大桑城跡; Ōga-jō ato	Yamagata			35°33′47″N 136°46′08″E		

== Prefectural Historic Sites ==
As of 28 May 2025, one hundred and forty-eight Sites have been designated as being of prefectural importance.

Site	Municipality	Comments	Image	Coordinates	Type	Ref.
Atsumi-ji Site 厚見寺跡; Atsumiji ato	Gifu	in the precinct of Zuiryū-ji		35°25′09″N 136°46′00″E		
Shishi-an 獅子庵; Shishi-an	Gifu			35°30′33″N 136°50′23″E		
Chitsū Kōkyo Grave 智通光居墓; Chitsū Kōkyo no haka	Gifu	at Ryūshō-ji (立政寺)		35°24′27″N 136°43′19″E		
Toki Nariyori Grave 土岐成頼墓; Toki Nariyori no haka	Gifu	at Zuiryū-ji		35°25′09″N 136°46′00″E		
Saitō Myōchin Grave 斎藤妙椿墓; Saitō Myōchin no haka	Gifu	at Zuiryū-ji		35°25′09″N 136°46′00″E		
Gokei Kokushi Grave 悟渓国師墓; Gokei Kokushi no haka	Gifu	at Zuiryū-ji		35°25′09″N 136°46′00″E		
Hōreki Flood Control Works Superintendent Grave 宝暦治水工事義歿者墓; Hōreki chisui kōji gibotsusha no haka	Gifu	at Reishō-in (霊松院)		35°28′12″N 136°46′52″E		
Yagami Castle Site 八神城跡; Yagami-jō ato	Hashima			35°16′04″N 136°41′34″E		
Kaganoi Castle Site 加賀野井城跡; Kaganoi-jō ato	Hashima			35°17′34″N 136°43′00″E		
Sakichi Buddha 佐吉仏; Sakichi Butsu	Hashima			35°19′16″N 136°42′05″E		
Okoshi Ferry Stone Lighthouse 起渡船場石燈台; Okoshi tosenba-seki tōdai	Hashima			35°18′52″N 136°43′48″E		
Nagata Sakichi Grave 永田佐吉墓; Nagata Sakichi no haka	Hashima	at Daibutsu-ji (大佛寺)		35°19′35″N 136°42′10″E		
Yagami Mōri Graves 八神毛利歴代の墓; Yagami Mōri rekidai no haka	Hashima	at Kinpō-ji (金宝寺)		35°16′08″N 136°41′21″E		
Honourable Satsuma Construction Workers' Graves at Egira Seikō-ji 江吉良清江寺薩摩工事義歿者墓; Egira Seikōji Satsuma kōji kibotsusha no haka	Hashima			35°18′59″N 136°41′42″E		
Honourable Satsuma Construction Workers' Graves at Takegahana Ōtani Betsuin 竹ヶ鼻大谷別院薩摩工事義歿者墓; Takegahana Ōtani Betsuin Satsuma kōji kibotsusha no haka	Hashima			35°19′N 136°43′E		
Honourable Satsuma Construction Workers' Graves at Takehana Shōrin-ji 竹鼻少林寺薩摩工事義歿者墓; Takehana Shōrinji Satsuma kōji kibotsusha no haka	Hashima			35°19′23″N 136°42′33″E		
Robata Site 炉畑遺跡; Robata iseki	Kakamigahara			35°23′40″N 136°53′42″E		
Ishōzuka Kofun 衣裳塚古墳; Ishōzuka kofun	Kakamigahara			35°24′18″N 136°55′45″E		
Karayama Kofun 柄山古墳; Karayama kofun	Kakamigahara			35°25′06″N 136°49′24″E		
Motosanden-ji Site and Foundation Stones 元山田寺跡及び礎石; Motosandenji ato oyobi soseki	Kakamigahara			35°24′56″N 136°51′47″E		
Toki Yorimasu and Saitō Toshinaga Graves 土岐頼益・斎藤利永の墓; Toki Yorimasu・Saitō Toshinaga no haka	Kakamigahara	at Daian-ji (大安寺)		35°24′51″N 136°56′06″E		
Tōyō Eichō Zenshi Burial Tō 東陽英朝禅師塔所; Tōyō Eichō Zenshi tassho	Kakamigahara	at Shōrin-ji (少林寺)		35°23′52″N 136°49′16″E		
Sōkei Ōtsuka Kofun 宗慶大塚古墳; Sōkei Ōtsuka kofun	Motosu			35°25′48″N 136°40′01″E		
Kiso River Kasamatsu Ferry Site Cobblestones 木曽川笠松渡船場跡「石畳」 Kiso-gawa Kasamatsu tosenba ato "ishidatami"	Kasamatsu			35°21′51″N 136°45′44″E		
Kitagata Castle Site 北方城跡; Kitagata-jō ato	Kitagata			35°26′14″N 136°41′30″E		
Andō Morinari Death Site 安東伊賀守守就戦死の地; Andō Iganokami Morinari senshi no chi	Kitagata			35°26′21″N 136°41′05″E		
Mino School Haikai Stelai and Minakami Dōjō Site 美濃派俳諧水上道場跡美濃派俳諧句碑; Mino-ha haikai Minakami dōjō ato Mino-ha haikai kuhi	Kitagata	at Saiun-ji (西運寺)		35°26′14″N 136°41′20″E		
Jōri Site 条里跡; Jōri ato	Kitagata			35°25′02″N 136°41′17″E		
Shōenji Sutra Mound 正円寺経塚; Shōenji kyōzuka	Ōgaki			35°21′24″N 136°35′38″E		
Kannonji Sutra Mound 観音寺経塚; Kannonji kyōzuka	Ōgaki			35°23′29″N 136°34′49″E		
Ochaya Yashiki Site お茶屋屋敷跡; Ochaya yashiki ato	Ōgaki			35°23′19″N 136°34′47″E		
Sumiyoshi Lighthouse 住吉燈台; Sumiyoshi tōdai	Ōgaki			35°21′22″N 136°36′46″E		
Toda Family Mausoleum 戸田家廟所; Toda-ke byōsho	Ōgaki	at Entsū-ji (円通寺)		35°21′45″N 136°36′42″E		
Heirinsō Site 平林荘跡; Heirinsō ato	Ōgaki			35°21′51″N 136°34′13″E		
Hazawa Shell Mound 羽沢貝塚; Hazawa kaizuka	Kaizu			35°13′05″N 136°36′26″E		
Niwada Shell Mound 庭田貝塚; Niwada kaizuka	Kaizu			35°13′52″N 136°35′29″E		
Shundai Imao Kiln Site 春岱今尾窯跡; Shundai Imao kama ato	Kaizu			35°14′42″N 136°37′16″E		
Takasu Domain Daimyō Graves 高須藩主歴代墓; Takasu-han-shu rekidai no haka	Kaizu	at Gyōki-ji (行基寺)		35°12′20″N 136°36′28″E		
Honourable Satsuma Construction Workers' Graves at Ishizu 石津薩摩工事義歿者墓; Ishizu Satsuma kōji kibotsusha no haka	Kaizu	at Enjō-ji (円成寺)		35°10′52″N 136°37′45″E		
Honourable Satsuma Construction Workers' Graves at Imao Jōei-ji 今尾常榮寺薩摩工事義歿者墓; Imao Jōeiji Satsuma kōji kibotsusha no haka	Kaizu	at Jōei-ji (常榮寺)		35°14′56″N 136°37′33″E		
Zōbisan Kofun Cluster 象鼻山古墳群; Zōbisan kofun-gun	Yōrō			35°19′42″N 136°32′16″E		
Kashiwao Haiji Site 柏尾廃寺跡; Kashiwao Haiji ato	Yōrō			35°17′42″N 136°32′25″E		
Honourable Satsuma Construction Workers' Graves at Nekoji 根古地薩摩工事義歿者墓; Nekoji Satsuma kōji kibotsusha no haka	Yōrō	at Jōei-ji (常榮寺)		35°16′02″N 136°36′15″E		
Honourable Satsuma Construction Workers' Graves at Tenshō-ji 天照寺薩摩工事義歿者墓; Tenshōji Satsuma kōji kibotsusha no haka	Yōrō	at Tenshō-ji (天照寺)		35°15′49″N 136°36′03″E		
Honourable Satsuma Construction Workers' Office at Ōmaki 大巻薩摩工事役館跡; Ōmaki Satsuma kōji yakkan ato	Yōrō			35°15′25″N 136°36′33″E		
Empress Genshō Visit Site 元正天皇行幸遺跡; Genshō Tennō gyōkō iseki	Yōrō			35°17′07″N 136°32′30″E		
Gūsho-ji Site 宮処寺跡; Gūshoji ato	Tarui			35°22′05″N 136°31′32″E		
Miyashiro Haiji Site 宮代廃寺跡; Miyashiro Haiji ato	Tarui			35°22′05″N 136°31′32″E		
Nangū Jinja Sutra Mounds 南宮神社経塚群附出土品一括; Nangū Jinja kyōzuka-gun tsuketari shutsudo-hin ikkatsu	Tarui	designation includes an assemblage of excavated artefacts		35°21′07″N 136°30′58″E		
Haruō and Yasuō Graves 春王・安王の墓; Haruō・Yasuō no haka	Tarui	the young sons of Ashikaga Mochiuji				
Takenaka Jinya Site 竹中氏陣屋跡; Takenaka jinya ato	Tarui			35°23′10″N 136°30′01″E		
Tarui no Izumi 垂井の泉; Tarui no izumi	Tarui			35°22′14″N 136°31′31″E		
Fuwa Barrier Site 不破の関跡; Fuwa no seki ato	Sekigahara			35°21′32″N 136°27′30″E		
Nagae Family Graves 長江氏墓; Nagae-shi no haka	Sekigahara	at Myōō-ji (妙應寺)		35°21′00″N 136°26′07″E		
Ōyabu Arai Weir Site 大薮洗堰跡; Ōyabu Arai zeki ato	Wanouchi			35°17′21″N 136°39′56″E		
Masuya Ihee Grave 枡屋伊兵衛の墓; Masuya Ihee no haka	Wanouchi	at Enraku-ji (円楽寺)		35°17′31″N 136°39′41″E		
Satsuma Loyal Retainers' Graves at Kōō-ji 江翁寺薩摩義士墓; Kōōji Satsuma gishi no haka	Wanouchi			35°17′56″N 136°39′07″E		
Satsuma Loyal Retainers' Graves at Shingan-in 心巌院薩摩義士墓; Shingan-in Satsuma gishi no haka	Wanouchi			35°16′25″N 136°38′55″E		
Inaba Ittetsu Grave 稲葉一鉄の墓; Inaba Ittetsu no haka	Ibigawa	at Gekkei-in (月桂院)		35°28′33″N 136°35′38″E		
Toki Yorikatsu Grave 土岐頼雄の墓; Toki Yorikatsu no haka	Ibigawa	at Taikō-ji (大興寺)		35°29′40″N 136°34′43″E		
Toki Yorikiyo and Toki Yoriyasu Graves 土岐頼清・頼康父子の墓; Toki Yorikiyo・Yoriyasu fushi no haka	Ibigawa	father and son; at Zuigan-ji (瑞巌寺)		35°29′40″N 136°34′43″E		
Toki Yoriyoshi Grave 土岐頼芸の墓; Toki Yoriyoshi no haka	Ibigawa	at Hōun-ji (法雲寺)		35°33′05″N 136°37′44″E		
Kameyama Kofun 亀山古墳; Kameyama kofun	Ōno			35°26′30″N 136°37′23″E		
Kitayama Kofun 北山古墳; Kitayama kofun	Ōno			35°26′30″N 136°37′29″E		
Ganjōji Nishitsukanokoshi Kofun Cluster 願成寺西墳之越古墳群; Ganjōji Nishitsukanokoshi kofun-gun	Ikeda			35°27′08″N 136°32′41″E		
Toki Yoritada and Family Graves 土岐頼忠並びに一族之墓; Toki Yoritada narabini ichizoku no haka	Ikeda	at Zenzō-ji (禅蔵寺)		35°27′00″N 136°32′37″E		
Enkū Burial Mound 円空入定塚; Enkū nyūjō-zuka	Seki	at Miroku-ji (弥勒寺)		35°30′23″N 136°53′37″E		
Kōzuchi Port 上有知湊; Kōzuchi minato	Mino			35°33′01″N 136°54′32″E		
Mikakushiyama Kofun 身隠山古墳; Mikakushiyama kofun	Kani	designation comprises two mounds: Mikakushiyama Ontake Kofun and Mikakushiyama Hakusan Kofun		35°25′25″N 137°04′12″E		
Kumano Kofun 熊野古墳; Kumano kofun	Kani			35°25′13″N 137°04′05″E		
Fukōjizuka Kofun 不孝寺塚古墳; Fukōjizuka kofun	Kani			35°25′00″N 137°04′44″E		
Kawai Jirōbeezuka No.1 Mound 川合次郎兵衛塚一号墳; Kawai Jirōbeezuka ichi-gō fun	Kani			35°26′29″N 137°03′15″E		
Hazaki Nakabora Kofun 羽崎中洞古墳; Hazaki Nakabora kofun	Kani			35°25′02″N 137°04′56″E		
Ninonabeiri Cave Tombs 二野鍋煎横穴; Ninonabeiri yokoana	Kani			35°24′18″N 137°05′07″E		
Ōmori Sarayashiki Cave Tombs 大森皿屋敷横穴; Ōmori Sarayashiki yokoana	Kani			35°24′35″N 137°03′46″E		
Dōtaku Excavation Site 銅鐸発掘の地; Dōtaku hakkutsu no chi	Kani			35°24′28″N 137°07′17″E		
Kaneyama Port Site 兼山湊跡; Kaneyama minato ato	Kani			35°27′17″N 137°05′15″E		
Ōhirafuru Kiln Sites 大平古窯跡群; Ōhirafuru gama ato-gun	Kani					
Ōgayafuru Kiln Sites 大萱古窯跡群; Ōgayafuru gama ato-gun	Kani					
Naka Kiln Site 中窯跡; Naka kama ato	Kani					
Sengen Kiln Site 浅間窯跡; Sengen kama ato	Kani					
Akuta Jigoku Cave Site and Jōmon Ceramics 安久田地獄穴洞窟遺跡附縄文土器; Akuta jigoku ana-dōkutsu iseki tsuketari Jōmon doki	Gujō	four vessels		35°44′01″N 136°58′18″E		
Hachiman Castle Site 八幡城跡; Hachiman-jō ato	Gujō			35°45′11″N 136°57′42″E		
Sōgisui 宗祇水; Sōgisui	Gujō			35°48′28″N 136°55′33″E		
Higashiterayama Kofun 東寺山古墳; Higashiterayama kofun	Mitake			35°25′02″N 137°04′56″E		
Takarazuka Kofun 宝塚古墳; Takarazuka kofun	Mitake			35°26′15″N 137°07′26″E		
Nakagiri Kofun 中切古墳; Nakagiri kofun	Mitake			35°25′38″N 137°09′30″E		
Yamada Cave Tombs 山田横穴; Yamada yokoana	Mitake			35°26′40″N 137°05′21″E		
Kokeizan No.1 Kofun 虎溪山一号古墳; Kokeizan ichi-gō kofun	Tajimi			35°20′35″N 137°07′52″E		
Kitsunezuka Kofun 狐塚古墳; Kitsunezuka kofun	Tajimi			35°18′07″N 137°09′11″E		
Myōdo Kiln Site 妙土窯跡; Myōdo kama ato	Tajimi			35°18′23″N 137°09′14″E		
Tajimi Kuninaga Residence Site 多治見国長邸跡; Tajimi Kuninaga tei ato	Tajimi			35°19′59″N 137°07′46″E		
Nojiri Site 野尻遺跡; Nojiri iseki	Nakatsugawa			35°33′17″N 137°26′51″E		
Nakaaraikita No.1 Kiln Site 中洗井北第一号窯跡; Nakaaraikita daiichi-gō kama ato	Nakatsugawa			35°29′08″N 137°27′09″E		
Shimazaki Tōson Residence (Magome-juku Honjin) Site 島崎藤村宅（馬籠宿本陣）跡; Shimazaki Tōson taku (Magome-juku honjin) ato	Nakatsugawa	now the Tōson Memorial Museum		35°31′37″N 137°34′02″E		
Togari Kōjinzuka Kofun 戸狩荒神塚古墳; Togari Kōjinzuka kofun	Mizunami			35°22′05″N 137°14′10″E		
Togari Cave Tombs 戸狩横穴群; Togari yokoana-gun	Mizunami			35°22′08″N 137°14′12″E		
Ori Castle Site 小里城跡; Ori-jō ato	Mizunami			35°20′04″N 137°17′01″E		
Tsuruga Castle Site 鶴ヶ城跡; Tsuruga-jō ato	Mizunami			35°23′24″N 137°16′03″E		
Toki Yorisada Grave 土岐頼貞墓; Toki Yorisada no haka	Mizunami			35°22′04″N 137°15′41″E		
Santai Shōnin Memorial Stele 三諦上人供養塔; Santai Shōnin kuyōtō	Mizunami					
Tokudaira Kofun 徳平古墳; Tokudaira kofun	Ena			35°18′22″N 137°23′10″E		
Kugo Kofun 久後古墳; Kugo kofun	Ena			35°18′17″N 137°23′08″E		
Nōmanji Kofun Cluster 能万寺古墳群; Nōmanji kofun-gun	Ena			35°27′17″N 137°24′10″E		
Iwamura Castle Site 岩村城跡; Iwamura-jō ato	Ena			35°21′36″N 137°27′05″E		
Akechi Castle Site 明知城跡; Akechi-jō ato	Ena			35°18′13″N 137°23′40″E		
Ichijō Nobuyoshi Downfall Site 一条信能終焉跡; Ichijō Nobuyoshi shūen ato	Ena	at Iwamura Jinja (岩村神社)		35°21′48″N 137°26′08″E		
Chishinkan Seimon and Sekiten-no-Ma 知新館正門・釈奠の間附孔子画像軸; Chishinkan Seimon・Sekiten-no-Ma tsuketari Kōshi gazō-jiku	Ena	designation includes an image of Confucius		35°21′52″N 137°26′49″E		
Ichirizuka 一里塚; Ichirizuka	Ena			35°26′38″N 137°22′49″E		
Ichirizuka 一里塚; Ichirizuka	Ena					
Ōi-juku Honjin Site 大井宿本陣跡; Ōi-juku honjin ato	Ena			35°27′21″N 137°24′54″E		
So-called Tomb of Saigyō 伝西行塚 den-Saigyō-zuka	Ena			35°27′02″N 137°23′21″E		
Sumiyaki Kofun 炭焼古墳; Sumiyaki kofun	Toki			35°22′21″N 137°11′37″E		
Tsumaki Castle Site 妻木城跡; Tsumaki-jō ato	Toki			35°17′33″N 137°11′42″E		
Tsumaki Castle Samurai Residence Site 妻木城士屋敷跡; Tsumaki-jō samurai yashiki ato	Toki			35°17′46″N 137°11′34″E		
Jōmon-type Dwelling Site 縄文式住居跡; Jōmon-shiki jūkyo ato	Takayama			36°11′48″N 137°15′25″E		
Akahogi Stone Age Furnace 赤保木石器時代火爐; Akahogi seki-jidai karo	Takayama			36°09′35″N 137°13′18″E		
Araki Jinja Site 荒城神社遺跡; Araki Jinja iseki	Takayama			36°13′08″N 137°15′35″E		
Kōtōgeguchi Kofun こう峠口古墳; Kōtōgeguchi kofun	Takayama			36°12′25″N 137°13′37″E		
Akabogi Kofun Cluster 赤保木古墳群; Akabogi kofun-gun	Takayama			36°09′44″N 137°13′54″E		
Nabeyama Castle Site 鍋山城跡; Nabeyama-jō ato	Takayama			36°09′05″N 137°17′27″E		
Hirose Castle Site 広瀬城跡附田中筑前守墓碑; Hirose-jō ato tsuketari Tanaka Chikuzen nokami bohi	Takayama			36°12′01″N 137°13′12″E		
Takadō Castle Site 高堂城跡附田中筑前守墓碑; Takadō-jō ato tsuketari Tanaka Chikuzen nokami bohi	Takayama			36°11′44″N 137°12′05″E		
Sanbutsuji Castle Site 三佛寺城跡; Sanbutsuji-jō ato	Takayama			36°09′16″N 137°16′11″E		
Takayama Castle Site 高山城跡; Takayama-jō ato	Takayama	also a Prefectural Natural Monument		35°21′56″N 137°10′51″E		
Ena Bunko Earthen Storehouse 荏野文庫土蔵; Ena Bunko dozō	Takayama			36°08′08″N 137°16′14″E		
Yoshima Old Kiln Site よしま古窯跡; Yoshima koyō ato	Takayama			36°10′02″N 137°12′25″E		
Tanaka Ōhide Grave 田中大秀墓; Tanaka Ōhide no haka	Takayama			36°07′54″N 137°16′59″E		
Akada Gagyū Grave 赤田臥牛墓; Akada Gagyū no haka	Takayama					
Katō Hoshō Grave 加藤歩簫墓; Katō Hoshō no haka	Takayama					
Narita Masatoshi Grave 成田正利の墓; Narita Masatoshi no haka	Takayama					
Goban Yashiki Prehistoric Dwelling Site 御番屋敷先史時代住居跡; Goban yashiki senshi jidai jūkyo ato	Hida			36°15′15″N 137°10′07″E		
Nobuka Hachiman Jinja Site Keyhole Tumulus 信包八幡神社跡前方後円墳; Nobuka Hachiman Jinja ato zenpō kōen fun	Hida			36°15′16″N 137°08′31″E		
Takano Kōzenji Circular Tumulus 高野光泉寺円墳; Takano Kōzenji enpun	Hida			36°13′22″N 137°10′11″E		
Takano Mizukami Circular Tumulus 高野水上円墳; Takano Mizukami enpun	Hida			36°13′27″N 137°10′24″E		
Ōboradaira No.1 Kofun 大洞平第一号古墳; Ōboradaira daiichi-gō kofun	Hida			36°14′34″N 137°09′25″E		
Ōboradaira No.2 Kofun 大洞平第二号古墳; Ōboradaira daini-gō kofun	Hida			36°14′36″N 137°09′23″E		
Masushima Castle Site 増島城跡; Masushima-jō ato	Hida			36°14′03″N 137°11′32″E		
Sugisaki Haiji Site 杉崎廃寺跡; Sugisaki Haiji ato	Hida			36°15′27″N 137°09′30″E		
Katō Hoshō Rock Inscriptions 加藤歩簫文字書岩; Katō Hoshō moji-kaki iwa	Hida			36°25′23″N 137°17′01″E		
Kanamori Sōtei Residence Site 金森宗貞邸跡; Kanamori Sōtei tei ato	Hida	in the grounds of Kinryū-ji (金龍寺)		36°26′06″N 137°16′33″E		
Iwaya Iwakage Site 岩屋岩蔭遺跡; Iwaya Iwakage iseki	Gero			35°45′17″N 137°09′34″E		
Suwa Castle Site 諏訪城跡; Suwa-jō ato	Gero			35°52′28″N 137°12′37″E		
Domain Territory Boundary Stones 藩領境標石; Han-ryō sakai hyōseki	Gero					
Hōjibizan Daiitoku-ji Site 鳳慈尾山大威徳寺跡; Hōjibizan Daiitokuji ato	Gero			35°45′40″N 137°19′53″E		
Hatsuya Pass Cobblestones 初矢峠の石畳; Hatsuya-tōge no ishidatami	Gero					
Hishū Shimohara Nakatsunaba 飛州下原中綱場; Hishū Shimohara Nakatsunaba	Gero					
Takekawa Kyūbee Grave 武川久兵衛の墓; Takekawa Kyūbee no haka	Gero	at Onsen-ji (温泉寺)		35°48′39″N 137°14′33″E		

== Municipal Historic Sites ==
As of 1 May 2025, a further eight hundred and seventy-four Sites have been designated as being of municipal importance.

== See also ==
- Cultural property (Japan)
- List of Places of Scenic Beauty of Japan (Gifu)
- List of Cultural Properties of Japan - paintings (Gifu)
- Gifu Prefectural Museum
