= Nagatsuka =

== People ==
Nagatsuka (written: 長塚) is a Japanese surname. Notable people with the surname include:

- Kyōko Nagatsuka (長塚 京子) (born 1974), Japanese tennis player
- Kyōzō Nagatsuka (長塚 京三) (born 1945), Japanese actor
- Takashi Nagatsuka (長塚 節) (1879–1915), Japanese poet and writer
- Tomohiro Nagatsuka (長塚 智広) (born 1978), Japanese cyclist

== Places ==
- Nagatsuka Kofun, a kofun burial mound in Kani, Gifu Prefecture
