= Otozuka Kofun - Danjirimaki Kofun =

Japanese burial mounds

- 乙塚古墳 附 段尻巻古墳 (Japanese)
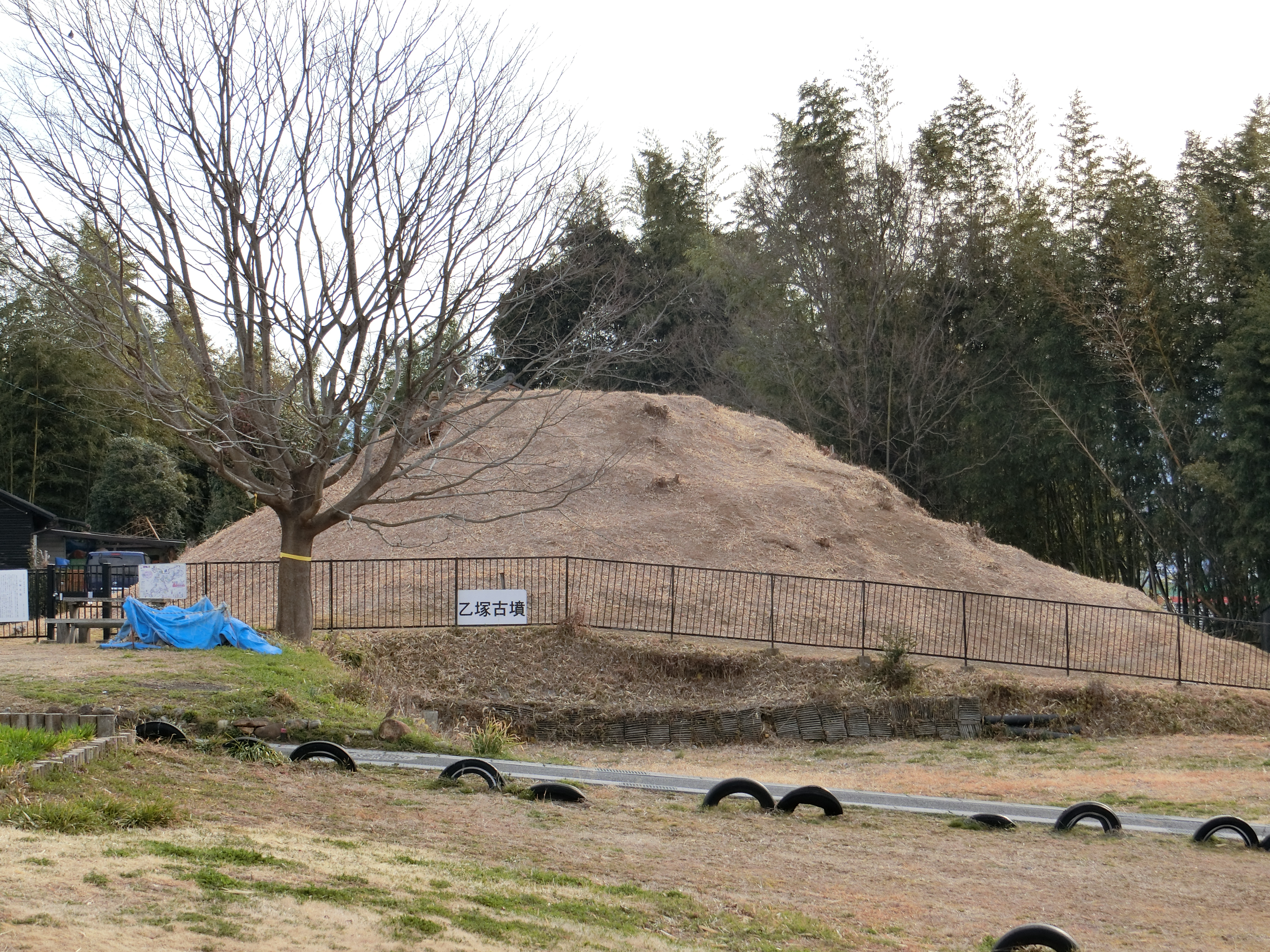
- Otozuka Kofun

- Otozuka Kofun - Danjirimaki Kofun Otozuka Kofun - Danjirimaki Kofun (Japan)
- 35°21′56″N 137°10′51″E
- Type: kofun
- Periods: Kofun period
- Location: Toki, Gifu, Japan
- Region: Chūbu region

Site notes
- Public access: Yes (no public facilities)

Otozuka Kofun - Danjirimaki Kofun (乙塚古墳 附 段尻巻古墳, Otozuka kofun tsuketari Danjirimaki kofun) is a pair of kofun burial mounds located in the Izumi neighborhood of the city of Toki, Gifu in the Chūbu region of Japan. The two tumuli were collectively designated a National Historic Site of Japan in 1938.

== Overview ==
The Otozuka kofun is a square-shaped (hōfun (方墳)) kofun located on a river terrace of the Toki River at an elevation of 150 metres (490 ft) in the northern part of the city for Toki. It is the largest kofun in the city. It is 7.3 metres (24 ft) on each side with a height of 6.6 metres (22 ft). The burial chamber is a lateral stone-lined chamber facing south with a total length of 12.1 metres (40 ft). The burial chamber itself has dimensions of 5.2 by 2.6 by 2.7 metres (17.1 ft × 8.5 ft × 8.9 ft) (length, width, height). The back wall of the burial chamber is a granite monolith, with dimensions of 2 by 2.7 metres (6 ft 7 in × 8 ft 10 in), and the walls are a mixture of granite and chert stones in three tiers. Huge monolithic stones were also used for the ceiling. From the construction method, it is believed that the tumulus dates from the middle of the seventh century. According to local tradition, this is the tomb of Oto-hime, the younger sister of Yasakarihime, consort to the legendary Emperor Keikō (71–130 AD).

The tomb has been open since ancient times, and was used as a Buddhist chapel in the Edo Period and as an air raid shelter in World War II. For many years, it was controlled by a local Shinto shrine, but was purchased by the city of Toki. In 1988, the trees which had grown on the tumulus were cut down, revealing its true configuration, and an archaeological excavation was conducted by the Toki City Board of Education from 2003 to 2006. Fragments of Sue ware pottery were also discovered.

The Danjirimaki kofun is a circular-shaped tumulus (empun (円墳)) located 70 meters to the northwest of the Otozuka Kofun. It has a diameter of 12.8 meters and height of 3.6 meters. The burial chamber is also a lateral passage opening to the south, with a total length of 8.7 meters. A monolith with a width of 1.7 meters was used for the back wall, and the side walls were lined with granite and chert in three layers. This tumulus is also thought to date from the first half to the middle of the 7th century.

The site is about a 15-minute walk from Tokishi Station on the JR East Chūō Main Line.

== See also ==
- List of Historic Sites of Japan (Gifu)
