= Oibora-Asakura Sue Ware Kiln Site =

- 老洞・朝倉須恵器窯跡 (Japanese)
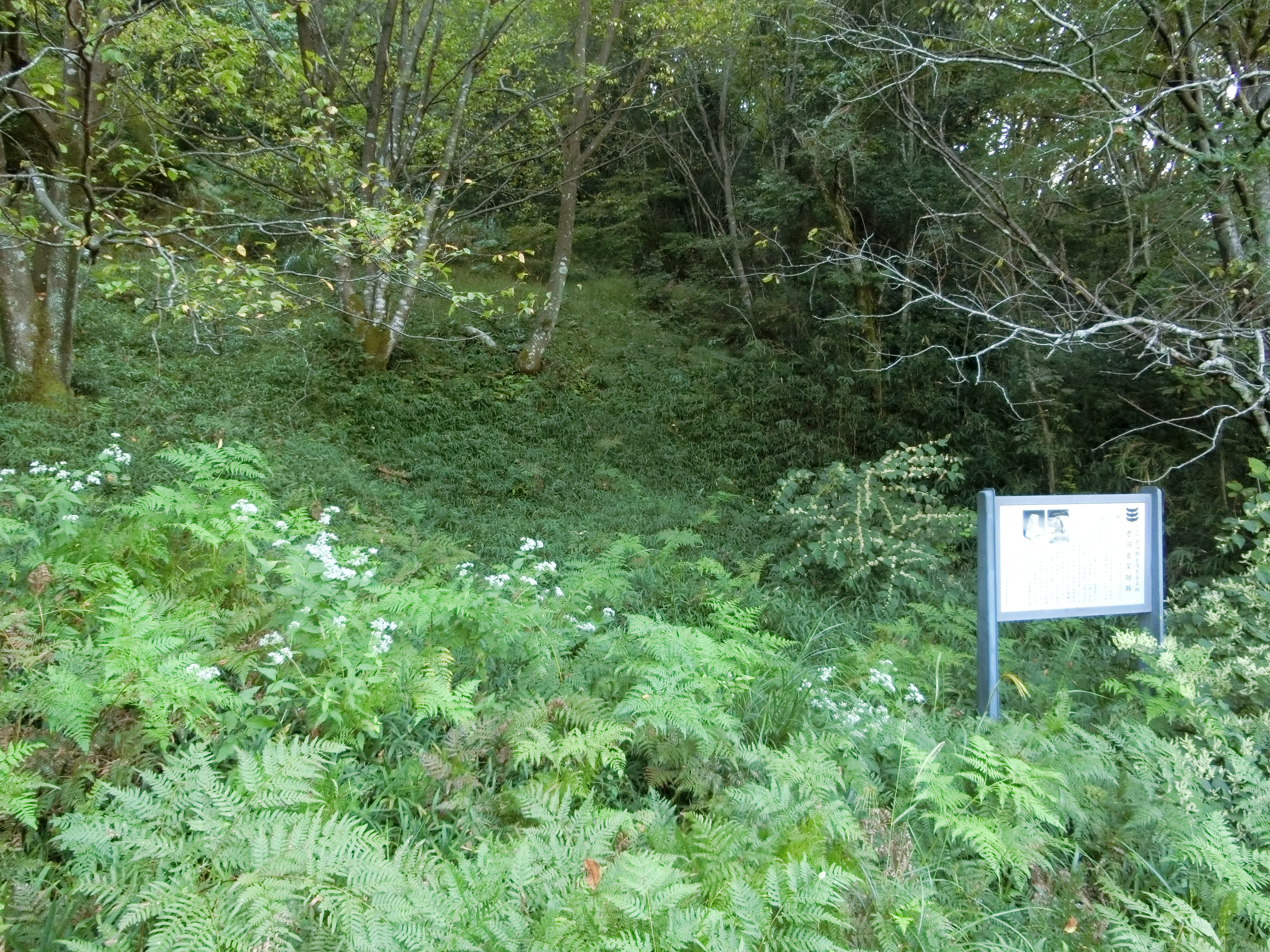
- Oibora Sue Ware Kiln Site

- Oibora-Asakura Sue Ware Kiln Site Oibora-Asakura Sue Ware Kiln Site (Japan)
- 35°26′43″N 136°50′55″E
- Periods: Nara period
- Location: Gifu, Gifu, Japan
- Region: Chūbu region

Site notes
- Discovered: 1967
- Public access: Yes (no public facilities)

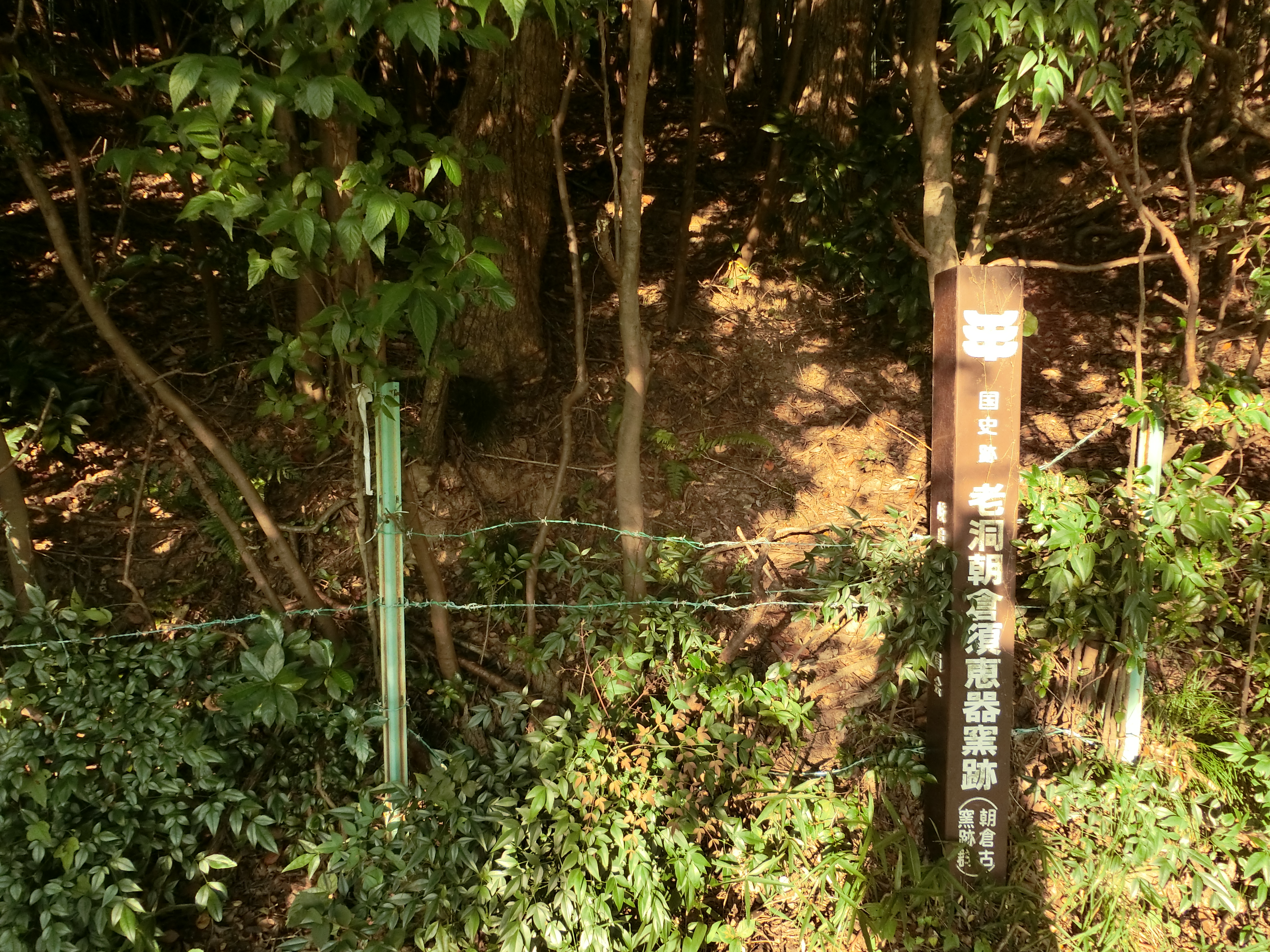
Asakura Sue Ware Kiln Site

The Oibora-Asakura Sue Ware Kiln Site (老洞・朝倉須恵器窯跡, Oibora-Asakura sueki kama ato) is an archaeological site containing a group of Nara period kilns located in the Akutami neighborhood of the city of Gifu in the Chūbu region of Japan. The site was designated a National Historic Site of Japan in 1979.

== Overview ==
Ancient Mino Province was a major center for the manufacturing of Sue pottery from before the Nara period, and numerous ruins of ancient kilns have been found in the area around the border of the modern cities of Gifu, Toki and Kakamigahara. In the southern foothills of the Kakamigahara Mountains more than 130 Sue pottery kilns from the Nara and Heian periods are distributed. The Oibora-Asakura site is located on the western edge of this area, on the northern and southern slopes of the Suwa Mountains near the Nagara River. In 1967, a Sue pottery engraved with the words "Mino Kuni" was excavated from the remains of the Asakura kiln at the southern foot of the mountain, and more than four kiln sites were later discovered. In 1977, another site containing a Sue pottery fragment stamped with the "Mino Province" mark was discovered from the Oibora kiln site at the northern foot of the mountain, and three kiln ruins were confirmed at this location. Both sites date from the latter half of the 7th century to the early 8th century and our 70,000 pottery shards were found. A ceramic stamp for making the "Mino Province" marking was also found at the Oibora site.

Some of the Sue pottery made at these sites have been discovered at various locations around Japan, including the site of the Heijō Palace in Nara, Ise Shrine in Mie prefecture and the Mino Kokubun-ji ruins.

The Oibora kiln site is about a ten minute walk from the "Higashi-Asakura" bus stop on the Gifu Bus from Meitetsu Gifu Station and the Asakura kiln site is about ten minutes from the "Suwayama housing complex" bus stop on the same route. Some of the excavated items from the Oibora kiln site are designated as Important Cultural Properties, and are at the Gifu City History Museum.

== See also ==
- List of Historic Sites of Japan (Gifu)
