= Higashi-Chōda Kofun group =

Yayoi period burial mounds in Ōgaki, Japan

- 東町田墳墓群 (Japanese)
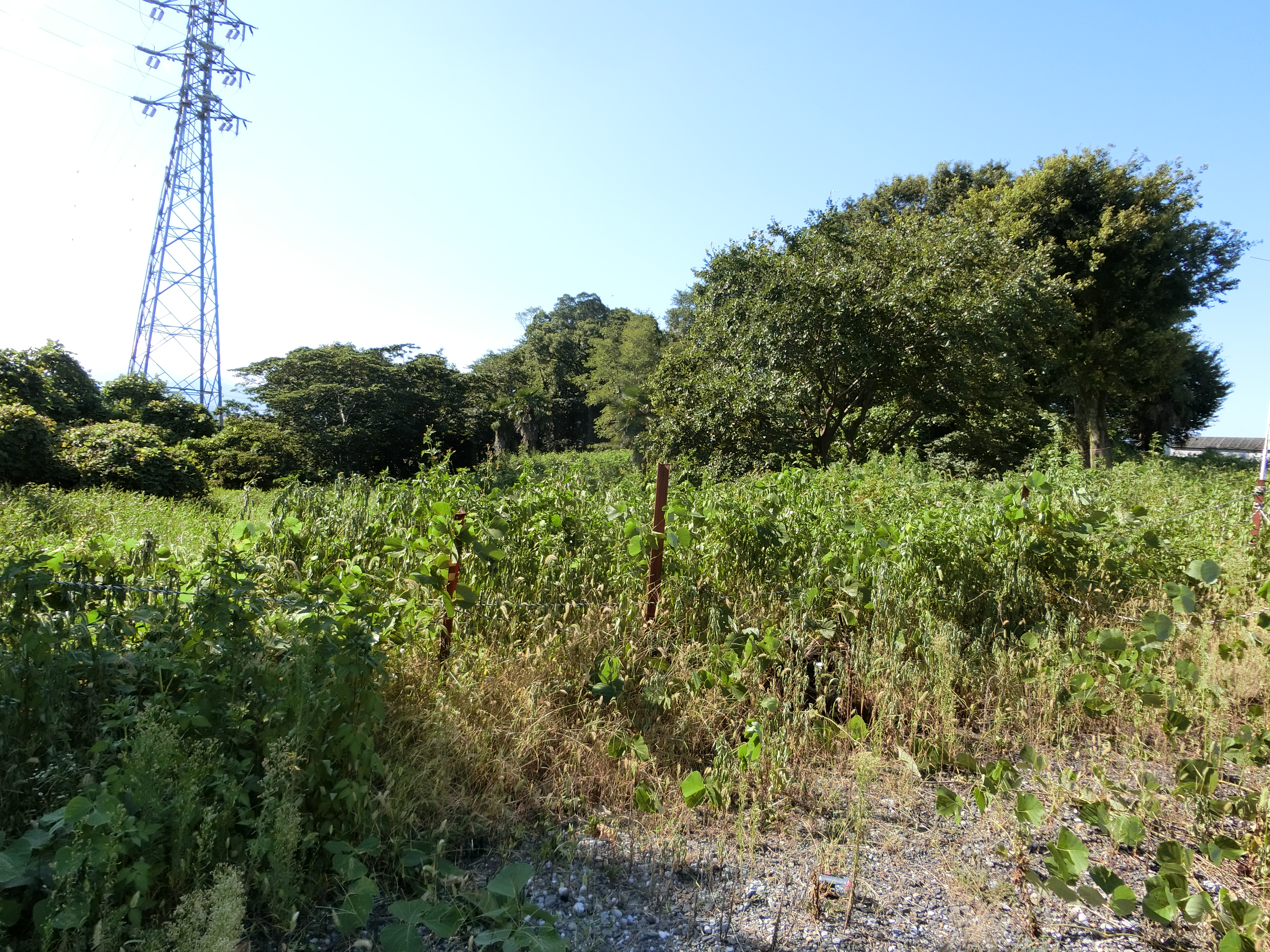
- Higashi-Chōda Kofun group

- Higashi-Chōda Kofun group Higashi-Chōda Kofun group (Japan)
- 35°22′49″N 136°34′10″E
- Type: kofun
- Periods: Yayoi period
- Location: Ōgaki, Gifu, Japan
- Region: Chūbu region

History
- Built: late 3rd to early 4th century

Site notes
- Area: 5,107 m^{2} (54,970 sq ft)
- Public access: Yes (No public facilities)

Higashi-Chōda Kofun group (東町田墳墓群, Higashi-Chōda funbo-gun) is a cluster of Yayoi period burial mounds located in the Hirui neighborhood of what is now the city of Ōgaki, Gifu Prefecture in the Chūbu region of Japan. It was designated a National Historic Site of Japan in 2017. The site is important as it covers a transitional period between the Yayoi and the later Kofun period.

== Overview ==
The Higashi-Chōda Kofun Group is located on a river terrace at an elevation of 15 to 18 meters at the foot of Mount Kinsei in the northwestern part of Ōgaki. The area has been inhabited from the Jōmon period through the Heian period as it is terrains which is resistant to flood damage. Two kilometers to the southeast is the Arao Minami Ruins, which was a contemporary settlement with a double moat. Nine burial mounds and burial mounds have been confirmed so far, which were built from the end of the Yayoi period to the early Kofun period. These include two square kofun (hōfun (方墳)), two round kofun (empun (円墳)) in close proximity (which date from the Yayoi period), and to the east, two "cojoined-rectangle" style keyhole kofun (zenpō-kōhō-fun (前方後方墳)) and three more square kofun (which date from the very end of the Yayoi period to the start of the Kofun period). No fukiishi or haniwa have been found, but traces of moats remain. All of the tombs area relatively small, with the square kofun less than 10 meters on each side. No trace of the burial chambers have survived.

The site was excavated from 2010 through 2014. A large amount of Yayoi pottery was recovered, some depicting people, gabled stilt buildings, deer and other animals. Other items included stone mills coated with vermillion. These artifacts are designated an Ōgaki City Important Cultural Property and are displayed at the Ōgaki City Museum of History and Folklore (大垣市歴史民俗資料館, Ōgaki-shi rekishi minzoku shiryōkan).

== See also ==
- List of Historic Sites of Japan (Gifu)
