= Dōnosora Site =

Archaeological site in Takayama, Chūbu, Japan

- 堂之上遺跡 (Japanese)
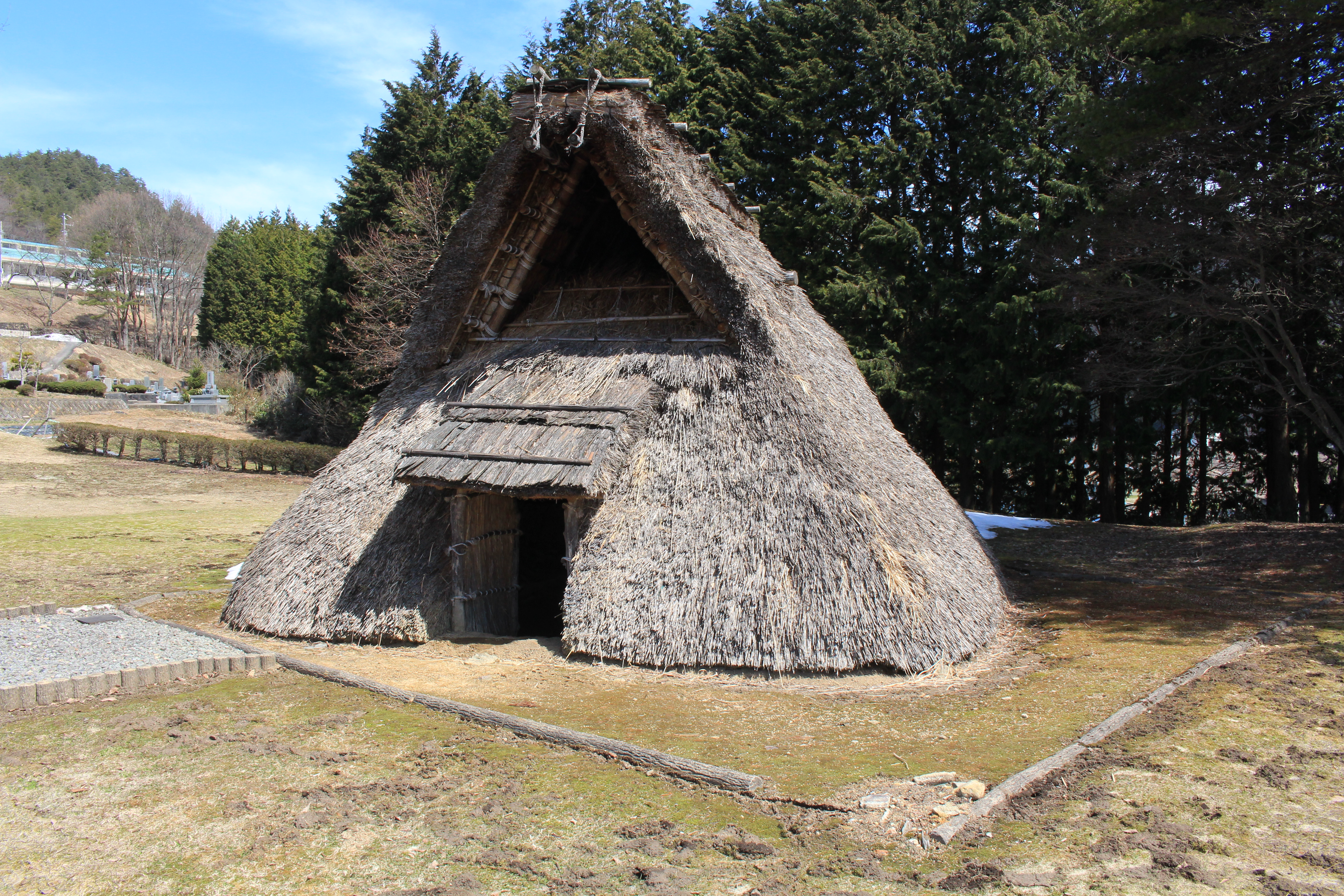
- Pit house at Dōnosora Site

- Dōnosora Site Dōnosora Site (Japan)
- 36°03′13″N 137°16′47″E
- Type: settlement
- Periods: Jōmon period
- Location: Takayama, Gifu, Japan
- Region: Chūbu region

History
- Built: 4000 - 1500 BCE

Site notes
- Elevation: 680 m (2,230 ft)
- Public access: Yes (park and museum)

The Dōnosora Site (堂之上遺跡, Dōnosora iseki) is an archaeological site and the ruins of an early to middle Jōmon period settlement in the Kugono neighborhood of the city of Takayama, Gifu in the Chūbu region of Japan. The ruins were designated a National Historic Site of Japan in 1980.

== Overview ==
The Dōnosora Site is located on a small river terrace where the Hida River meets the Hasshaku River, near the southern slope of the watershed of Japan in the Northern Alps at an altitude of 680 meters. The site covers 7,500 square meters and was first reported to academia in 1897. A full-scale archaeological excavation conducted from 1973 to 1979 discovered the foundations of 43 pit dwellings from the early and middle Jōmon period, arranged as an annular village surrounding a central plaza. This plaza had more than 200 standing stones and numerous storage pits containing remnants of nuts, such as Japanese chestnuts, acorns, and walnuts. The pit dwellings from the latter half of the mid-Jōmon period could be divided into two types. One type contained stone-lined hearths made from river stones and buried pots, and the other contained a double stone hearth with large flat stones laid around to form a cobblestone floor. Jōmon pottery shards found were from the Kantō region of Japan and from the Tōkai and Kansai regions of Japan, inducing that this site was on a trade route between the east and west, and also between the Pacific and Sea of Japan coasts.

The site is now a public archaeological park, with a number of reconstructed pit dwellings, and the adjacent Kuguno History and Folklore Museum (久々野歴史民俗資料館, Kuguno rekishi minzoku shiryōkan), which displays some 200 artifacts recovered from the site, as well as 350 cultural items, such as traditional farm tools. The site is about a 10-minute walk from Kuguno Station on the JR East Takayama Main Line.

== See also ==
- List of Historic Sites of Japan (Gifu)
