= Akahogi Tile Kiln Site =

Archaeological site in Takayama, Japan

- 赤保木瓦窯跡 (Chinese)
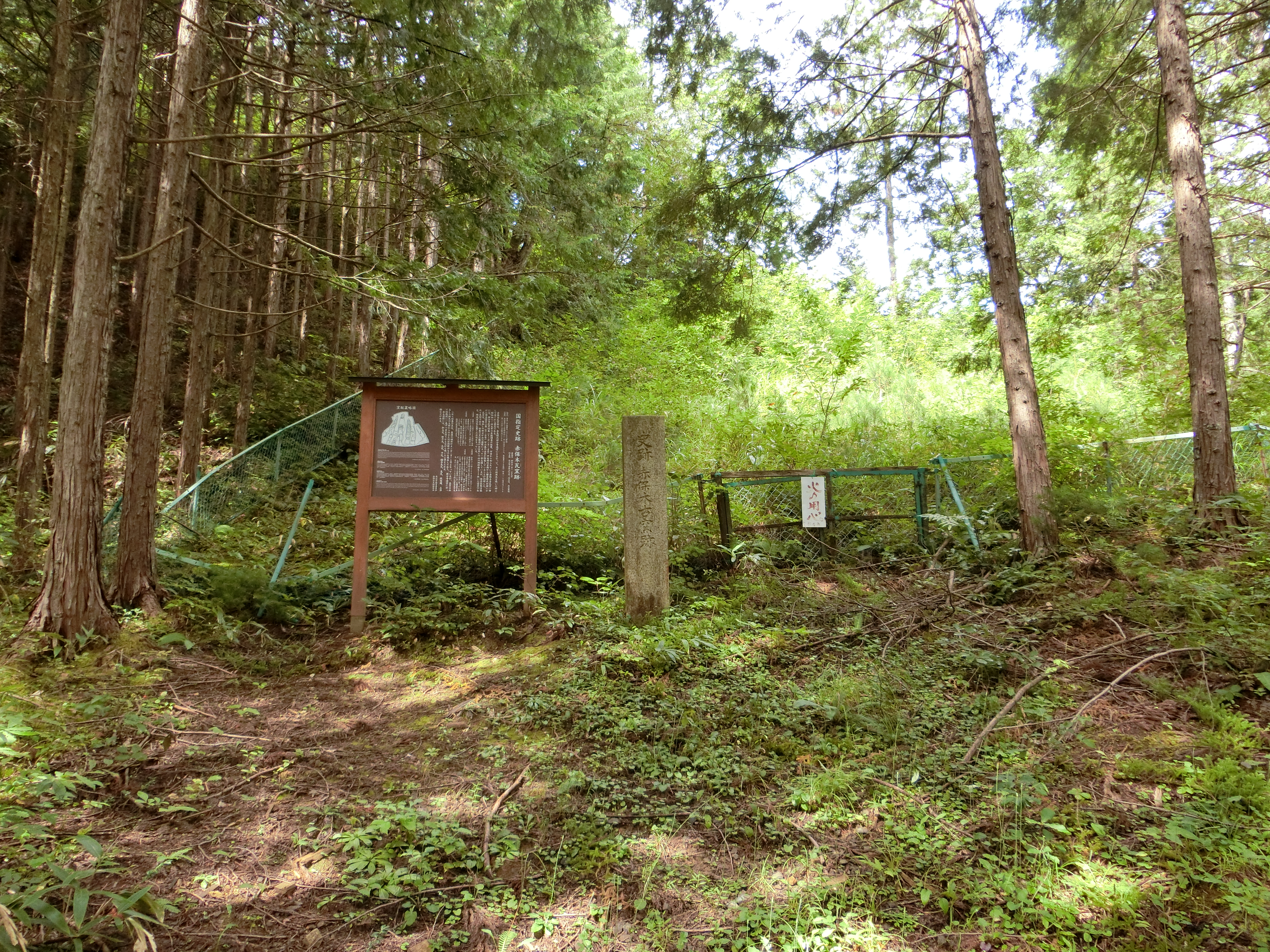
- Akahogi Tile Kiln Site

- Akahogi Tile Kiln Site Akahogi Tile Kiln Site (Japan)
- 36°09′39″N 137°13′11″E
- Type: ancient kiln
- Periods: late Nara to early Heian period
- Location: Takayama, Gifu, Japan
- Region: Chūbu region

Site notes
- Public access: Yes (no public facilities)

The Akahogi Tile Kiln site (赤保木瓦窯跡, Akahogi Kawara Kama-ato) is the remains of a late Nara period, early Heian period roof tile and pottery production site located in the Akahogi neighborhood of the city of Takayama, Gifu Prefecture in the Chūbu region of Japan. It has been protected as a National Historic Site since 1976.

== Overview ==
Akahogi Tile Kiln site is located in the southeastern foothills of the Mihaka hills northwest of the central area of Takayama city. The site consists of the ruins of six kilns within a range of approximately 70 square meters. The kilns consists of four semi-underground anagama kilns with a length of approximately eight meters and two semi-underground noborigama-type climbing kilns. The former were used for the production of roof tiles, and the latter for Sue pottery. From the ruins of the tile kilns, shards of various types of roof tiles were discovered, including round tiles for use on eaves, flat tiles, corner tiles and Onigawara tiles, all of which are identical to shards found at the site of the Hida Kokubun-ji provincial temple established in the Nara period.

The tile kilns are almost identical in structure: The No. 1 kiln has a total length of 8.34 meters, a width of 0.75 meters, and contains 16 steps. It appears to have been repaired twice, but most of the firing chamber has been lost due to a landslide. The No. 2 kiln has a total length 9.38 meters, a width 1.08 meters. Although the ceiling has completely survived, it appears to have been abandoned at an early date. It has been repaired four times, and the number of steps is currently unknown. The No. 3 kiln has a total length of 8.14 meters and a width of 0.70 meters. The firing chamber has six stages and the width of each step is wide, which is different from the others. It has been repaired three times. The No.4 kiln is located on the lowest portion of the hill, and has a width of 1.0 meter. The ceiling part is completely intact, and it appears to be the oldest of the group, but the kiln itself remains unexcavated.

From the shards excavated as the site, these four kilns produced the roof tiles used at the Hida Kokubun-ji, including the round eaves tiles and the Onigawara tiles.

The Sue pottery kilns are labelled No.5 and No.6 and were in continuous use until into the Kamakura period.

The site is about 15 minutes by car from Takayama Station on the JR East Takayama Main Line.

== See also ==
- List of Historic Sites of Japan (Gifu)
