= Nishitakagike Jin'ya =

- 西高木家陣屋
- Ōgaki, Gifu, Japan
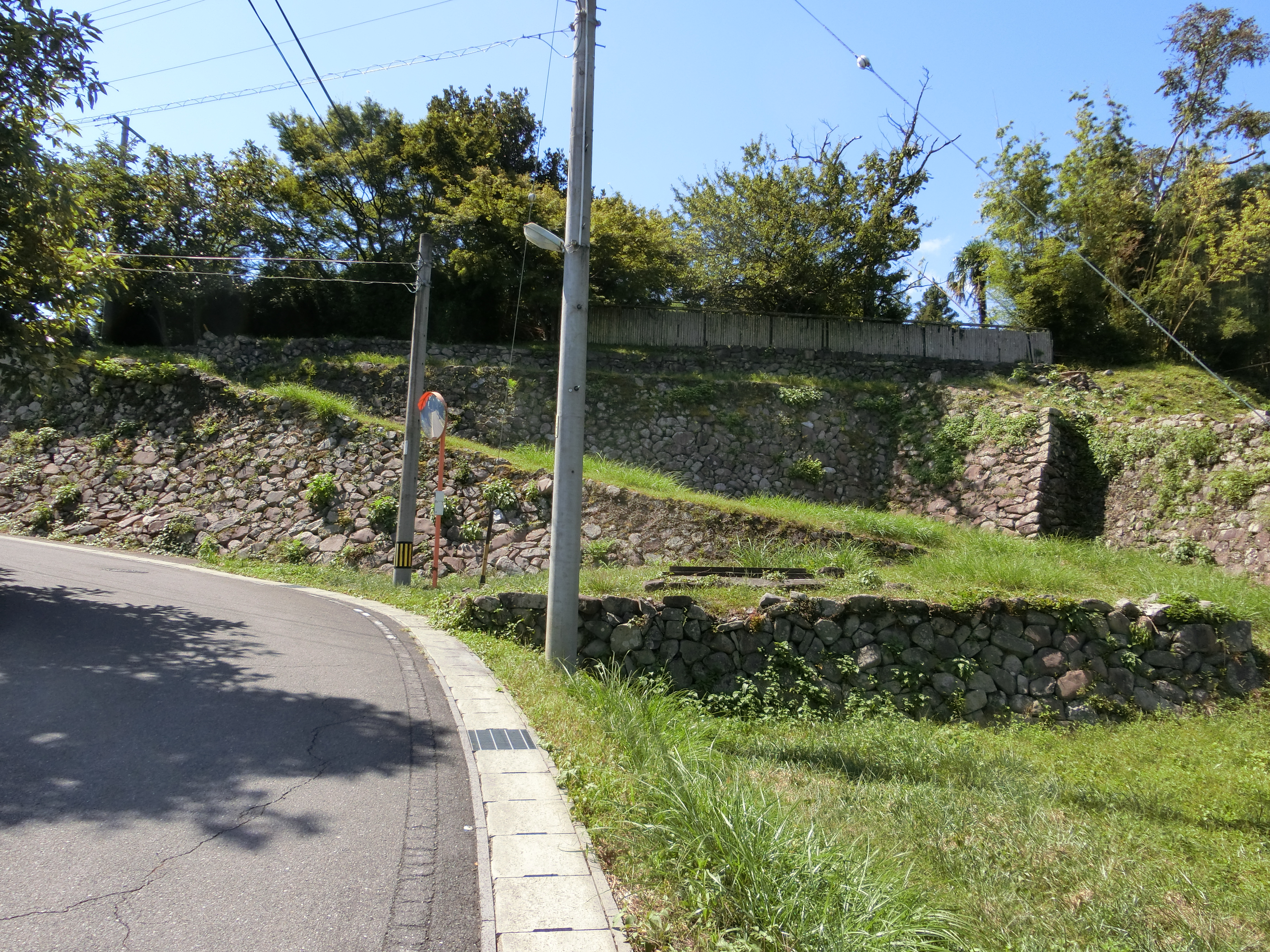
- Nishitakagike Jin'ya

Site information
- Type: hiraya-style Japanese castle
- Open to the public: yes

Location
- Nishitakagike Jin'ya Nishitakagike Jin'ya (Japan)
- Coordinates: 35°21′34″N 136°36′46″E

Site history
- Built: Edo period
- Built by: Takagi Sadatoshi
- In use: Edo period

Nishitakagike Jin'ya (西高木家陣屋, Nishitakagike jin'ya) was the fortified residence jin'ya of the hatamoto Takagi clan under the Edo period Tokugawa shogunate. It was located in the Kamiishizu neighborhood of the city of Ōgaki, Gifu Prefecture in the Chūbu region of Japan. The site has been protected as a National Historic Site since 2014.

== Overview ==
During the Sengoku period, Takagi Sadatoshi was a vassal of Saito Dosan, followed by Oda Nobunaga and Oda Nobukatsu. After the Battle of Komaki and Nagakute, he was deprived of his holdings by Toyotomi Hideyoshi and forced to flee into exile in Kai Province. The Takagi territories in Mino Province were given to Seki Kazumasa, who built Tara Castle in either the Tenshō era (1573-93) or the Keichō era (1593-1615). During the Battle of Sekigahara, he served the Eastern Army and was awarded with a domain in Ise Province. In the meanwhile, Takagi Sadatoshi had also become a vassal of Tokugawa Ieyasu and was allowed to recover his ancestral home after the departure of the Seki clan. He divided the Takagi clan into three branches: the western (Nishitakagi) branch had a kokudaka of 2300 koku, the eastern (Higashitakagi) has 1000 koku, and the northern (Kitatakagi) also had 1000 koku, and each of the three branches constructed a jin'ya residence at the same location in 1601. The three branches were regarded by the Tokugawa shogunate as a single entity, and despite its hatamoto status, the clan was subject to the Sankin-kōtai requirement of having to make a trip to Edo every other year to attend the Shogun's court.

The site of the Nishitakagi jin'ya is located on a river terrace at an elevation of 130 meters, next to the Makita River, a tributary of the Ibi River. An important role played by the clan was that of Kawadori, which gave them control of all traffic on the Kiso Three Rivers. The jin'ya was constructed with the Ise Kaidō, the main highway to Ise Province, on its east side. It was protected by extensive stone walls, much of which date from the earlier Tara Castle. Within the compound was the main residence on the north side, and a secondary residence on the south side, with the clan cemetery in the west. Most of the structures burned down in a fire in 1832. The main gate was restored in 1852 and the mansion itself in 1896, although on the site of the former secondary residence. Archaeological excavations have indicated that the underground remains of the original foundations are well preserved. The sites of the smaller jin'ya for the Higashitakagi and Kitatakagi branches have been lost to encroachment of residences and farmlands, and are not covered in the National Historic Site designation.

The jin'ya is now the Kamiishizu Museum (大垣市上石津資料館, Ōgaki-shi Kamiishidzu shiryōkan), which introduces the nature, history, and culture of the Kamiishizu area and which stores the more than 100,000 ancient documents that have been handed down by the Takagi clan.

== See also ==
- List of Historic Sites of Japan (Gifu)
