= Funakiyama Kofun cluster =

Kofun period burial mounds in Motosu, Chūbu, Japan

Funakiyama Kofun group
- 船来山古墳群 (Japanese)
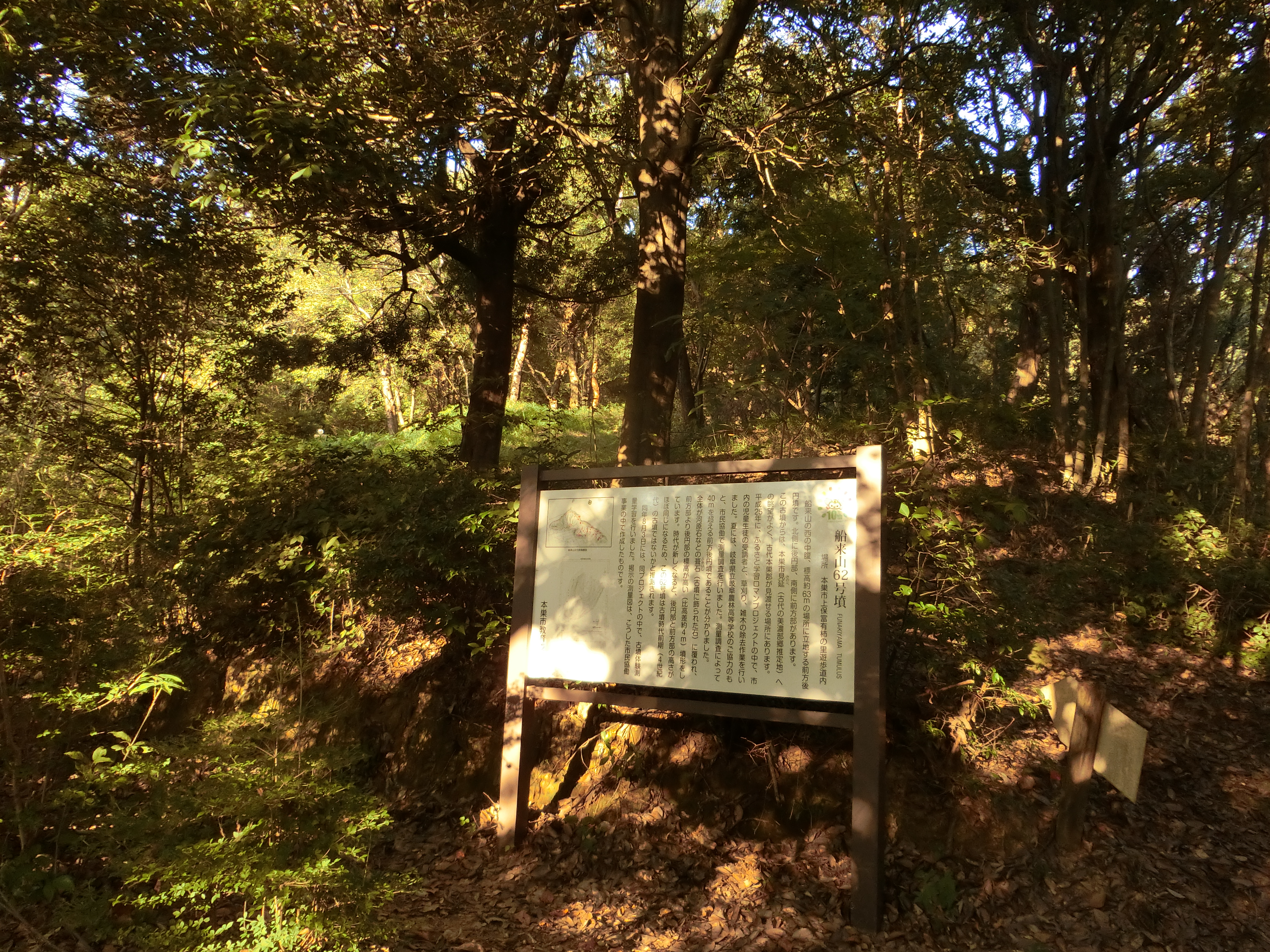
- Funakiyama Kofun No.62

- Funakiyama Kofun group Funakiyama Kofun cluster (Japan)
- 35°28′30″N 136°40′59″E
- Type: kofun
- Periods: Kofun period
- Location: Motosu, Gifu, Japan
- Region: Chūbu region

History
- Built: 4th century to 7th century

Site notes
- Area: 155,420.74 m^{2} (1,672,934.9 sq ft)
- Public access: Yes (No public facilities)
- National Historic Site of Japan

Funakiyama Kofun group (船来山古墳群, Funakiyama kofun-gun) is a cluster of Kofun period burial mounds located the city of Motosu, Gifu Prefecture in the Chūbu region of Japan. It was designated a National Historic Site of Japan in 2018.

== Overview ==
The Funaiyama Kofun group is the largest cluster of kofun in the Tōkai region, and was constructed from the 3rd to the 7th century, on a mountain called Mount Funaki straddling the border of the cities of Motosu and Gifu. To date, 290 burial mounds have been discovered. Mount Funaki is a long and narrow mountain about 2 kilometers east-to-west by about 600 meters north-to-south, with an elevation of 64 to 115 meters. The ancient burial mounds are built from the foot of the mountain to the summit, and consist of various types of kofun: square (hōfun (方墳)), round (empun (円墳)), two "cojoined-rectangle" style (zenpō-kōhō-fun (前方後方墳)) and keyhole-style (zempō-kōen fun (前方後円墳)). Approximately a quarter of the mountain is covered by the National Historic Site designation, including 111 tumuli (112 if a single Yayoi period tomb is included), all of which are on the Motosu side of the mountain.

Of the 290 tombs, 237 are on the Motosu side, and 162 of these have been excavated. Both horizontal and vertical type burial chambers have been found, often with large quantities of grave goods, which included bronze mirrors, iron swords and armor, horse fittings, agricultural implements, jewelry (such as round and cylindrical beads, and magatama), Sue ware and Haji ware pottery, and human bones. On October 13, 2017, 687 items excavated were designated as Gifu Prefecture Important Cultural Properties and 8,093 other excavated artifacts were designated as Tangible Cultural Properties of Motosu city.

== See also ==
- List of Historic Sites of Japan (Gifu)
