= Ema clan castle ruins =

- 江馬氏城館跡
- Hida, Gifu, Japan
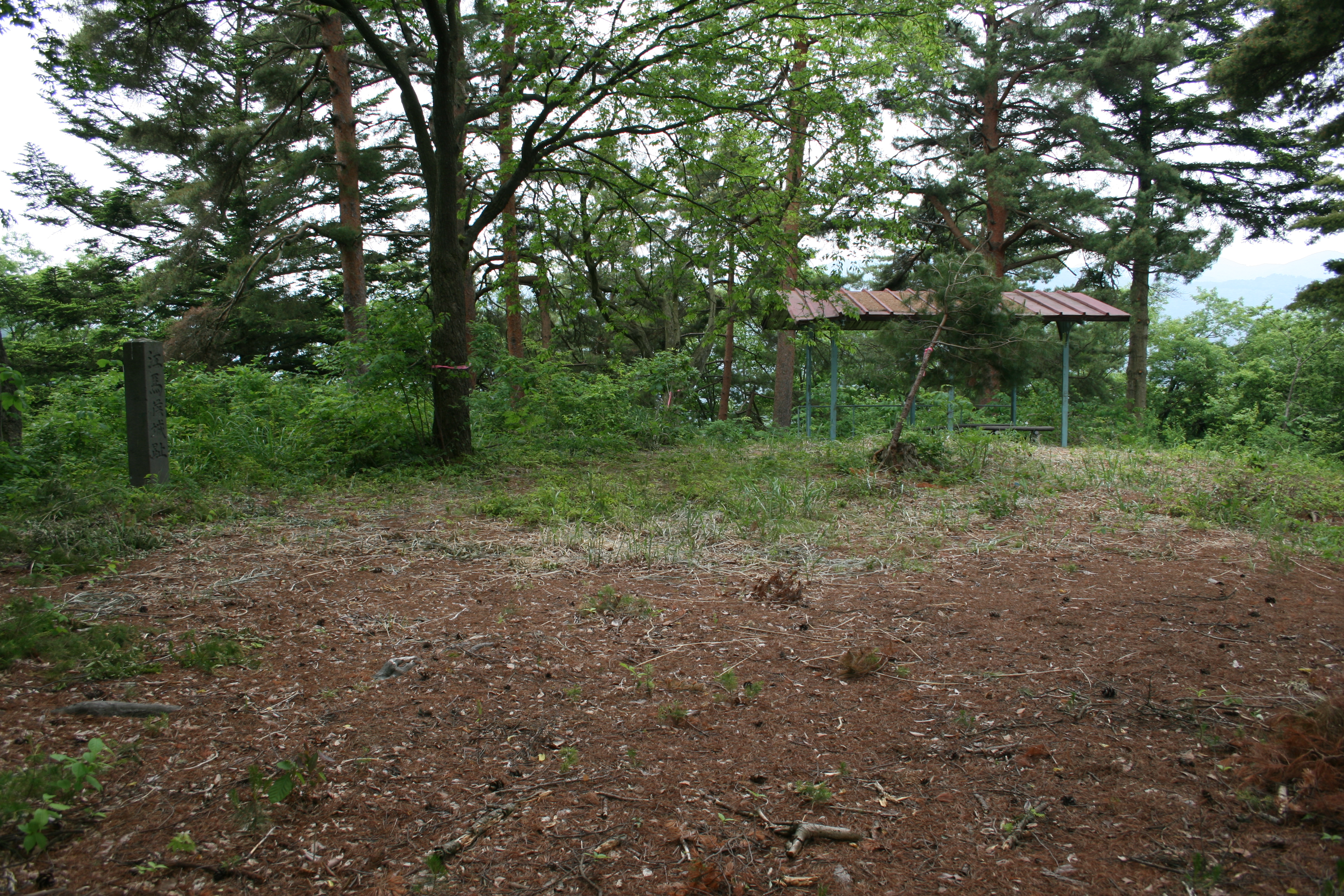
- Site of Takaharasuwa Castle

Site information
- Type: Yamashiro- style Japanese castles
- Condition: ruins

Location
- Ema clan castle sites Ema clan castle ruins (Japan)
- Coordinates: 36°24′23″N 137°17′58″E

Site history
- Built: Muromachi period
- Demolished: 1582

Ema clan castle ruins (江馬氏城館跡, Ema-shi jōkan ato) are a group of Sengoku period Japanese castles ruins located in the Kamioka neighborhood of the city of Hida, Gifu Prefecture, Japan. The ruins have been protected as a National Historic Site since 1980.

== Background ==
The Ema clan were a cadet branch of the Hōjō clan who had emerged as rulers of the northern half of Hida Province by the start of the 16th century. The southern half of the province was controlled by their rivals, the Anegakōji clan. The two clans fought in a proxy war between the Takeda clan and the Uesugi clan, with the Takeda supporting the Ema and the Uesugi supporting the more aggressive Anegakōji, who steadily made inroads on Ema territory until they were defeated in 1559. Subsequently, the Anegakōji turned to the growing power of Oda Nobunaga. Meanwhile, with the death of Takeda Shingen, the Ema clan changed their fealty to the Uesugi. However, with the death of Uesugi Kenshin in 1578, the Ema clan lost their main support. Backed by Nobunaga, the Anegakōji invaded Etchū Province, thus surrounding the Ema territories in a pincher movement. The assassination of Oda Nobunaga at the Honnō-ji Incident in 1582 gave the Ema clan what they perceived to be their last chance, and they launched a surprise attack against the Anegakōji stronghold at Kojima Castle. This was called the "Battle of Yokamachi" and the outnumbered Ema were annihilated by the harquebus-armed Anegakōji and disappear from history.

== Overview ==
As northern Hida Province has always been seen as a backwater, the various fortifications established by the Ema clan fell into ruins after the defeat of the clan and have remained in relatively good preservation to this day. Archaeological excavations have been carried out since 1974 and a number of sites were collectively designated as a National Historic Site in 1980. The most significant of these sites, the Ema clan Shimodate Yashiki, has a reconstructed gate, hall and Japanese garden and was opened to the public as Emashidateato Park in 2007.

=== Ema clan Shimodate residence ===
The Ema clan Shimodate residence (下館跡; Emashi Shimodate ato) was a fortified residence located in the Kamioka neighborhood of Hida city. It was the peacetime seat of the Ema clan, with the mountaintop Takaharasuwa Castle to the southeast as their wartime stronghold. It was a rectangular enclosure of 200 by 100 meters. It is not known when this residence was built, but it was abandoned soon after the Ema clan was destroyed in 1582 and the site of the building became paddy fields. An archaeological excavation revealed the foundations of a large residential complex of four interconnected buildings, stables, workshops in a compound which was surrounded by moats and an earthen rampart. The site also had a large Japanese garden containing many of megaliths, which was rare at the time for a clan with relatively low status. The site is now a park, with a restored gate, house and garden. It is located about 60 minutes by car from Takayama Station.

=== Takaharasuwa Castle ===
The Takaharasuwa Castle (高原諏訪城跡; Takaharasuwa-jo ato) was a yamashiro-style Japanese castle located in the Kamioka neighborhood of Hida city. It was built in the Muromachi period to be the wartime stronghold of the Ema clan, who normally resided at the Shimodate residence near the base of the 60-meter mountain. The castle is on the edge of a long and narrow ridge which spreads to the south, on the eastern side of the jōkamachi. The castle consisted of a northern and a southern stronghold, separated by a 20-meter-wide dry moat. The central enclosure measured 40 by 20 meters and was protected by clay ramparts and a combination of vertical and horizontal dry moats. These enclosures were reached by a narrow winding path overlooked by many points from which the defenders could fire down on any attackers attempting to ascend the mountain. Following the defeat of the Ema clan in 1582, the castle fell quickly to a counterattack by the Kojima clan, vassals of the Anegakōji, partly due to the fact that its defenses had been partly destroyed by a severe winter and had yet to be repaired. The ruins today consist of some remnants of the moats, clay ramparts, and outlines of some kuruwa enclosures.

=== Terabayashi Castle ===
The Terabayashi Castle (寺林城跡; Terabayashi-jo ato) was another yamashiro-style castle located in the Kamioka neighborhood of Hida city. It was also known as "Genba Castle" as it was located at the summit of Mount Gemba. The foundation of the fortification is unknown, but it overlooked the Etchū-Higashi highway, which was the primary route of invasion should the Anegakōji clan attempt to attack the Ema clan Shimodate residence.

=== Masamoto Castle ===
The Masamoto Castle (政元城跡; Masamoto-jo ato) was another yamashiro-style castle located in the western portion Kamioka neighborhood of Hida city. It was located at the summit of a mountain behind the large temple of Daikoku-ji in Hida and was intended to protect the western flank of the Ema clan Shimodate residence. It appears to have been connected with the other castles using smoke signals.

=== Hora Castle ===
The Hora Castle (洞城跡; Hora-jo ato) was another mountaintop castle and was intended to protect the eastern flank of the Ema clan Shimodate residence. It utilized natural caves near the summit of a mountain as part of its defenses. The history of this site is largely unknown.

=== Ishigami Castle ===
The Ishigami Castle (石神城跡; Ishigami-jo ato) was another mountaintop castle and was intended to protect the southeastern flank of the Ema clan Shimodate residence.

=== Tsuchi Castle ===
The Tsuchi Castle (土城跡; Tsuchi-jo ato) mountaintop castle and was intended to protect the southeastern flank of the Ema clan Shimodate residence.

== See also ==
- List of Historic Sites of Japan (Gifu)

== Literature ==
- Turnbull, Stephen (2003). Japanese Castles 1540-1640. Osprey Publishing. p. 64 pages. ISBN 1-84176-429-9.
