= Bōnotsuka Kofun =

Kofun period keyhole-shaped burial mound in Japan

Bōnozuka Kofun
- 坊の塚古墳 (Japanese)
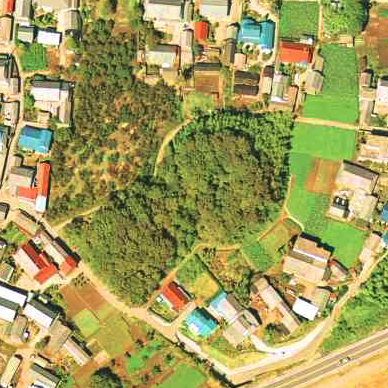
- Bōnozuka Kofun

- Bōnozuka Kofun Bōnotsuka Kofun (Japan)
- 35°24′11.33″N 136°55′31.7″E
- Type: Kofun
- Periods: Kofun period
- Location: Kakamigahara, Gifu, Japan
- Region: Kansai region

History
- Built: c.4th century

Site notes
- Public access: Yes (no facilities)
- National Historic Site of Japan

Bōnozuka Kofun (坊の塚古墳) is a Kofun period keyhole-shaped burial mound, located in the Unuma Haba-cho neighborhood of the city of Kakamigahara, Gifu in the Chubu region of Japan. The tumulus was designated a National Historic Site of Japan in 2024. It is the second largest kofun in Gifu Prefecture.

== Overview ==
The Bōnozuka Kofun is a zenpō-kōen-fun (前方後円墳), which is shaped like a keyhole, having one square end and one circular end, when viewed from above. It is located on the eastern edge of the Kakamigahara Plateau in southern Gifu Prefecture. Nine tumuli, including this one, are known to have been built in Unuma Haba-cho. It has been the victim of grave robberies in the Sengoku period, as well as in 1886 and 1902, and a survey to confirm the area of the moat was conducted in 1992. The burial mound was excavated in 2015. The tumulus is orientated to the southwest and has a total length of 120 meters, not including its surrounding moat. The mound was constructed in three-tiers. The posterior circular portion has a diameter of 72 meters and height of 11.5 meters. The rectangular anterior portion has a width of 66 meters and height of 8.5 meters. Fukiishi roofing stones were found on the surface of the tumulus; however, no haniwa were found on the first or second tiers and a single row of cylindrical haniwa was found only on the top tier. The burial facility is a vertical pit stone burial chamber in the center of the rear mound. It contained a stone coffin located slightly northwest of the center of the mound, and its main axis runs northeast-southwest, parallel to the main axis of the mound. The full dimensions of the stone coffin are unclear, but it measures at least 6 meters long and 1.5 meters wide, making it a large stone coffin for the time period. Despite previous robberies, grave goods such as stone products , magatama and tubular beads have been excavated from inside the burial chamber, which confirm the construction date is around the end of the 4th century, at the beginning of the middle Kofun period.

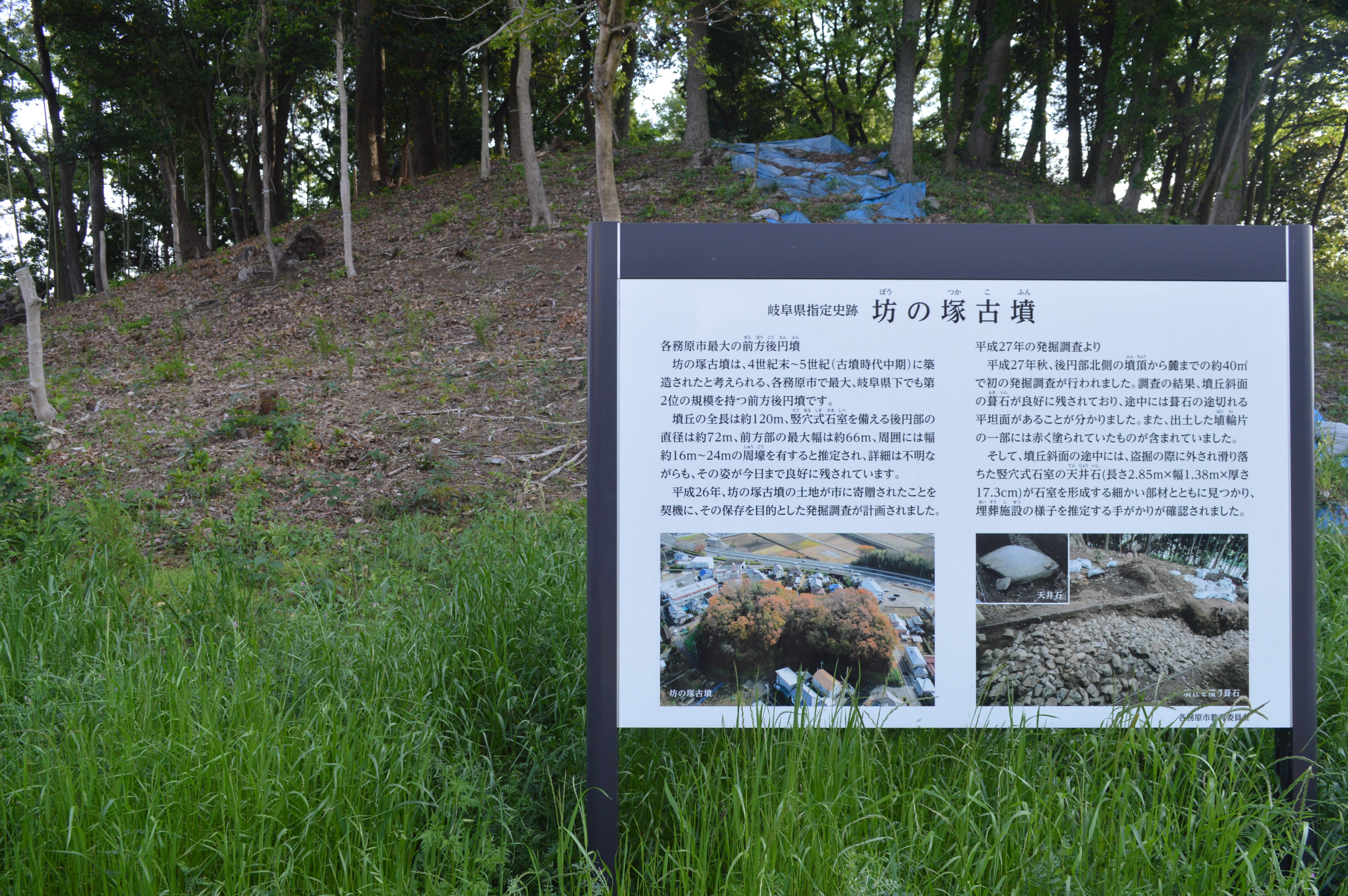
Bōnozuka Kofun

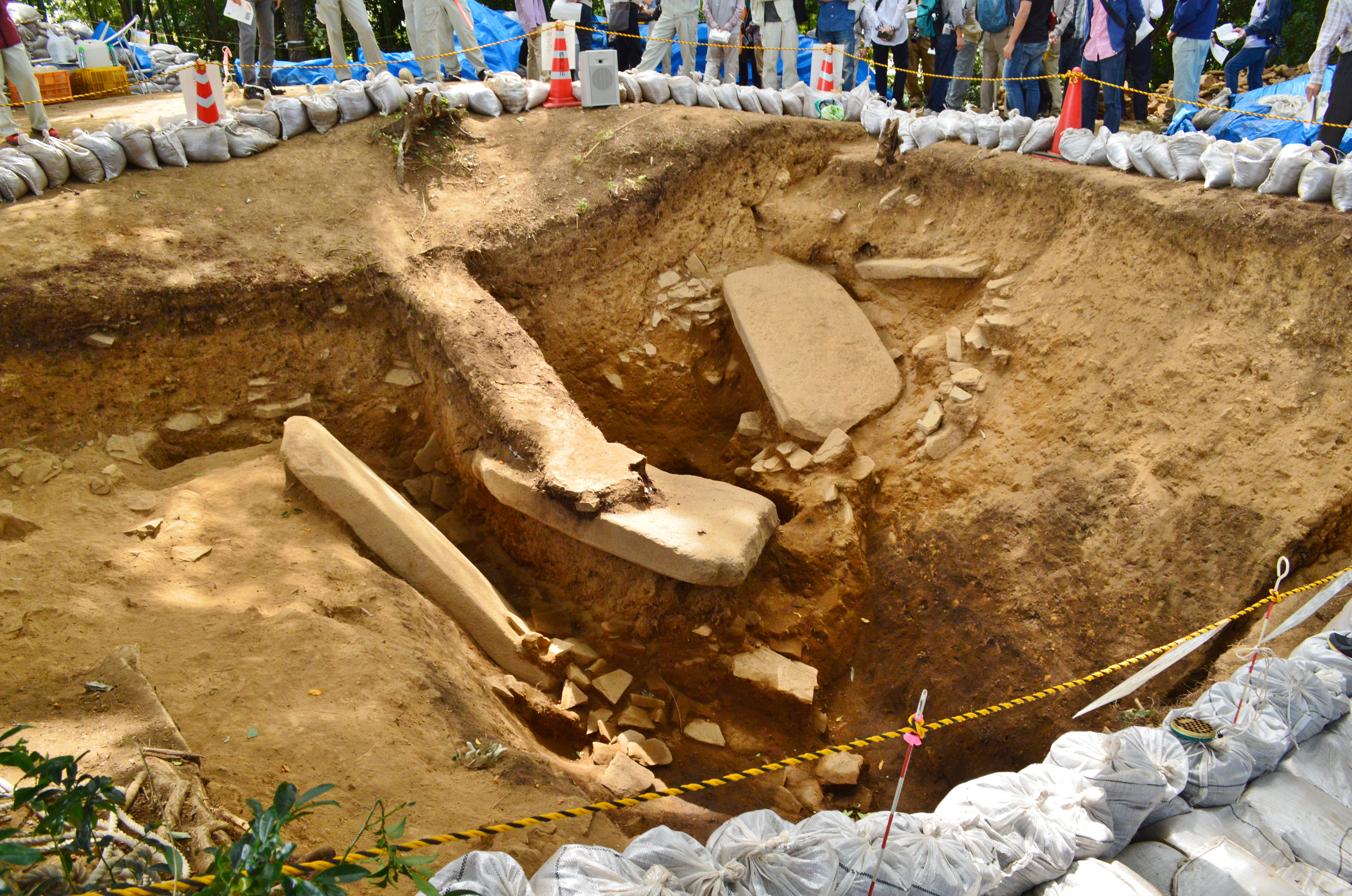
Excavation of the burial chamber

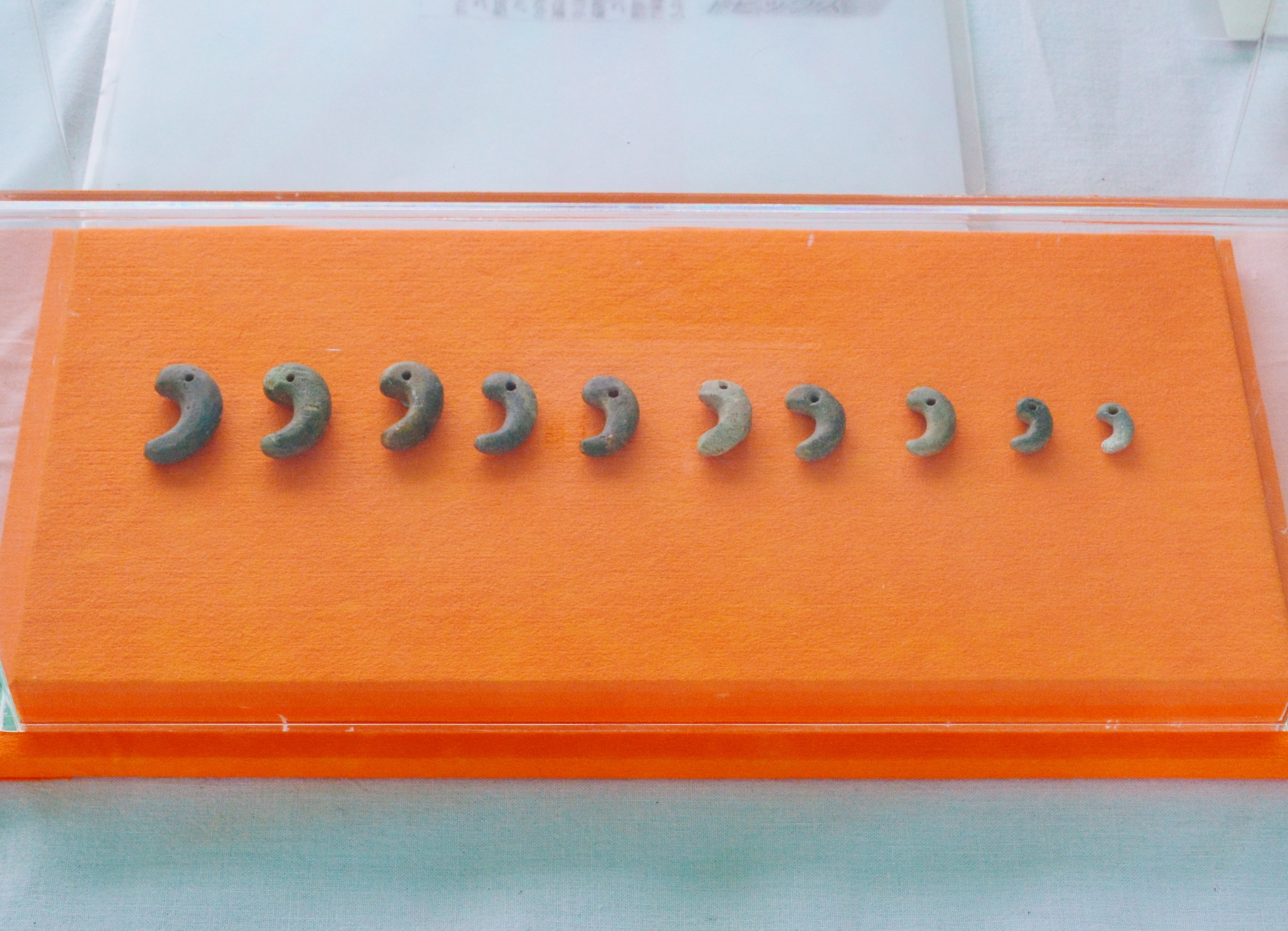
Magatama found at the Bōnozuka Kofun

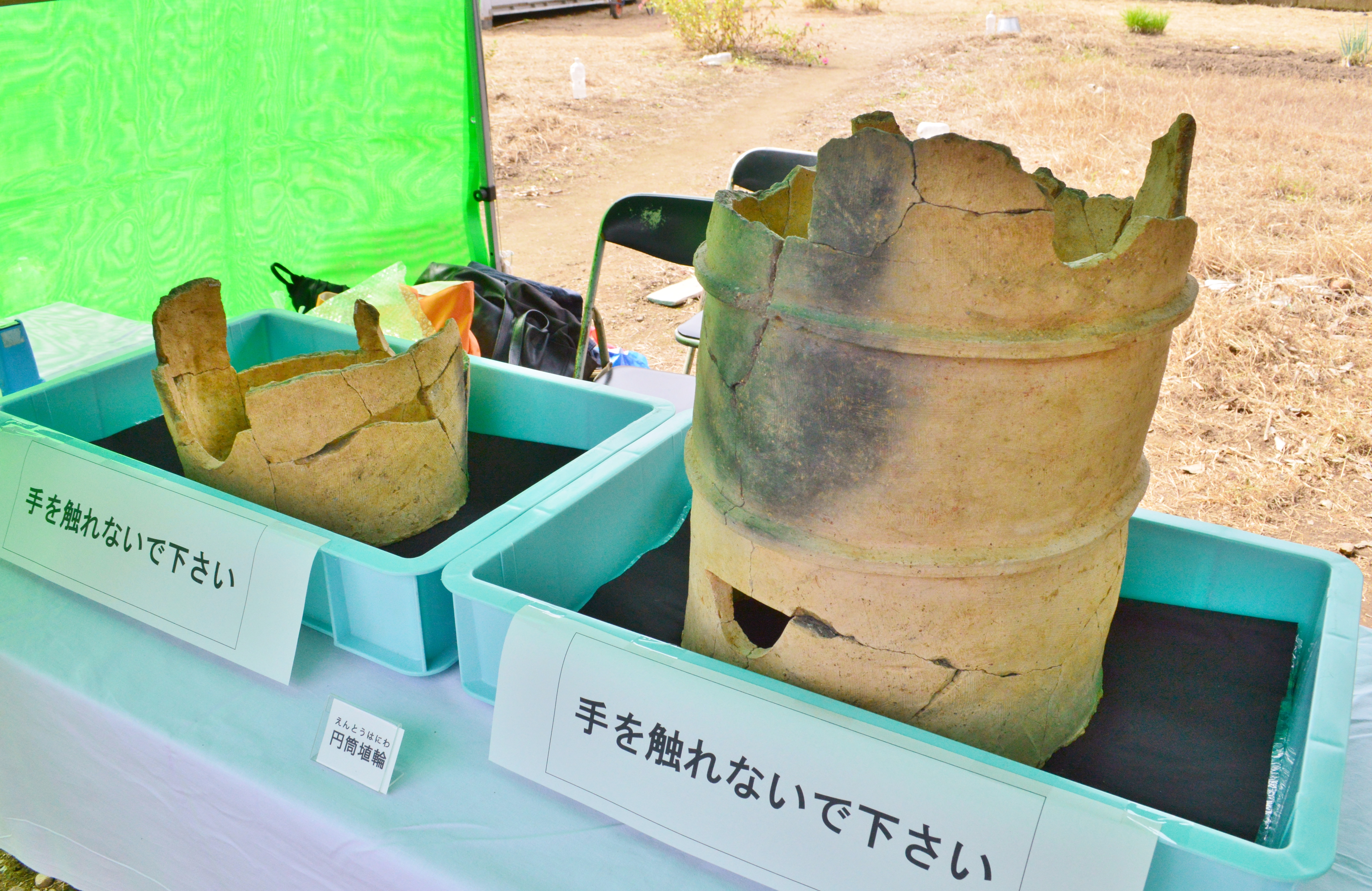
Haniwa found at the Bōnozuka Kofun

The tumulus is about 600 meters northeast of Haba Station on the Meitetsu Kakamigahara Line.

== See also ==
- List of Historic Sites of Japan (Gifu)
