= Kotozuka Kofun =

Kofun burial mound in Japan

- 琴塚古墳 (Japanese)
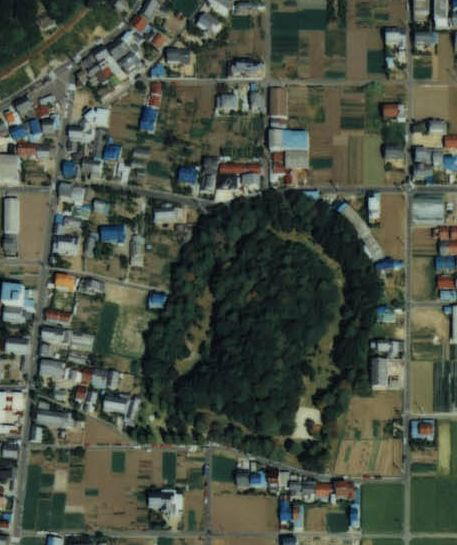
- Kotozuka Kofun

- Kotozuka Kofun Kotozuka Kofun (Japan)
- 35°25′05″N 136°48′52″E
- Type: kofun
- Periods: Kofun period
- Location: Gifu, Gifu, Japan
- Region: Chūbu region

History
- Built: 5th century AD

Site notes
- Public access: Yes (no public facilities)

The Kotozuka Kofun (琴塚古墳) is akofun burial mound located in the Kotozuka neighborhood of the city of Gifu, Gifu Prefecture, in the Chūbu region of Japan. The site was designated a National Historic Site of Japan in 1934. It is the third largest in Gifu Prefecture.

== Overview ==
The Kotozuka Kofun is a zenpō-kōen-fun (前方後円墳), which is shaped like a keyhole, having one square end and one circular end, when viewed from above. It is located on a river terrace of the Kiso River near the border of the city of Gifu with the city of Kakamigahara. It is the only survivor of the Kotozuka cluster of kofun, which once had many keyhole-shaped tumuli, all of which have now been destroyed by urban encroachment. The tumulus is a three-tier structure with a total length of 115 meters. The posterior circular portion is 69 meters in diameter, with a height of 10.5 meters, and the anterior rectangular portion has a width of 74.4 meters and a height of 7.5 meters. The tumulus was surrounded by a double moat. The inner moat is mostly intact and has a width of 18 to 20 meters. The outer moat has largely been filled in, but surviving portions in the northwest and east have a width of 7.2 meters, with 10.5 meters separating the moats.

Fukiishi and cylindrical haniwa have been found on the outside of the tumulus, and grave goods included bronze mirrors, magatama beads, stone spearheads and arrowheads. These artifacts and the construction style of tumulus dates the site to the 5th century AD. According to local legend, the tumulus is the tomb of the concubine of the semi-legendary Emperor Keikō, Igoto-hime-no-mikoto (五十琴姫命).

== See also ==
- List of Historic Sites of Japan (Gifu)
