= Tōson Memorial Museum =

Museum in Magome-juku, Gifu Prefecture, Japan

- 藤村記念館
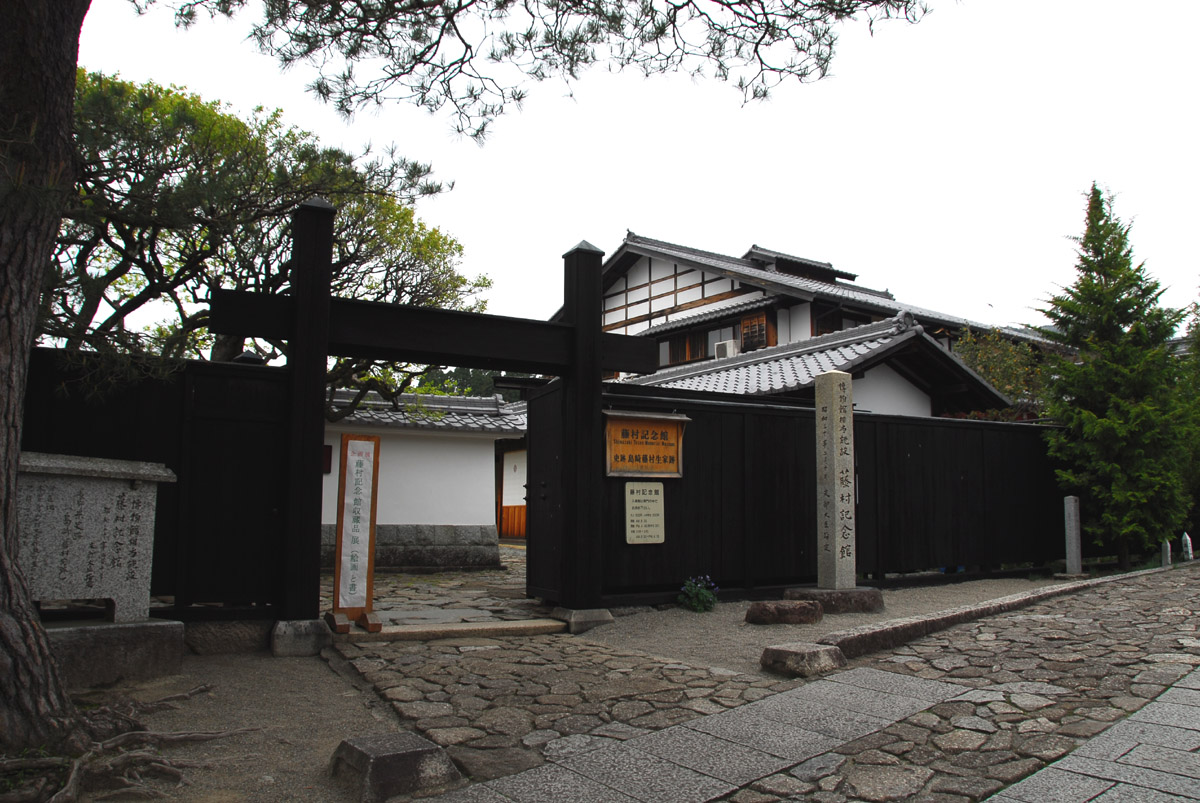

General information
- Location: 4256-1 Magome, Nakatsugawa, Gifu Prefecture, Japan
- Coordinates: 35°31′37″N 137°34′02″E
- Opened: 1952

Design and construction
- Architect: Taniguchi Yoshirō

Website
- Official website

Tōson Memorial Museum (藤村記念館, Tōson Kinenkan) is a museum in Magome-juku, Nakatsugawa, Gifu Prefecture, Japan dedicated to the life and works of Shimazaki Tōson. The writer was born in the former Honjin in 1872, but his birthplace and childhood home was mostly destroyed in the conflagration of 1895. Rebuilt to designs by Taniguchi Yoshirō in 1947, the museum opened in 1952. The core of the collection comprises some 5,000 items donated by Shimazaki Tōson's eldest son.

== See also ==
- List of Historic Sites of Japan (Gifu)
- Kiso Valley
- Nakasendō
- Before the Dawn
