= Shōge temple ruins =

Archaeological site in Gifu, Japan

- 正家廃寺
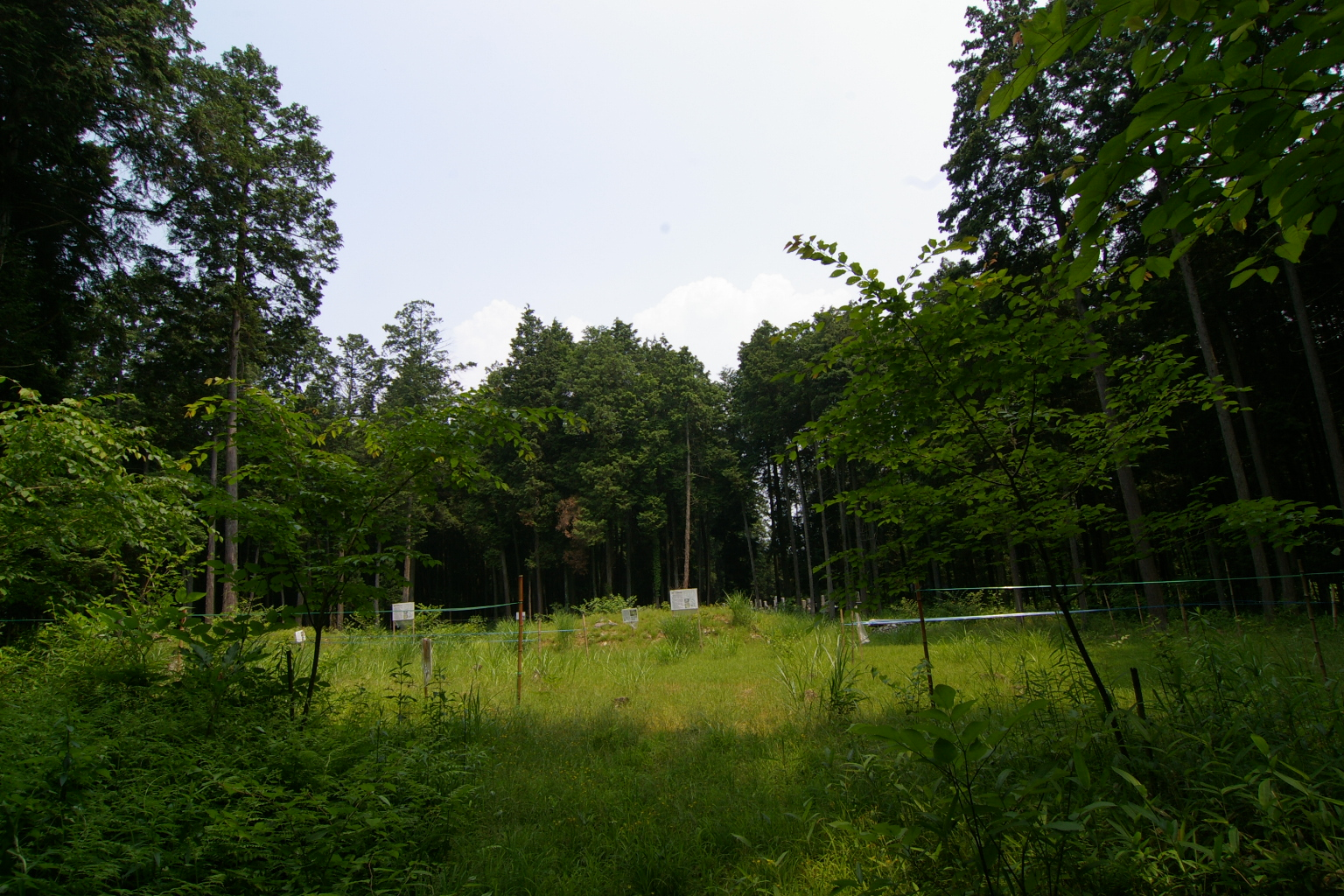
- Site of Shōge temple ruins

- Shōge temple ruins Shōge temple ruins (Japan)

Religion
- Affiliation: Buddhism

Location
- Location: Ena-shi, Gifu-ken
- Country: Japan
- Coordinates: 35°26′19″N 137°25′01″E

The Shōge temple ruins (正家廃寺跡, Shōge Haiji ato) is an archaeological site with the ruins of a late Hakuhō to early Heian period Buddhist temple located in the Osashima neighborhood of the city of Ena, Gifu, Japan. The temple no longer exists, but the temple grounds were designated as a National Historic Site in 2001.

== History ==
The Shōge temple ruins are located on a hill at the southern edge of the Ena Basin in eastern Gifu Prefecture at an elevation of 325 meters. Although the ruins of an abandoned temple have long been known to exist, there is no mention of the site in historic literature. The Ena City Board of Education commissioned an archaeological excavation to Nanzan University from 1977 to 1979 and again from 1993 to 1999. The survey found the foundations of several buildings and many pottery shards, from which the ruin was dated to the first half of the 8th century. The temple compound measured 110 meters east-to-west by 70 meters north-to-south, and the structures consisted of a Kondō, Lecture Hall, Pagoda, rectory, cloister, and several smaller structures in a layout almost identical to that of Hōryū-ji in Ikaruga, Nara. No roof tiles were found, indicating that these buildings pre-dated the use of tiled roofs. Also, the layout and design of the main hall was also highly unusual, with the pillars of the eaves arranged radially with respect to the main building. The only other structure known to have a similar arrangement yet discovered is the ruins of the Tamamushi Shrine at Asuka, Nara. Two pit dwellings were also identified, one of which may have been a smithy. A large quantity of Sue ware pottery shards was also recovered from the site.

The temple appears to have gone into decline after a fire in the 9th century and to have disappeared by the early 10th century.

The foundation of the temple may be connected with the establishment of Ena District government administrative complex, which also occurred in the first have of the eighth century.

The site is located about 1.6 km south of Ena Station on the JR East Chūō Main Line, but as the site was backfilled after excavation, there are no public facilities.

== See also ==
- List of Historic Sites of Japan (Gifu)
