= Hiruiōzuka Kofun =

Ancient burial mounds in Ōgaki, Japan

- 昼飯大塚古墳 (Japanese)
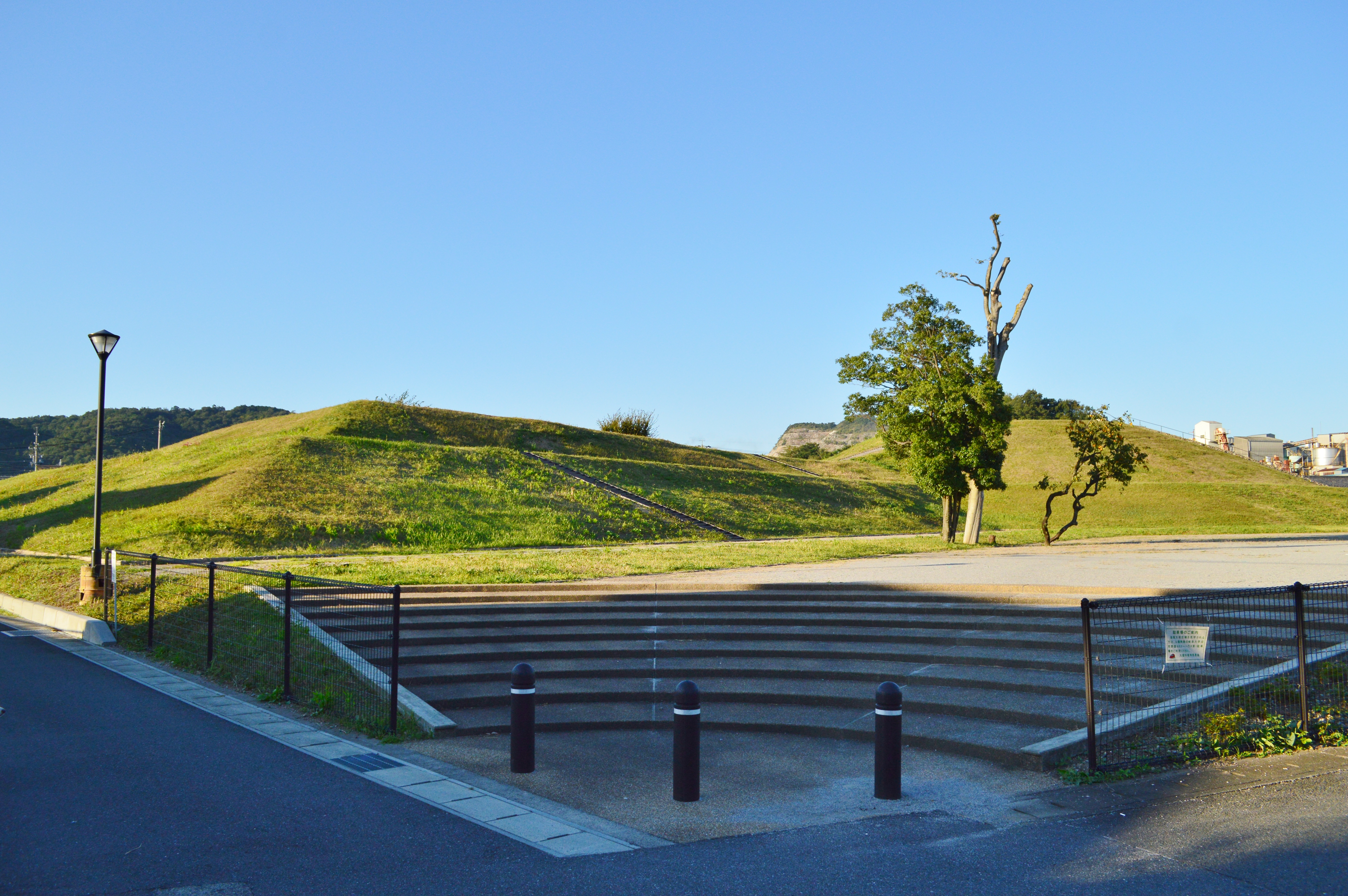
- Hiruiōzuka Kofun

- Hiruiōzuka Kofun Hiruiōzuka Kofun (Japan)
- 35°23′14″N 136°34′17″E
- Type: kofun
- Periods: Kofun period
- Location: Ōgaki, Gifu, Japan
- Region: Chubu region

History
- Built: mid 4th century AD

Site notes
- Public access: Yes (park)

The Hiruiōzuka Kofun (昼飯大塚古墳) is a kofun burial mound located in what is now part of the city of Ōgaki, Gifu in the Chubu region of Japan. The site was designated a National Historic Site of Japan in 2000.

== Overview ==
The Hiruiōzuka Kofun is a zenpō-kōen-fun (前方後円墳), which is shaped like a keyhole, having one square end and one circular end, when viewed from above. It is the largest keyhole-shaped tumuli in Gifu Prefecture and dates from the mid-4th century. It is located on the Makino plateau at an elevation of 25 meters.

The tumulus is a three-tiered structure, orientated to the southwest and has an overall length of 150 meters. The bottom tier of the structure and its surrounding moat are now underground due to generations of agricultural activity in the area. The site is also being encroached upon by residential housing developments. It was first excavated in 1980 by Nagoya University and was found to contain three separate burial chambers, one with a stone sarcophagus in the north, one with a clay sarcophagus in the south and one with a wooden coffin in the west. The stone sarcophagus had been looted in the Meiji period, and the clay sarcophagus was not excavated. The burial chamber with wooden coffin was found to contain many grave goods, including iron and steel swords, tools made from iron, along with jade balls, magatama, glass ornaments and Haji ware pottery fragments. The inside of the coffin was not excavated. Haniwa recovered from the site was in various forms, including cylindrical-shaped haniwa, and haniwa in the shape of houses, human figures and in the form of tools and shields.

The kofun has been restored to what archaeologists believe to be its original appearance, covered in fukiishi with haniwa and the moat was also restored, forming an archaeological park. The site is a three-minute walk from the "Akasaka Sōgō Center" on the Meihan Kintetsu Bus from Ogaki Station on the JR East Tōkaidō Main Line.

- Total length: 150 meters
- Posterior circular portion: 99 meters diameter x 12 meters high
- Anterior rectangular portion: 80 meters wide x 9.5 meters high

== Gallery ==
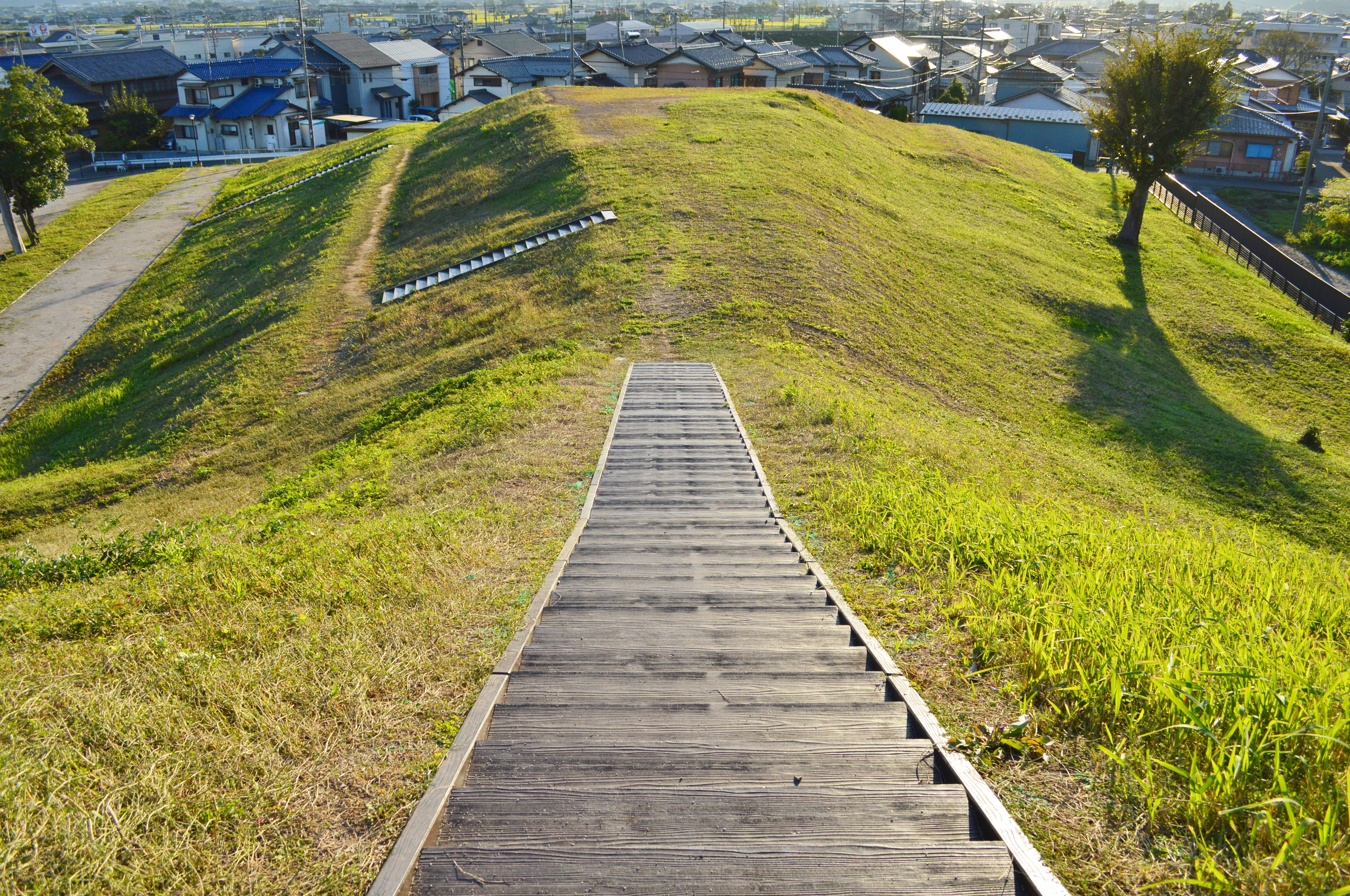
top view

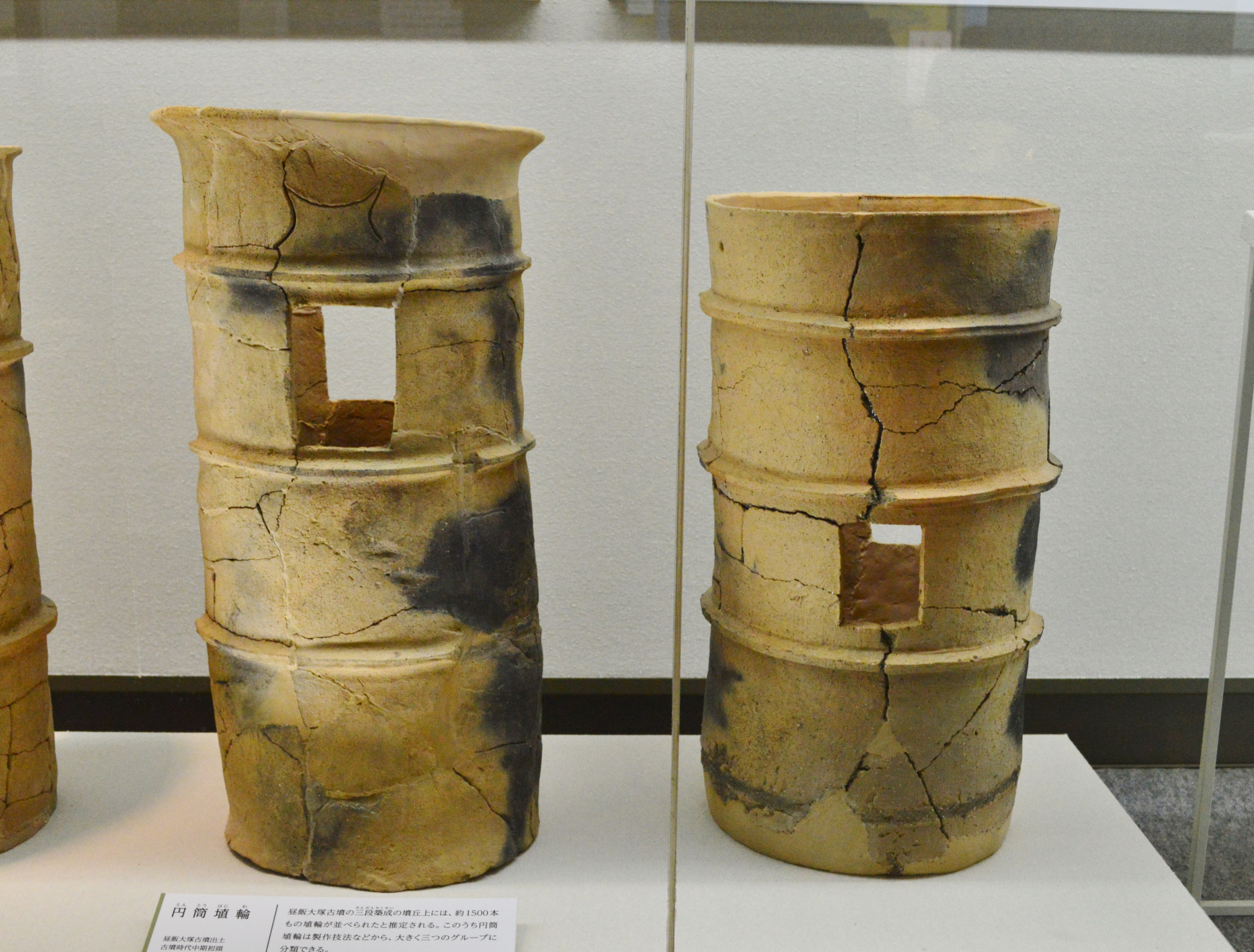
Haniwa

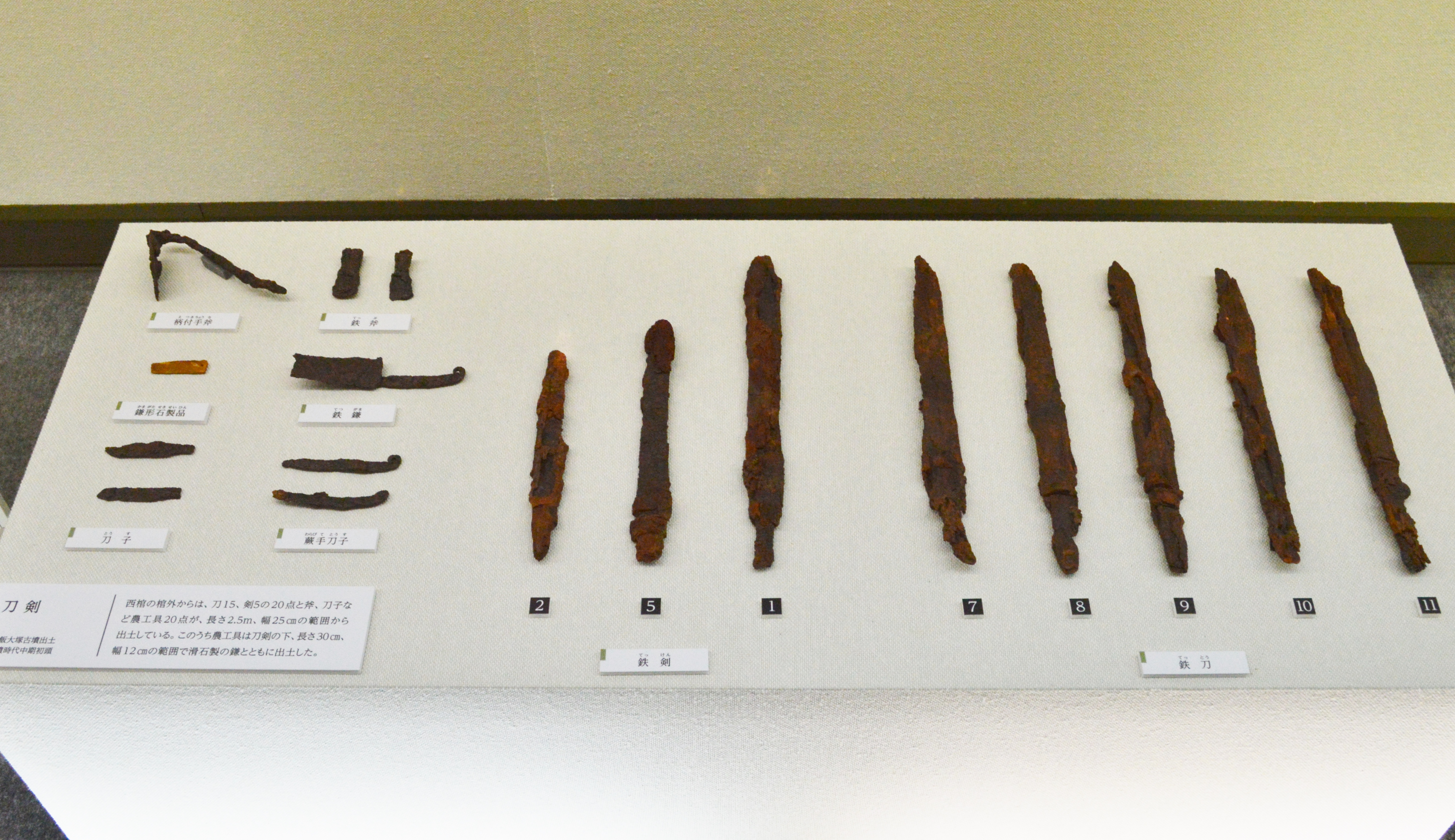
iron swords

== See also ==
- List of Historic Sites of Japan (Gifu)
