= Nagatsuka Kofun =

- 長塚古墳 (Japanese)
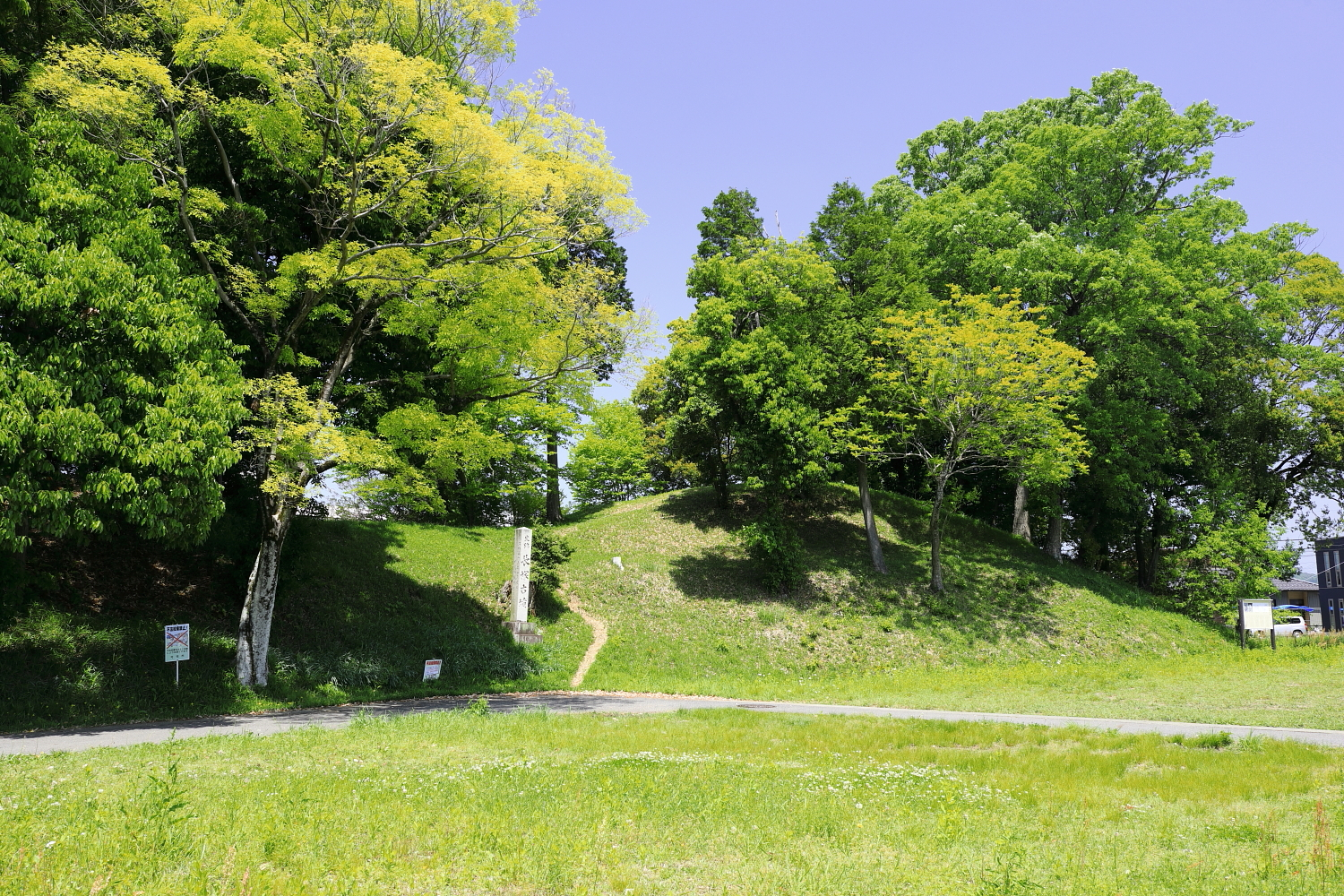
- Nagatsuka Kofun

- Nagatsuka Kofun Nagatsuka Kofun (Japan)
- 35°25′52″N 137°04′07″E
- Type: kofun
- Periods: Kofun period
- Location: Kani, Gifu, Japan
- Region: Chubu region

History
- Built: late 4th century AD

Site notes
- Public access: Yes (no facilities)

The Nagatsuka Kofun (長塚古墳) is a kofun burial mound located in the Nakaedo neighborhood of the city of Kani, Gifu in the Chubu region of Japan. The tumulus was designated a National Historic Site of Japan in 1956, with the area under protection extended in 2003.

== Overview ==
The Nagatsuka Kofun is a zenpō-kōen-fun (前方後円墳), which is shaped like a keyhole, having one square end and one circular end, when viewed from above. The tumulus is constructed in two-tiers and is located at an elevation of 10 meters on a river terrace between the Kiso River and its tributary, the Kanogawa River. It is the largest of the Maenami cluster of 15 tumuli in the same area. It was excavated by the Kani City Department of Education in 1982, 1986 and from 1995 to 1997. The tumulus was found to be 81 meters long, with a posterior circular portion 46 meters in diameter, 8.3 meters high, and a 25 meter wide by 5.9 meter high anterior rectangular portion. Neither fukiishi or haniwa were discovered, but the tumulus had traces of a five-meter wide moat on its south and east sides.

The tumulus was estimated to be from the latter half of the 4th century based on its construction style. This was confirmed by the grave goods found within the burial chambers, one of which was located in the anterior and one in the posterior portions of the mound. The grave goods included bronze mirrors, glass balls, Sue ware pottery, and fragments of a wooden coffin.

The excavated relics are exhibited at the Kani Local History Museum (可児郷土歴史館, Kani Kyōdo Rekishikan). The tumulus is located about a 10-minute walk from Kani Station on the JR East Taita Line.

== Gallery ==
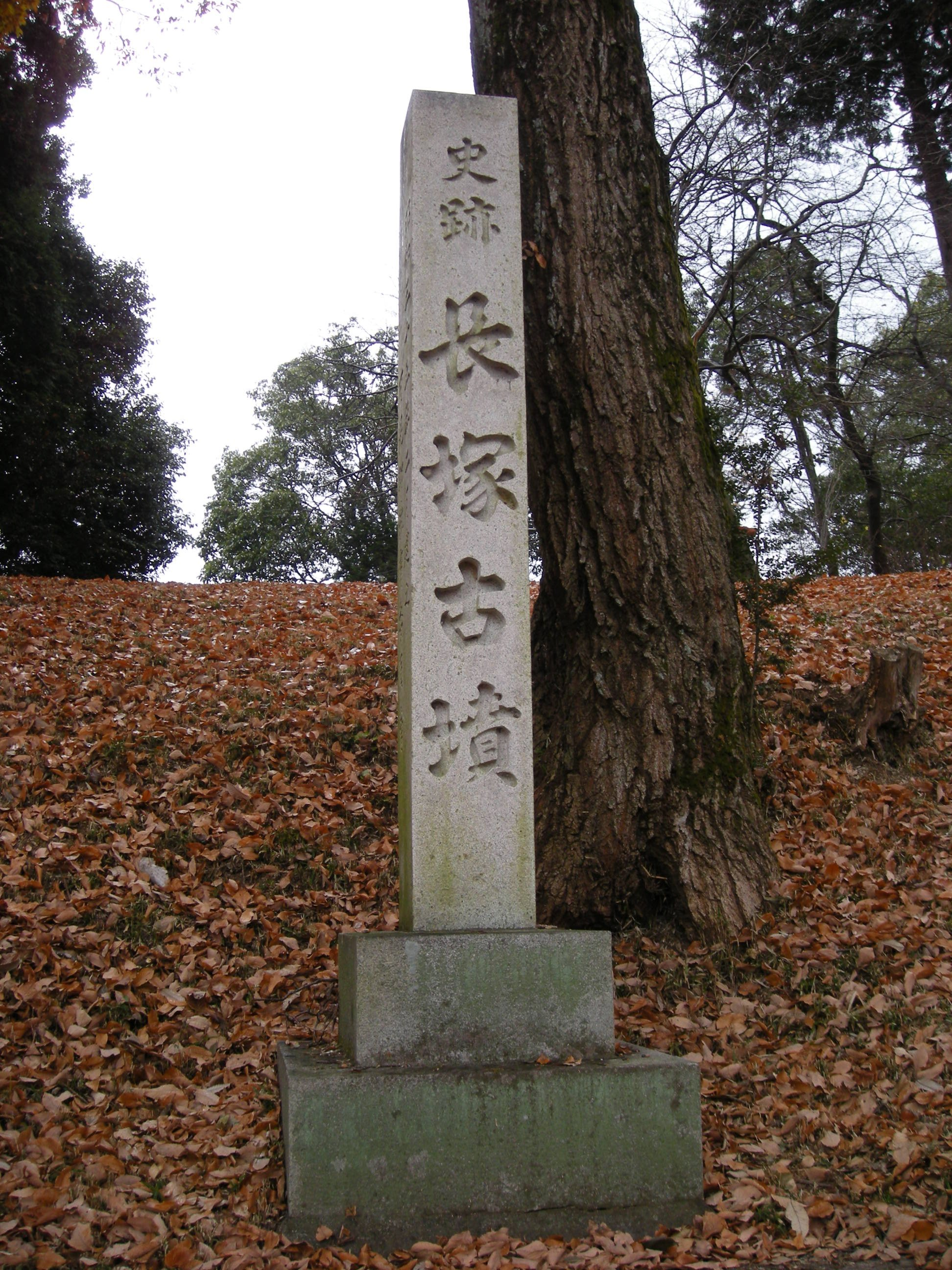
Marker

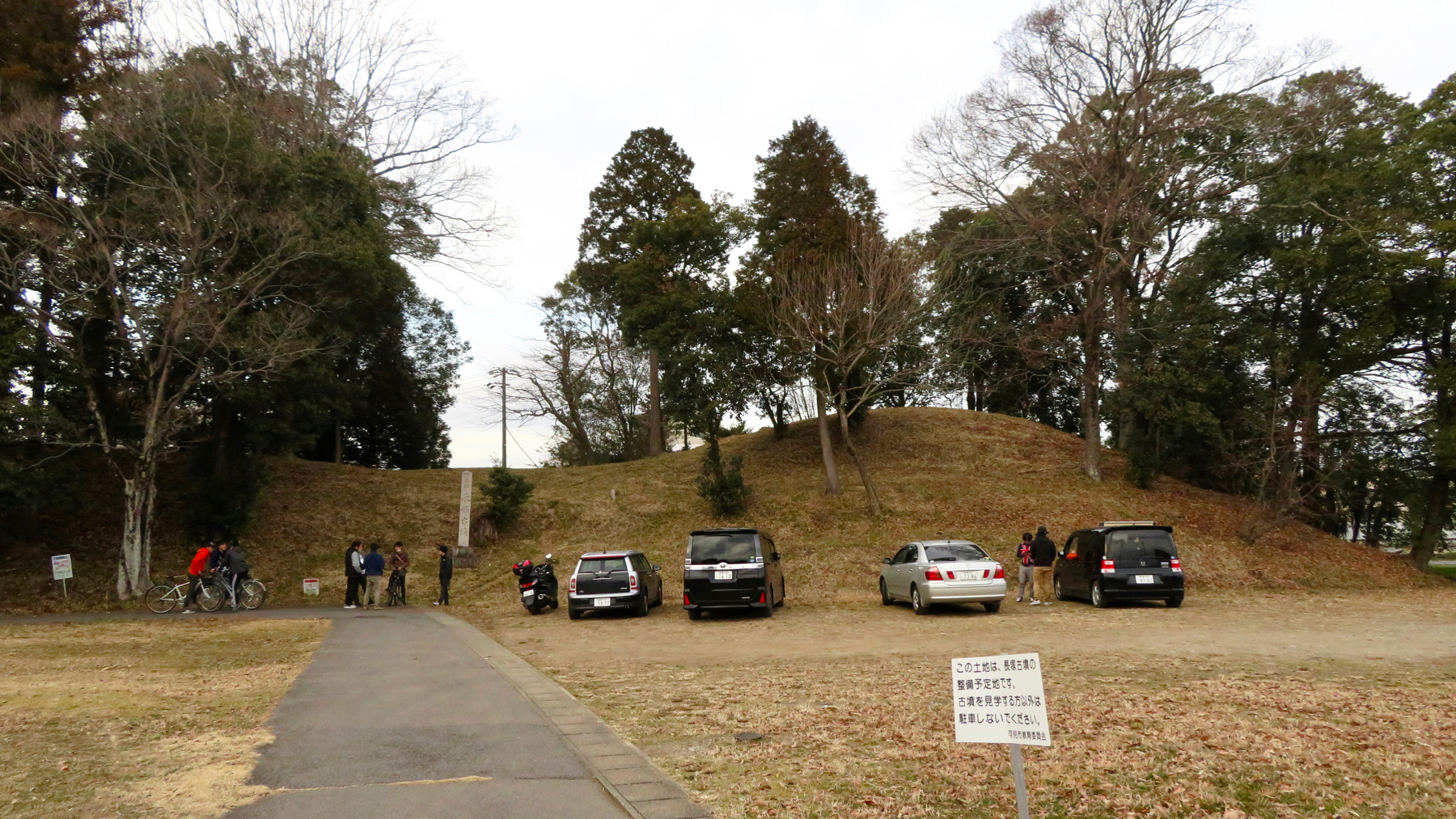
side view

== See also ==
- List of Historic Sites of Japan (Gifu)
