= Matsukura Castle (Hida Province) =

Castle in Takayama, Gifu prefecture, Japan

Coordinates: 36°07′34″N 137°14′03″E

Matsukura Castle (松倉城, Matsukura-jō) was a castle in Takayama, Gifu Prefecture, Japan (formerly Hida Province). It was built by, and ruled from, by Yasutane Shiina during the 16th century.

== Outline ==
The castle was built on Mount Matsukura (松倉山 Matsukura-yama), which is in the southwestern area of the present-day Takayama. Though the mountain is 857 m (2,812 ft), its prominence is only 360 m (1,181 ft). While only the stone foundation surrounding the castle remains today, and the site was designated an Important Cultural Asset by the prefecture in 1956.
