= Ai River (Gifu) =

Coordinates: 35°19′35.98″N 136°35′15.29″E

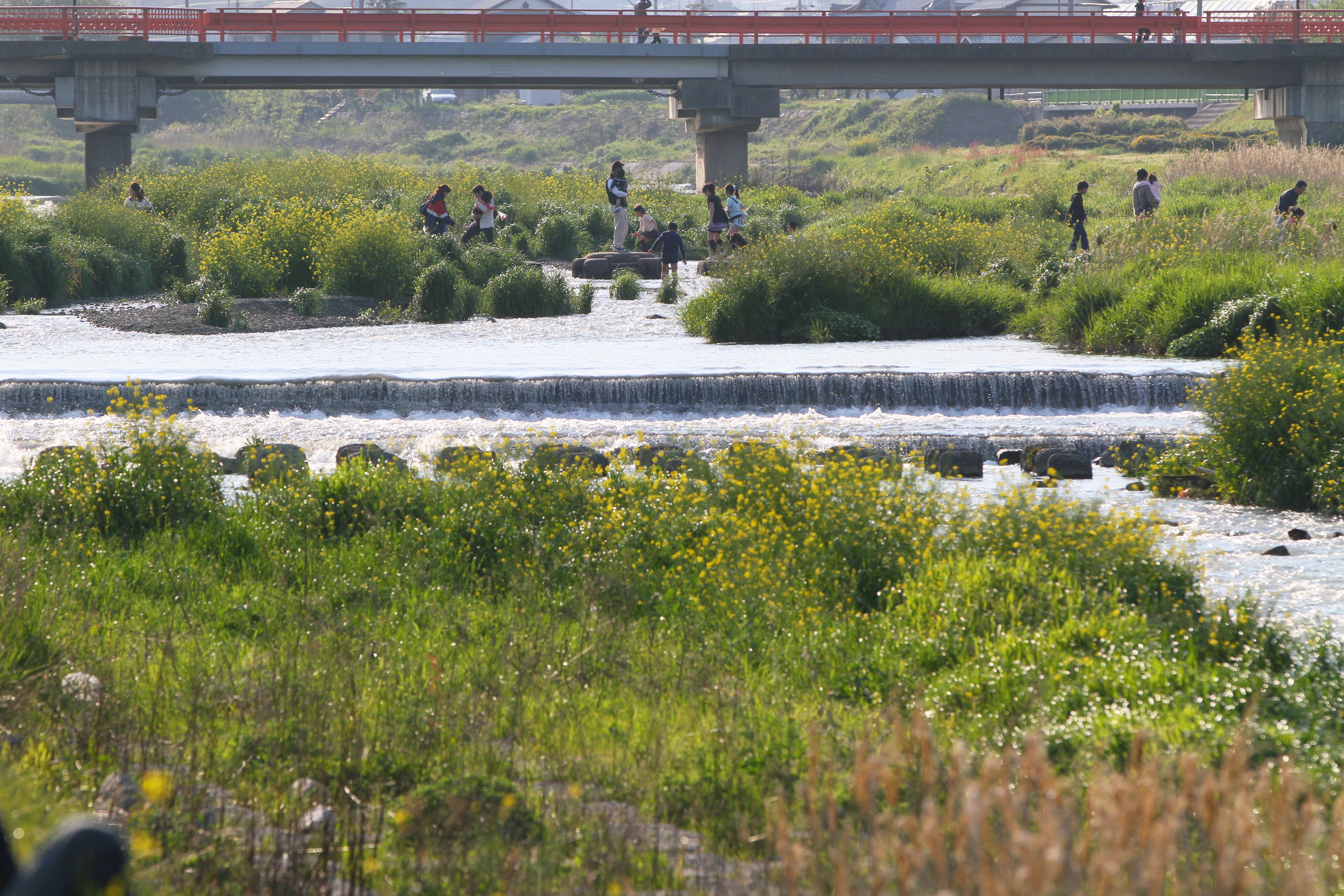

- Native name: 相川 (Japanese)

Location
- Country: Japan

Physical characteristics
- Source
  - location: Sekigahara
- Mouth
  - location: Kuise River
- Length: 18.1 km (11.2 mi)

Basin features
- River system: Kiso River

The Ai River (相川, Ai-kawa) is a river in Japan which has its source in the city of Sekigahara, Gifu Prefecture. It drains into the Kuise River, and ultimately flows into the Kiso River.

== History ==
The river originates near Mount Ibuki in the northern part of Sekigahara and flows through central Tarui. The post town of Tarui-juku, a stop along the old Nakasendō trading route, used to sit along the banks of the river.

== River communities ==
The river passes through or forms the boundary of Sekigahara, Tarui, Ōgaki, and Yōrō in Gifu Prefecture.
