= Kuise River =

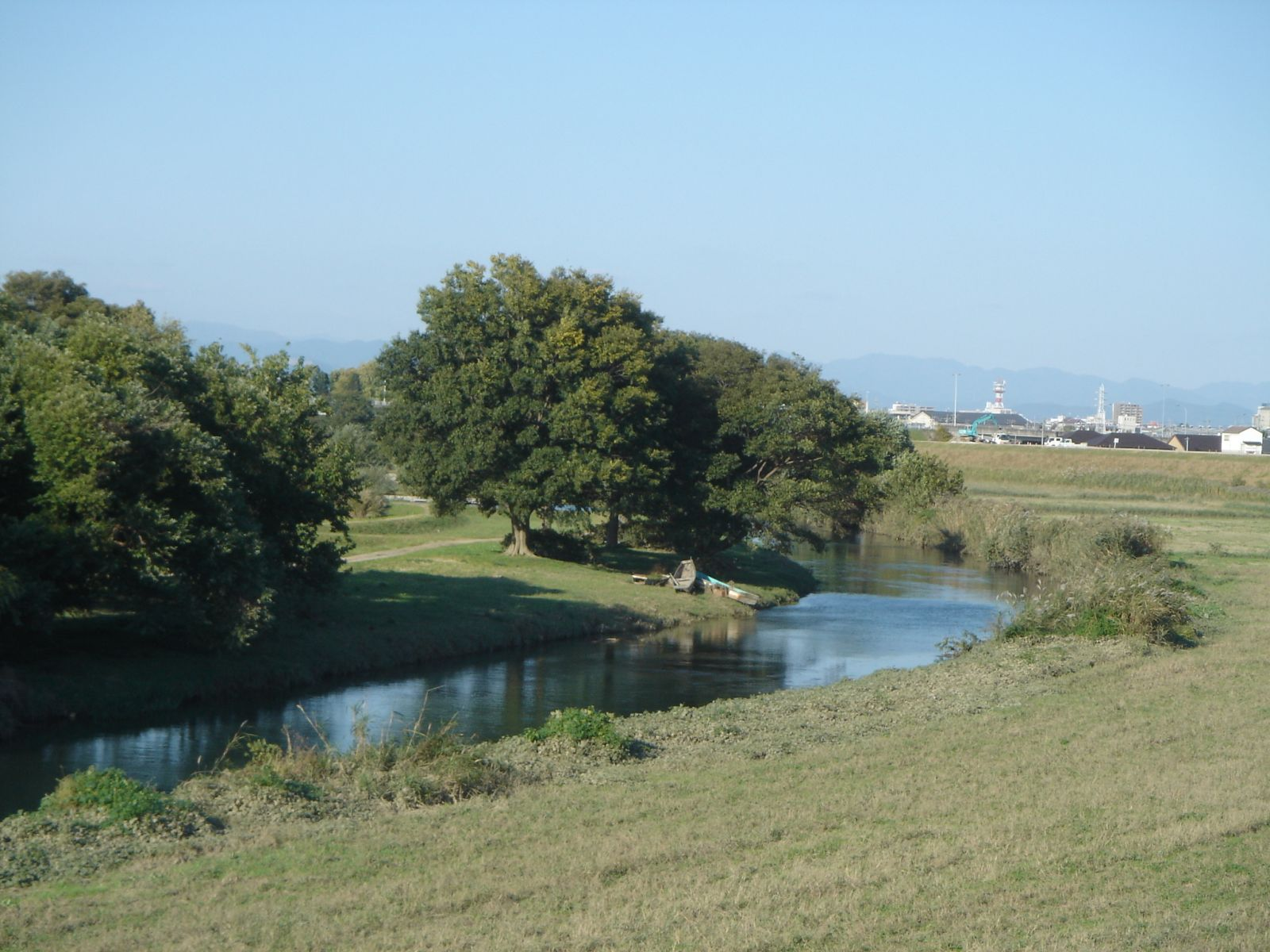

- Native name: 杭瀬川 (Japanese)

Location
- Country: Japan

Physical characteristics
- Source
  - location: Mount Ikeda
  - elevation: 924 m (3,031 ft)
- Mouth
  - location: Makita River
- Length: 23.8 km (14.8 mi)

Basin features
- River system: Kiso River

The Kuise River (杭瀬川, Kuise-gawa) is a river in Japan which has its source on Mount Ikeda in Gifu Prefecture. It drains into the Makita River, which ultimately flows into the Kiso River.

== River communities ==
The river passes through or forms the boundary of Ikeda, Ōgaki, Yōrō, and Wanouchi in Gifu Prefecture.
