= Siege of Takehana =

- Part of the Sengoku period
Date	1584
Location	Takehana fortress, Ise Province 35°19′00″N 136°42′00″E
Result	Hideyoshi victory
Territorial changes	Takehana falls to Hideyoshi

Belligerents
forces of Toyotomi Hideyoshi	Takehana garrison

Commanders and leaders
Toyotomi Hideyoshi	Unknown
- Location within Gifu Prefecture Siege of Takehana (Japan)

The 1584 siege of Takehana was something of a follow-up to the siege of Kaganoi; the great warlord Toyotomi Hideyoshi sought to consolidate his power, particularly in the lands of his late lord Oda Nobunaga.

== History ==
Hideyoshi employed the same tactics at Takehana as at Kaganoi, diverting the Kiso River with a dam and flooding the fortress.
