= Makita River =

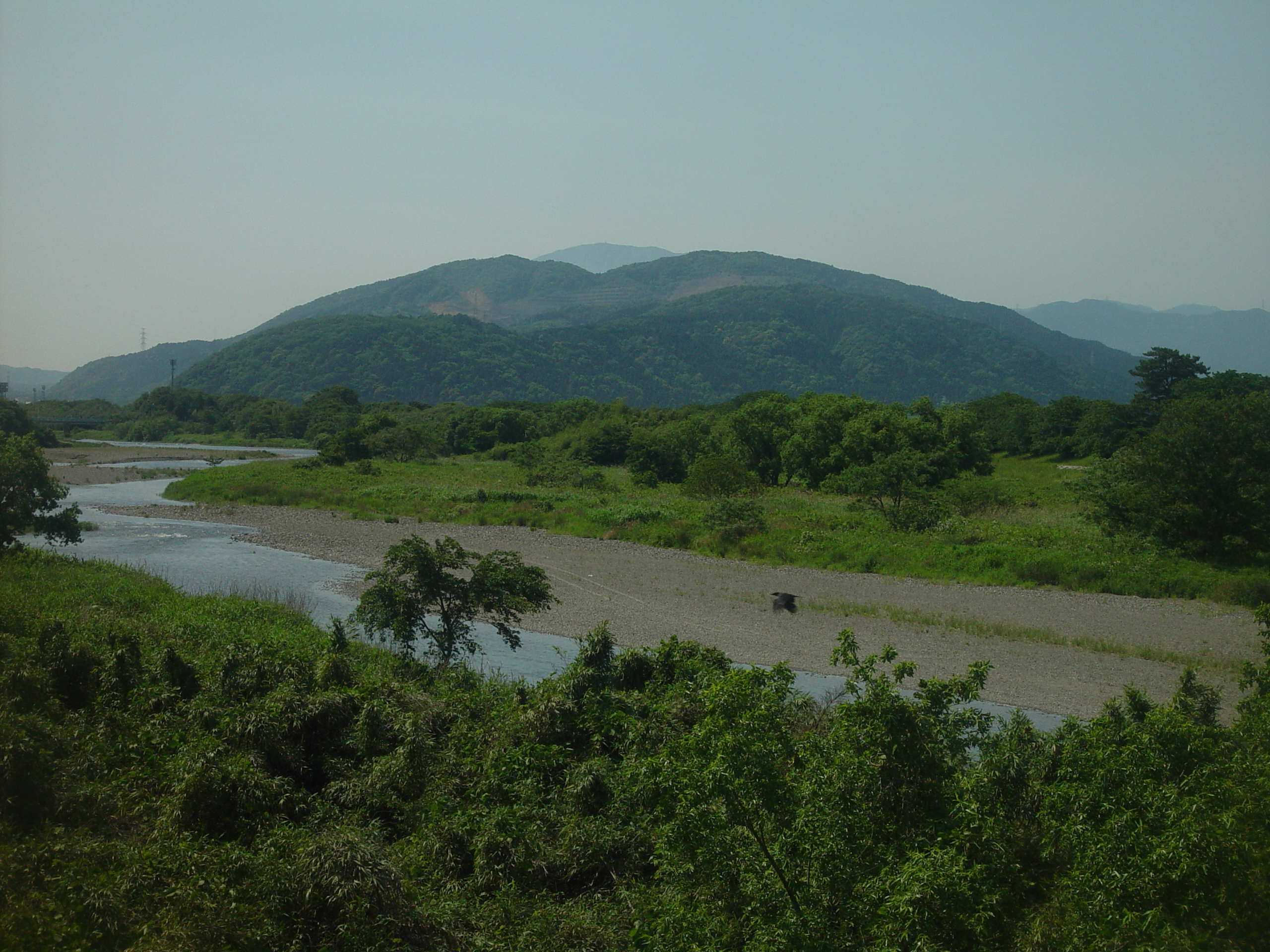
- River and Mount Nangū

- Native name: 牧田川 (Japanese)

Location
- Country: Japan

Physical characteristics
- Source
  - location: Gosō Pass
- Mouth
  - location: Ibi River
- Length: 41.1 km (25.5 mi)
- Basin size: 392.7 km^{2} (151.6 sq mi)

Basin features
- River system: Kiso River

The Makita River (牧田川, Makita-gawa) is a river in Japan which empties into the Ibi River in Gifu Prefecture. It which ultimately flows into the Kiso River.

== River communities ==
The river passes through or forms the boundary of Ōgaki, Yōrō, and Wanouchi.
