= Nōbi Plain =

Plain in Chūbū, Japan

Coordinates: 35.25°N 136.833°E

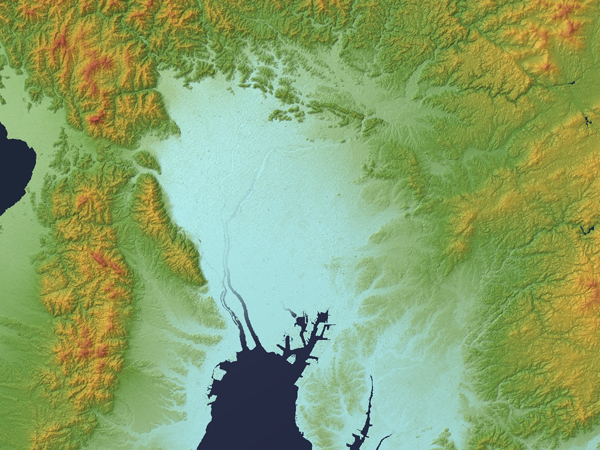
Relief map

The Nōbi Plain (濃尾平野, Nōbi Heiya) is a large plain in Japan that stretches from the Mino area of southwest Gifu Prefecture to the Owari area of northwest Aichi Prefecture and extreme northern Mie Prefecture, covering an area of approximately 1,800 square kilometres (695 sq mi). It is an alluvial plain created by the Kiso Three Rivers (the Ibi, Kiso and Nagara rivers) and has very fertile soil. It is bordered on the west by the Ibuki and Yōrō mountain ranges, and to the east by the Owari Hills. Its northern border is marked by the Ryōhaku Mountains and the south by Ise Bay.

== Geography ==
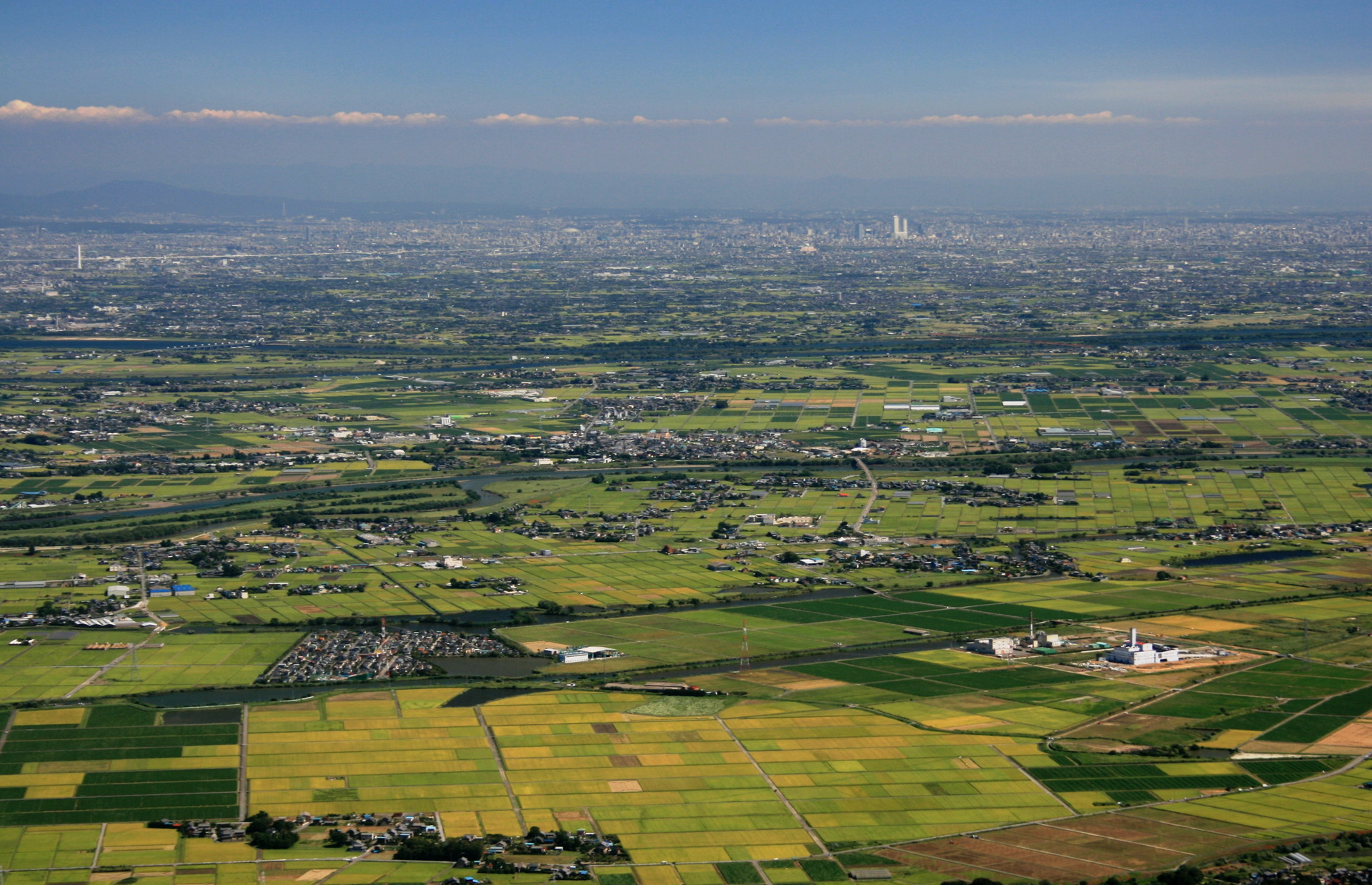
View of the Nōbi Plain, Kiso Three Rivers and Nagoya from Mount Sanpo and Mount Yoro

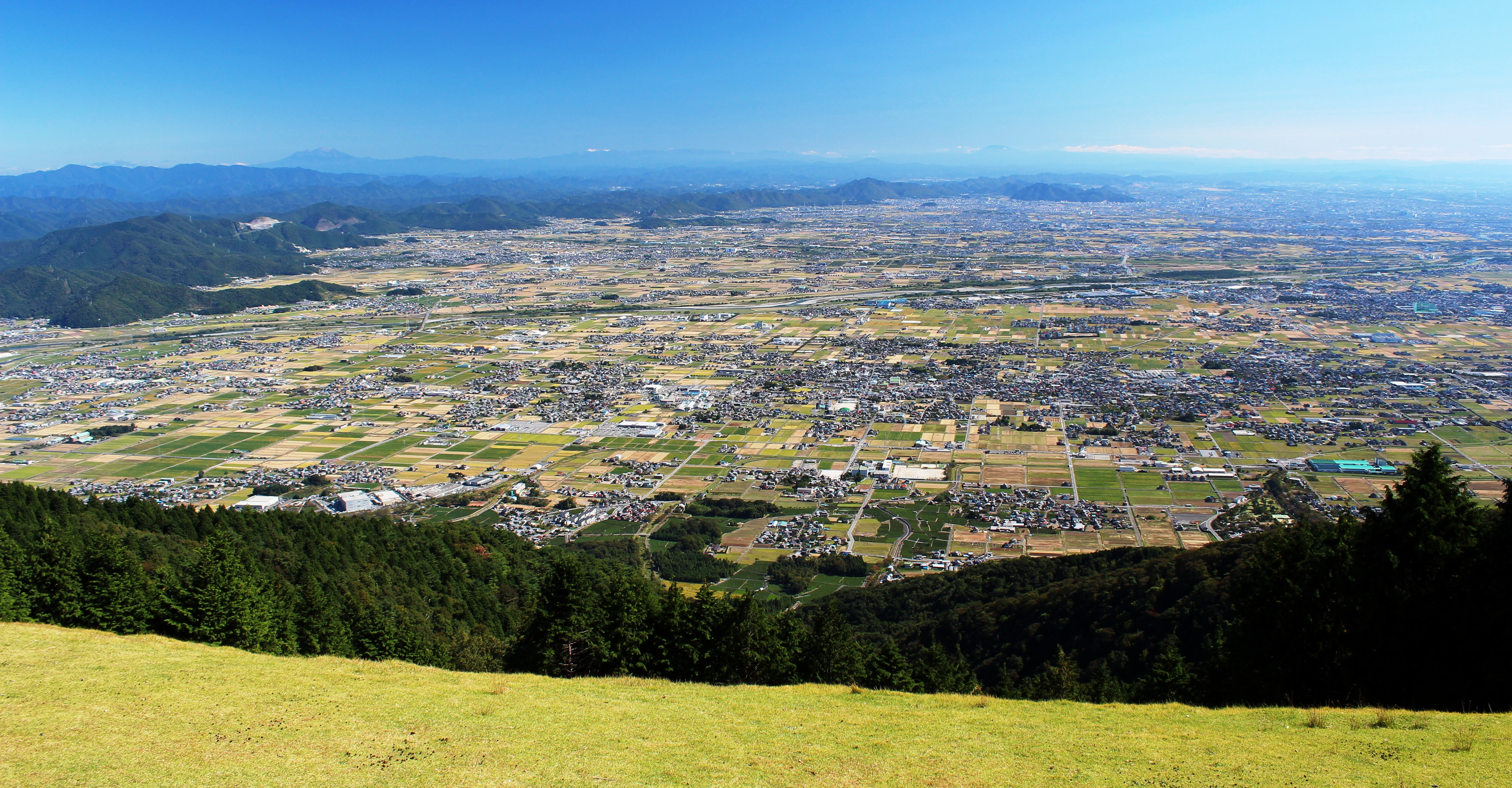
View of the Nōbi Plain from Mount Ikeda

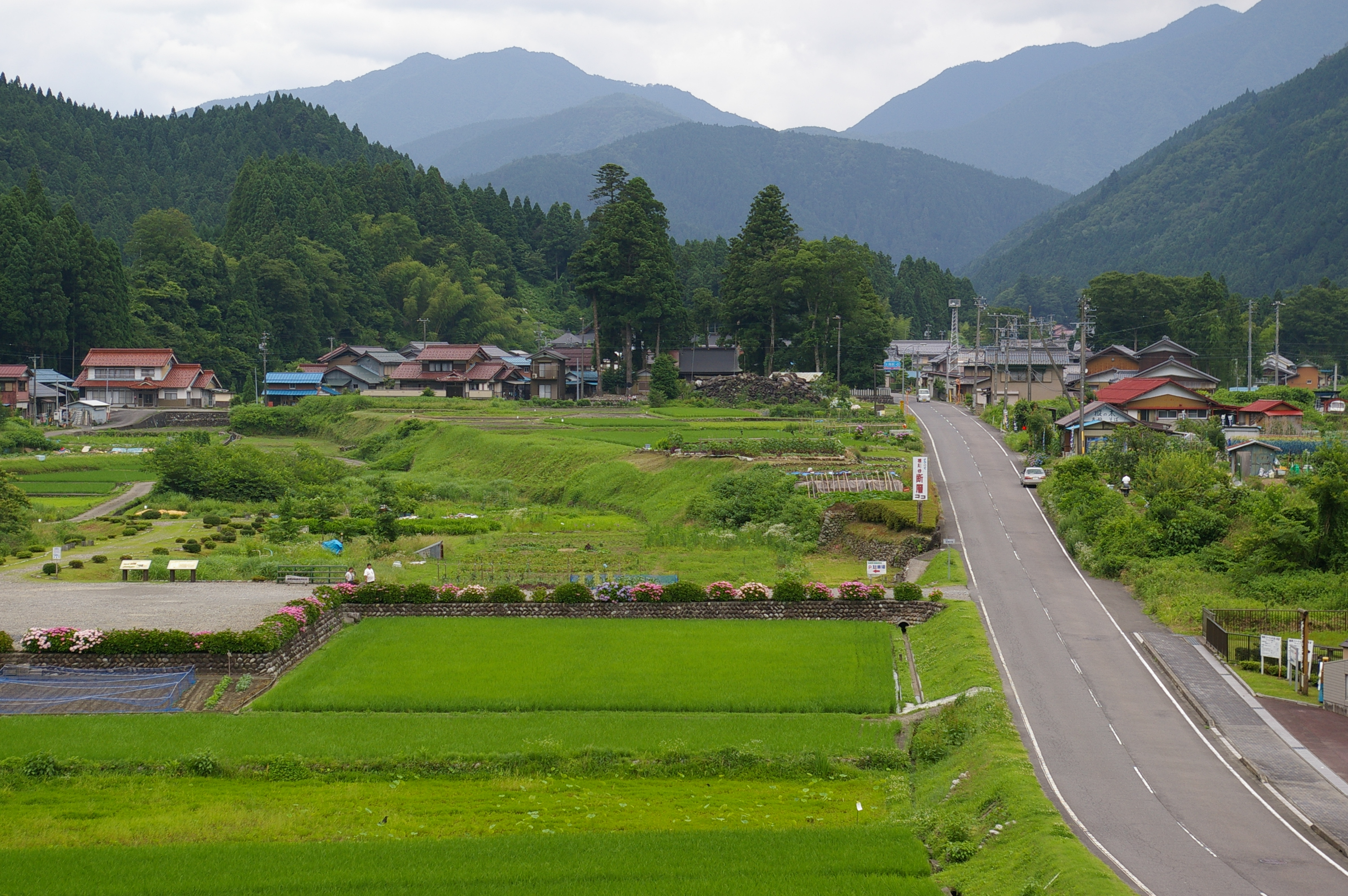
The Neodani Fault. The shift in the ground can be seen in the steep ledging through the center of the picture.

The downstream areas of the three areas are located in Aichi Prefecture and constitute a vast wetland, with the level of the land sometimes dipping below sea level. Because the water levels can change rapidly due to storms, there was often much water damage throughout history, leading to many distinct cultural habits, such as municipalities surrounded by earthen rings (e.g. Wanouchi, Gifu Prefecture). The modern cities of Tsushima and Nagoya in Aichi Prefecture were built on low-level plateaus to ward off water damage and flourished as a result.

The Yōrō Fault is located on the edge of the Nōbi Plains and is the cause of the Yōrō Mountain Range. Sedimentation from the three rivers forms the eastern edge of the plain, which easily shows the declination of the area. The declination is called the Nōbi Tilt (濃尾傾動運動 Nōbi Keidō Undō).

The Neodani Fault running through the central part of the Nōbi Plain was the cause of the 1891 Mino–Owari earthquake, one of the largest earthquakes to hit Japan's mainland. The plain was also devastated by the 1586 Tenshō earthquake, where 8,000 people died.

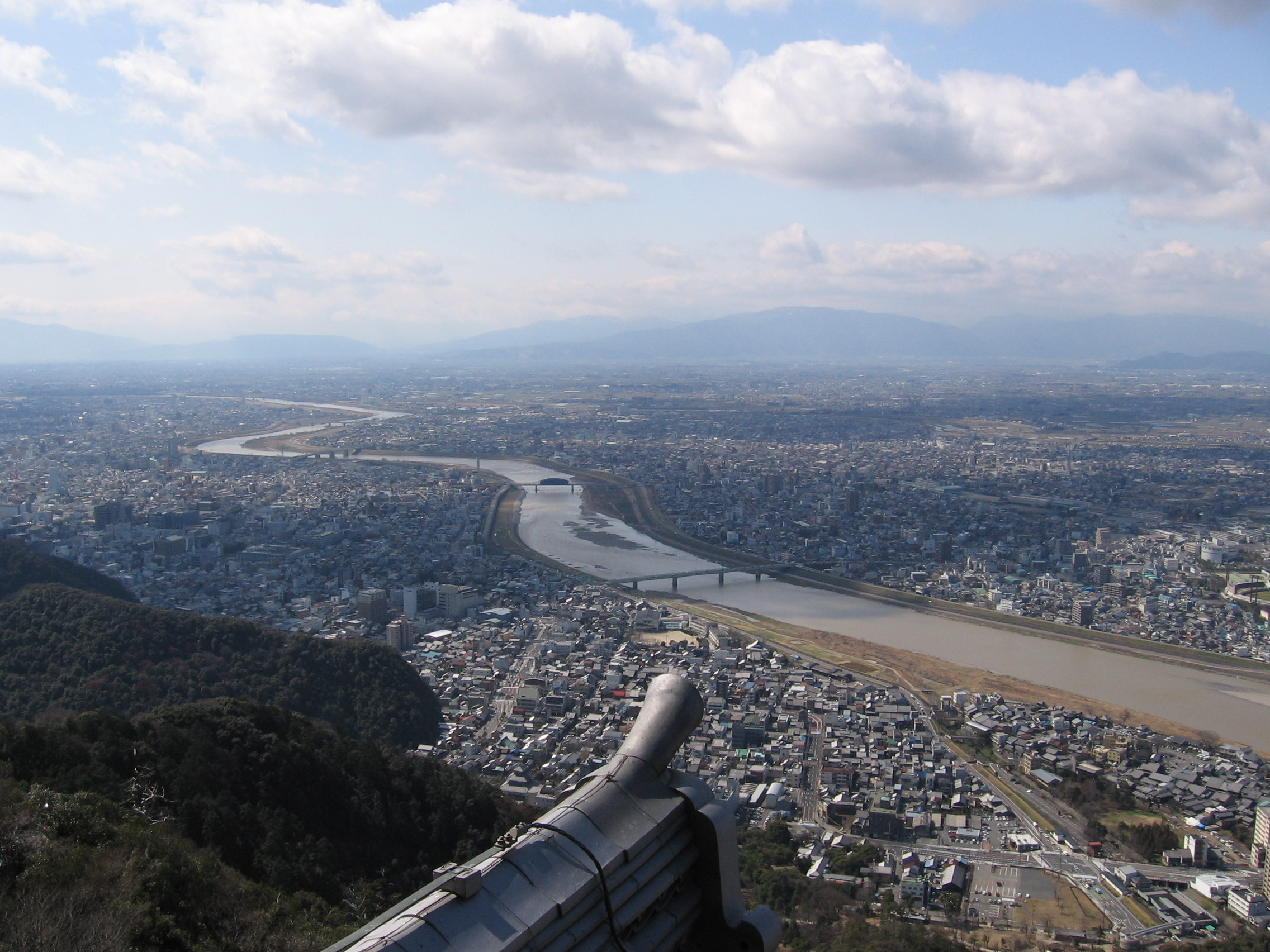
View of the Nōbi Plain from Gifu Castle

== Major cities ==
Aichi Prefecture
Nagoya, Ichinomiya, Kasugai, Komaki, Inuyama, Kōnan, Iwakura, Inazawa, Tsushima
Gifu Prefecture
Gifu, Ōgaki, Kakamigahara, Hashima

== See also ==
- Kiso Three Rivers (Kiso River – Nagara River – Ibi River)
- Ise Bay
- Nagoya
