= Kiso Three Rivers =

Major rivers in the Nōbi plain

Coordinates: 35.28°N 136.65°E

Kiso Three Rivers

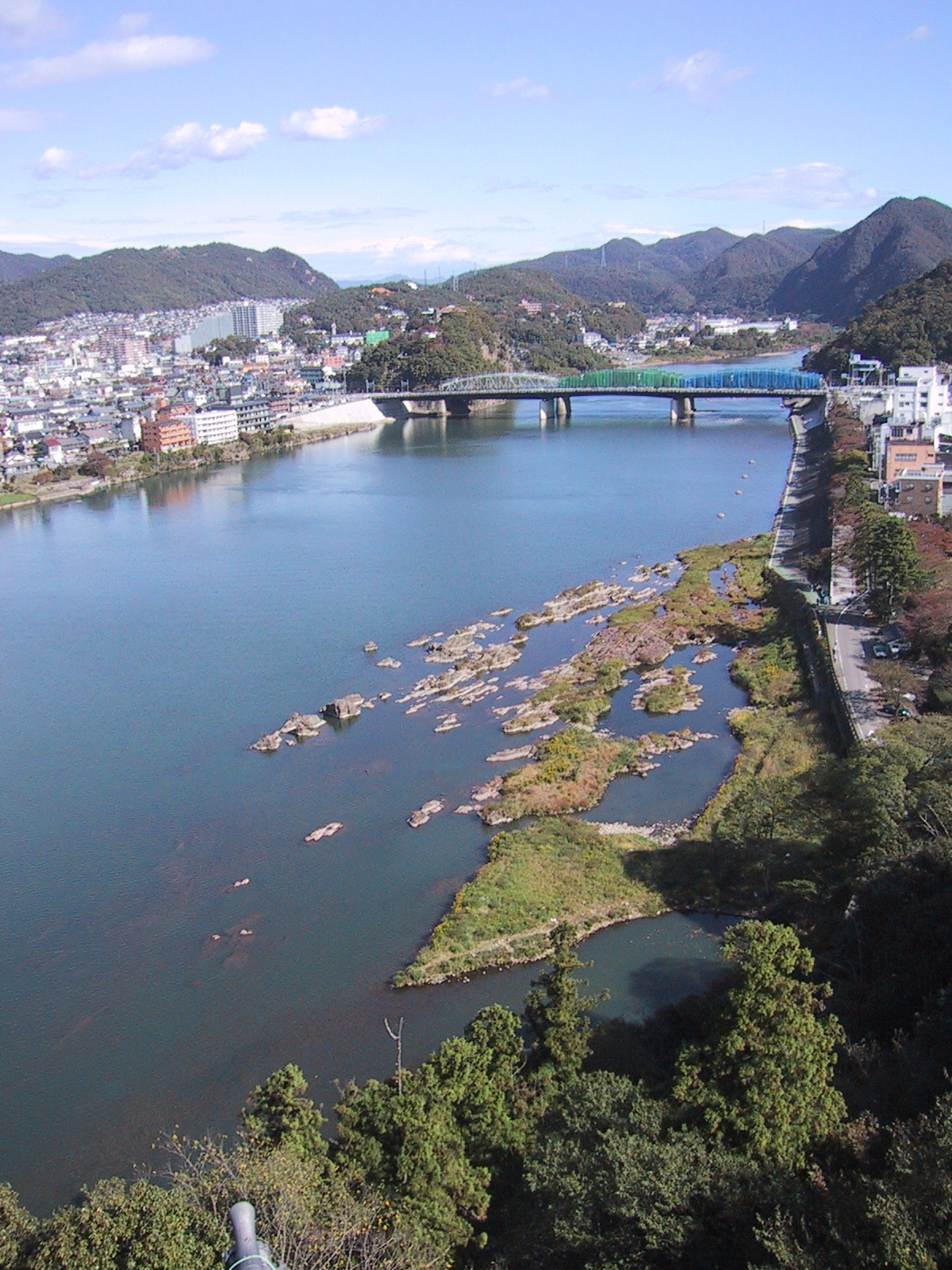
View from Inuyama Castle out over the Kiso River

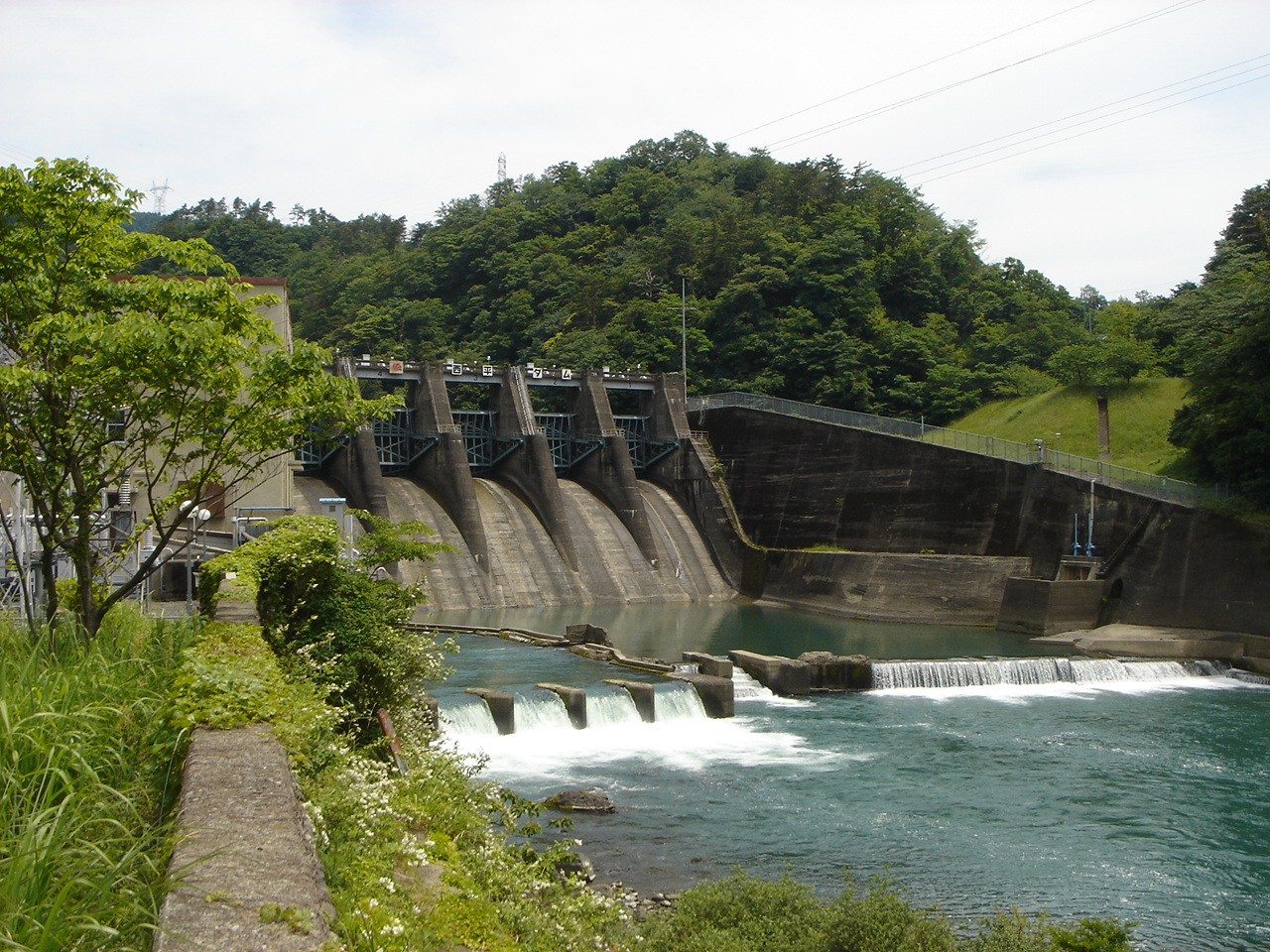
Nishidaira Dam on the Ibi River

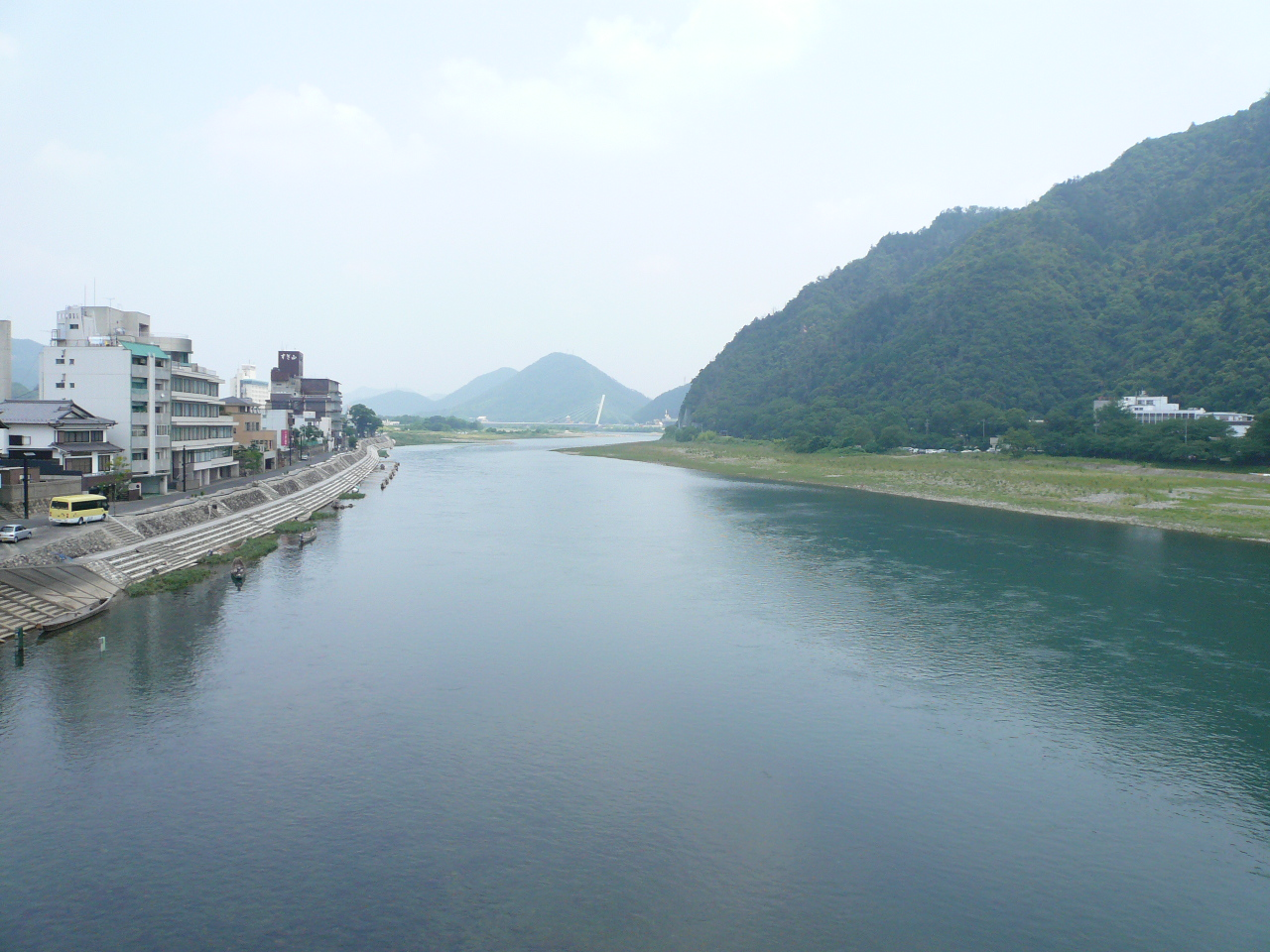
The Nagara River flowing through Gifu

The Kiso Three Rivers (木曽三川, Kiso Sansen) are the three major rivers that make up the alluvial plain area of the Nōbi Plain of Japan. The three rivers are the Kiso River, the Ibi River and the Nagara River. Given their location, they are sometimes referred to as the Nōbi Three Rivers (濃尾三川 Nōbi Sansen).

== Flow ==
At various points downstream, the rivers flow together and then separate again, often leading to flooding and water damage. Since the Edo period, much work has been done to plan dykes and other structures that will help control the rivers. In the late part of the 19th century, rulers of the Satsuma domain worked with the Dutch engineer Johannis de Rijke to help with flood control of the area.

== Attractions ==
Kiso Sansen Park (木曽三川公園 Kiso Three Rivers Park, Kiso Sansen Kōen) is Japan's largest national government park which straddles Aichi, Gifu and Mie Prefecture. The center of the park is located in the city of Kaizu in Gifu Prefecture. From the park, visitors can see each of the three rivers, as well as Ise Bay and the mountains surrounding the Nōbi Plain.

== See also ==
- Kiso River
- Ibi River
- Nagara River
