= Nagara River =

River in the Nōbi plain

Coordinates: 35°04′05″N 136°42′22″E

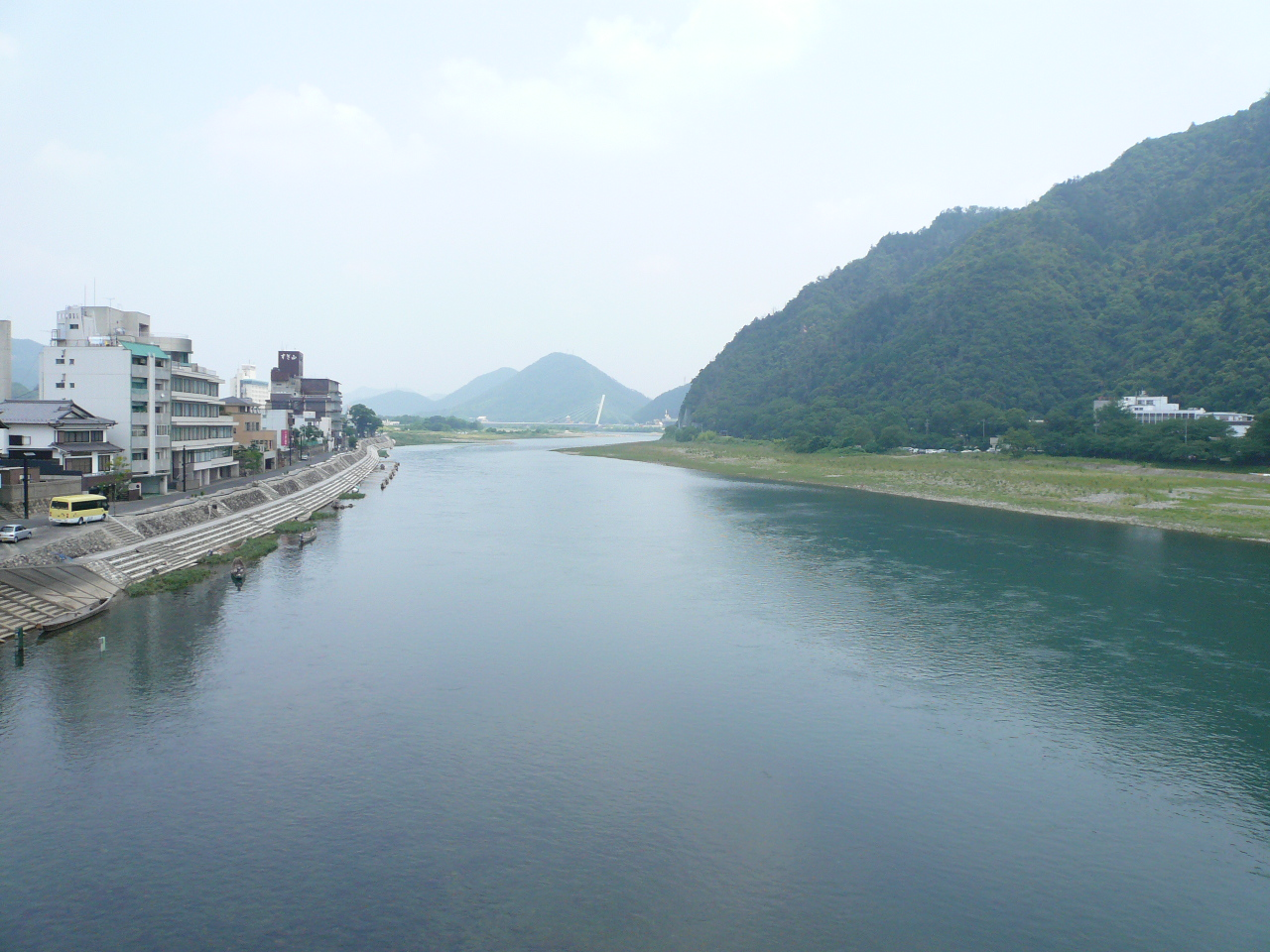
- The Nagara River flowing through Gifu

- Native name: 長良川 (Japanese)

Location
- Country: Japan

Physical characteristics
- Source
  - location: Mount Dainichi
- Mouth
  - location: Ise Bay
- Length: 166 km (103 mi)
- Basin size: 1,985 km^{2} (766 sq mi)
- Discharge
  - average: 120 m^{3}/s (4,200 cu ft/s)

Basin features
- River system: Kiso River

The Nagara River (長良川, Nagara-gawa) has its source in the city of Gujō, Gifu Prefecture, and its mouth in the city of Kuwana, Mie Prefecture, Japan. Along with the Kiso River and Ibi River, the Nagara River is one of the Kiso Three Rivers of the Nōbi Plain. Previously, the river was named Sunomata River (墨俣川 Sunomata-gawa). With a length of 166 km (103 mi), it drains an area of 1,985 square kilometres (766 mi^{2}) in the Chūbu region and empties into Ise Bay. The government of Japan classifies it as a Class 1 river.

== Outline ==
Also, famous for being a clear-flowing river, it has been named one of the "Three Clear-Flowing Rivers in Japan," along with the Kakita River in Shizuoka Prefecture and the Shimanto River in Kōchi Prefecture. In 1985, the middle section of the Nagara River was named to "Japan's 100 Famous Waters." It was included among Japan's top bathing areas in 1988 and again in 2001. The river is also a popular tourist destination because of Nagaragawa Onsen, a collection of natural hot springs (mostly in the city of Gifu) that are known for their high iron content.

Downstream, the Nagara River converges and diverges with the Kiso and Ibi rivers multiple times. Though the Nagara River is considered part of the Kiso River system, various construction projects over the years have kept the two rivers separate all the way to the mouth of the river.

Other construction projects had previously changed the flow of the river, too. Up until the Shōwa period, two minor rivers diverged from the Nagara River in the heart of the city of Gifu, but construction in 1939 created the current path of the river through the system. As a result of this construction, about 160 ha (0.62 mi^{2}) of land was recovered, upon which the Gifu Memorial Center, schools, and other buildings were built.

== Cormorant fishing ==
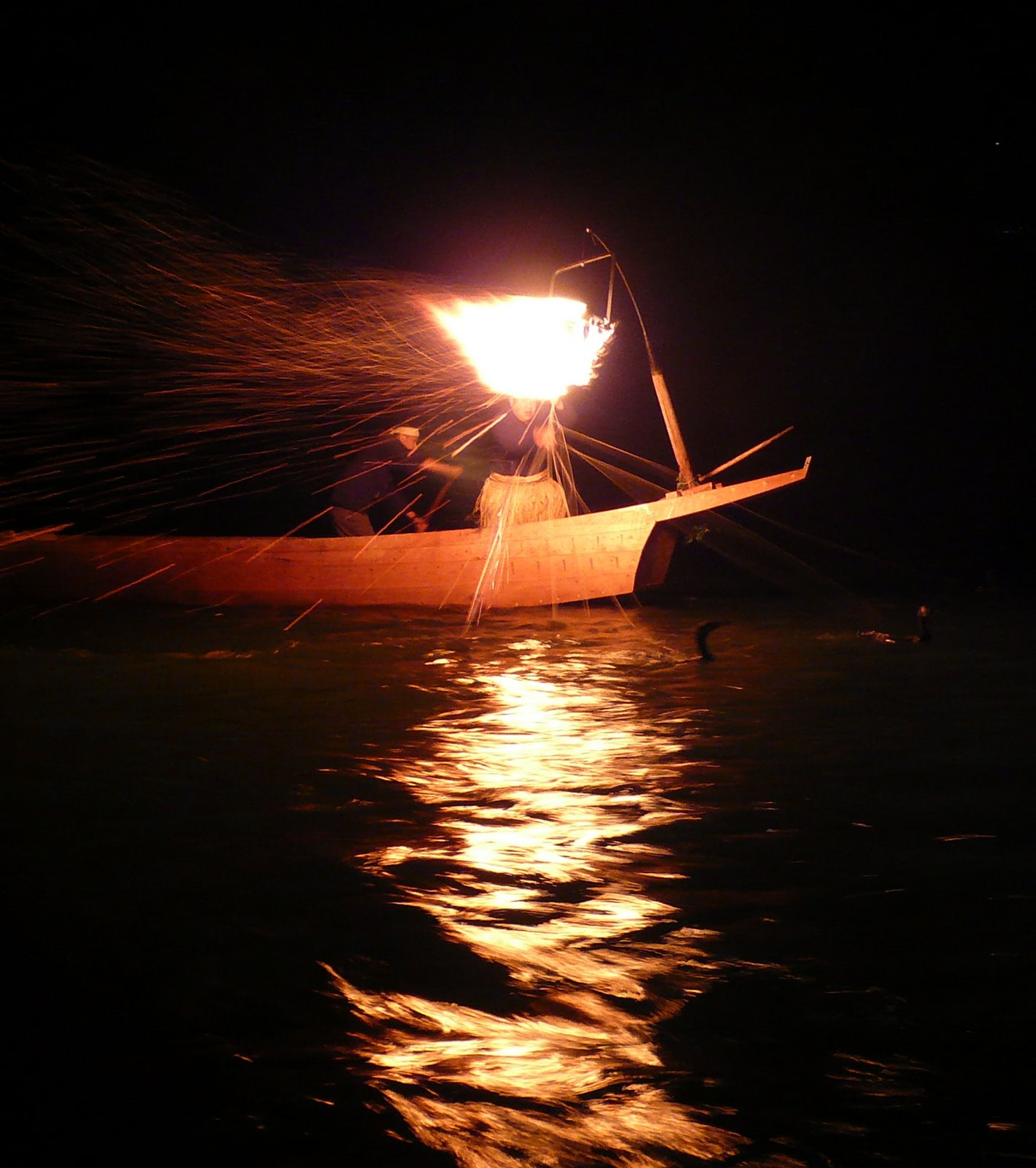
Cormorant Fishing on the Nagara River in Gifu

Cormorant fishing is an ancient tradition in which cormorants are used to catch various fish in lakes and rivers. Cormorant fishing takes place in two cities: Gifu, where it is called "Cormorant Fishing on the Nagara River," and Seki, where it is called "Oze Cormorant Fishing" (小瀬鵜飼 Oze Ukai). Though eleven other places in Japan also host cormorant fishing, only the fishing masters on the Nagara River are Imperial Fishermen of the Household Agency.

== River communities ==
The river passes through or forms the boundary of the following communities:

Gifu Prefecture
Gujō, Mino, Seki, Gifu, Mizuho, Ōgaki, Anpachi, Wanouchi, Kaizu
Aichi Prefecture
Aisai
Mie Prefecture
Kuwana

== See also ==
- Battle of Nagaragawa
- Battle of Sunomatagawa
