= Mount Hachimori (Nagano) =

Mountain in Nagano Prefecture, Japan

- 鉢盛山
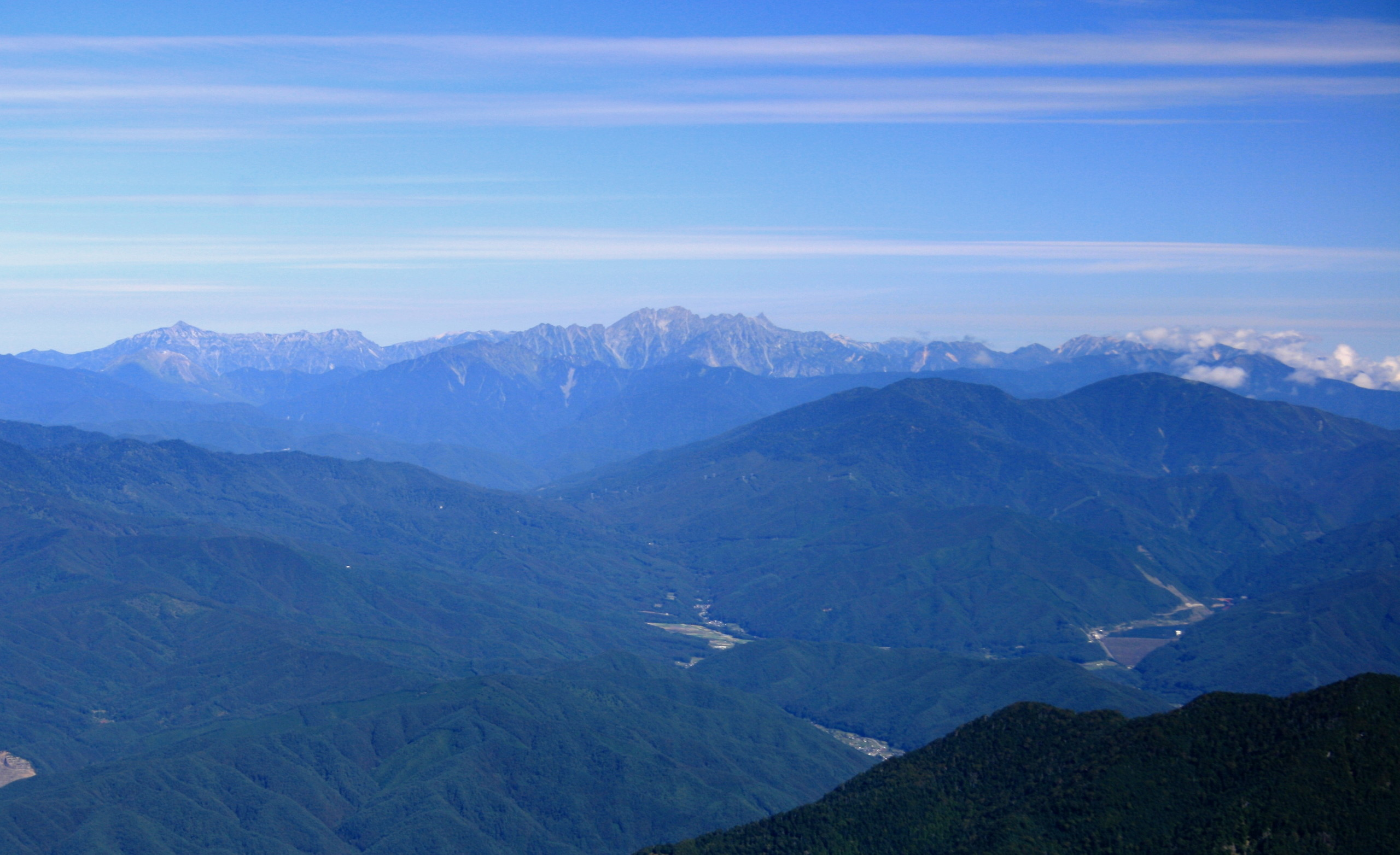
- Mt. Hachimori (center right). Misogawa Dam, which is at the top of the main stream of the Kiso River, can be seen below Mt. Hachimori.

Highest point
- Elevation: 2,446.43 m (8,026.3 ft)
- Listing: List of mountains and hills of Japan by height
- Coordinates: 36°5′12″N 137°45′17″E

Geography
- Location: Asahi Village, Nagano Prefecture, Japan
- Parent range: Hida Mountains

Mount Hachimori (鉢盛山, Hachimoriyama) is a mountain of the Hida Mountains in Nagano Prefecture, Japan. It is the source of the Kiso River.

This mountain is not to be confused with a mountain of the same name on the Japanese island of Hokkaidō.
