= Owari Hills =

Hills located in Japan

Coordinates: 35.204°N 137.163°E

The Owari Hills (尾張丘陵, Owari Kyūryō) are a set of hills located in the mid-western part of Aichi Prefecture, Japan. Centuries ago, this area made up the eastern portion of the Owari Domain.

The northern section of the hills rises to about 200 m (656 ft) above sea level. From there, the hills stretch from the city of Inuyama on the southern banks of the Kiso River to the southeast, going through the communities of Komaki and Kasugai, then continuing to the southwest until Mount Sanage along the border between Toyota and Seto. From there, the hills continue in a south westerly direction before finishing on the Chita Peninsula.
