= Siege of Kaganoi =

- Part of the Sengoku period
Date	1584
Location	Kaganoi, on the Kiso River
Result	Toyotomi victory
Territorial changes	Kaganoi falls to Toyotomi Hideyoshi

Belligerents
forces of Toyotomi Hideyoshi	forces of Oda clan

Commanders and leaders
Toyotomi Hideyoshi	Oda Nobukatsu

The 1584 siege of Kaganoi was one of the final battles fought by Toyotomi Hideyoshi in his bid to gain the lands and power of Oda Nobunaga, who died two years earlier.

Oda Nobukatsu was the most prominent of Nobunaga's relatives to oppose Hideyoshi in this quest. Hideyoshi bombarded Oda Nobukatsu's fortress at Kaganoi, and captured it soon afterwards.
