= Nagaragawa Onsen =

Thermal springs in Japan

Coordinates: 35°26′30.4″N 136°47′0.9″E

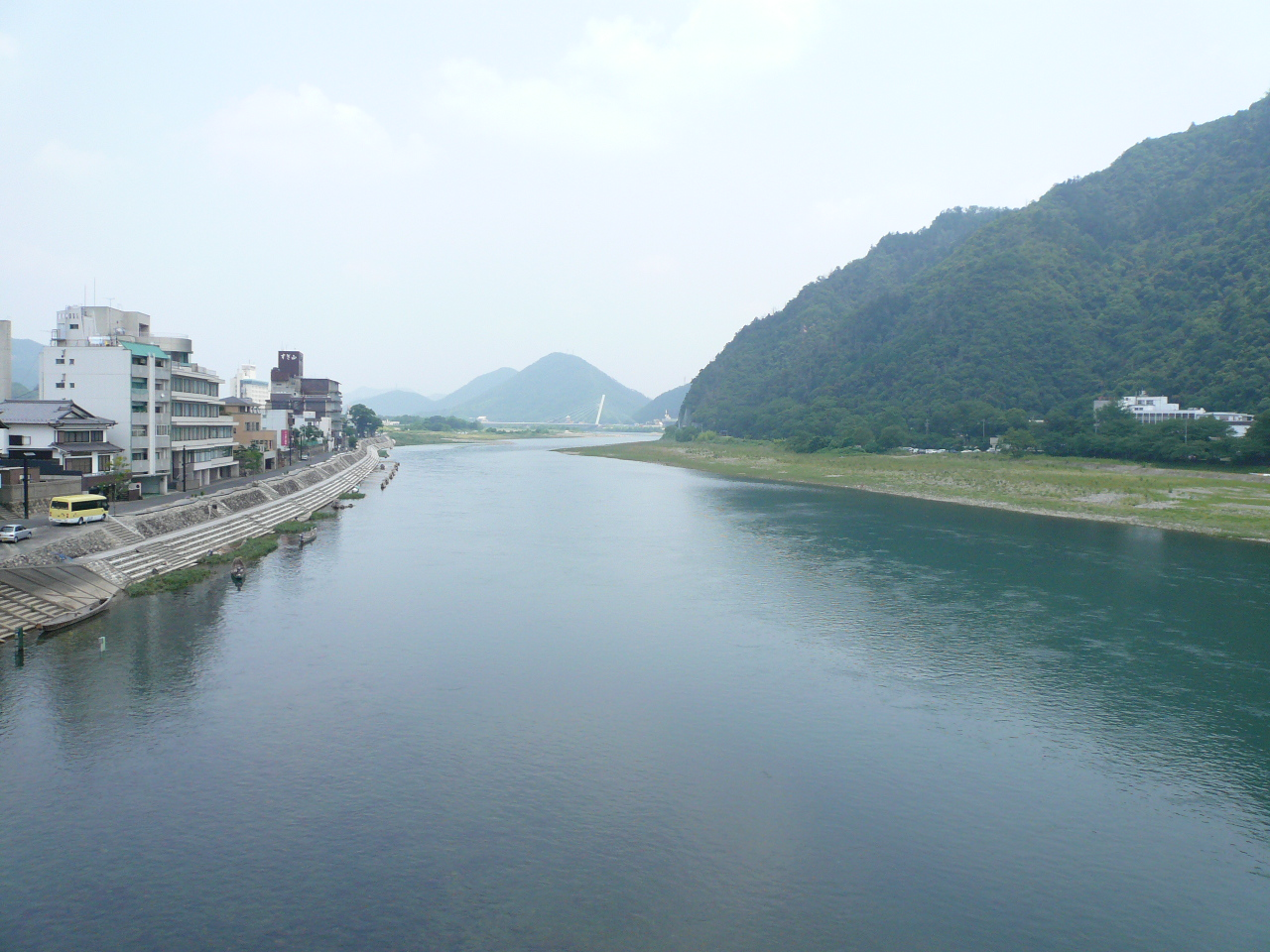
The Nagara River, with Ishikin and Sugiyama to the left and Hotel Park to the right

The Nagaragawa Onsen (長良川温泉, Nagara River Hot Springs) are a group of onsen located along the banks of the Nagara River in Gifu, Gifu Prefecture, Japan. The source of the onsen are in the northern part of the city near the Mitabora Shinbutsu Onsen (三田洞神仏温泉). The group was included on the 16th edition of Japan's Top 100 Onsen.

== History ==
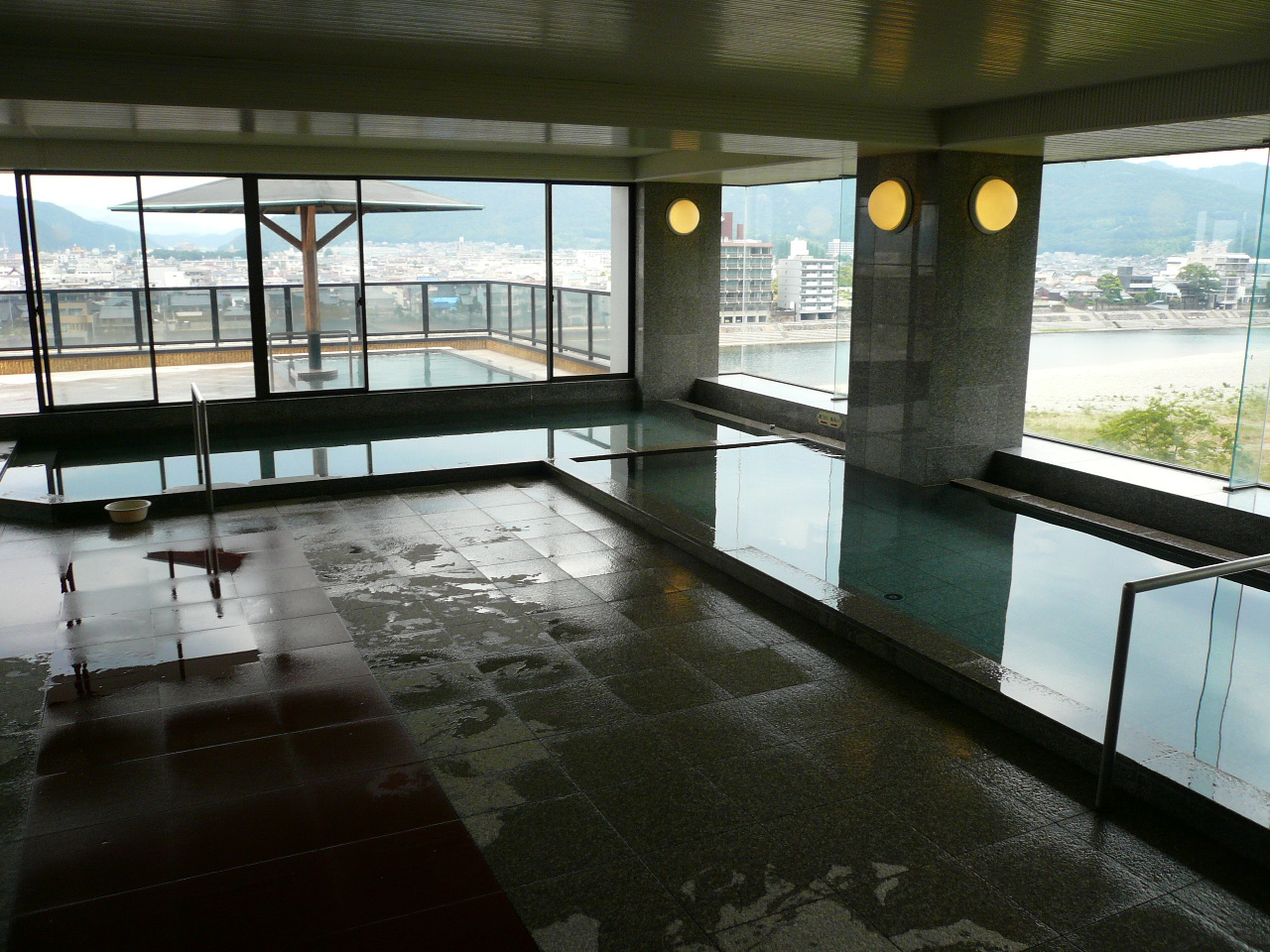
Onsen inside Hotel Park

There are records of onsens in the area from as far back as 1,300 years, but the current source, Mitabora Shinbutsu Onsen, has only been used since 1968.

During the 2004 onsen scandal in which establishments made false statements concerning the source of their water, one Ryokan was found to be charging customers for water they claimed was spring water. After the activities were confirmed, restitution was paid.

When the water for the Nagaragawa Onsen started to become brown and cloudy in 1999, new water sources were located within the city limits. In addition to using the newfound spring waters for their facilities, they also purchased land to build an onsen stand, at which they would sell the spring water at retail prices. After complaints that emptying the underground spring would ruin the land and building foundations of the surrounding residents, the project was cancelled.

== Water profile ==
The spring water is high in iron content, tinting the water a reddish-brown color. The spring water has high iron content and concentration of carbonic acid. The temperature at the source: 15 °C (59 °F); pH: 6.7; Flow: 1,000 litres (264 US gal) per minute.

== Surrounding area ==
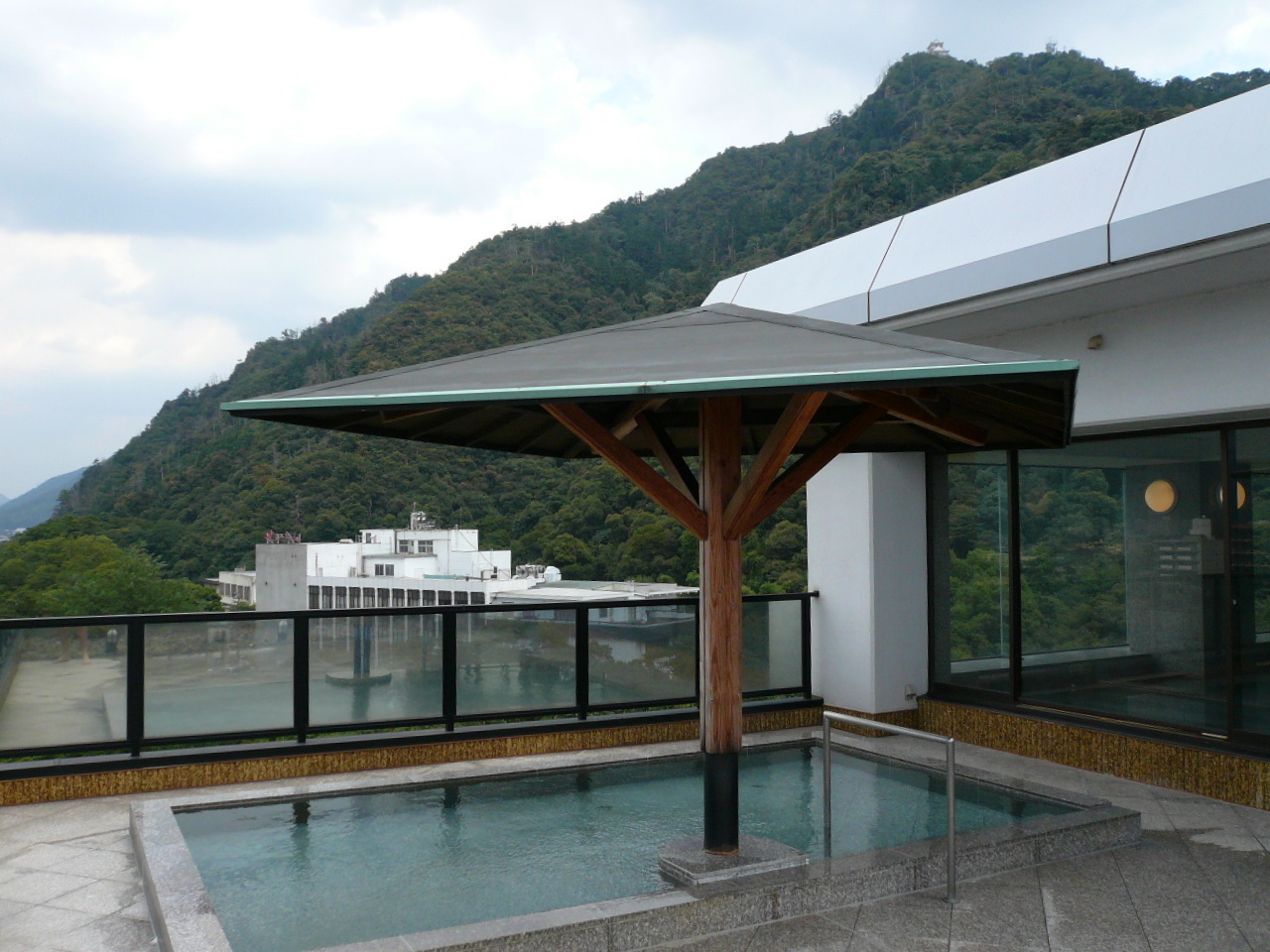
Rotenburo atop Hotel Park, with Mount Kinka in the background

The Nagaragawa Onsen are located on the northern side of Mount Kinka, near Gifu's urban center, so visitors can enjoy both city activities and the relaxing onsen. There are seven hotels and ryokan which draw water from the same source for their onsen.

During the cormorant fishing season from May 11 to October 15, guests can see parts of the fishing tradition from the hotels and ryokan. Though it takes place at night, each cormorant fishing boat has a bonfire (篝火 kagaribi) to light the river surface.
