= Misogawa Dam =

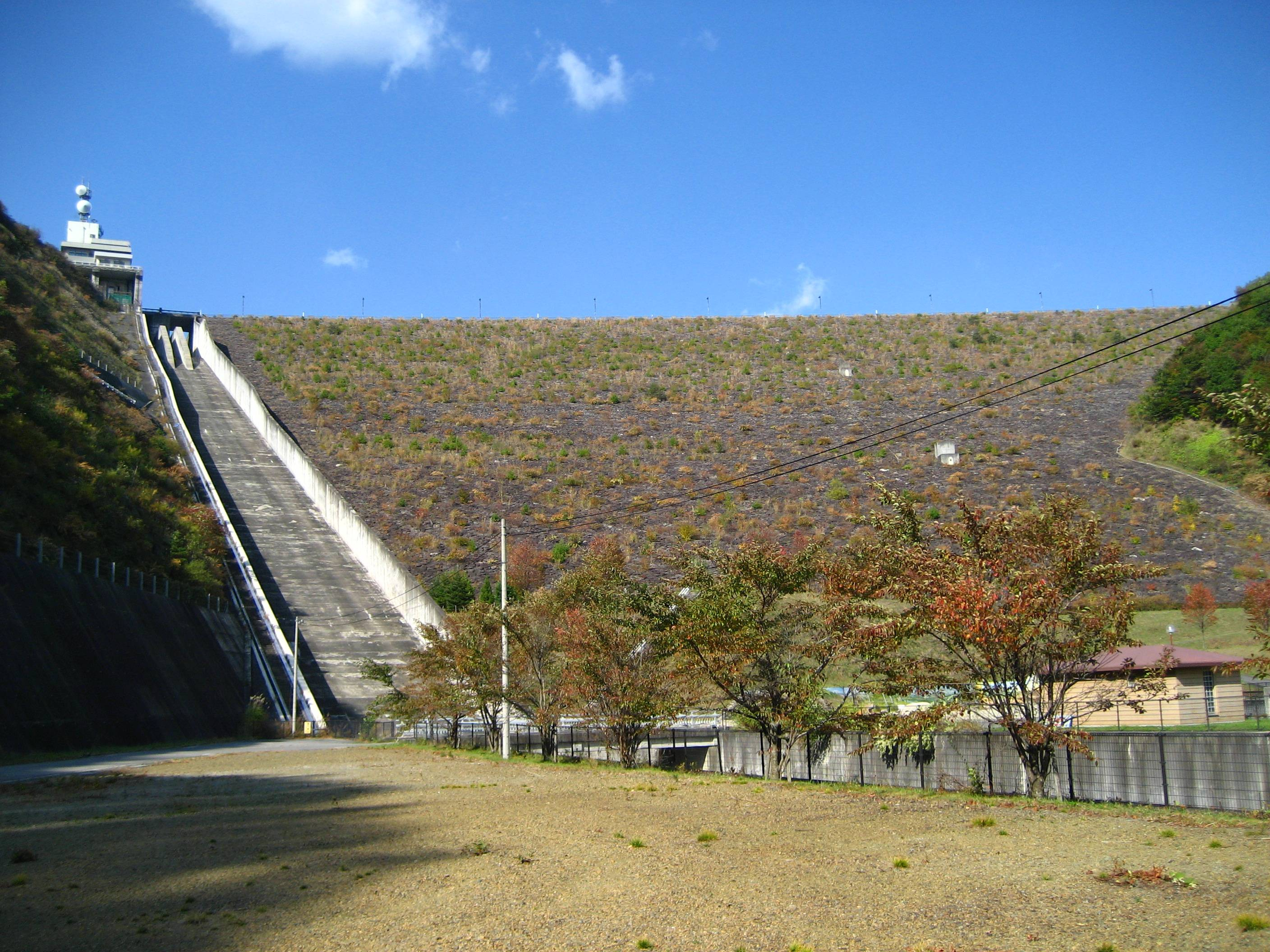
- Interactive map of Misogawa Dam
- Official name: 味噌川ダム
- Location: Nagano Prefecture, Japan
- Coordinates: 35°58′38″N 137°46′12″E
- Purpose: Flood control, unspecified water use, water supply, industrial water supply, power
- Construction began: 1973
- Opening date: 1996
- Owner: ja:水資源機構 Japan Water Agency

Dam and spillways
- Type of dam: Rock-fill embankment
- Height: 140.0 m (459.3 ft)
- Length: 447.0 m (1,466.5 ft)
- Dam volume: 8,900,000 m^{3} (11,600,000 yd^{3})

Reservoir
- Creates: Lake Okugi
- Total capacity: 61,000,000 m^{3} (49,000 acre⋅ft)
- Catchment area: 55.1 km^{2} (21.3 mi^{2})
- Surface area: 135.0 km^{2} (52.1 mi^{2})

Power Station
- Operator: ja:長野県企業局 (lit. Nagano Prefectural Bureau of Enterprise)
- Installed capacity: 4,800 kW (4.8 MW)

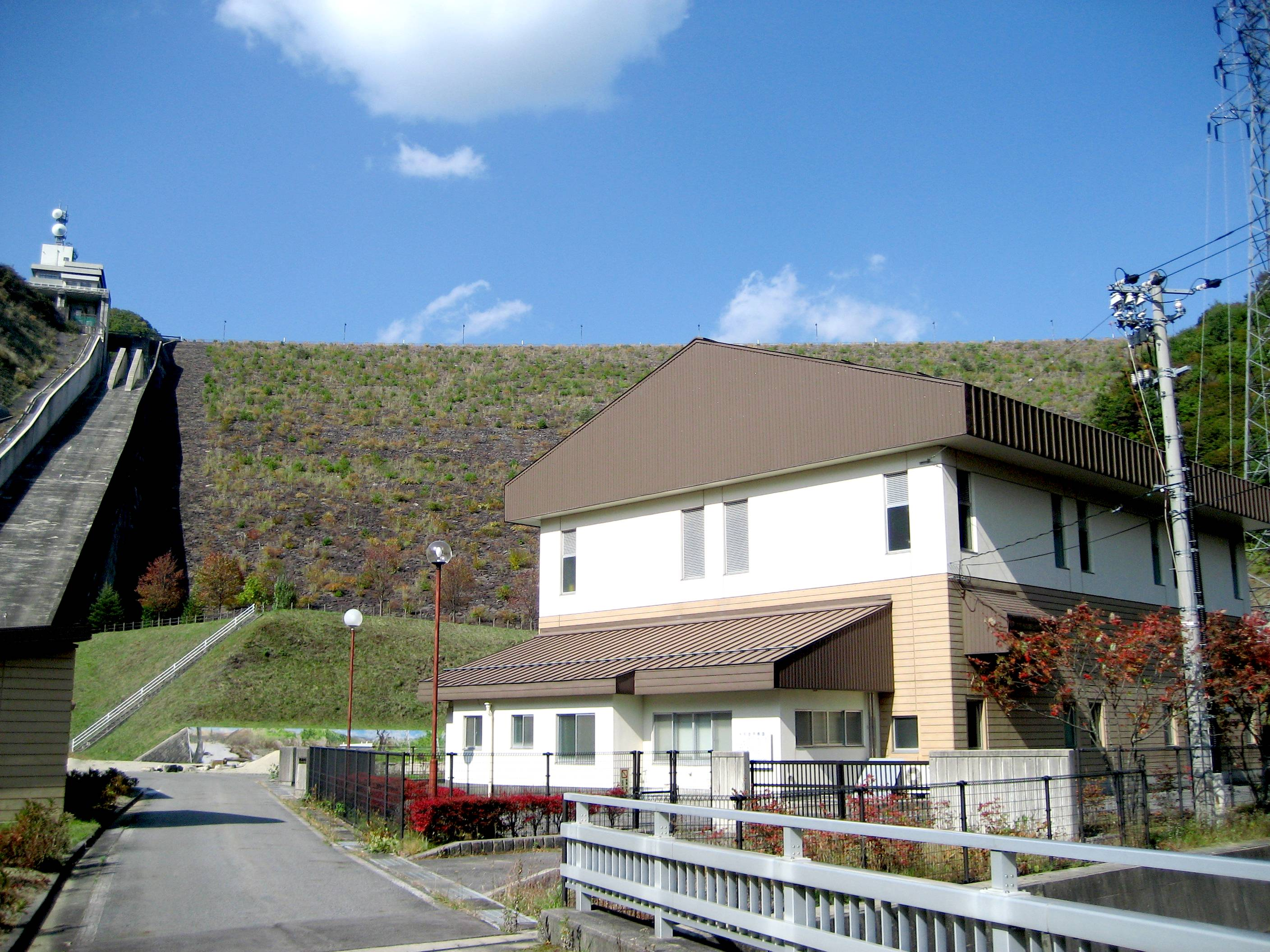
Okugiso power station

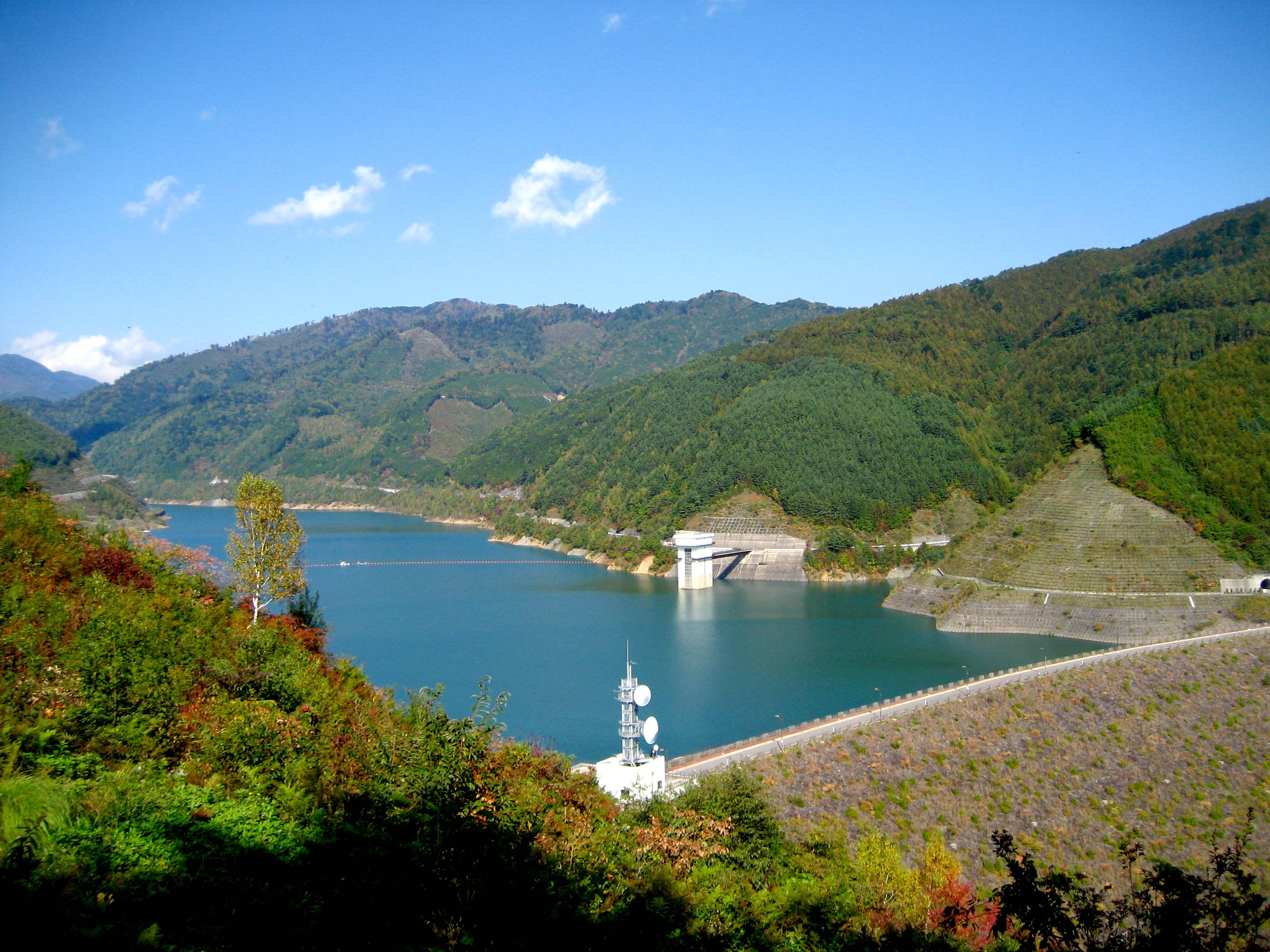

Misogawa Dam (Japanese: 味噌川ダム) is a dam of Kiso River in the Nagano Prefecture, Japan, completed in 1996.

== See also ==
- Kiso River
