= Ibi River =

Coordinates: 35°03′57″N 136°42′07″E

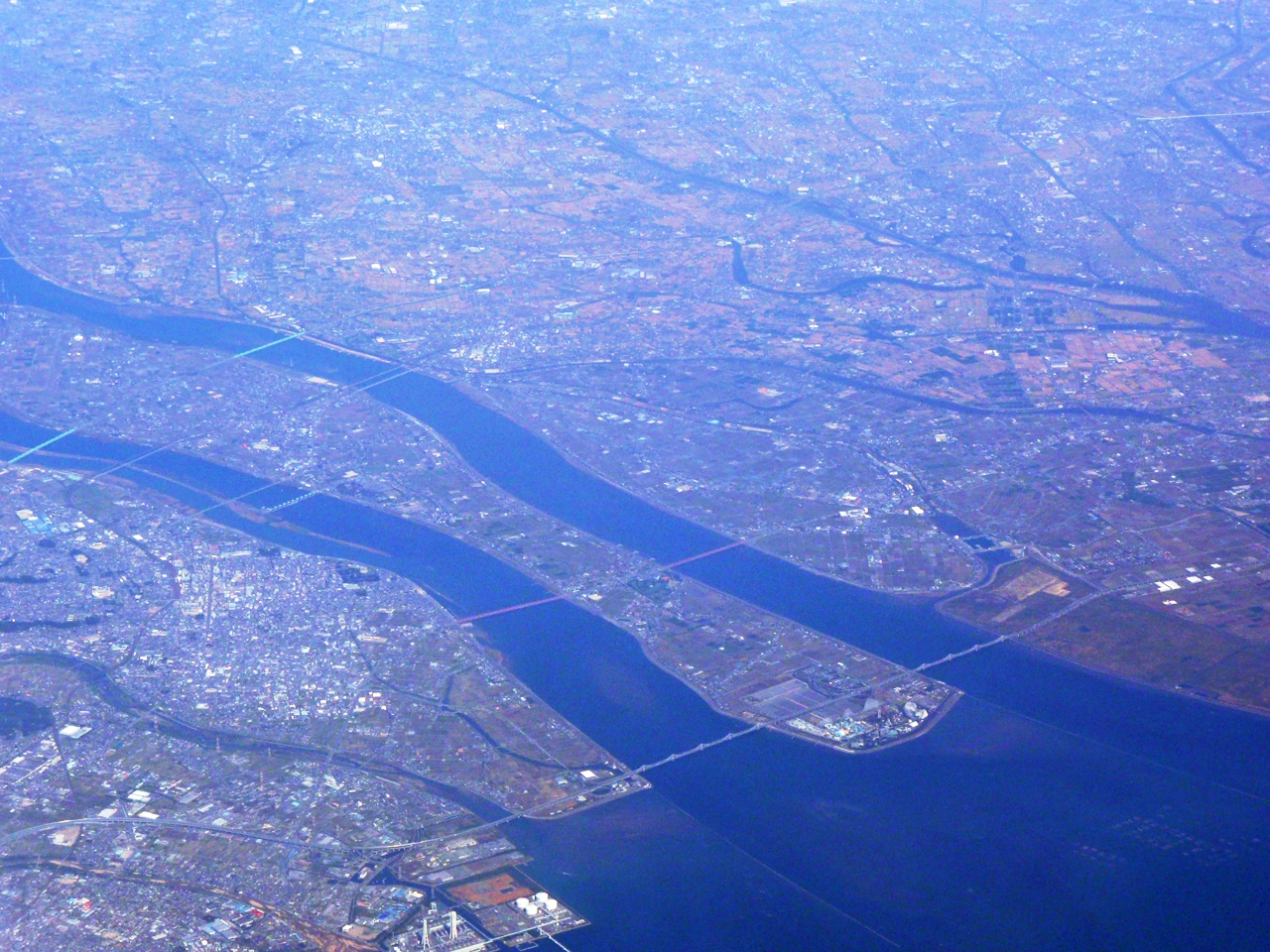
- Ibi River (left) flowing into Ise Bay. To the right is Kiso River.

- Location within Japan
- Native name: 揖斐川 (Japanese)

Location
- Country: Japan

Physical characteristics
- Source
  - location: Mount Kanmuri
  - elevation: 1,257 m (4,124 ft)
- Mouth
  - location: Ise Bay
- Length: 121 km (75 mi)
- Basin size: 1,840 km^{2} (710 sq mi)
- Discharge
  - average: 84.28 m^{3}/s (2,976 cu ft/s)

Basin features
- River system: Kiso River

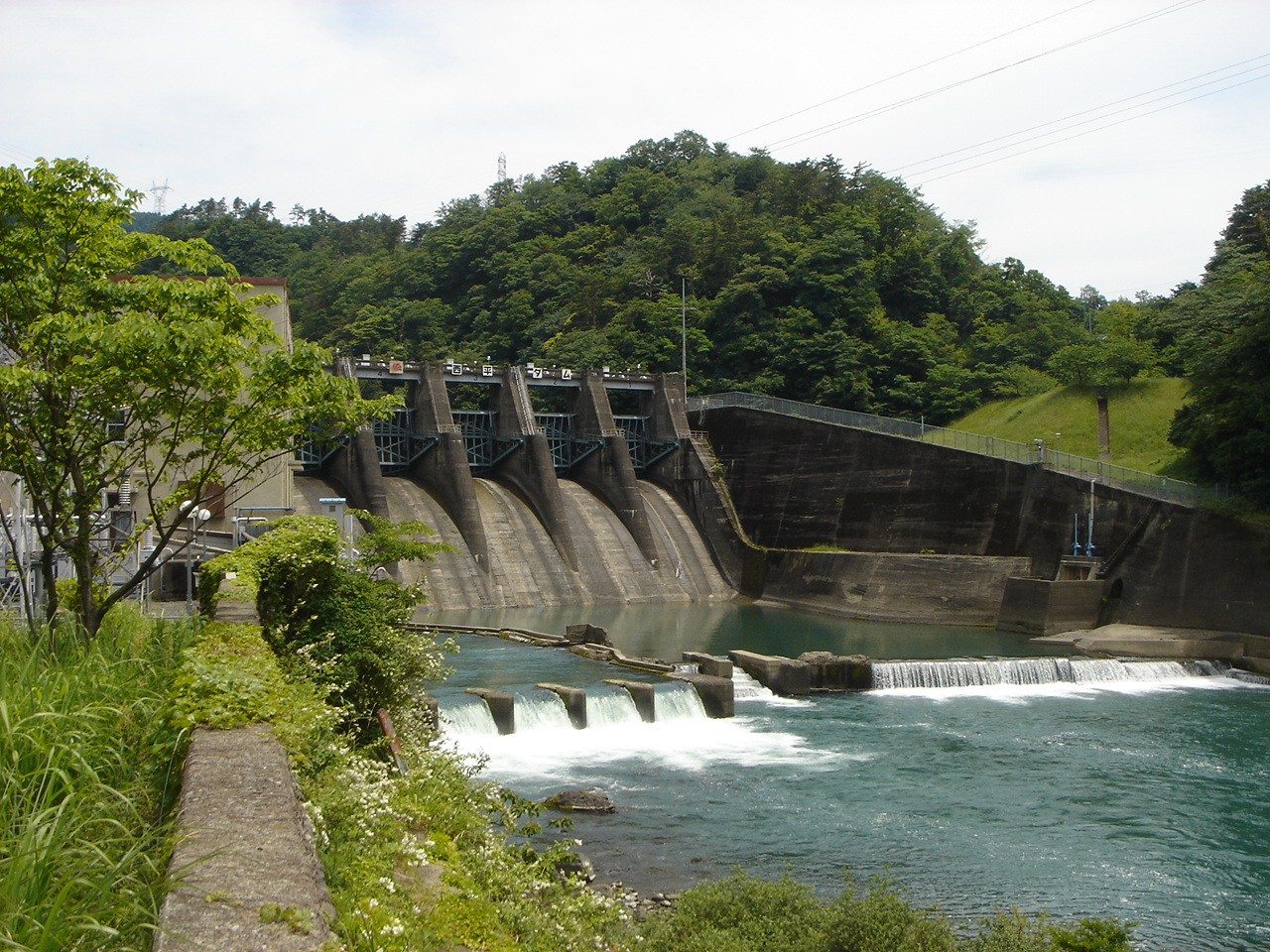
Nishidaira Dam on the Ibi River in Ibigawa

The Ibi River (揖斐川, Ibi-gawa) is a tributary of the Kiso River located in Gifu and Mie Prefectures in Japan. Along with the Nagara and Kiso rivers, the Ibi is the third of the Kiso Three Rivers of the Nōbi Plain. It is one of Japan's first-class rivers. The former Tōkaidō post station of Kuwana-juku was located on the western banks of this river during the Edo period.

== Geography ==
The Ibi River has its source in Mount Kanmuri, which is located in the town of Ibigawa in Gifu Prefecture, and from there flows south. During its course, it temporarily merges with the Kiso and Nagara rivers. In the city of Kuwana, Mie Prefecture, it finally permanently merges with the Nagara River, which in turn flows into Ise Bay.

== River communities ==
=== Gifu Prefecture ===
Anpachi, Gōdo, Ibigawa, Ikeda, Kaizu, Mizunami, Ōno, Ōgaki, Wanouchi, Yōrō

=== Mie Prefecture ===
Kuwana

== Additional notes ==
- Every year, on the second Sunday of November, there is a marathon in Ibigawa, which goes along the river's shores.
- Kuwana is considered the meeting point between Kansai dialect and Nagoya dialect.
