= Nishidaira Dam =

Dam in Gifu Prefecture, Japan

Coordinates: 35.5143°N 136.5334°E

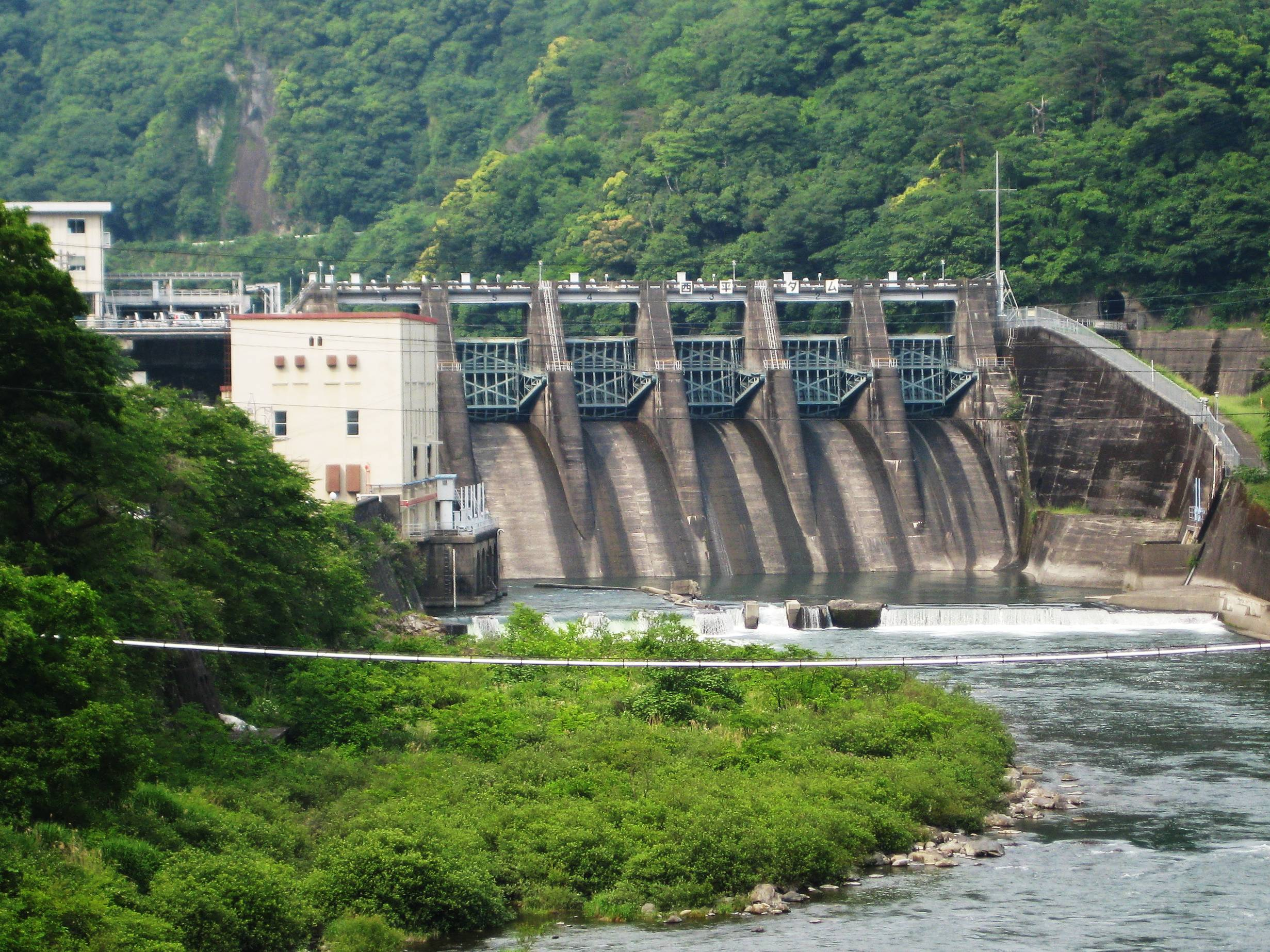
- Interactive map of Nishidaira Dam
- Location: Ibigawa, Gifu Prefecture, Japan.

Dam and spillways
- Impounds: Ibi River

Nishidaira Dam (西平ダム, Nishidaira damu) is a hydroelectric dam on the Ibi River in Ibigawa, in the Gifu Prefecture of Japan. The dam was completed in 1939.

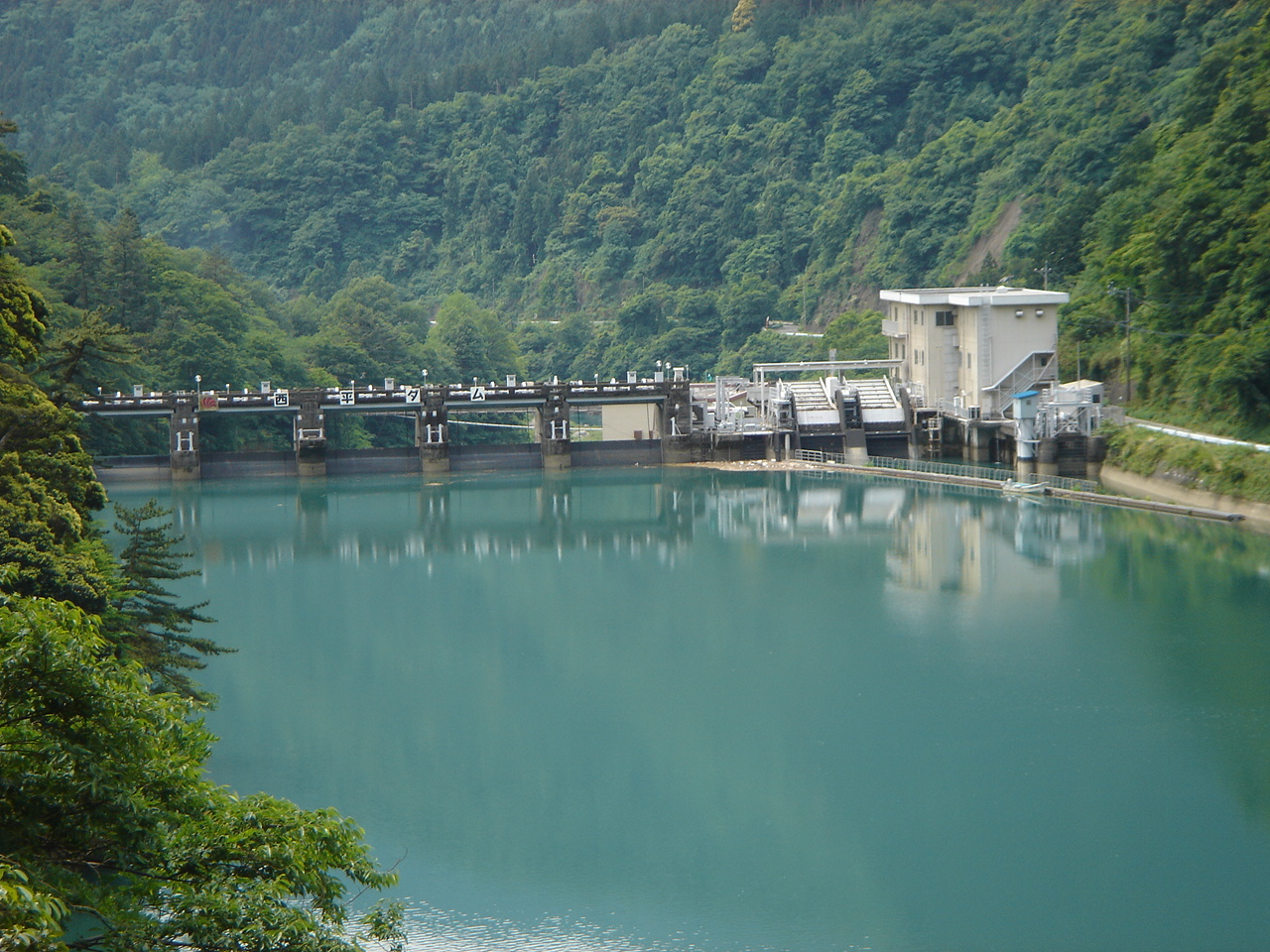
