= Wanouchi =

Wanouchi 輪之内町
- Town
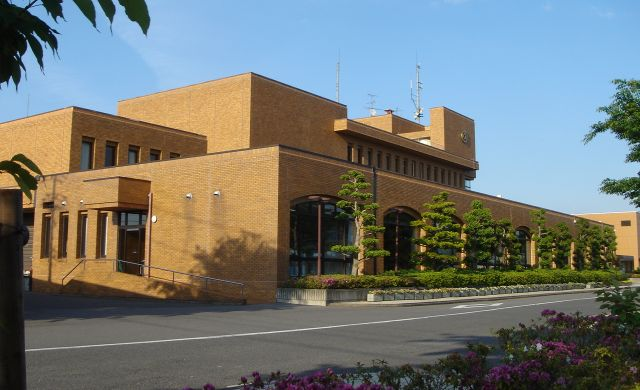
- Wanouchi Town Hall

- Flag Seal
- Motto: Shining Green Town
- Location of Wanouchi in Gifu Prefecture

- Location within Japan
- Coordinates: 35°17′6.2″N 136°38′14.6″E
- Country: Japan
- Region: Chūbu
- Prefecture: Gifu Prefecture
- Prefecture: Anpachi

Government
  - Mayor: Takayuki Kino (木野 隆之)

Area
  - Total: 22.33 km^{2} (8.62 sq mi)

Population (April 1, 2018)
  - Total: 9,910
  - Density: 444/km^{2} (1,150/sq mi)
- Time zone: JST
- Flower: Dandelion (Taraxacum officinale)
- Tree: Japanese plum (Prunus mume)
- Bird: Japanese skylark (Alauda japonica)
- Phone number: (0584)69-3111
- Address: Yogō 2530-1, Wanouchi-chō, Anpachi-gun, Gifu-ken; 503-0292
- Website: Official website (in Japanese)

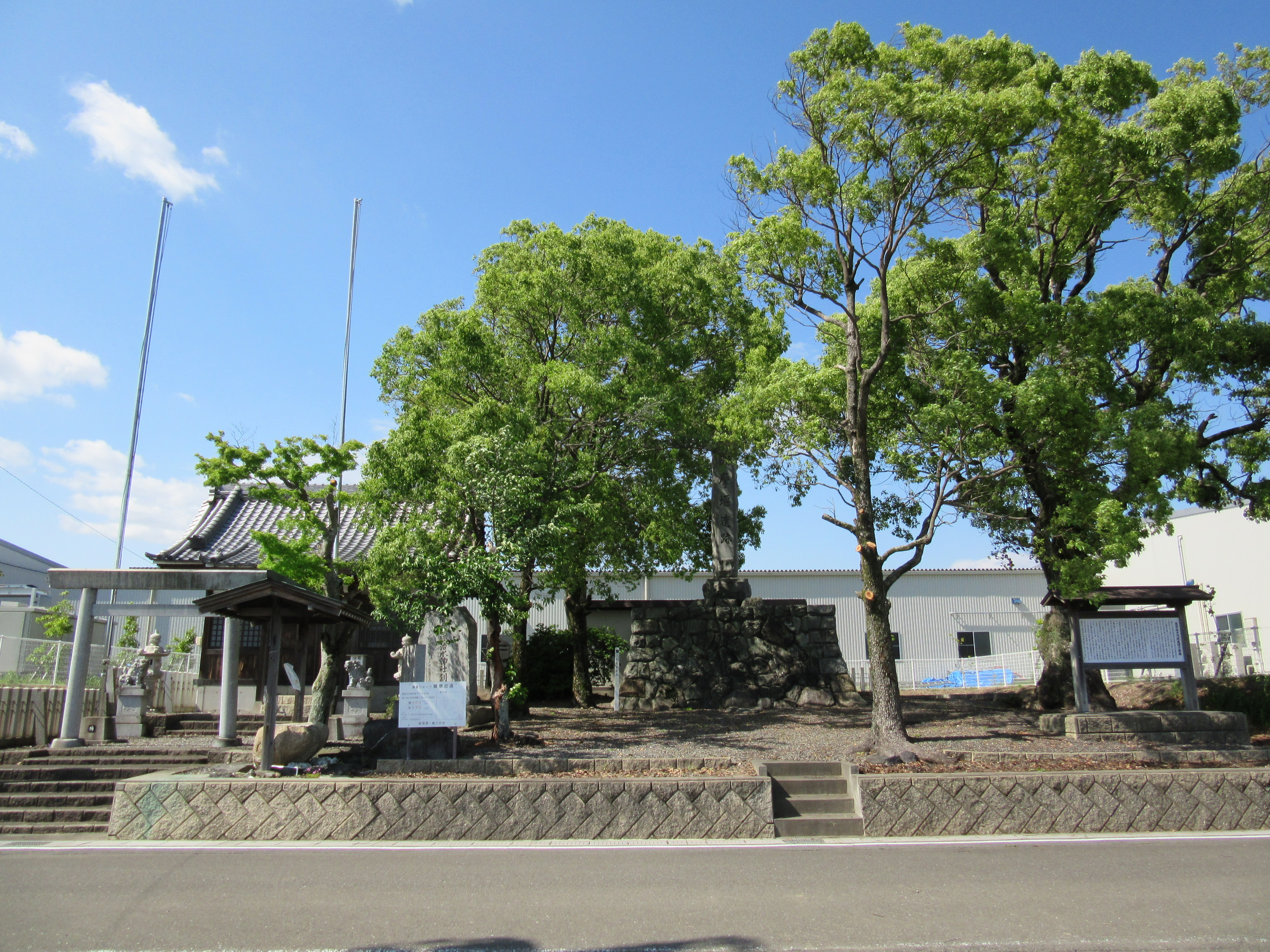
River gate weir ruins and Shinto shrine to Shimazu clan

Wanouchi (輪之内町, Wanouchi-chō) is a town located in Anpachi District, Gifu Prefecture, Japan. As of 1 April 2018, the town had an estimated population of 9,910 in 3,183 households and a population density of 439 persons per km^{2}.The total area of the town is 22.33 square kilometres (8.62 sq mi).

== Geography ==
Wanouchi is located in the northwestern portion of the Nōbi Plain in southwestern Gifu Prefecture. The kanji for Wanouchi (輪之内) literally translates to "within a circle." This name is derived from the fact that Wanouchi is situated between the Ibi River and the Nagara River. Historically, these two rivers ran together and the area known as Wanouchi today was one of many ring-levees in the middle of the river. Naturally, these levees were prone to frequent flooding and so the waters had to be diverted. Hence, Wanouchi's physical environment and history has been greatly shaped by the constant threat of floods. The town has a climate characterized by characterized by hot and humid summers, and mild winters (Köppen climate classification Cfa). The average annual temperature in Wanouchi is 15.4 °C. The average annual rainfall is 1828 mm with September as the wettest month.The temperatures are highest on average in August, at around 27.7 °C, and lowest in January, at around 4.1 °C.

=== Neighbouring municipalities ===
- Gifu Prefecture
  - Anpachi
  - Hashima
  - Kaizu
  - Ōgaki
  - Yōrō

== Demographics ==
Per Japanese census data, the population of Wanouchi has recently plateaued after a long period of growth.

Historical population
Year	Pop.	±%
1970	7,469	—
1980	8,111	+8.6%
1990	8,385	+3.4%
2000	9,141	+9.0%
2010	10,028	+9.7%
2020	9,654	−3.7%

== History ==
The area around Wanouchi was part of traditional Mino Province. During the Edo period, it was mostly controlled by Ōgaki Domain. In 1754, the Tokugawa shogunate, ordered the powerful Satsuma Domain from Kagoshima to build embankments in order to divert the rivers in the area for flood control and as a measure to drain off Satsuma Domain's wealth to reduce its potential as a threat to Tokugawa rule. This was later known as the Hōreki Age River Improvement Incident. The construction of these banks proved extremely dangerous and difficult, hampered both by nature and by obstruction from the Tokugawa shogunate. It is said that a human sacrifice was made in the Wanouchi area during the construction when a local retainer voluntarily gave his life by remaining under the rushing waters in order to keep a foundation pillar from moving until it could be secured from above. As well as aiding in the construction, this sacrifice was also treated as an offering to the gods ensuring the successful completing of the project. Several Satsuma samurai associated with the project committed "seppuku" (ritual suicide). The construction was completed in 1755. More than 80 people died. The graves of 8 of these men are located around Wanouchi. Due to the construction of many banks over the last 200 years, the waters surrounding Wanouchi have become two separate rivers, the Ibi River and Nagara River. The area located between the two rivers is referred to as the "Waju-tei" (輪中堤 or Waju levee). The name Wanouchi originates from this word and means "the town in Waju-tei".

During the post-Meiji restoration cadastral reforms, the area was organised into Anpachi District, Gifu. In 1954, the three villages Niki, Fukuzuka, and Oyabu were merged to form the town of Wanouchi. In 1976, the Nagara River swelled and flooded Wanouchi's neighbouring towns, Anpachi, Gifu and Sunomata, Gifu. However, the people of Wanouchi were protected from the floods because of the strong embankments.

== Economy ==
Wanouchi's main areas of employment is in the manufacturing industry. However, many citizens also derive income from agricultural activities.

== Education ==
Wanouchi has three public elementary schools and one public middle school operated by the town government. The town does not have a high school.

== Transportation ==
=== Railway ===
- Wanouchi has no passenger railway service.

=== Highway ===
- National Route 258

== Culture ==
=== Festivals ===
Kayu no Tsuke

For over 100 years, every January, a ritual has been performed to predict the coming year's rice harvest. In the dead of night, farmers gather at four shrines in Wanouchi to witness the ritual. Rice is steamed together with hollow, slender stalks of bamboo about 20 cm. in length. When the rice is ready, a priest slices the bamboo lengthwise. The amount of rice that has been cooked inside the stalk is believed to indicate the abundance of the next year's harvest.

Locations: Hakusan Shrine (白山神社), Kamo Shrine (加茂神社), Hachiman Shrine (八幡神社), and Hakusan Hime Shrine (白山比売神社) Date: January 15

The Hoei no Mai Performance

This event occurs twice a year in memory of the Satsuma samurai. For over 200 years in the spring and autumn young girls have performed special dances and songs at the Chisui Shrine.

Location: Chisui Shrine (治水神社) Dates: April 5 and October 5

The Zosui Festival

It is said, that over 400 years ago, a god was carried by a great flood, or "zosui", to the Gotago area of Wanouchi. Thus, the Zosui Festival honours this god who is believed to protect Wanouchi from floods. Since "zosui" is also the name of a rice and vegetable porridge, people offer this porridge to the god. During the festival, the Shinmei Shrine is decorated with paper lanterns. Festivities include taiko drumming and the Shirakawa dance.

Location: Shinmei Shrine (神明神社) Date: July 16

Noryo Hometown Festival

During Japan's stifling hot and humid summer, the Noryo Hometown Festival gives the people of Wanouchi the chance to enjoy Obon dancing in the cool of the evening. This festival occurs in the middle of August in conjunction with the nationwide festival, Obon. During Obon it is customary for people to return to their hometown, don yukatas and join in the local festivities.

Location: Town Office (役場) Date: August 15

Sangyo Festival

The Sangyo Festival is a yearly celebration of Wanouchi's thriving industries. It is a chance for farmers and manufacturers to peddle their wares. "Takoyaki," yakisoba," baked yams, beer, and confections are available at food booths. Various entertainment events such as lotteries, karaoke competitions and firework displays create a carnival-like atmosphere. The grand finale of the 2 day fair is the Rice Cake Toss when hundreds of rice cakes are hurled into the crowd and everyone scrambles for them. The Sangyo festival provides an opportunity for people from various backgrounds to gather in Wanouchi.

Location: Town Office (役場) Date: First weekend in October

The Gomando Festival

This Shinto festival, honoring the water god "Gomando", dates back to 1624. In the early evening, residents of Mirushinden gather at the Myoko Temple to acknowledge the community's founder, Kazuya Sozaemon. They then proceed to Tado shrine, nestled in a small pine grove. There, the sake flows, enhancing the pounding of taiko drums as people wearing "happi" (festival) coats and brightly decorated umbrella hats perform the Shirakawa dance. Paper flowers on the dancers' hands add to the colourful spectacle.

Location: Tada Shrine (多度神社) Date: October 3

Wanouchi Autumn Festival

On the evening of October 10, the rhythm of taiko drums echoes through Wanouchi. The Autumn Festival is a time for families to get together and enjoy a feast. Wanouchi's three traditional dances, the Dengarakashi dance, the Ondo dance and the Shirakawa dance can be seen at various Shinto shrines.

Location: Various Shrines in Wanouchi Date: October 10

=== Local dialect ===
The local dialect, called Wanouchi-ben, is a colourful mixture of Nagoya, Gifu and Kansai dialects.

Dialect	Standard Japanese	English
wakarahen / wakaran	wakarimasen	I don't understand.
shiran	shirimasen	I don't know.
orahen / gozarahen	orimasen / gozaimasen (imasen)	(Someone) is not here.
ō ki ni	arigato	thank you
yattokame	hisashiburi	Long time, no see.
ee tenki ya namo	ii tenki desu ne	Nice weather, isn't it?
akan	dame	bad / must not do
erai	tsukaremashita / taihen / kurushii	tired / difficult / painful
hayo hayo!	hayaku hayaku!	Hurry up!
anbayo	jōzu ni	skillfully
a'chibeta ko'chibeta	achi kochi	here and there
ketta mashin	jitensha	bicycle
nebuka	negi	green onion
jagatara	jagaimo	potato
kōrai	kōn	corn
jiimo	satoimo	taro

== Sister cities ==
- Hinton, Alberta, Canada, since 1998. The partnership is primarily for educational and cultural exchange. Every year, students from Wanouchi Junior High School travel to Hinton to learn about Canadian life and culture while living with a host family. Every two years, students from Hinton's Harry Collinge Junior High School visit Wanouchi and live with local families.
