= Ise Bay =

Bay of the Iso Three Rivers

Ise Bay 伊勢湾
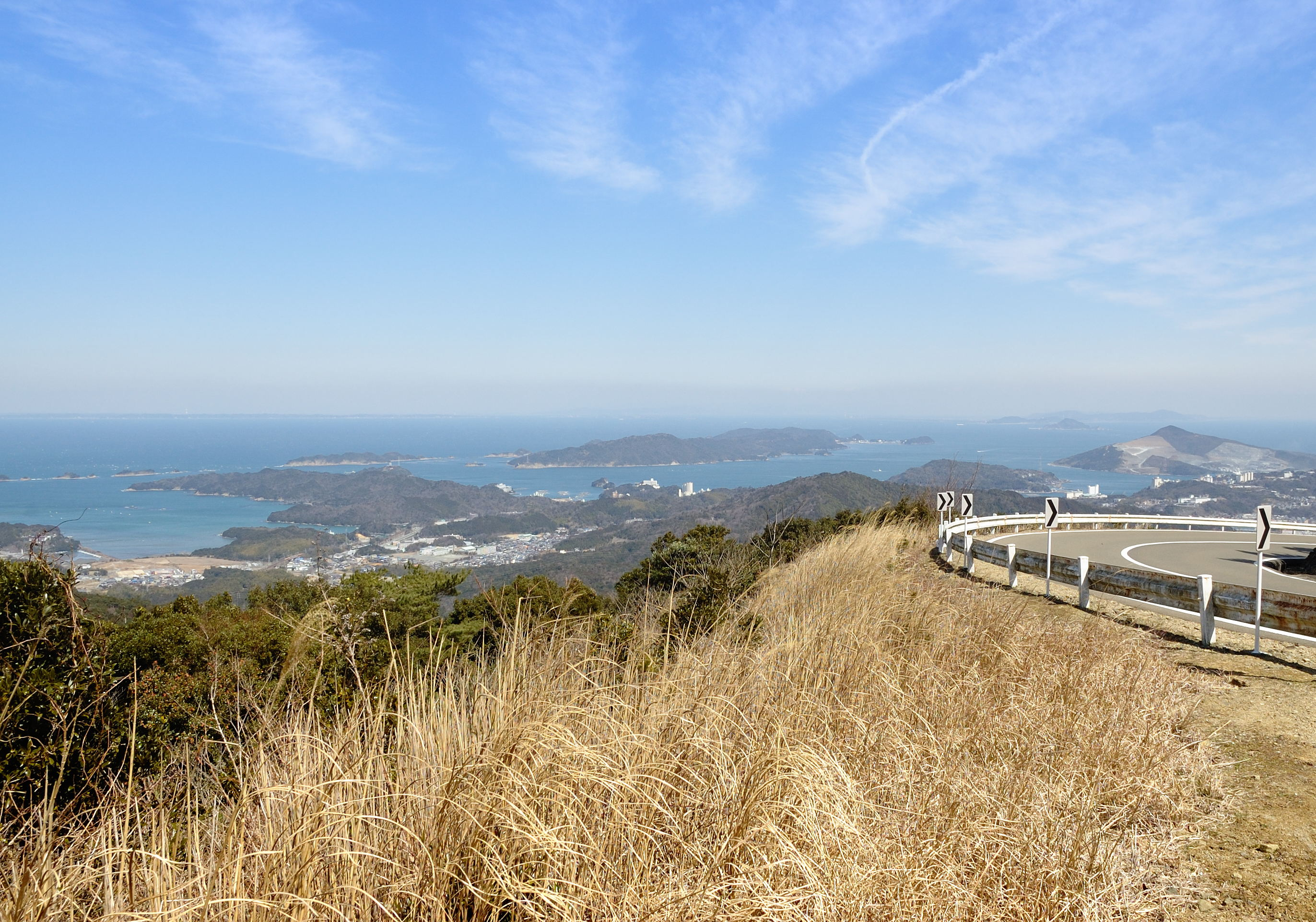
- Ise Bay as seen from Ise City Skyline

- Location within Japan Location within Mie Prefecture
- Coordinates: 34°45′N 136°45′E
- River sources: Kiso Three Rivers, Nikkō River, Shōnai River, Tempaku River
- Ocean/sea sources: Pacific Ocean
- Basin countries: Japan
- Surface area: 1,738 km^{2} (671 sq mi)
- Average depth: 19.5 m (64 ft)
- Max. depth: 30 m (98 ft)
- Water volume: 33.9 km^{3} (8.1 cu mi)
- Islands: Centrair airport (artificial)
- Settlements: Nagoya; Yokkaichi; Tsu; Matsusaka; Ise

Ise Bay (伊勢湾, Ise-wan) is a bay located at the mouth of the Kiso Three Rivers between Mie and Aichi Prefectures in Japan. Ise Bay has an average depth of 19.5 meters (64 ft) and a maximum depth of 30 meters (98 ft). The mouth of the bay is 9 kilometers (5.6 mi) and is connected to the smaller Mikawa Bay by two channels: the Nakayama Channel and the Morosaki Channel. Mikawa Bay is subsequently joined to the Pacific Ocean by the Irako Channel, which ranges from 50–100 meters (160–330 ft) in depth.

== History and environment ==
Ise Bay derives its name from the region surrounding Ise Grand Shrine and the city of Ise, where the shrine stands. The flat coastal plain that stretches from Kuwana in northern Mie Prefecture to Ise is called the Ise Plain and this plain lies on the western shore of Ise Bay. Prior to the Meiji Period, Ise Province consisted of most of modern Mie Prefecture.

From ancient times, Ise Bay has provided the people of the surrounding regions with a rich abundance of natural resources as well as providing easy transport. As a result, unique communities developed around the bay and fishing (including Ise Ebi), pearl farming, rice crops, and manufacturing industries flourished. Nagoya Port, located on the northern shore of Ise Bay, is the largest trading port in Japan. Chubu Centrair International Airport, built on an artificial island in the bay, was opened in 2005 to serve the region.

After the end of the Second World War, the Ise Bay region contributed greatly to the rapid recovery of the post-war Japanese economy. This rapid expansion of large industry has come at a cost, though, with pollution affecting the water quality and with landfills and the like reducing the number of tidelands, seaweed beds, and other areas vital in preserving the habitat of local flora and fauna. Sea walls built to protect human habitation, particularly after the 1959 Ise-wan Typhoon, have left more and more areas virtually cut off from the sea.

Ise Bay also has three active faults: Ise Bay fault, Suzuka-oki fault and the Shiroko-noma fault. Faults near the bay are believed to be responsible for the 1586 Tenshō earthquake.

== Ise-wan Typhoon ==
On September 26, 1959, the Ise-wan Typhoon (Typhoon Vera) devastated the Ise Bay area. Rising tidal levels and pounding surf collapsed banks and inundated low-lying areas of the coast. 5,041 people were killed or missing, 38,921 were injured, and 149,187 houses were totally or partially destroyed. Estimates place the cost of the damage between 500 and 600 billion yen. The damage and loss of life caused by the Ise-wan Typhoon remains the worst recorded by a typhoon in Japan.
