= Kiso River =

River in Chūbu Prefecture, Japan

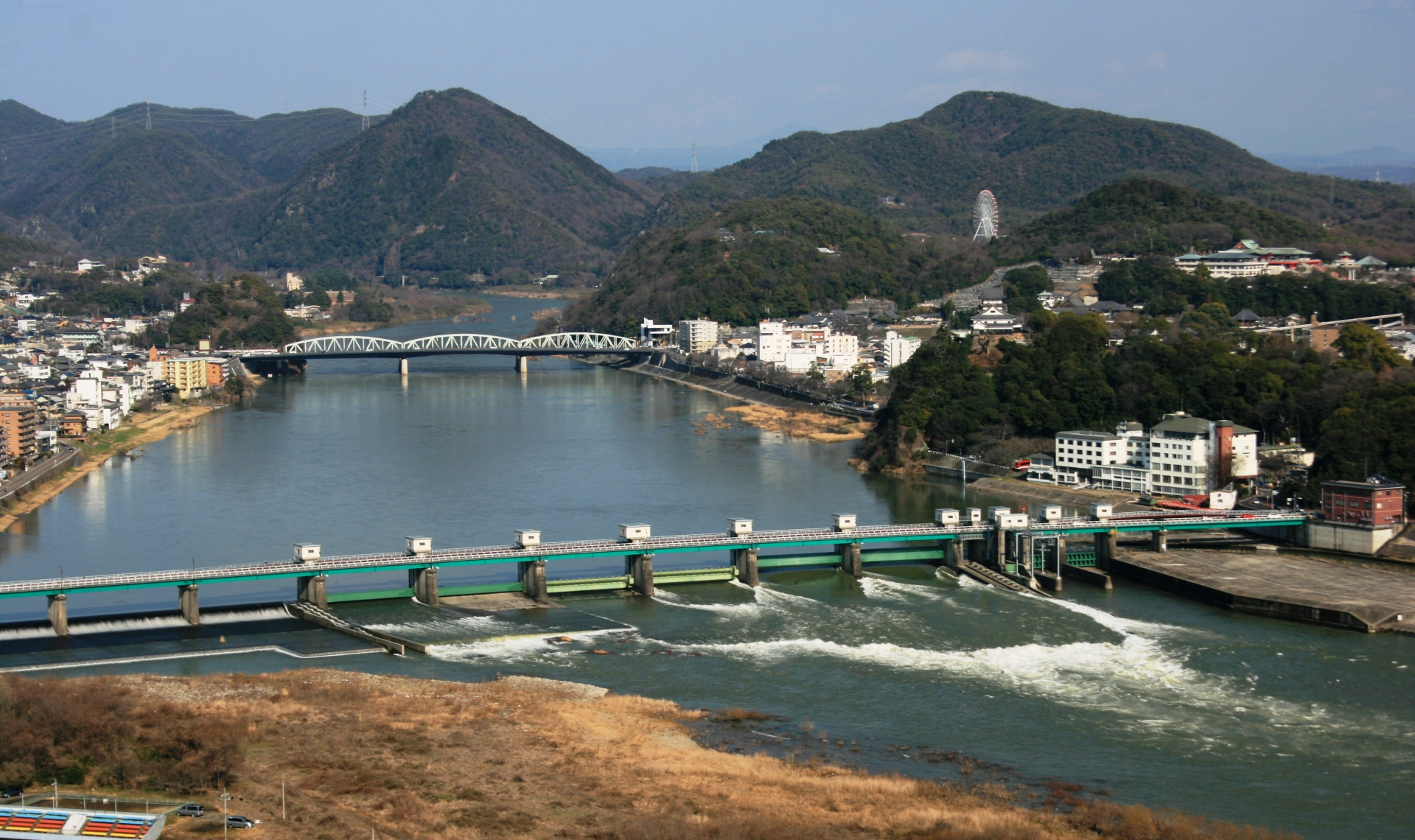
- Kiso River and bridge (Inuyamatoushukourain'oohashi) seen from Mount Igi

- Location within Japan

Location
- Country: Japan

Physical characteristics
- Source
  - location: Mount Hachimori (Nagano)
  - elevation: 2,446 m (8,025 ft)
- Mouth: Nagoya
  - location: Ise Bay
  - coordinates: 35°02′04″N 136°44′43″E
  - elevation: 0 m (0 ft)
- Length: 229 km (142 mi)
- Basin size: 5,275 km^{2} (2,037 sq mi)
- Discharge
  - average: 169 m^{3}/s (6,000 cu ft/s)

Basin features
- River system: Kiso River
- National Palace of Scenic Beauty Natural Monument

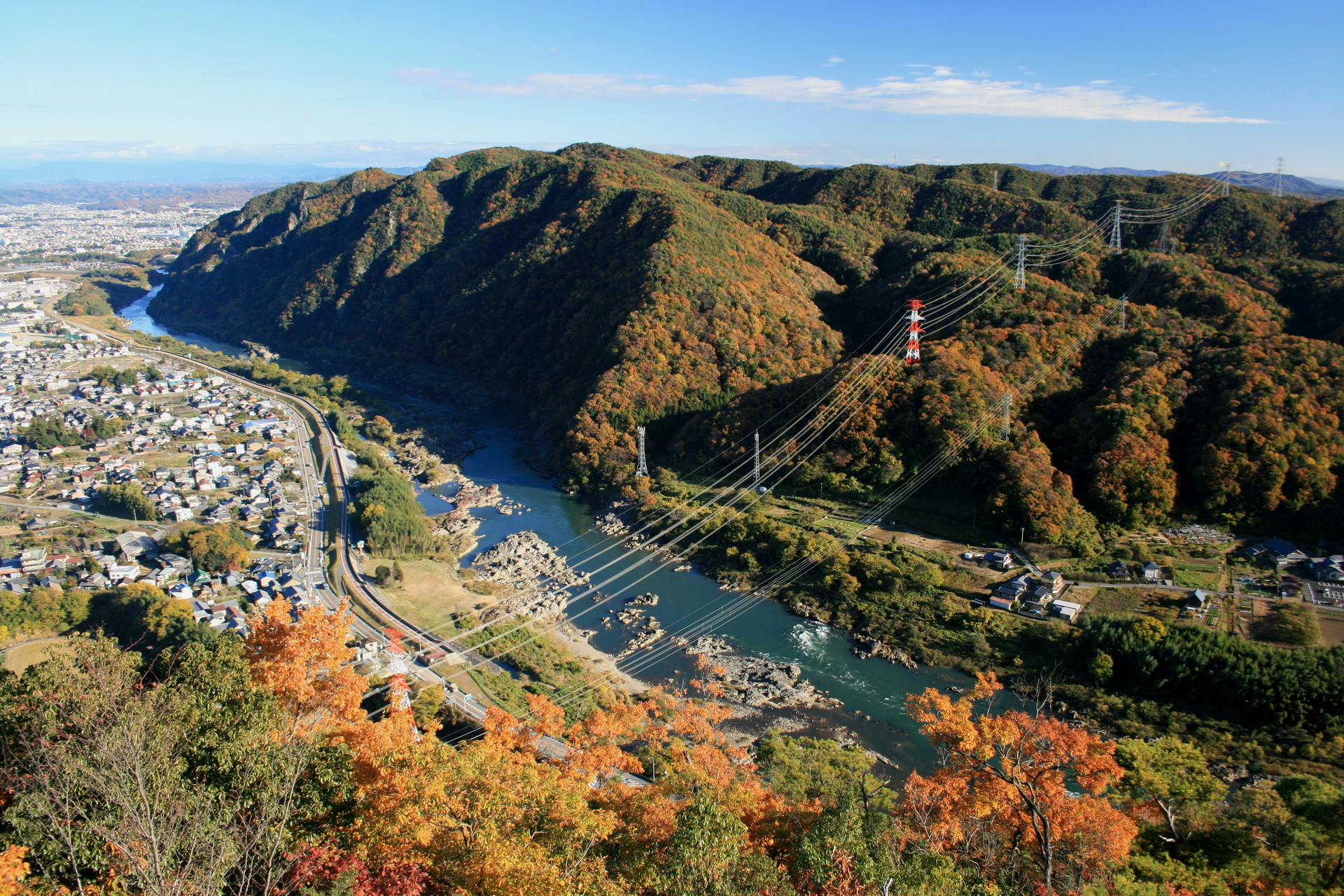
Japan Rhine seen from Sarubami Castle

The Kiso River (木曽川, Kiso-gawa) is an A class river in the Chubu region of Japan roughly 229 km (142 mi) long, and 7th longest in Japan. It is flowing through the prefectures of Nagano, Gifu, Aichi, and Mie before emptying into Ise Bay a short distance away from the city of Nagoya. It is the main river among the Kiso Three Rivers (along with the Ibi and Nagara rivers) and forms a major part of the Nōbi Plain. The valley around the upper portion of the river forms the Kiso Valley.

Parts of the Kiso River are sometimes referred to as the Japan Rhine because of its similarities to the Rhine in Europe.

== Kiso River embankment ==
The Kiso River embankment (木曽川堤, Kiso-gawa tsutsumi) was built in the Edo period and extends for 47 kilometers (29 mi) between the cities of Inuyama and Yatomi to protect against flooding. After a portion of this embankment was rebuilt following collapse due to record floods in May 1884, local volunteers brought in 1,800 saplings of sakura trees at the request of the governor of Aichi Prefecture, replacing Japanese red pine trees which had formerly lined the embankment. These cherry blossoms included many unusual varieties including some wild cherry tree species, and specifically excluded the Somei Yoshino variety that had become extremely popular all over Japan. A seven-kilometer portion of this embankment between the cities of Ichinomiya and Kōnan has been designated as both a National Place of Scenic Beauty and Natural Monument since 1927. The number of cherry trees gradually decreased due to natural attrition to less than 400 by 2001, but the city of Ichinomiya undertook a large-scale replanting campaign to bring the embankment back to its former appearance.

Other portions of the Kiso River in Inuyama, and Kakamigahara, Kani, and Sakahogi in Gifu Prefecture were designated collectively as a National Place of Scenic Beauty in 1934.

== Bridges ==
Bridge	Japanese	Route / notes
Okukiso-Ōhashi Bridge	奥木曽大橋	It was a construction road for the Misogawa Dam.
Jūō Bridge	十王橋	
Ogiso Bridge	小木曽橋	
Bise Bridge	備勢橋	
Gotanda Bridge	五反田橋	Nagano Prefectural Road; Route 26; Nagawa-Kiso Line
Kurakago Bridge	倉篭橋	
Daidou Bridge	大洞橋	
Daiichi Kisogawa Bridge (First Kiso River Bridge) (Nagano)	第1木曽川 橋梁 (長野)	JR Chuo Line
Shishiiwa Bridge	獅子岩橋	National Route 19
Suge Bridge (Old Bridge)	菅橋 (旧橋)	This abandoned road has been designated a civil engineering heritage site by the Japan Society of Civil Engineers.
Washitori Bridge	鷲取橋	National Route 19
Daini Kisogawa Bridge (Second Kiso River; Bridge) (Nagano)	第2木曽川 橋梁 (長野)	JR Chuo Line (upbound line)
Shin-Daini Kisogawa; Bridge (New Second; Kiso River Bridge)	新第2 木曽川橋梁	JR Chuo Line (downbound line)
Suge Bridge	菅橋	
Daisan Kisogawa Bridge (Third Kiso River Bridge) (Nagano)	第3木曽川 橋梁 (長野)	JR Chuo Line
Yoshida Bridge	吉田橋	Kiso Village Road
Yoshida Bridge	吉田橋	National Route 19
Daini Yamabuki Bridge (Second Yamabuki; Bridge)	第2山吹橋	National Route 19
Daiichi Yamabuki Bridge (First Yamabuki Bridge)	第1山吹橋	National Route 19
Kamiya Bridge	神谷橋	National Route 361
Yamabuki Bridge	山吹橋	National Route 19
Daiyon Kisogawa Bridge (Fourth Kiso River; Bridge)	第4 木曽川橋梁	JR Chuo Line (upbound line)
Shin-Daiyon Kisogawa; Bridge (New Fourth; Kiso River Bridge)	新第4 木曽川橋梁	JR Chuo Line (downbound line)
Tomoe Bridge	巴橋	
Aoi Bridge	葵橋	
Yoshinaka Bridge	義仲橋	
Otera Bridge	寺橋	
Hiyoshi Entei (Dam); Inspection Bridge	日義堰堤 巡視橋	The general public is not allowed to pass through.
Mukai Bridge	向橋	This bridge provides access to the Hiyoshi Sewage Treatment Plant.
Koujin Bridge	荒神橋	
Yazaki Bridge	矢崎橋	
Kiso-Ōhashi Bridge	木曽大橋	National Route 361
Sakura Bridge	桜橋	
Sekisho Bridge	関所橋	
Chūō Bridge	中央橋	
Ōte Bridge	大手橋	It has been designated a civil engineering heritage site by the Japan Society of Civil Engineers.
Gyounin Bridge; Pedestrian Bridge	行人橋 歩道橋	Pedestrian only
Gyounin Bridge	行人橋	Nagano Prefectural Road; Route 461; Kiso-Fukushima Sta. Line
Nakajima Bridge	中島橋	
Kouhan Bridge	広絆橋	
Fukushima Ōhashi Bridge	福島大橋	
Moto Bridge	元橋	Nagano Prefectural Road; Route 20 Kaida-Mitake- Fukushima Line
Nezame Power Plant; Aqueduct Bridge	寝覚発電所 水管橋	There is a roadway on top of the aqueduct.
Kakehashi-Ōhashi; Bridge	かけはし 大橋	National Route 19 (Kakehashi Bypass)
Kakehashi Bridge	かけはし	
Agematsu-Ōhashi; Bridge	あげまつ 大橋	National Route 19 (Kakehashi Bypass)
Onibuchi Bridge	鬼淵橋	Nagano Prefectural Road; Route 508; Agematsu-Nagiso Line
Ogawa Bridge	小川橋	
Ogawa Bridge (New Bridge)	小川橋 (新橋)	Nagano Prefectural Road; Route 473; Agematsu-Ontake Line
Onogaya Bridge	小野ヶ野橋	This is the access road to the Agematsu Power Plant.
Shitagawara Bridge	下河原橋	
Morohara Bridge	諸原橋	Cars cannot enter.
Momoyama Bridge	桃山橋	
Wamura Bridge	和村橋	
Masuta Bridge	満寿太橋	
Tono Ōhashi Bridge	殿大橋	
Ōkuwa Bridge	大桑橋	
Kisogawa Bridge (abandoned bridge)	木曽川橋梁 (廃橋)	Nojiri Forest Railway (abandoned line)
Nojirimukai Bridge	野尻向橋	
Adera Bridge	阿寺橋	
Futamata Bridge (Jūnikane Suspension; Bridge)	二又橋 (十二兼の 吊り橋)	Cars cannot enter.
Kakizore Bridge	柿其橋	
Takase Bridge	高瀬橋	
Momosuke Bridge	桃介橋	
Midono Bridge (Midono-Ōhashi Bridge)	三留野大橋	
Daigo Kisogawa Bridge (Fifth Kiso River Bridge)	第五 木曽川橋梁	JR Chuo Line
Mine Bridge	三根橋	Private bridge to the Yomikaki Power Plant
Nagiso-Ōhashi Bridge	南木曽大橋	National Route 19; National Route 256
Yahazu Bridge	矢筈橋	It is closed to traffic due to its age and deterioration.
Shizumo-Ōhashi Bridge	賤母大橋	National Route 19; National Route 256
Daisan Kisogawa Bridge (Third Kiso River Bridge) (Gifu)	第三木曽川 橋梁 (岐阜)	JR Chuo Line
Daini Kisogawa Bridge (Second Kiso River; Bridge) (Gifu)	第二木曽川 橋梁 (岐阜)	JR Chuo Line
Iyasaka Bridge	弥栄橋	National Route 256
Amagoishi Bridge	雨乞石橋	
Otohime Bridge (Otohime-Ōhashi Bridge)	乙姫大橋	
Daiichi Kisogawa Bridge (First Kiso River Bridge) (Gifu)	第一木曽川 橋梁 (岐阜)	JR Chuo Line
Benten Bridge	弁天橋	
Kayanoki-Ōhashi Bridge	榧の木大橋	
Tamakura-Ōhashi Bridge	玉蔵大橋	Gifu Prefectural Road; Route 6 Nakatsugawa- Tadachi Line
Kisogawa Bridge (abandoned bridge)	木曽川橋梁 (廃橋)	Kita-Ena Railway (abandoned line)
Shiroyama-Ōhashi Bridge	城山大橋	National Route 257
Mie Bridge	美恵橋	Gifu Prefectural Road; Route 410 Naegi-Ena Line
Gensai Bridge	源済橋	
Enakyō-Ōhashi Bridge	恵那峡大橋	
Ōi Dam	大井ダム	One can cross the walkway on top of the dam.
Shinonome Bridge	東雲橋	
Shinonome-Ōhashi; Bridge	東雲大橋	Gifu Prefectural Road; Route 72 Ena-Hirukawa- Higashishirakawa Line
Kasagi Bridge	笠置橋	Gifu Prefectural Road; Route 68; Ena-Shirakawa Line
Takenami Bridge	武並橋	National Route 418
Gogatsu Bridge	五月橋	Gifu Prefectural Road; Route 352; Ōnishi-Mizunami Line Vehicle access is not possible.
Kowazawa Bridge	小和沢橋	Gifu Prefectural Road; Route 358 Ijiri-Yaotsu Line ＊Cars cannot enter.
Nozomi Bridge	のぞみ橋	This is adjacent to Kowazawa Bridge.
Maruyama-Ōhashi Bridge	丸山大橋	Gifu Prefectural Road; Route 358 Ijiri-Yaotsu Line
Sosuikyō Bridge	蘇水峡橋	Gifu Prefectural Road; Route 358 Ijiri-Yaotsu Line
Yaotsu-Ōhashi Bridge	八百津大橋	Gifu Prefectural Road; Route 358 Ijiri-Yaotsu Line
Yaotsu Bridge	八百津橋	Gifu Prefectural Road; Route 83; Tajimi-Shirakawa Line
Inaba Bridge	稲葉橋	
Kaneyama Bridge	兼山橋	Gifu Prefectural Road; Route 381; Tajimi-Yaotsu Line
Shimowatari Bridge	下渡橋	Gifu Prefectural Road; Route 351; Mitake-Kawabe Line
Kisogawa Bridge	木曽川橋	Tokai-Kanjo Expressway (National Route 475)
Kawai-Ōhashi Bridge	川合大橋	Gifu Prefectural Road; Route 64; Kani-Kanayama Line
Kisogawa Bridge	木曽川橋梁	JR Taita Line
Shin-Ōta Bridge	新太田橋	National Route 21; National Route 248
Ōta Bridge	太田橋	
Chūnō-Ōhashi Bridge	中濃大橋	National Route 41
Isshiki-Ōhashi Bridge	一色大橋	This bridge is over the Anabranch.
Inuyama Bridge (railway bridge)	犬山橋 (鉄道橋)	Meitetsu Inuyama Line
Inuyama Bridge	犬山橋	Aichi/Gifu Prefectural; Road Route 27 Kasugai- Kakamigahara Line
Rain Ōhashi Bridge	ライン大橋	
Aigi-Ōhashi Bridge	愛岐大橋	Aichi/Gifu Prefectural; Road Route 17; Kōnan-Seki Line
Kakamigahara-Ōhashi; Bridge	各務原大橋	
Kawashima-Ōhashi; Bridge	川島大橋	Gifu Prefectural Road; Route 180; Matsubara-Imojima Line ＊Under reconstruction
Heisei-Kawashima; Bridge	平成川島橋	Gifu Prefectural Road; Route 93; Kawashima-Miwa Line
Kisogawa-Honsen; Bridge (Kiso Main River Bridge)	木曽川本川 橋	Tokai-Hokuriku; Expressway
Shin-Kisogawa Bridge	新木曽川橋	National Route 22
Kisogawa Bridge	木曽川橋梁	JR Tokaido Line
Kisogawa Bridge	木曽川橋梁	Meitetsu Nagoya Line
Kisogawa Bridge	木曽川橋	Gifu/Aichi Prefectural; Road Route 14; Gifu-Inazawa Line
Binō-Ōhashi Bridge	尾濃大橋	Gifu/Aichi Prefectural; Road Route 193; Ōgaki-Kōnan Line
Nōbi-Ōhashi Bridge	濃尾大橋	Gifu/Aichi Prefectural; Road Route 18; Ōgaki-Ichinomiya Line
Kisogawa Bridge	木曽川橋	Meishin Expressway
Kisogawa Bridge	木曽川橋梁	Tokaido Shinkansen
Shin-Nōbi-Ōhashi; Bridge	新濃尾大橋	Gifu/Aichi Prefectural; Road Route 135; Hashima-Inazawa Line
Magai-Ōhashi Bridge	馬飼大橋	Gifu/Aichi Prefectural; Road Route 134; Kuwabara-Sobue Line
Tōkai-Ōhashi Bridge	東海大橋	Aichi/Gifu Prefectural; Road Route 8 Tsushima-Nanno Line
Tatsuta-Ōhashi Bridge	立田大橋	Aichi/Gifu/Mie; Prefectural Road; Route 125 Saya-Tado Line
Kisogawa Bridge	木曽川橋	Higashi-Meihan Expressway
Kisogawa Bridge	木曽川橋梁	JR Kansai Line
Kisogawa Bridge	木曽川橋梁	Kintetsu Nagoya Line
Owari-Ōhashi Bridge	尾張大橋	National Route 1
Kisogawa-Ōhashi; Bridge	木曽川大橋	National Route 23
Wangan-Kisogawa; Bridge (Bayside Kiso River; Bridge)	湾岸 木曽川橋	Isewangan Expressway

== See also ==
- Japanese cruiser Kiso
