= Mino Kokubun-ji =

Buddhist temple in Gifu Prefecture, Japan

Coordinates: 35°23′05″N 136°33′05″E

Mino Kokubun-ji 美濃国分寺
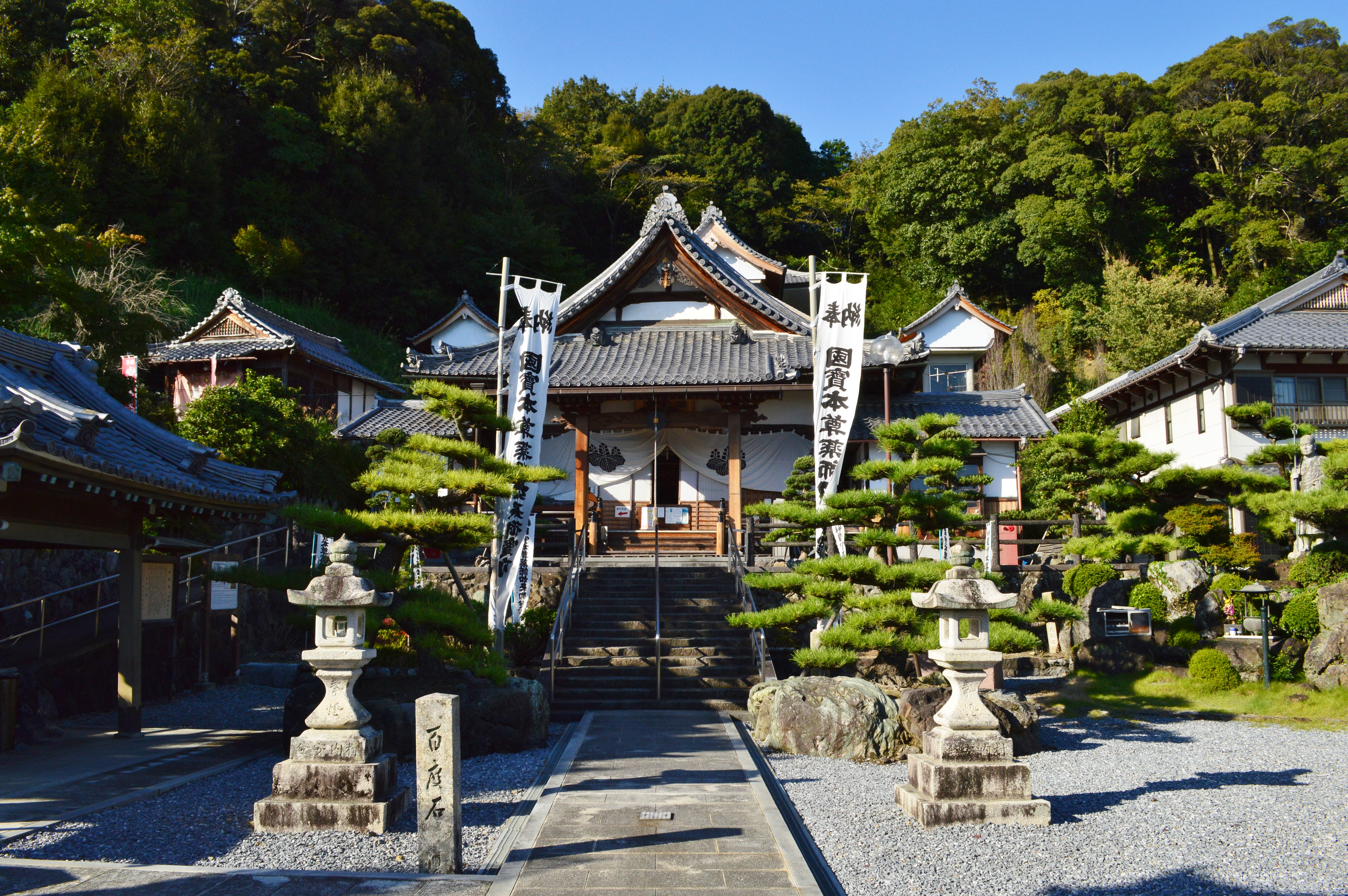
- Mino Kokubun-ji Hondō

- Mino Kokubun-ji Mino Kokubun-ji (Japan)

Religion
- Affiliation: Buddhist
- Deity: Yakushi Nyōrai
- Rite: Shingon

Location
- Location: 419 Aono-chō, Ōgaki-shi, Gifu-ken 503-2227
- Country: Japan
- Interactive map of Mino Kokubun-ji 美濃国分寺

Architecture
- Founder: Emperor Shōmu
- Completed: c.741

Website
- Official website
- National Important Cultural Property National Historic Site of Japan

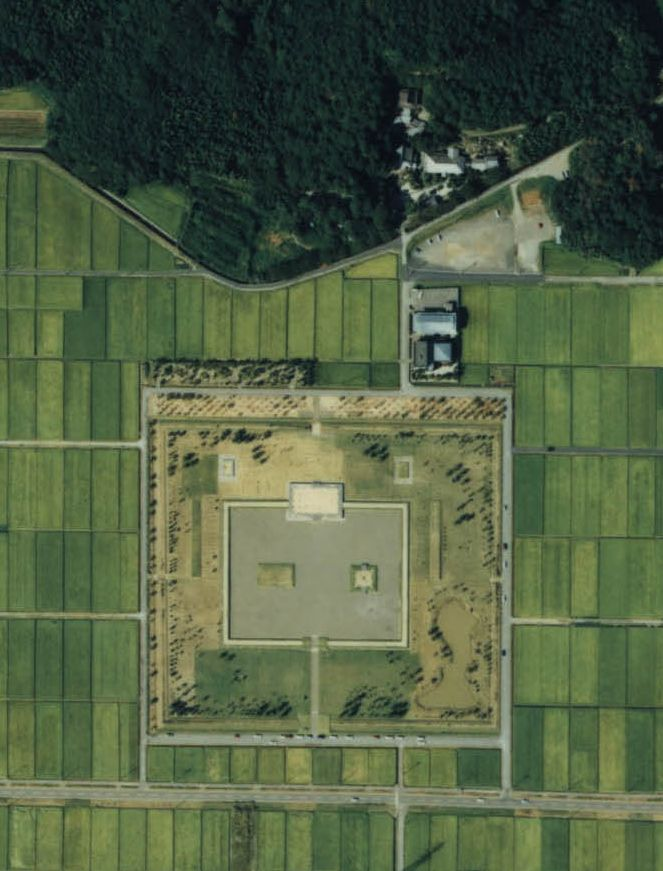
Mino Kokubun-ji ruins

Mino Kokubun-ji (美濃国分寺) is a Buddhist temple in the Aono neighborhood of the city of Ōgaki, Gifu, Japan. It belongs to the Kōyasan Shingon-shū sect and its honzon is a statue of Yakushi Nyōrai. It is one of the few surviving provincial temples established by Emperor Shōmu during the Nara period (710–794). Due to this connection, the foundation stones of the Nara period temple now located to the south of the present day complex were designated as a National Historic Site in 1916.

== History ==
The Shoku Nihongi records that in 741, as the country recovered from a major smallpox epidemic, Emperor Shōmu ordered that a monastery and nunnery be established in every province, the kokubunji (国分寺). These temples were built to a semi-standardized template, and served both to spread Buddhist orthodoxy to the provinces, and to emphasize the power of the Nara period centralized government under the Ritsuryō system.

The Mino Kokubun-ji is located in western Gifu Prefecture, a short distance to the west of the present-day downtown of Ōgaki. The location was near the ichinomiya of Mino Province, the Nangū Taisha, the Hiruiōzuka Kofun and the ruins of the Mino Provincial Capital. The exact date of the temple's foundation is unknown; but is believed that work started around 741 AD and was completed by the 750s. However, the remains of a temple from the Hakuhō period have been found to overlap the ruins of the Nara period Mino Kokunbun-ji, so it is likely that the temple was a repurposed clan temple of a local powerful clan.According to the temple's own (and unsubstantiated) legend, Gyōki visited this area in person, carved a statue of Yakushi Nyorai and founded the temple.

Per historical records, the Mino Kokubun-ji was repaired in 766, received a donation of rice in 770, and suffered from extensive damage due to a storm in 775. The original temple was destroyed by a fire in 887, and although reconstructed, disappears from history by the end of the 12th century.

The site of the original temple has been known since antiquity, and forms a compound 230 meters east-to west by 205 meters north-to-south. The foundations of the Kondō were discovered in 1916, and the site was extensively excavated from 1968 to 1979. The arrangement of buildings mirrored that of Hokki-ji in Ikaruga, Nara, with the Kondō in the west and the Pagoda in the east, both of which were in a courtyard formed by the cloister which connected the Lecture Hall with the Middle Gate. This deviated from the standard layout of most kokubunji temples, and indicates that probability that the foundation of this temple was from before the establishment of the kokubunji system.

The present temple was founded in 1615 just to the north of the ancient ruins. The temple's honzon, a seated Yakushi Nyōrai statue is 3.04 meters tall and was carved from a single block of keyaki wood. Although temple legend states that this statue was carved by the famed priest Gyōki in the Nara period, stylistically, this statue dates from the late 11th century and was extensively repaired in the Edo period. It is a national Important Cultural Property of Japan. In1615, a priest claimed to have excavated this statue from the ground and built the present Mino Kokubun-ji on the site.

Numerous roof tiles were recovered from the site, and the kilns where these tiles were made has been located in the hills to the northeast of the temple ruins. The site of these kilns was included within the National Historic Site designation in 1921. As this site is a rare completely intact example of a kokubunji, the National Historic Site designation was expanded in 1971 and again in 1974 and 2019. A museum was opened on the site by Ōgaki city in 1982. The entire site was opened to the public as an archaeological park in 2007. A decorated earthenware bowl (now kept at the Ogaki Museum of History and Folklore) and an earthenware pagoda (now kept at the Kyoto National Museum have been designated as Tangible Cultural Properties of Ogaki City.

The Mino Kokubun-ji is located approximately 3.5 kilometers northwest of Tarui Station or 4.4 kilometers northwest of Arao Station, both on the JR East Tōkaidō Main Line.

== Cultural Properties ==
=== National Important Cultural Properties ===
- Wooden statue of seated Yakushi Nyorai (木造薬師如来坐像), Heian period; It is a large statue made from a single piece of zelkova wood, measuring 304.8 cm in height, 112.5 cm in knee width, and 22.7 cm in knee height. Temple tradition attributes it to the Nara period, and that Gyoki himself carved it from a large zelkova tree as the principal image of Mino Kokubun-ji. The actual date of creation is thought to be around the 11th century, and it was partially repaired in the late Edo period.

== Gallery ==
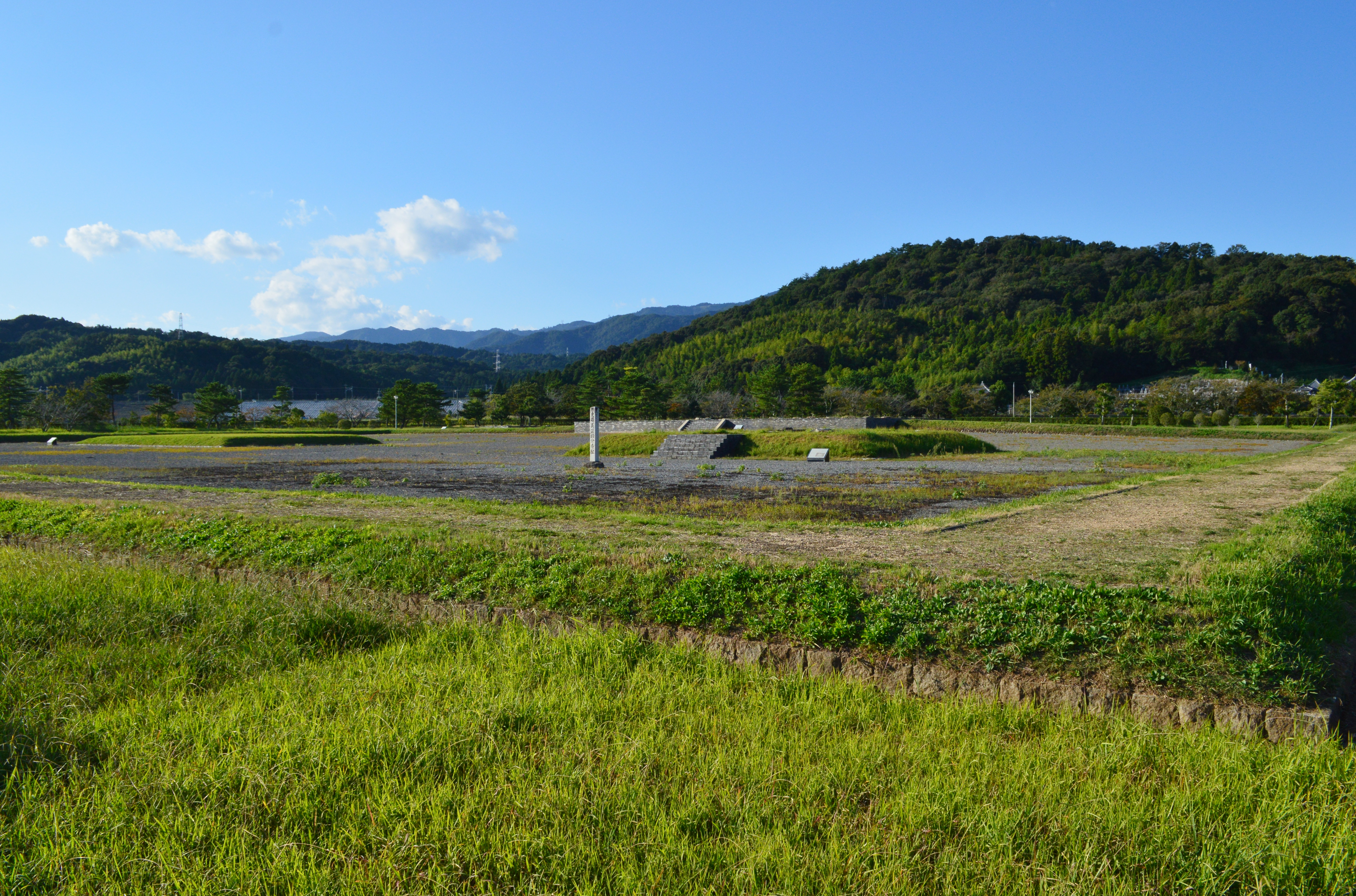
Panoramic review

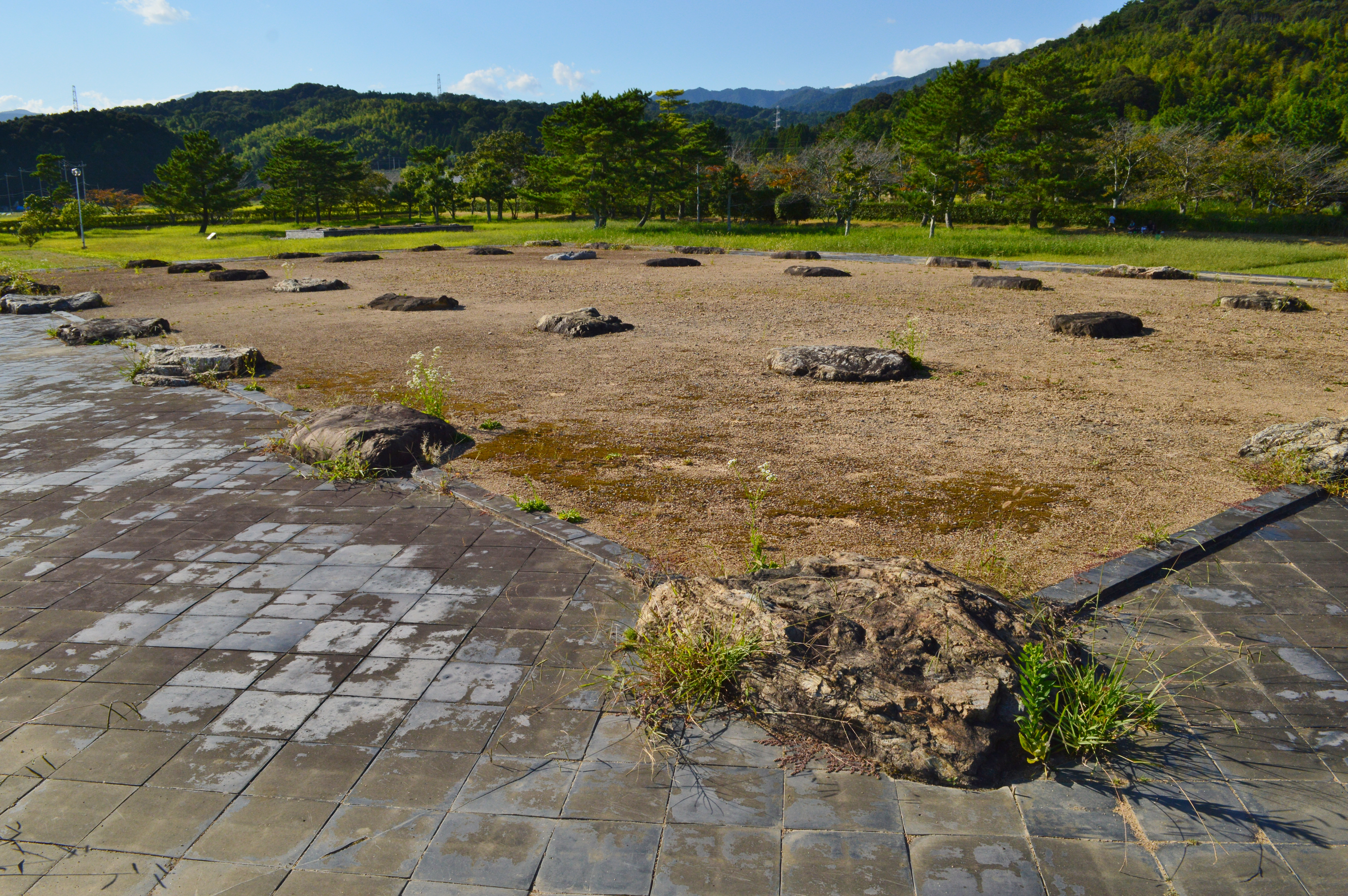
Ruins of the Kondo

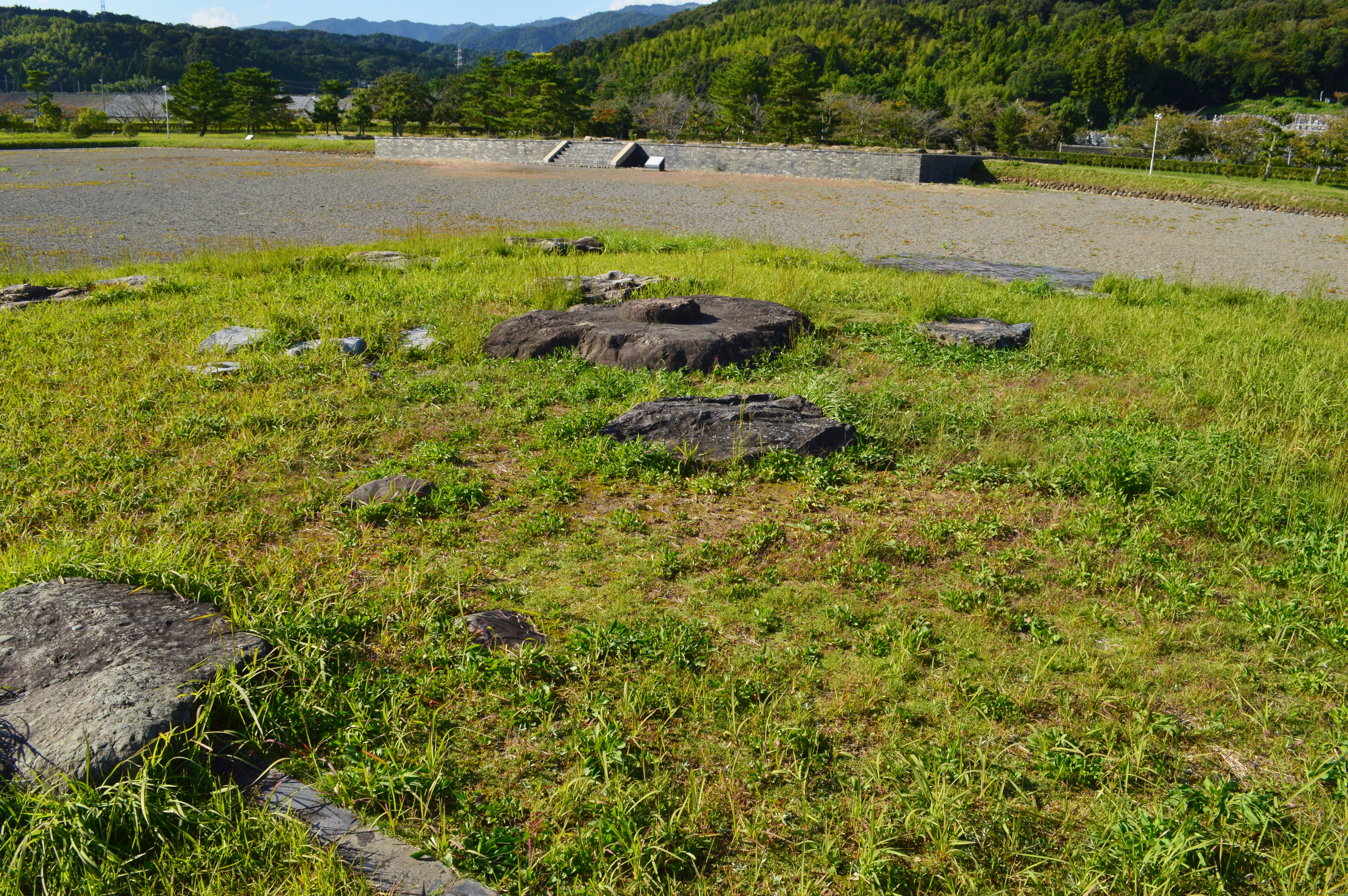
Base of the Pagoda

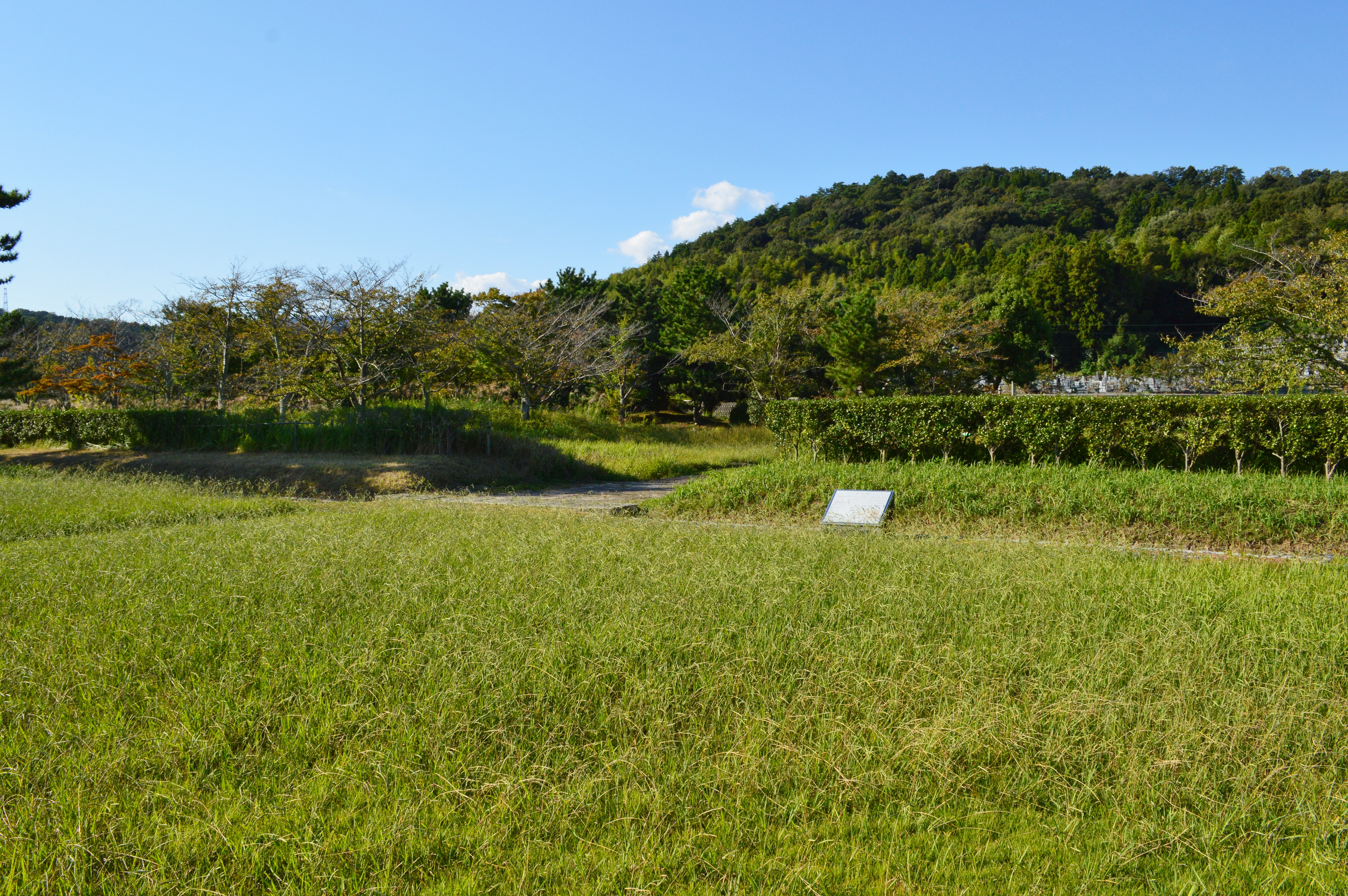
Ruins of the Lecture Hall

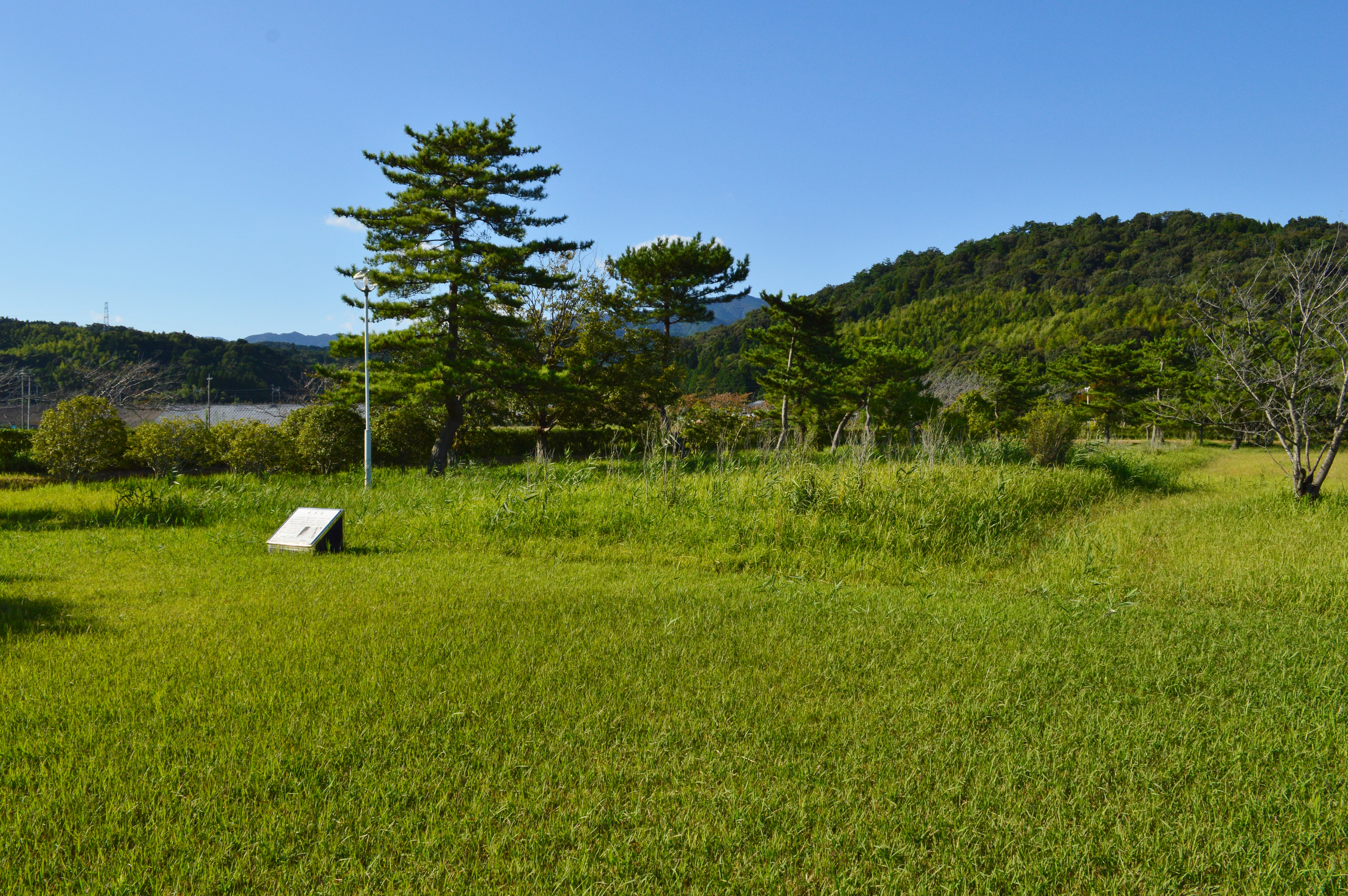
Western monk's cells

Ruins of the Kyōzō

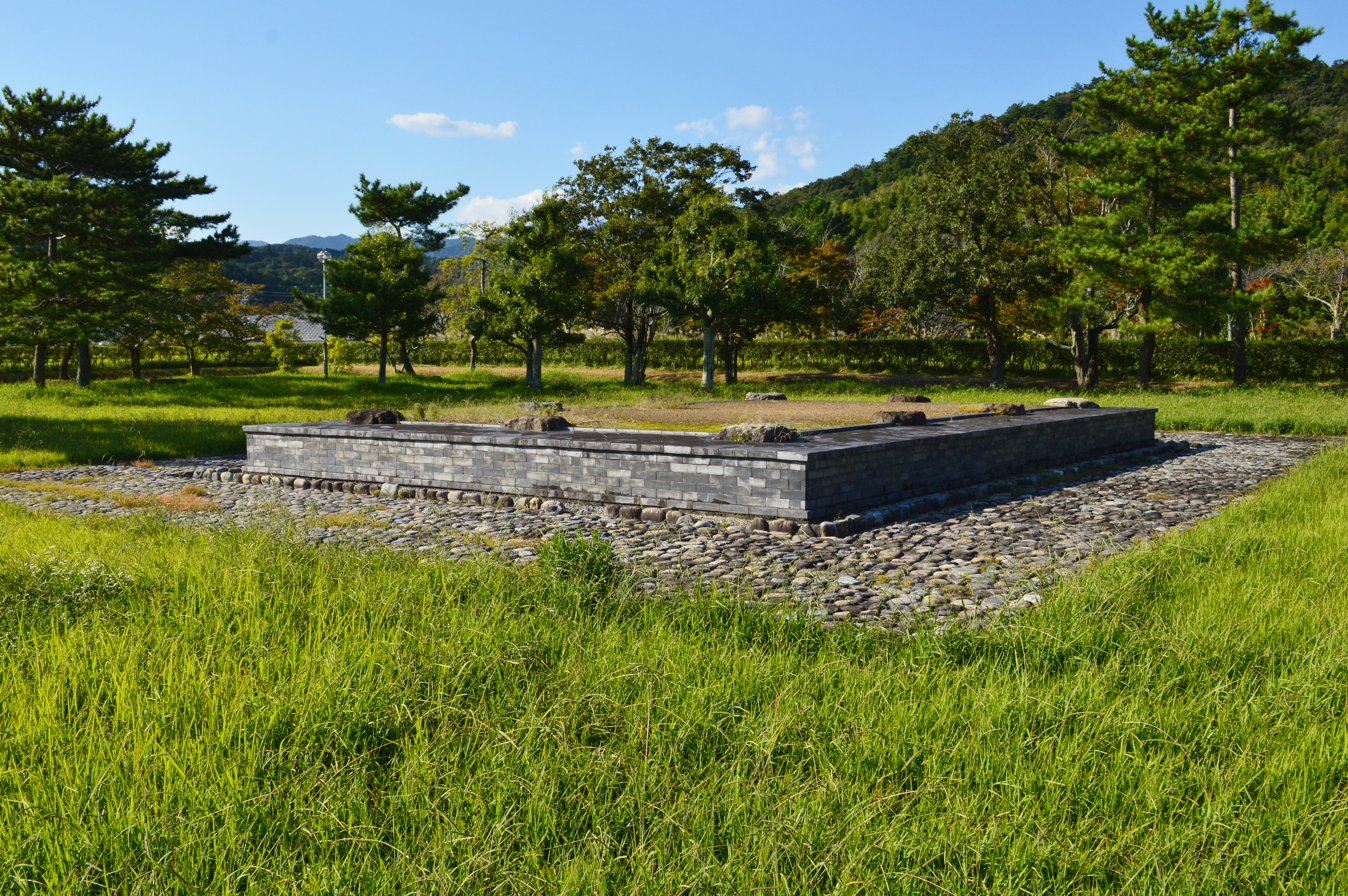
Ruins of the bonshō.

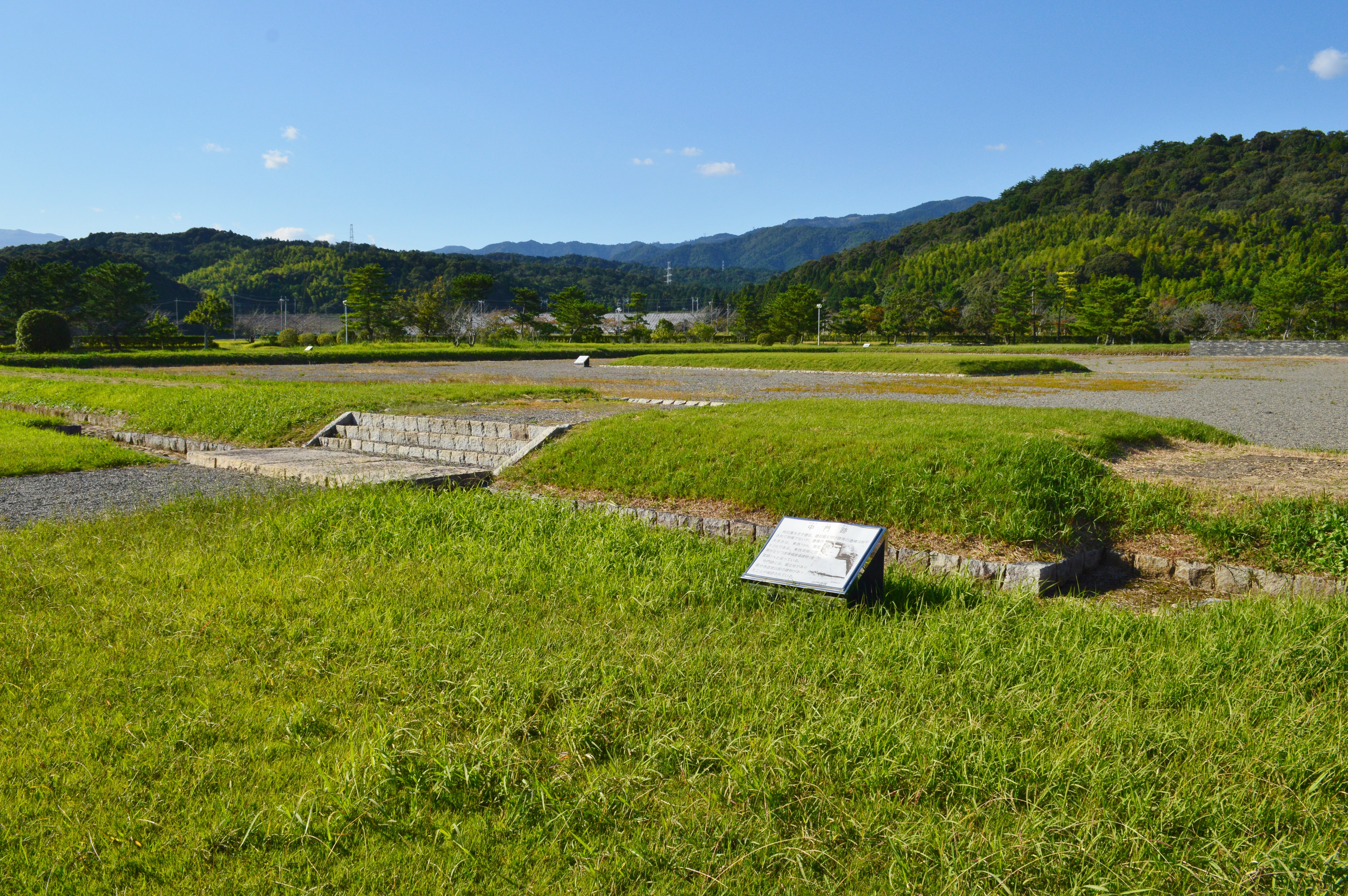
Ruins of the Middle Gate

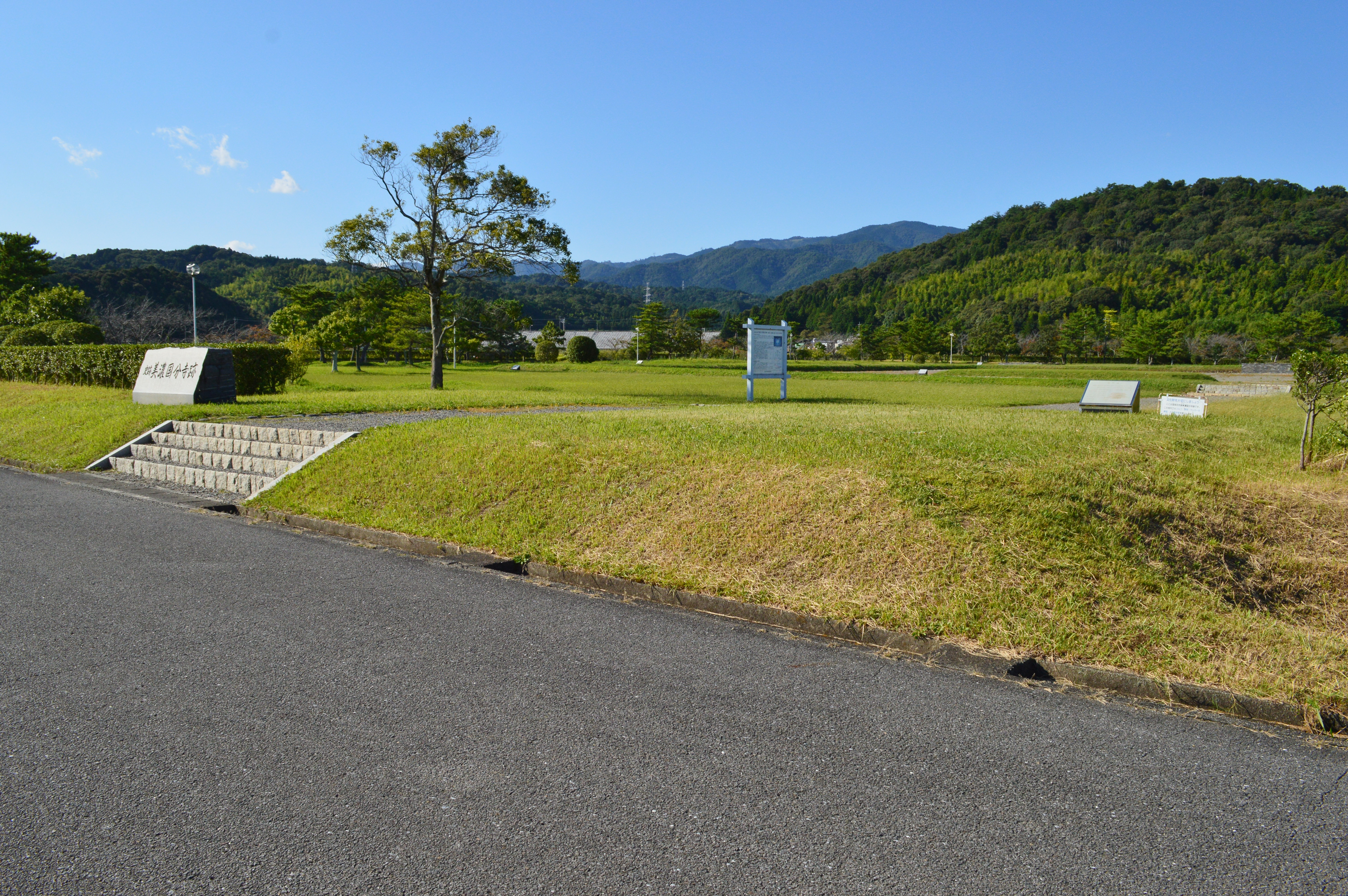
Ruins of the South Gate

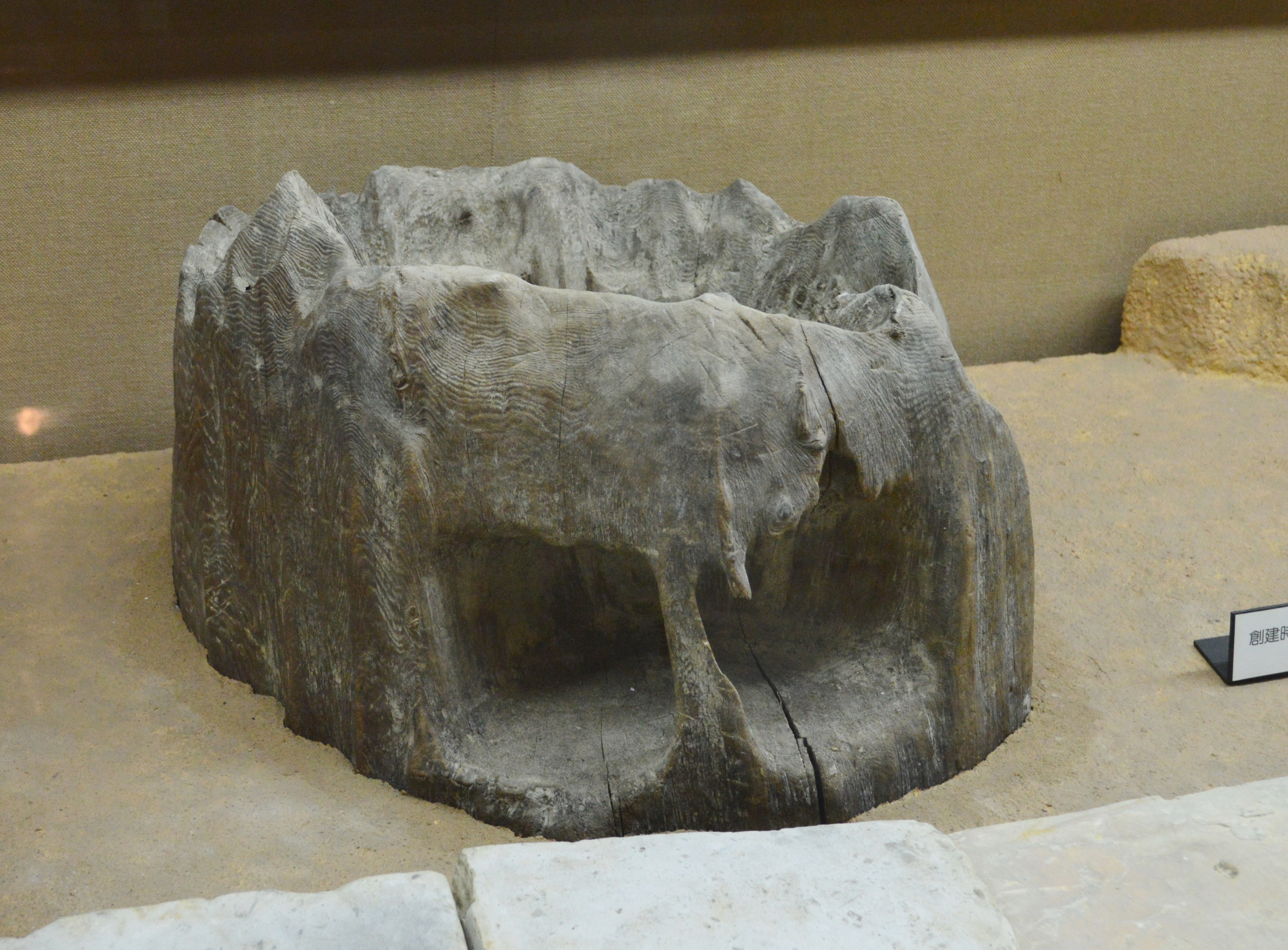
One of the original building posts

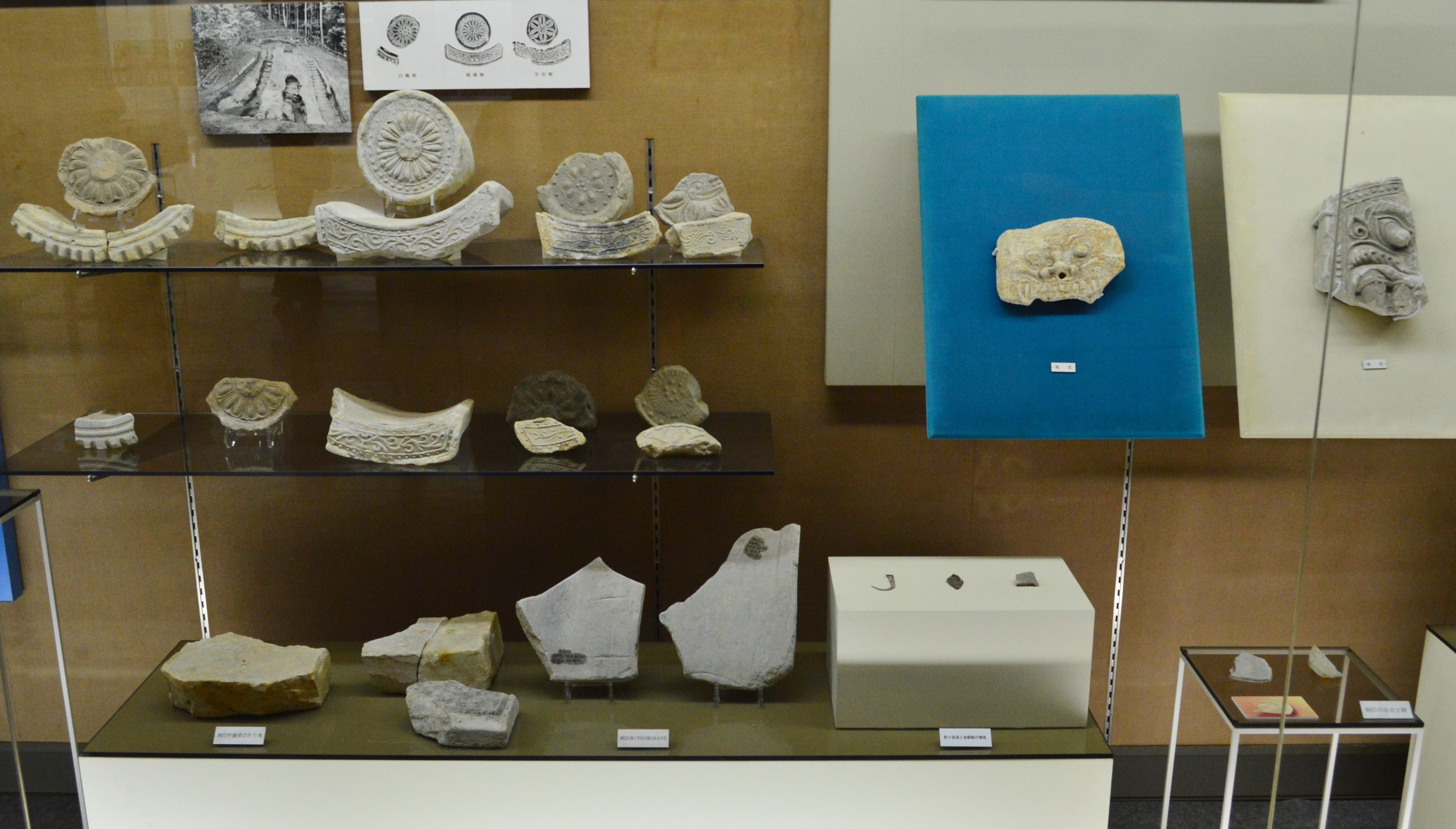
Roof tile shards

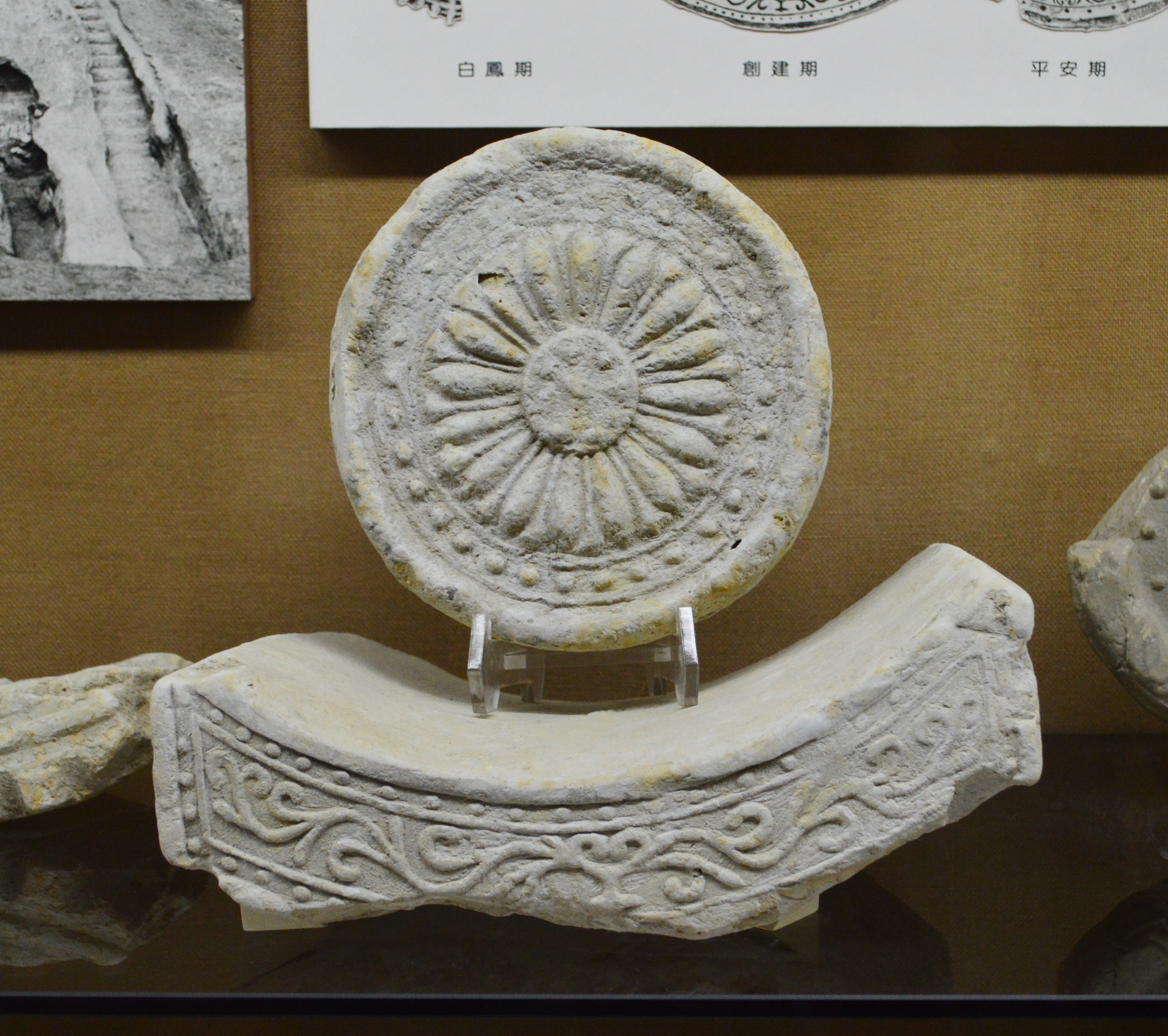
Roof tiles

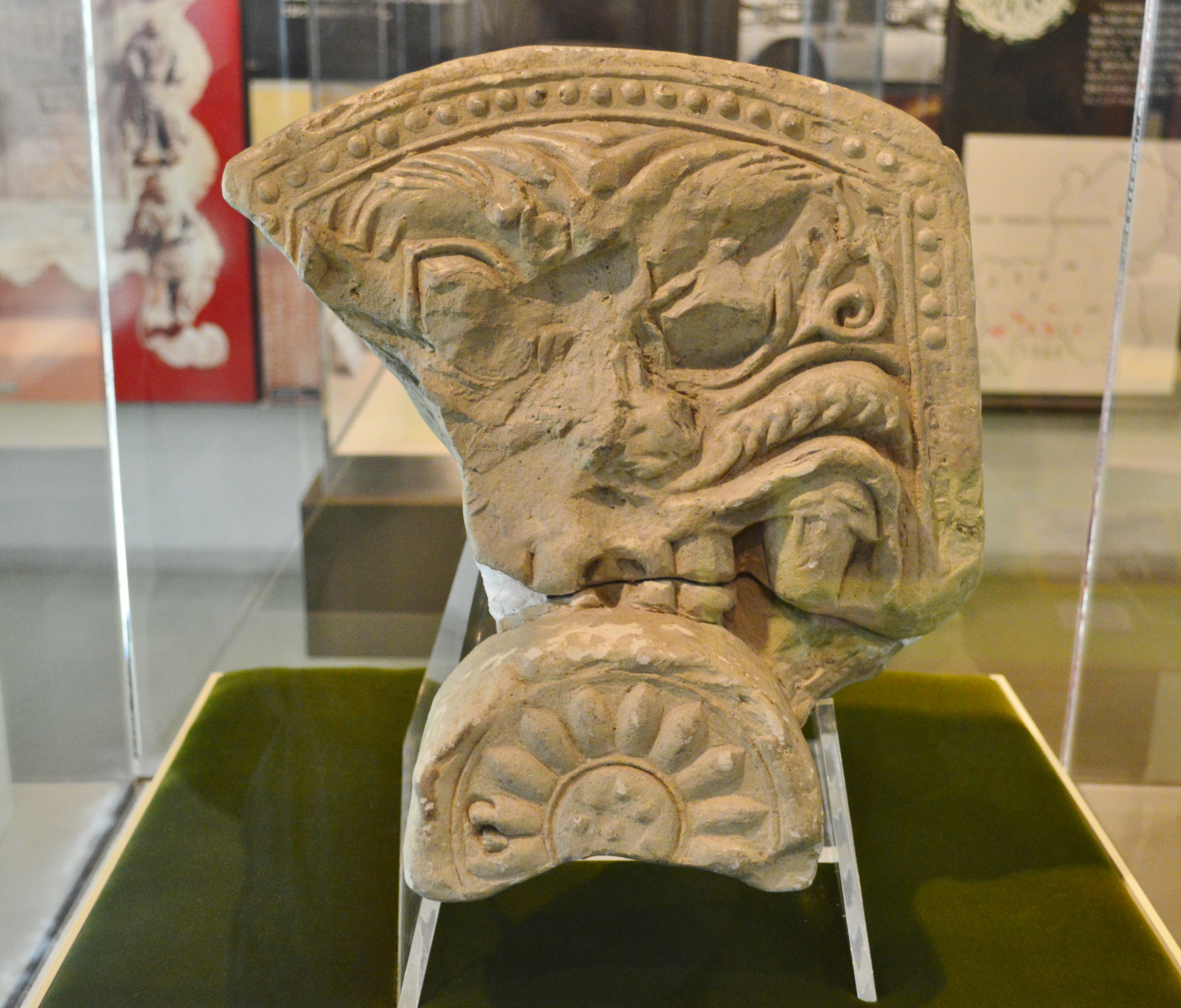
Onigawara tile

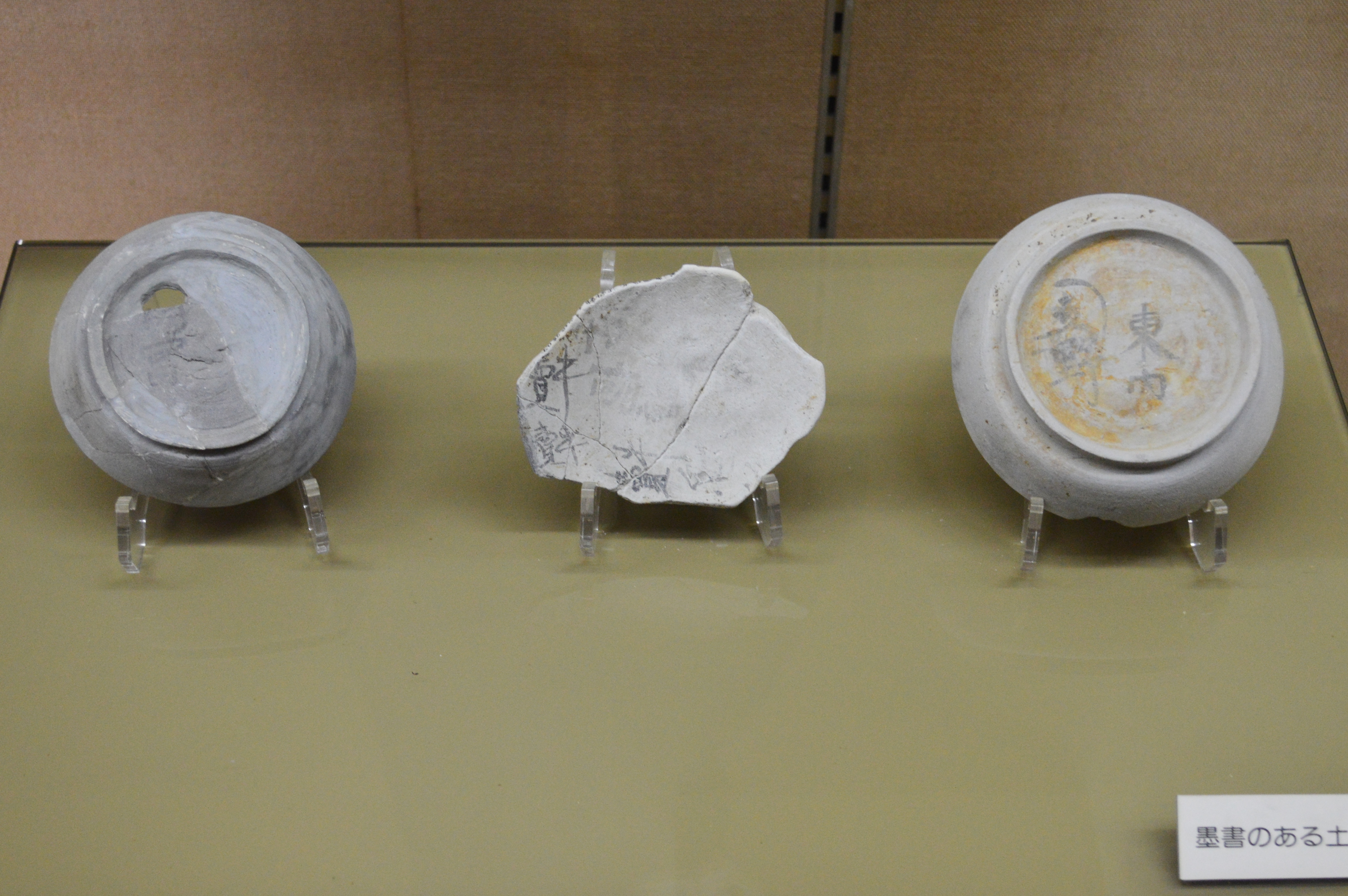
Ink inscribed pottery

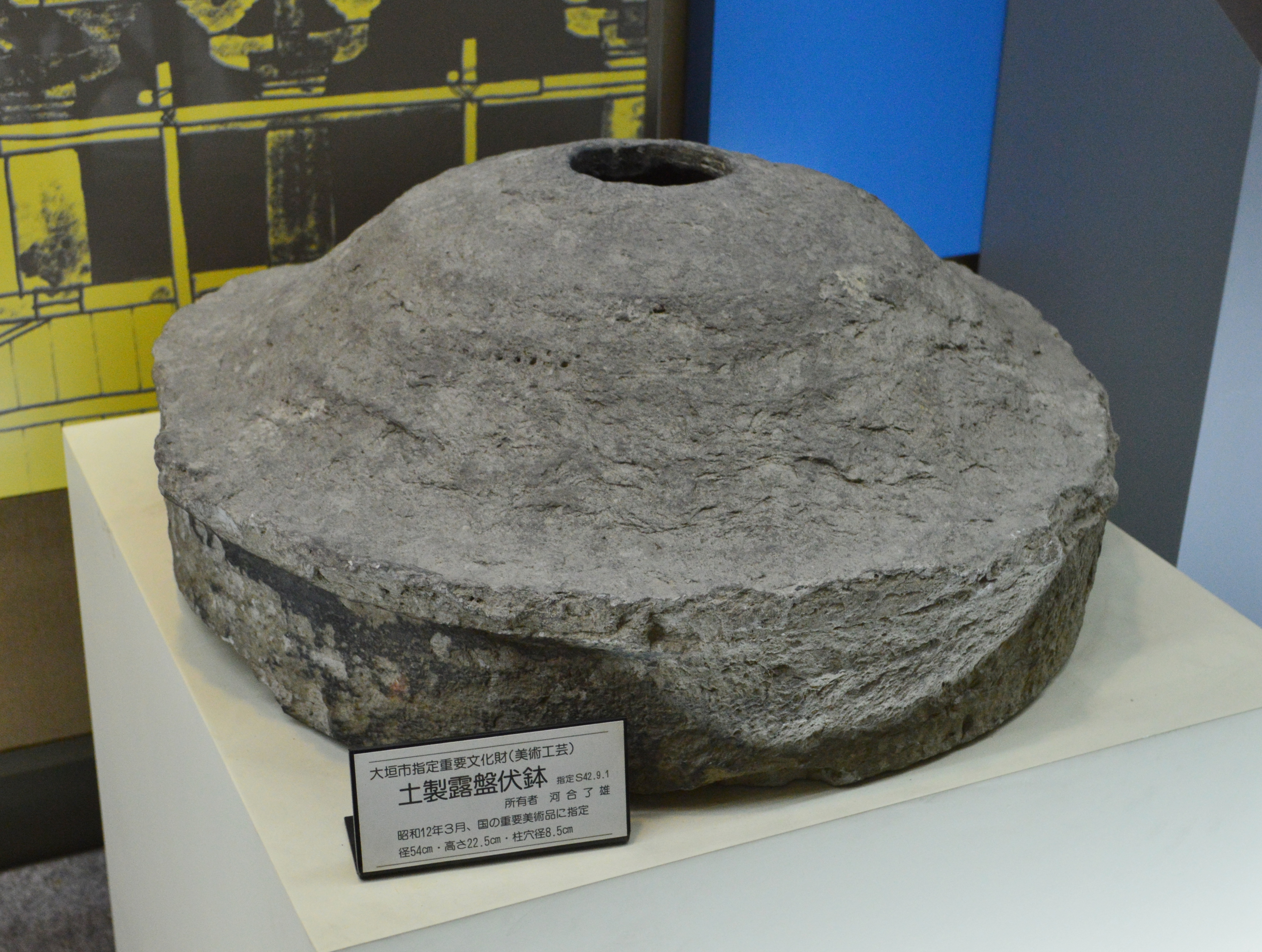
earthernware owl

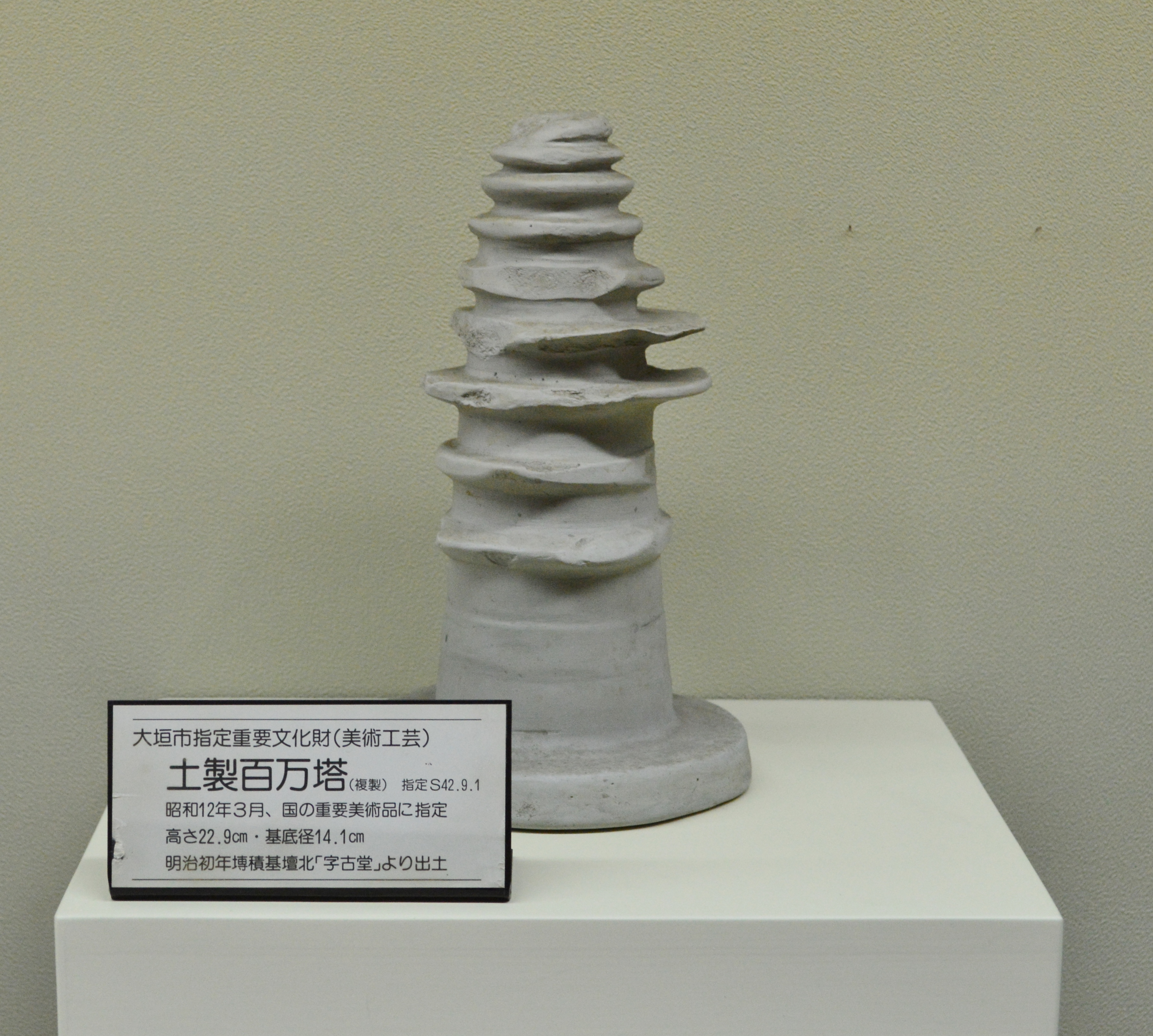
Votive stupa

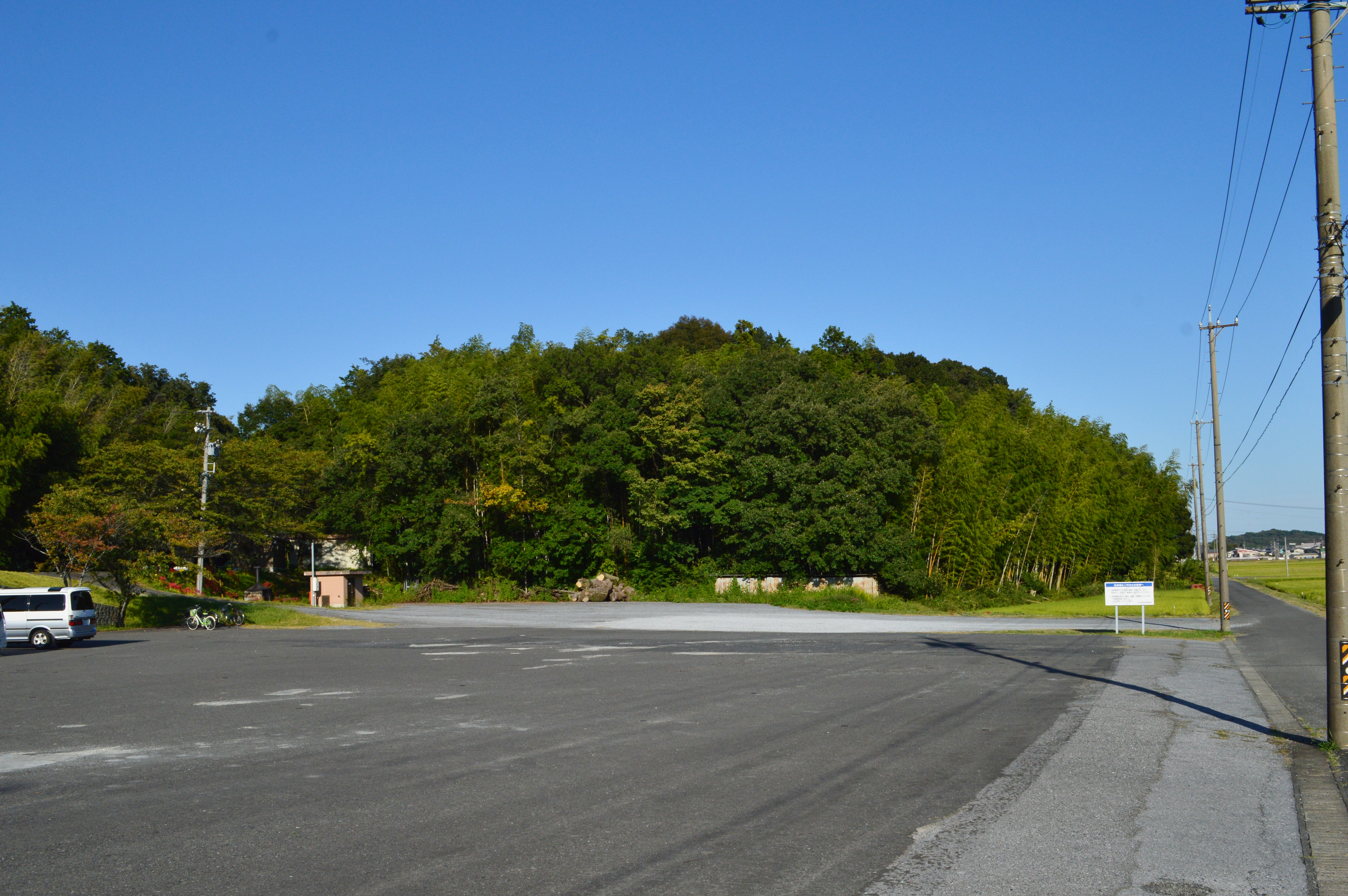
Site of the roof tile kilns

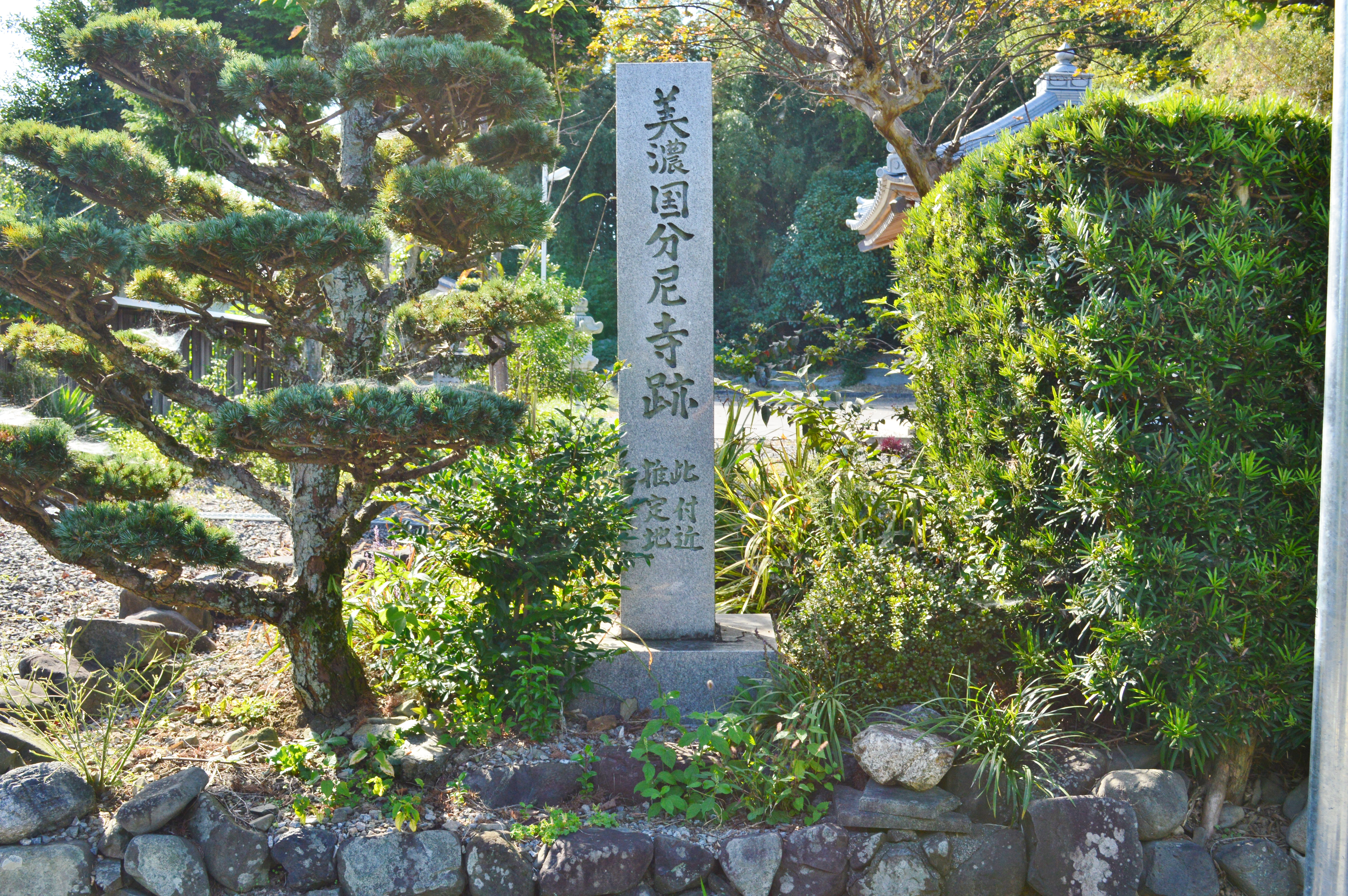
Mino Kokubun-niji marker

== Mino Kokubun-niji ==
The site of the provincial nunnery associated with the Mino Kokubun-ji has bee located in the Hirao neighborhood of the town of Tarui, Gifu. The site is located between the Mino Kokufu site and the Mino Kokubun-ji site, and the excavated roof tiles have the same pattern as the Mino Kokubun-ji . Excavations have been conducted since 2004, and the foundations of the building have been discovered. The site is now marked by a stone monument.

== See also ==
- List of Historic Sites of Japan (Gifu)
- provincial temple
