= Sekigahara Station =

Railway station in Sekigahara, Gifu Prefecture, Japan

CA79 Sekigahara Station 関ヶ原駅
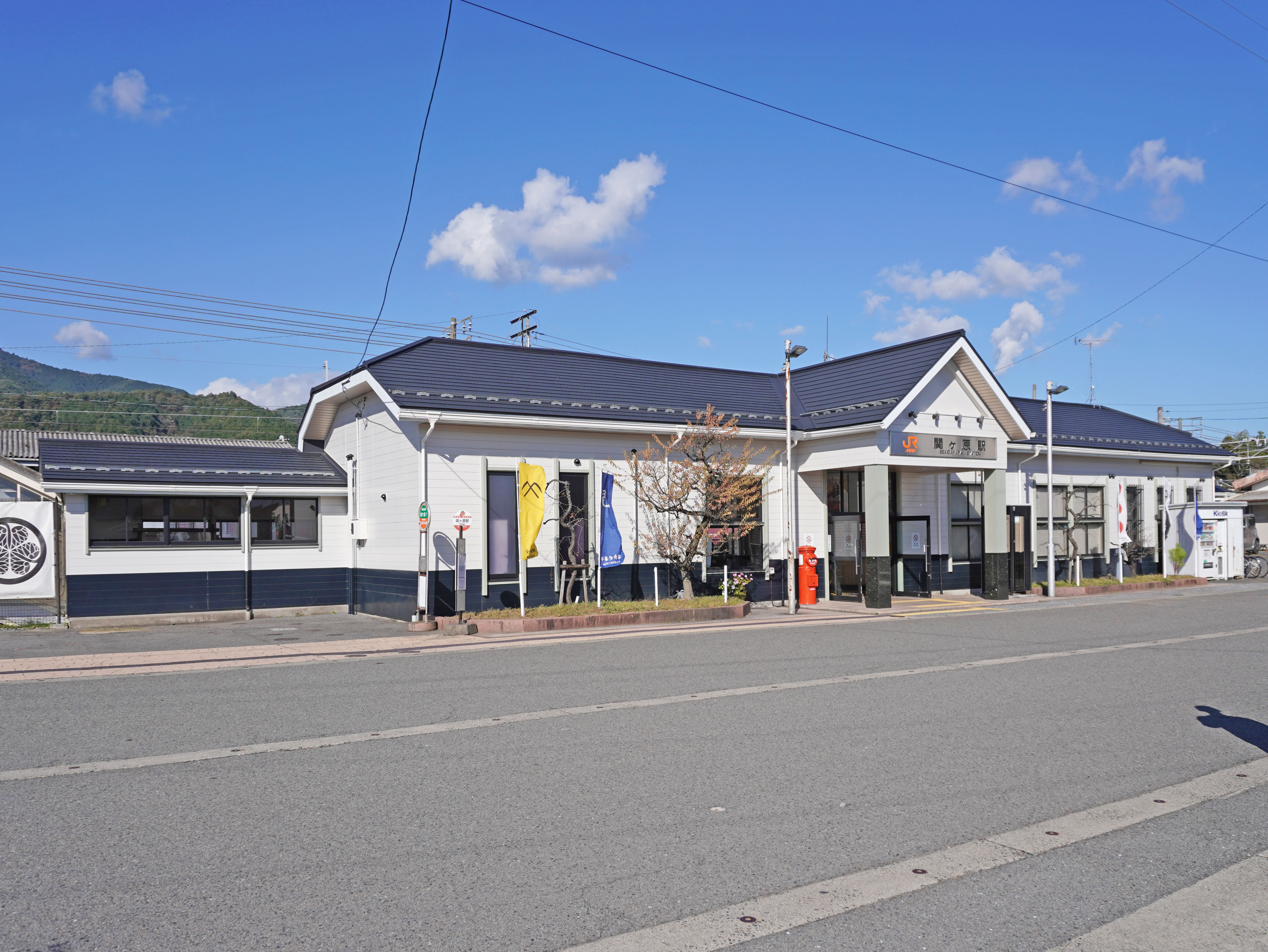
- Sekigahara Station in November 2022

General information
- Location: Sekigahara, Sekigahara-cho, Fuwa-gun, Gifu-ken 503-1501; Japan
- Coordinates: 35.3636985°N 136.4707732°E
- Operator: JR Central
- Line: Tōkaidō Main Line
- Distance: 423.8 km from Tokyo
- Platforms: 2 island platforms
- Tracks: 4

Other information
- Status: Staffed (Midori no Madoguchi)

History
- Opened: May 1, 1883

Passengers
- 2023–2024: 1,699 daily
Location
- Location within Gifu Prefecture Location within Japan

Sekigahara Station (関ヶ原駅, Sekigahara-eki) is a railway station in the town of Sekigahara, Fuwa District, Gifu Prefecture, Japan, operated by Central Japan Railway Company (JR Tōkai).

== Lines ==
Sekigahara Station is served by the JR Tōkai Tōkaidō Line, and is located 423.8 rail kilometers from the official starting point of the line at Tokyo.

== Station layout ==
Sekigagara Station has two ground-level island platforms connected by a footbridge. The station has a Midori no Madoguchi staffed ticket office.

=== Platforms ===
1	■ Tōkaidō Line	for Maibara and Kyōto
2	■ Tōkaidō Line	starting Sekigahara for Ōgaki and Nagoya
3	■ Tōkaidō Line	(passing trains only)
4	■ Tōkaidō Main Line	for Ōgaki and Nagoya

== Adjacent stations ==
«	Service	»
Central Japan Railway Company
Tōkaidō Main Line
Limited Express "Hida": Does not stop at this station
Tarui	Special Rapid	Kashiwabara
Tarui	New Rapid	Kashiwabara
Tarui	Rapid	Kashiwabara
Tarui	Sectional Rapid	Kashiwabara
Tarui	Local	Kashiwabara

== History ==
Sekigahara Station opened on May 1, 1883. The station was absorbed into the JR Tōkai network upon the privatization of the Japanese National Railways (JNR) on April 1, 1987.

Station numbering was introduced to the section of the Tōkaidō Line operated by JR Central in March 2018; Sekigahara Station was assigned station number CA79.

== Passenger statistics ==
In fiscal 2016, the station was used by an average of 1005 passengers daily (boarding passengers only).

== Surrounding area ==
- Sekigahara Town Hall
- site of the Battle of Sekigahara
- National Route 21
- National Route 365

== See also ==
- List of railway stations in Japan
