= Tarui Ichirizuka =

- 垂井一里塚 (Japanese)
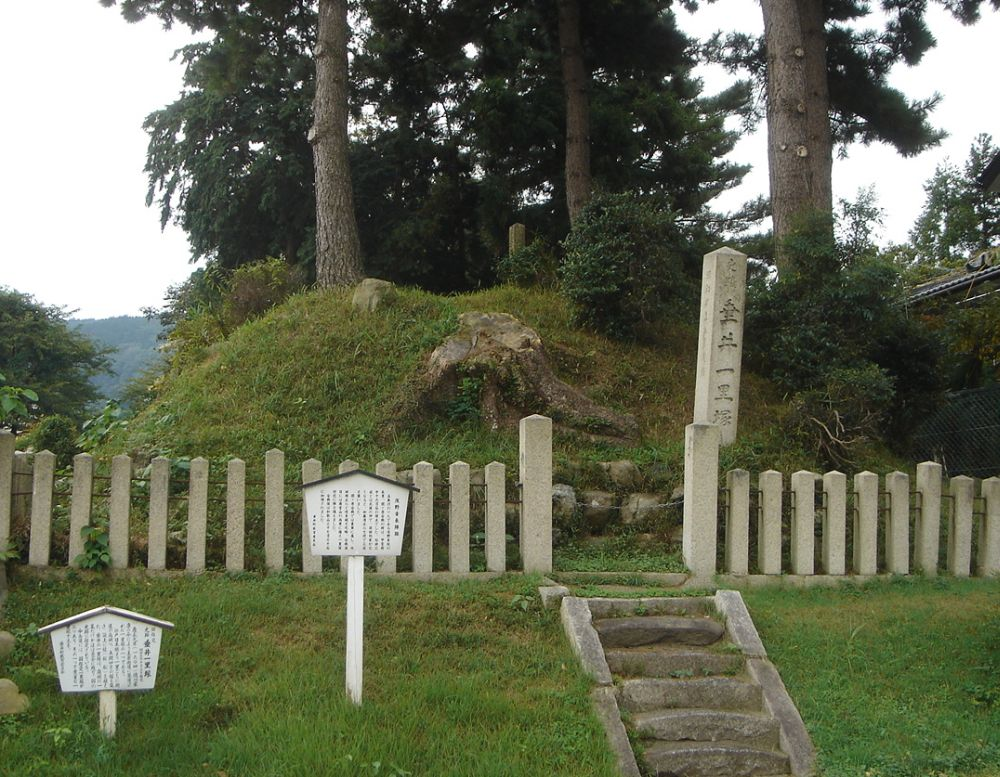
- Tarui Ichirizuka

- Tarui Ichirizuka Tarui Ichirizuka (Japan)
- 35°22′14″N 136°30′42″E
- Periods: Edo period
- Location: Tarui, Gifu, Japan
- Region: Chūbu region

Site notes
- Public access: Yes

Tarui Ichirizuka (垂井一里塚) is a historic Japanese distance marker akin to a milestone, consisting of an earthen mounds located in what is now part of the town of Tarui, Gifu Prefecture in the Chūbu region of Japan. It was designated a National Historic Site of Japan in 1930.

== Overview ==
During the Edo period Tokugawa shogunate established ichirizuka on major roads, enabling calculation both of distance travelled and of the charge for transportation by kago or palanquin. These markers were a pair earthen mounds and denoted the distance in ri (3.927 kilometres (2.440 mi)) to Nihonbashi, the "Bridge of Japan", erected in Edo in 1603. They were typically planted with an enoki or Japanese red pine to provide shelter for travelers. Since the Meiji period, most of the ichirizuka have disappeared, having been destroyed by the elements, modern highway construction and urban encroachment. In 1876, the "Ichirizuka Abolition decree" was issued by the Meiji government and many were demolished at that time. Currently, 17 surviving ichirizuka are designated as national historic sites.

In the case of the Tarui ichirizuka, there is only a single mound, which is located on the southern side of the Nakasendō, one of the major routes between Edo and Kyoto. This marker is 112 ri from Nihonbashi. The mound is also located near the site of the Battle of Sekigahara, and was erected on the location of the field headquarters of Asano Yoshinaga. The mound is in very good preservation, with a height of about 4.7 meters and a diameter of about 20 meters. There are only two ichirizuka classed as national historic site on the Nakasendō; the other is Shimura Ichirizuka in Itabashi, Tokyo. The Tarui Ichirizuka is about a 25-minute walk from Tarui Station on the JR East Tōkaidō Main Line.

== See also ==
- List of Historic Sites of Japan (Gifu)
