= Sekigahara =

Sekigahara 関ケ原町
- Town
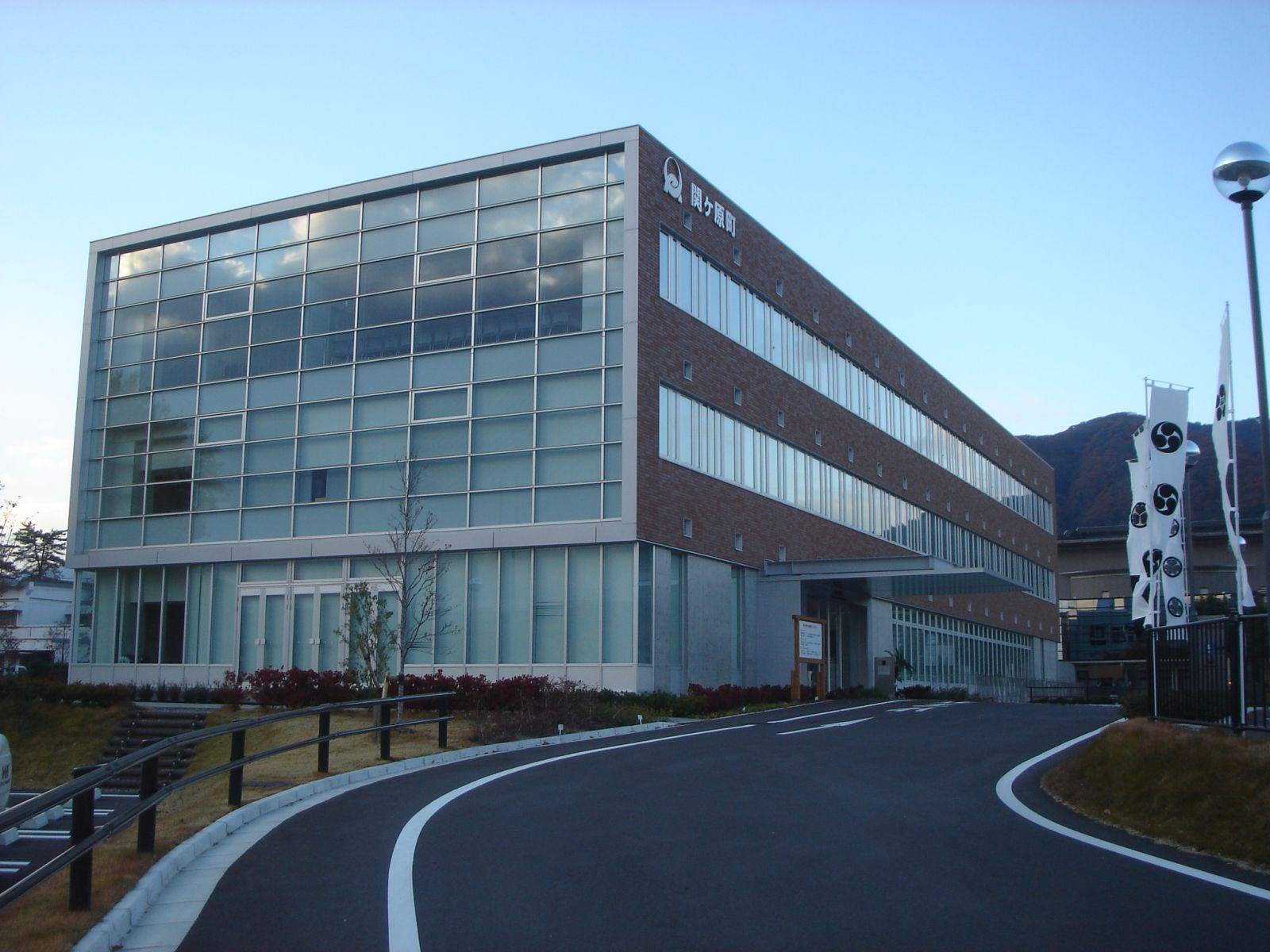
- Sekigahara Town Hall

- Flag Seal

- Location of Sekigahara in Gifu Prefecture

- Coordinates: 35°21′55.8″N 136°28′01″E
- Country: Japan
- Region: Chūbu
- Prefecture: Gifu
- District: Fuwa

Government
  - Mayor: Kentarō Azai

Area
  - Total: 49.28 km^{2} (19.03 sq mi)

Population (December 1, 2018)
  - Total: 7,109
  - Density: 144.3/km^{2} (373.6/sq mi)
- Time zone: UTC+9 (Japan Standard Time)
- City symbols
- Phone number: 0585-22-2111
- Address: Sekigahara 894-58, Sekigahara-chō, Fuwa-gun, Gifu-ken 503-1592
- Website: Official website
- Symbols
- Bird: Rock ptarmigan
- Flower: Ume
- Tree: Japanese Cedar

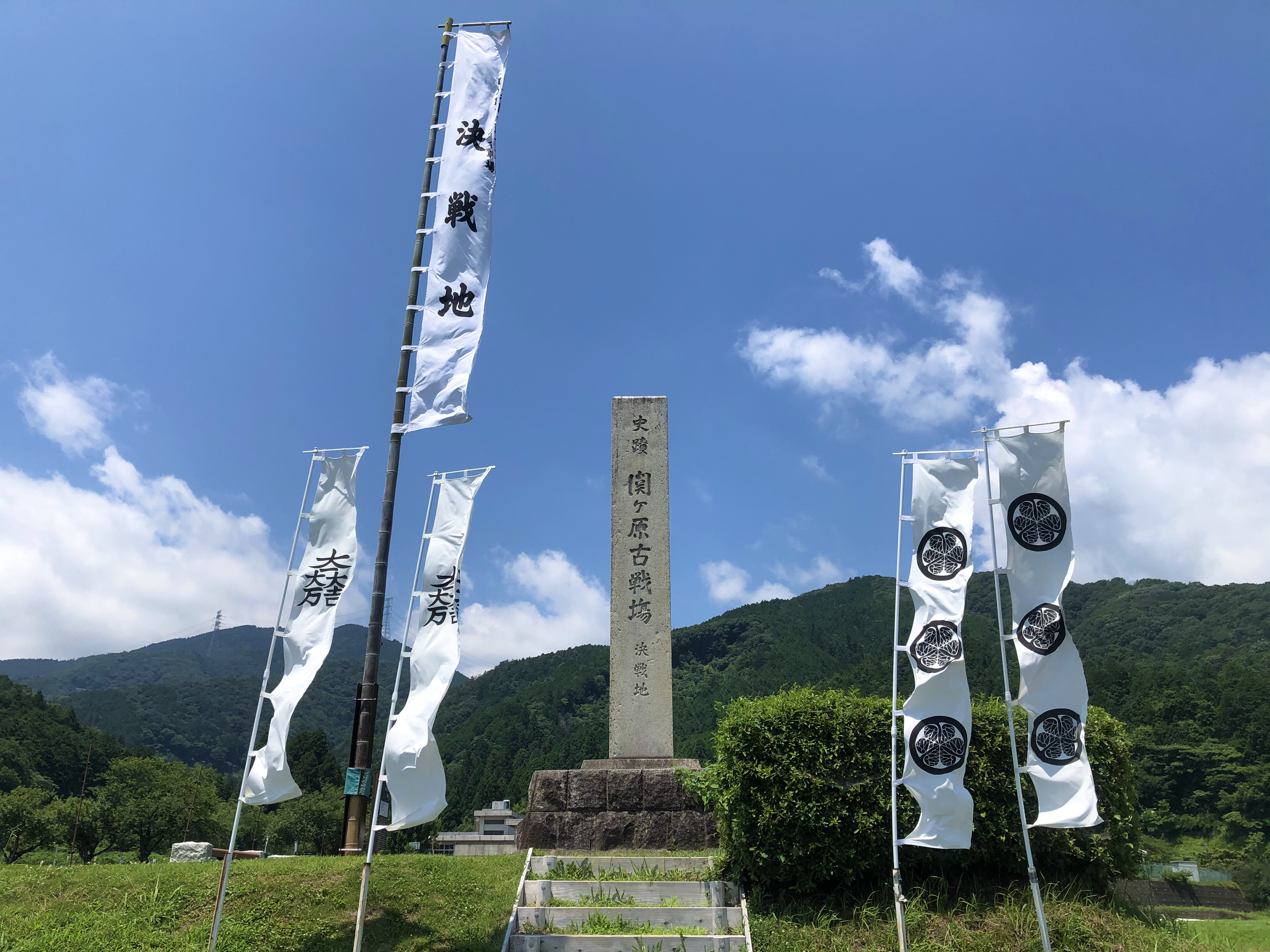
Site of the Battle of Sekigahara

Sekigahara (関ケ原町, Sekigahara-chō (Note: Japanese pronunciation: [se.kʲi.ɡaꜜ.ha.ɾa, -ŋaꜜ-, -ɡa.ha.ɾaꜜ.tɕoː, -ŋa-])) is a town located in Fuwa District, Gifu Prefecture, Japan. As of 1 December 2018, the town had an estimated population of 7,109 and a population density of 140 persons per km^{2}, in 2,725 households. The total area of the town was 49.28 square kilometres (19.03 sq mi).

The town is most famous for the Battle of Sekigahara which ended the Sengoku Period and created the Tokugawa Shogunate. Due to this, Sekigahara is also a sister city of Waterloo, Belgium and Gettysburg, Pennsylvania, sites of other famous and significant battles on their continents.

== Geography ==
Sekigahara is located in a mountainous valley in far southwestern Gifu Prefecture, which forms a natural bottleneck connecting the Kansai region with the Tōkai region of Japan. The routes of the ancient Nakasendō highway and the modern Meishin Expressway, as well as the Tōkaidō Shinkansen and Tōkaidō Main Line all pass through this area.

=== Climate ===
The town has a climate characterized by hot and humid summers, and mild winters (Köppen climate classification Cfa). The average annual temperature in Sekigahara is 14.5 °C (58.1 °F). The average annual rainfall is 2,181.9 mm (85.90 in) with July as the wettest month. The temperatures are highest on average in August, at around 26.7 °C (80.1 °F), and lowest in January, at around 3.1 °C (37.6 °F). The mountainous areas of the town are noted for heavy snow in winter.

Climate data for Sekigahara (1991−2020 normals, extremes 1978−present)
Month	Jan	Feb	Mar	Apr	May	Jun	Jul	Aug	Sep	Oct	Nov	Dec	Year
Record high °C (°F)	15.6 (60.1)	19.1 (66.4)	23.7 (74.7)	29.5 (85.1)	32.6 (90.7)	36.1 (97.0)	37.6 (99.7)	37.9 (100.2)	35.7 (96.3)	30.7 (87.3)	25.0 (77.0)	19.7 (67.5)	37.9 (100.2)
Mean daily maximum °C (°F)	6.9 (44.4)	8.0 (46.4)	12.1 (53.8)	18.0 (64.4)	23.0 (73.4)	26.2 (79.2)	30.0 (86.0)	31.8 (89.2)	27.6 (81.7)	21.9 (71.4)	15.8 (60.4)	9.7 (49.5)	19.3 (66.6)
Daily mean °C (°F)	3.1 (37.6)	3.6 (38.5)	7.1 (44.8)	12.6 (54.7)	17.6 (63.7)	21.5 (70.7)	25.4 (77.7)	26.7 (80.1)	22.8 (73.0)	17.0 (62.6)	11.0 (51.8)	5.6 (42.1)	14.5 (58.1)
Mean daily minimum °C (°F)	−0.1 (31.8)	0.0 (32.0)	2.6 (36.7)	7.6 (45.7)	12.9 (55.2)	17.7 (63.9)	22.1 (71.8)	23.1 (73.6)	19.2 (66.6)	13.0 (55.4)	6.8 (44.2)	2.1 (35.8)	10.6 (51.1)
Record low °C (°F)	−6.6 (20.1)	−8.7 (16.3)	−5.5 (22.1)	−1.2 (29.8)	4.3 (39.7)	10.6 (51.1)	15.2 (59.4)	14.6 (58.3)	9.7 (49.5)	3.8 (38.8)	−1.7 (28.9)	−5.8 (21.6)	−8.7 (16.3)
Average precipitation mm (inches)	140.8 (5.54)	111.9 (4.41)	143.0 (5.63)	160.7 (6.33)	204.0 (8.03)	242.4 (9.54)	297.5 (11.71)	194.9 (7.67)	283.1 (11.15)	169.2 (6.66)	95.9 (3.78)	138.5 (5.45)	2,181.9 (85.90)
Average snowfall cm (inches)	59 (23)	42 (17)	8 (3.1)	0 (0)	0 (0)	0 (0)	0 (0)	0 (0)	0 (0)	0 (0)	0 (0)	29 (11)	131 (52)
Average precipitation days (≥ 1.0 mm)	15.6	13.0	13.1	11.1	10.8	12.3	13.5	10.9	11.3	9.7	10.0	15.7	147
Average snowy days (≥ 3 cm)	5.0	3.8	0.9	0	0	0	0	0	0	0	0	2.1	11.8
Mean monthly sunshine hours	125.3	137.0	177.6	188.5	188.4	145.3	151.6	182.1	143.4	155.7	146.1	134.2	1,875.3
Source: Japan Meteorological Agency

=== Neighbouring municipalities ===
- Gifu Prefecture
  - Ibigawa
  - Ōgaki
  - Tarui
- Shiga Prefecture
  - Maibara

== Demographics ==
Per Japanese census data, the population of Sekigahara has declined over the past 50 years.

Historical population
Year	Pop.	±%
1970	10,788	—
1980	10,483	−2.8%
1990	9,544	−9.0%
2000	9,110	−4.5%
2010	8,096	−11.1%
2020	6,610	−18.4%

== History ==
The area around Sekigahara was part of traditional Mino Province. In 1600, the Battle of Sekigahara took place here. During the Edo period it was tenryō territory directly under the Tokugawa shogunate, administered by a hatamoto. During the post-Meiji restoration cadastral reforms, the area was organised into Fuwa District, Gifu Prefecture. The village of Sekigahara was formed on July 1, 1889, with the establishment of the modern municipalities system, and was raised to town status on April 1, 1928. In 1954, Sekigahara annexed the village of Imasu, as well as part of the neighboring town of Tarui. A proposed merger with the neighboring city of Ōgaki was rejected in 2004.

== Education ==
Sekigahara has one public elementary school and one public middle school operated by the town government, and one private combined elementary/middle school. The town does not have a high school.

== Transportation ==
=== Railway ===
- JR Central - Tōkaidō Main Line
  - Sekigahara

=== Highway ===
- Meishin Expressway
- National Route 21
- National Route 365

== Sister cities ==
- Gettysburg, Pennsylvania, United States, since 2016
- Waterloo, Belgium, since 2017

== Local attractions ==
- site of the Battle of Sekigahara
