= Mino Provincial Capital =

Mino Provincial Capital Site
- 美濃国府跡 (Japanese)
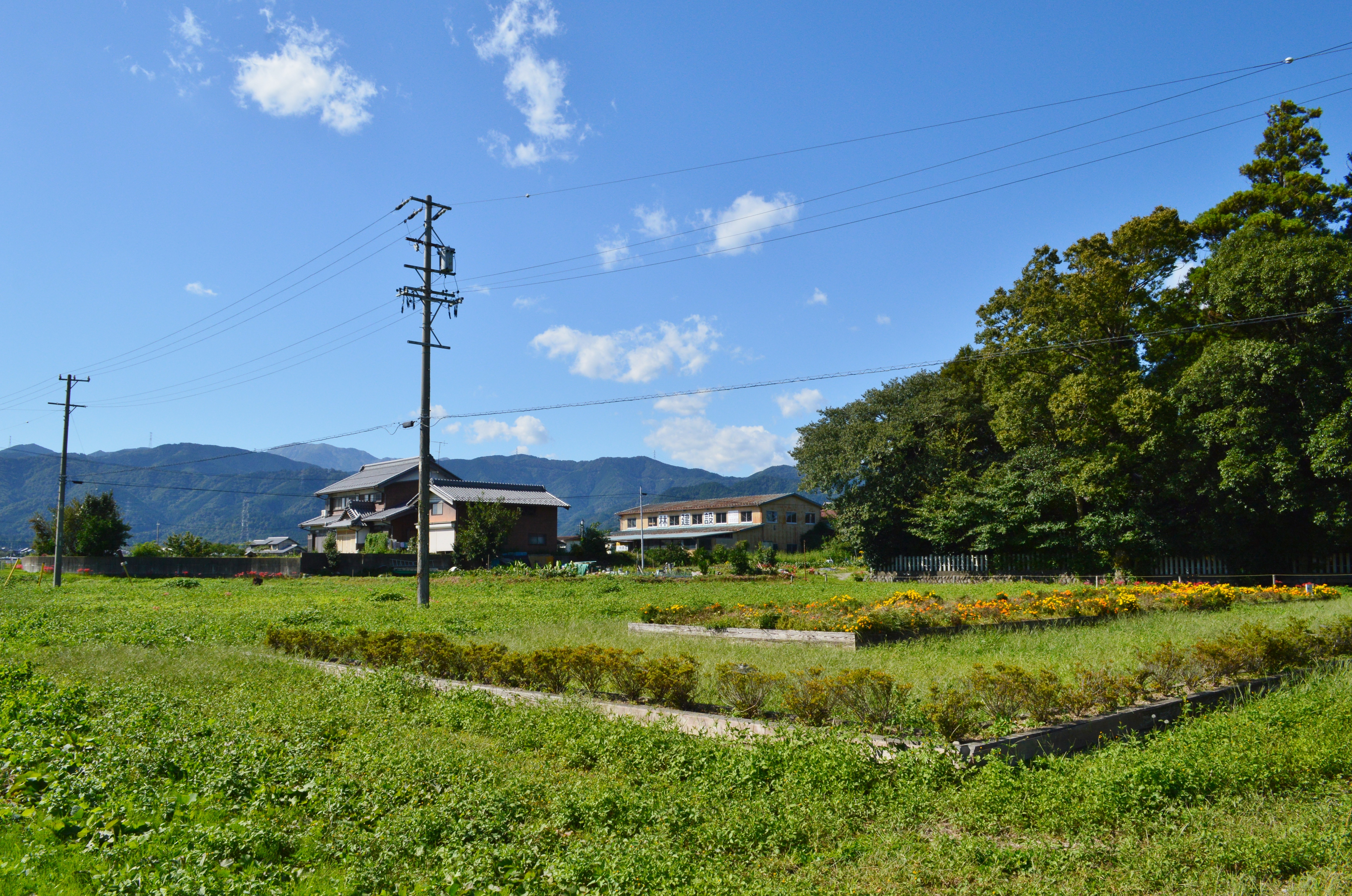
- Mino Provincial Capital Site

- Mino Provincial Capital Site Mino Provincial Capital (Japan)
- 35°22′39″N 136°31′26″E
- Type: Settlement
- Location: Tarui, Gifu, Japan
- Region: Chūbu region

History
- Built: Nara period

Site notes
- Condition: ruins
- Public access: Yes (no public facilities)

The Mino Provincial Capital Site (美濃国府跡, Mino Kokufu ato) is an archaeological site consisting of the ruins of the Nara period to early Heian period Provincial Capital of Mino Province, located in the Fuchū neighborhood of the town of Tarui, Gifu in the Chūbu region of Japan. The site was designated a National Historic Site of Japan in 2006.

== Overview ==
Following the Taika Reform (645 AD) which aimed at a centralization of the administration following the Chinese model (ritsuryō), provincial capitals were established in the various provinces, headed by an official titled kokushi, who replaced the older Kuni no miyatsuko. With a square layout, the provincial capitals were patterned after the Capital of Japan, first Fujiwara-kyō and then Heijō-kyō, which in turn were modelled on the Tang capital Chang'an, but on a much, much smaller scale. Each had office buildings for administration, finance, police and military and the official building of the governor, as well as granaries for tax rice and other taxable produce. In the periphery there was the provincial temple (kokubun-ji), and nunnery (kokubun-niji) and the garrison. This system collapsed with the growth of feudalism in the Late Heian period, and the location of many of the provincial capitals is now lost.

The Mino Provincial Capital was located at the western end of the Nōbi Plain. It had dimensions of approximately 400 meters east-to-west by 430 meters north-to-south. An archaeological excavation was conducted by the Tarui Town Board of Education from FY 1991 to FY 2003, which found the foundations of the main gate, the main government building (approximately 67 meters east–west and 73 meters north–south, flanked by building to the east and west, forming a U-shaped courtyard). Originally, all the buildings were raised pillar buildings, but were rebuilt with foundation stones in the late Nara period. The traces of a moat with a width of about 18 meters have been found on the southern end of the compound. Numerous artifacts, including many pottery and porcelain fragments, inkstones, and wooden tags with written inscriptions were found, as well as fragments of ornaments which were originally attached to official's belts. The site was abandoned sometime around the middle of the 10th century.

The site is about a 15-minute walk from Tarui Station on the JR East Tōkaidō Main Line.

== See also ==
- List of Historic Sites of Japan (Gifu)
