= Tarui =

Tarui 垂井町
- Town
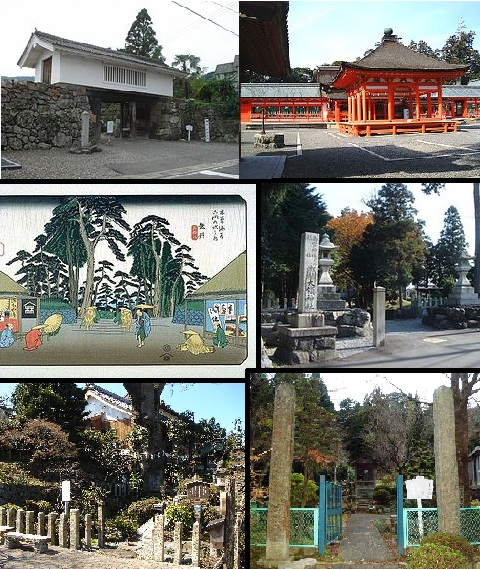
- Clockwise from top: Shigekado Takenaka's Jinya, Nangu Taisha, Tairyo Shrine, Site of Morichika Chosokabe's Jinya, Mineral Spring in Tarui, Picture of Tarui Traditional Inn in Edo Period

- Flag Seal

- Location of Tarui in Gifu Prefecture
- Coordinates
- Country: Japan
- Region: Chūbu
- Prefecture: Gifu
- District: Fuwa

Government
  - Mayor: Hirofumi Hayano

Area
  - Total: 57.09 km^{2} (22.04 sq mi)

Population (1 April 2025)
  - Total: 25,632
  - Density: 449.0/km^{2} (1,163/sq mi)
- Time zone: UTC+9 (Japan Standard Time)
- City symbols
- Tree: Japanese zelkova
- Flower: Camellia
- Phone number: 0584-22-1151
- Address: 1532-1 Tarui-chō, Fuwa-gun, Gifu-ken 503-2193
- Website: Official website

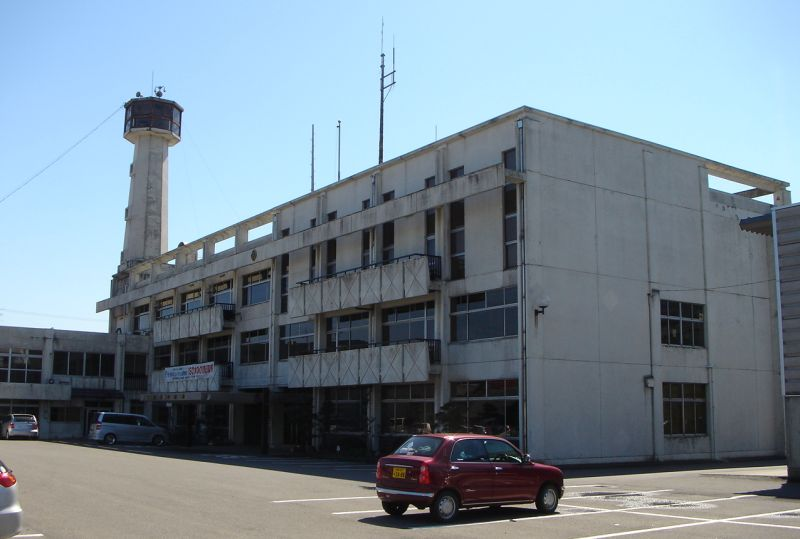
Tarui Town Hall

Tarui (垂井町, Tarui-chō) is a town located in Fuwa District, Gifu Prefecture, Japan. As of 1 December 2018, the town had an estimated population of 27,439 and a population density of 480 persons per km^{2}, in 10,525 households. The total area of the town was 57.09 square kilometres (22.04 sq mi).

== Geography ==
Tarui is located in far southwestern Gifu Prefecture, at the western end of the Nōbi Plain of Japan. The town has a climate characterized by hot and humid summers, and mild winters (Köppen climate classification Cfa). The average annual temperature in Tarui is 15.0 °C. The average annual rainfall is 1904 mm with September as the wettest month. The temperatures are highest on average in August, at around 27.5 °C, and lowest in January, at around 3.7 °C.

=== Neighbouring municipalities ===
- Gifu Prefecture
  - Ikeda
  - Ibigawa
  - Ōgaki
  - Sekigahara
  - Yōrō

== Demographics ==
Per Japanese census data, the population of Tarui peaked around the year 2000 and has declined slightly since.

Historical population
Year	Pop.	±%
1970	23,240	—
1980	26,404	+13.6%
1990	28,605	+8.3%
2000	28,935	+1.2%
2010	28,505	−1.5%
2020	26,402	−7.4%

== History ==
The area around Tarui was part of traditional Mino Province. Numerous Jōmon period and Kofun period remains have been found in the area, which was the site of the Nara period provincial capital and Provincial temple. During the Edo period, Tarui-juku prospered as a post station on the Nakasendō highway connecting Edo with Kyoto. The town of Tarui was formed on 1 July 1889 with the establishment of the modern municipalities system. The 1891 Mino–Owari earthquake caused considerable damage to the area. Tarui annexed the neighboring villages of Iwate, Fuchu, Miyashiro, Osa, and Aihara in 1954. The 1959 Isewan Typhoon caused severe damage to the town.

== Education ==
Tarui has seven public elementary schools and two public middle schools operated by the town government, and one public high school operated by the Gifu Prefectural Board of Education.

== Transportation ==
=== Railway ===
- JR Central - Tōkaidō Main Line
  - Tarui

=== Highway ===
- National Route 21

== Sister cities ==
- Calgary, Alberta, Canada, since July 1996

== Local attractions ==
- The Beauty of Tarui, a video portraying the major sites of Tarui
- Mino Provincial Capital Site, A National Historic Site
- Nangū Taisha, the ichinomiya of Mino Province
- Tarui Ichirizuka. a National Historic Site
