= Tarui Station (Gifu) =

Railway station in Tarui, Gifu Prefecture, Japan

CA78 Tarui Station 垂井駅
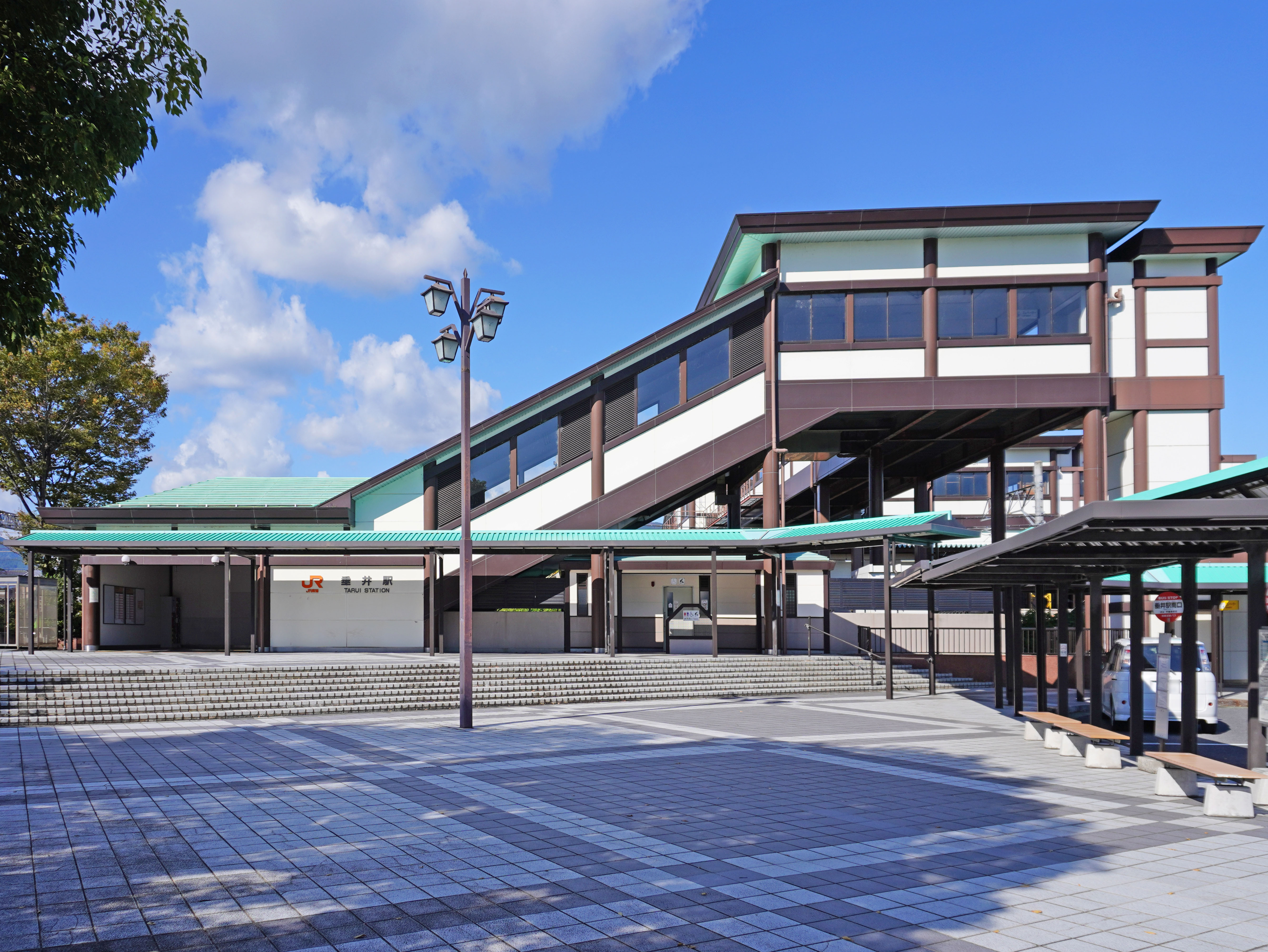
- Tarui Station in November 2022

General information
- Location: Tarui-cho, Fuwa-gun, Gifu-ken 503-2100; Japan
- Coordinates: 35°22′11″N 136°31′53″E
- Operator: JR Central
- Line: Tōkaidō Main Line
- Distance: 418.1 km from Tokyo
- Platforms: 1 side + 1 island platform
- Tracks: 3

Other information
- Status: Staffed (Midori no Madoguchi)
- Website: Official website

History
- Opened: May 25, 1884

Passengers
- 2023–2024: 4,767 daily
Location
- Location within Gifu Prefecture Location within Japan

Tarui Station (垂井駅, Tarui-eki) is a train station in the town of Tarui, Fuwa District, Gifu Prefecture, Japan, operated by Central Japan Railway Company (JR Central).

== Lines ==
Tarui Station is served by the JR Central Tōkaidō Main Line, and is located 418.1 kilometers from the official starting point of the line at Tokyo. The westbound main line track does not pass through Tarui station since opening of the bypass in 1944, express trains and freight trains use this track. The eastbound main line track passes through Tarui station and is used by all eastbound trains. Westbound local trains use the "Tarui branch line" (the old main westbound track) which parallels the eastbound main line.

== Layout ==
Tarui Station has one side platform and one island platform connected by a footbridge. The station has a Midori no Madoguchi staffed ticket office.

=== Platforms ===
- There is a side platform serving a track on the north side of the station and an island platform serving 2 tracks on the south side of the station.

1	■ Tōkaidō Main Line	for Ōgaki, and Nagoya
2	■ Tōkaidō Main Line	trains starting Sekigahara for Ōgaki and Nagoya
3	■ Tōkaidō Main Line	For Maibara and Kyōto trains starting Sekigahara for Ōgaki and Nagoya

== Adjacent stations ==
«	Service	»
Central Japan Railway Company
Tōkaidō Main Line
Limited Express "Hida": Does not stop at this station
Ōgaki	Local	Sekigahara
Ōgaki	Semi Rapid (westbound only)	Sekigahara
Ōgaki	Rapid	Sekigahara
Ōgaki	New Rapid	Sekigahara
Ōgaki	Special Rapid	Sekigahara

== History ==
1902 Tokaido Line around Tarui was duplicated.

1944 Downbound bypass line (westbound, hill climb) and Shin-Tarui Station were opened. Former down line was removed. Only up trains stopped at Tarui; down trains stopped at Shin-Tarui.

1946 Tarui Branch Line was opened where there had been former down line.

1986 Shin-Tarui Station was closed.

- 25 May 1884: Ogaki - Sekigahara and Tarui stations were opened.
- 23 August 1901: Ogaki - Tarui portion was double tracked.
- 10 February 1902: Tarui - Sekigahara portion was double tracked
- 11 October 1944: Bypass line and Shin-Tarui were opened. Only eastbound trains stopped at Tarui.
- 1 November 1946: Tarui branch opened. Every eastbound local train and some westbound local trains stopped at Tarui.
- 1 November 1986: Shin-Tarui Station was closed. Every local train in both directions stopped at Tarui.
- 1 April 1987: Railways were privatized and Tarui Station was inherited by JR Central.
- March 2018: Station numbering was introduced; Tarui Station was assigned station number CA78.

== Shin-Tarui Station ==
From 1944 to 1986 there was Shin-Tarui Station (新垂井駅, Shin-Tarui eki) on the westbound main line from Ogaki to Sekigahara. It was about 3 km far from Tarui Station and only westbound local trains stopped at the station. It had 1 through track and 1 siding track with a side platform. 35°23′30″N 136°30′47″E

The following photographs taken in December 2002 show the remains of Shin-Tarui Station:

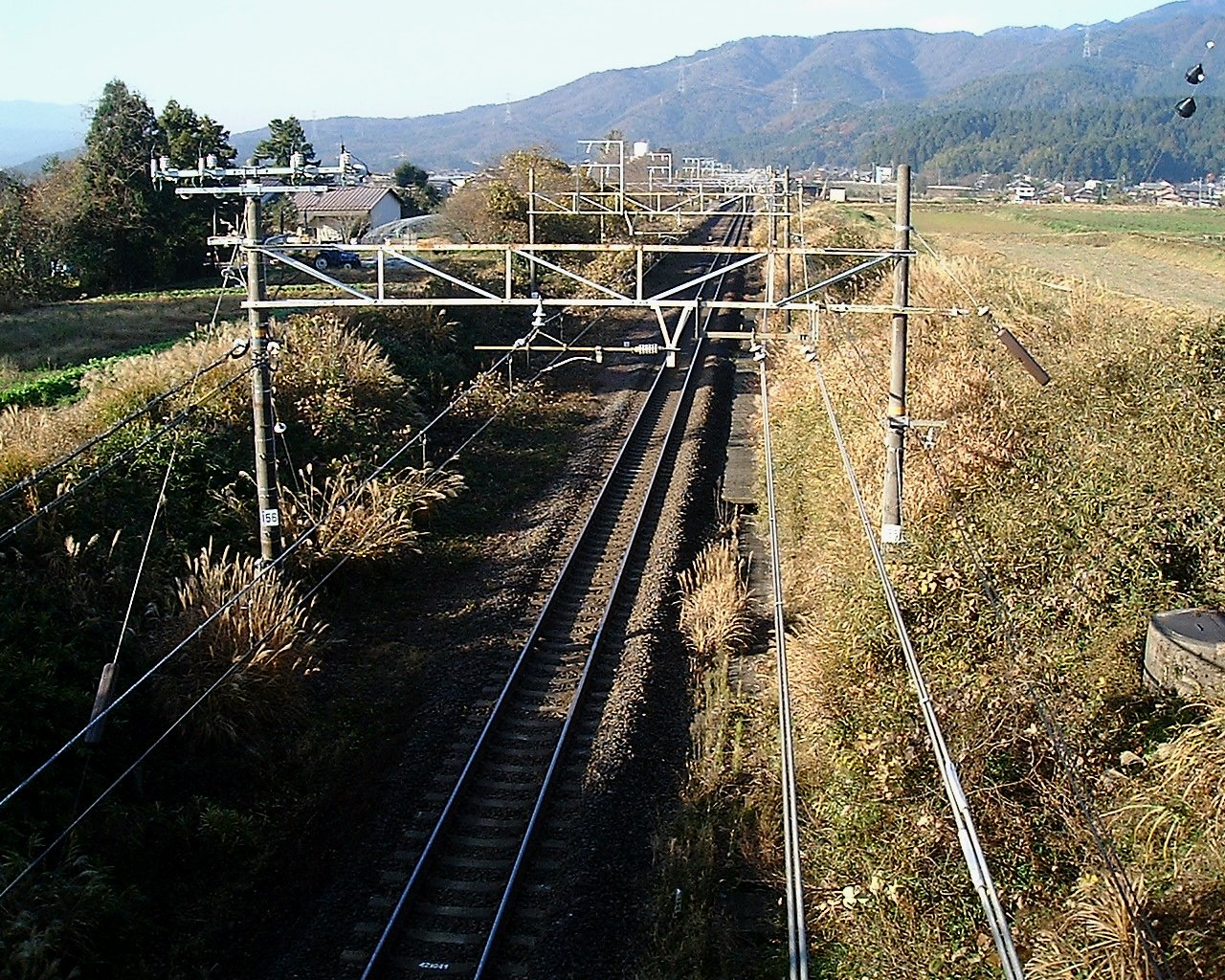

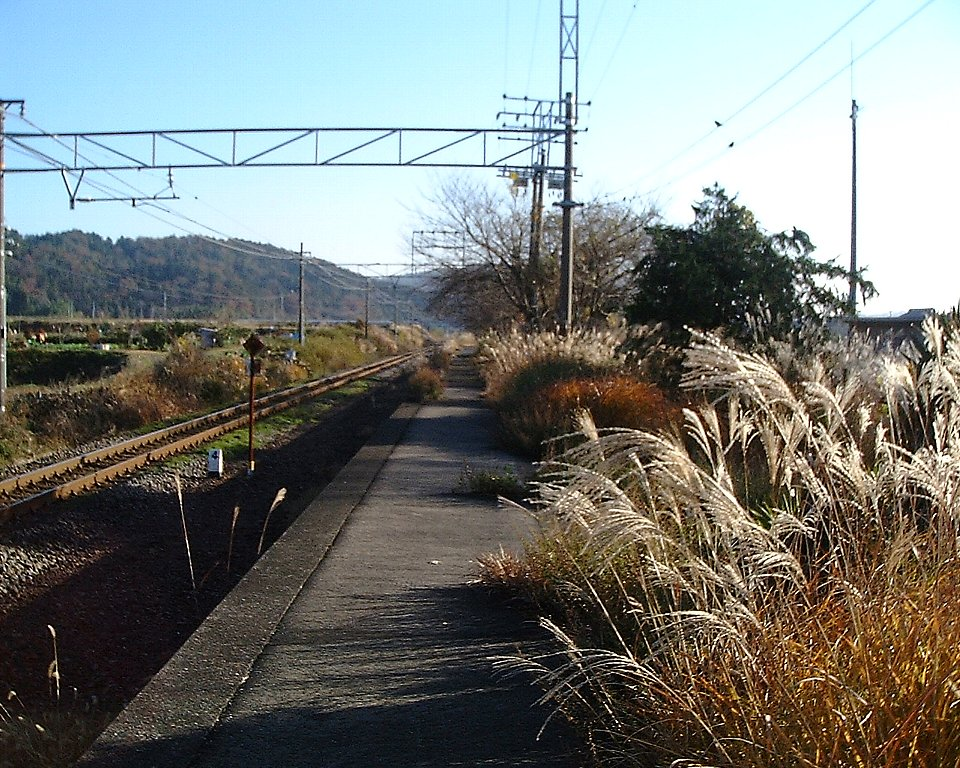

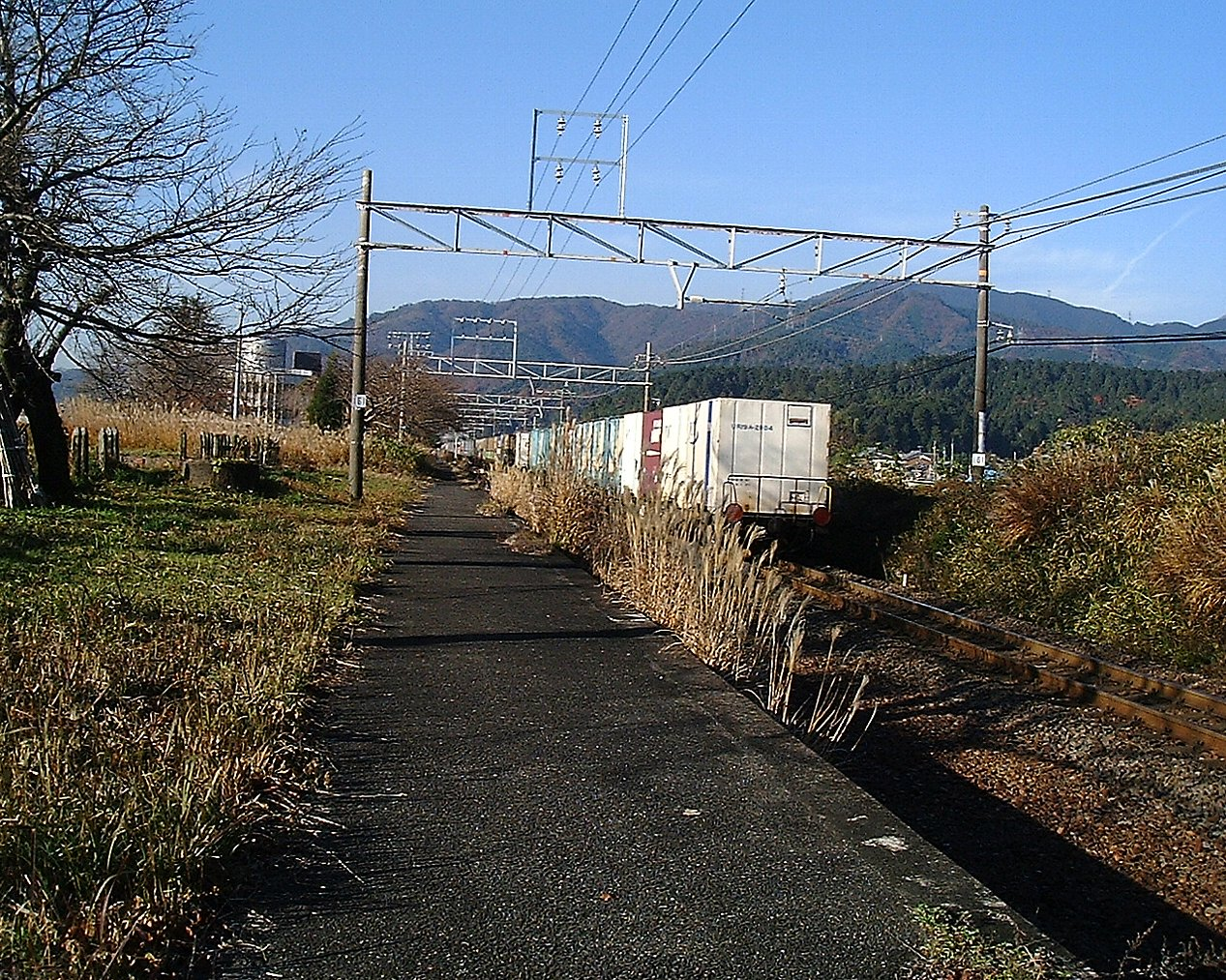

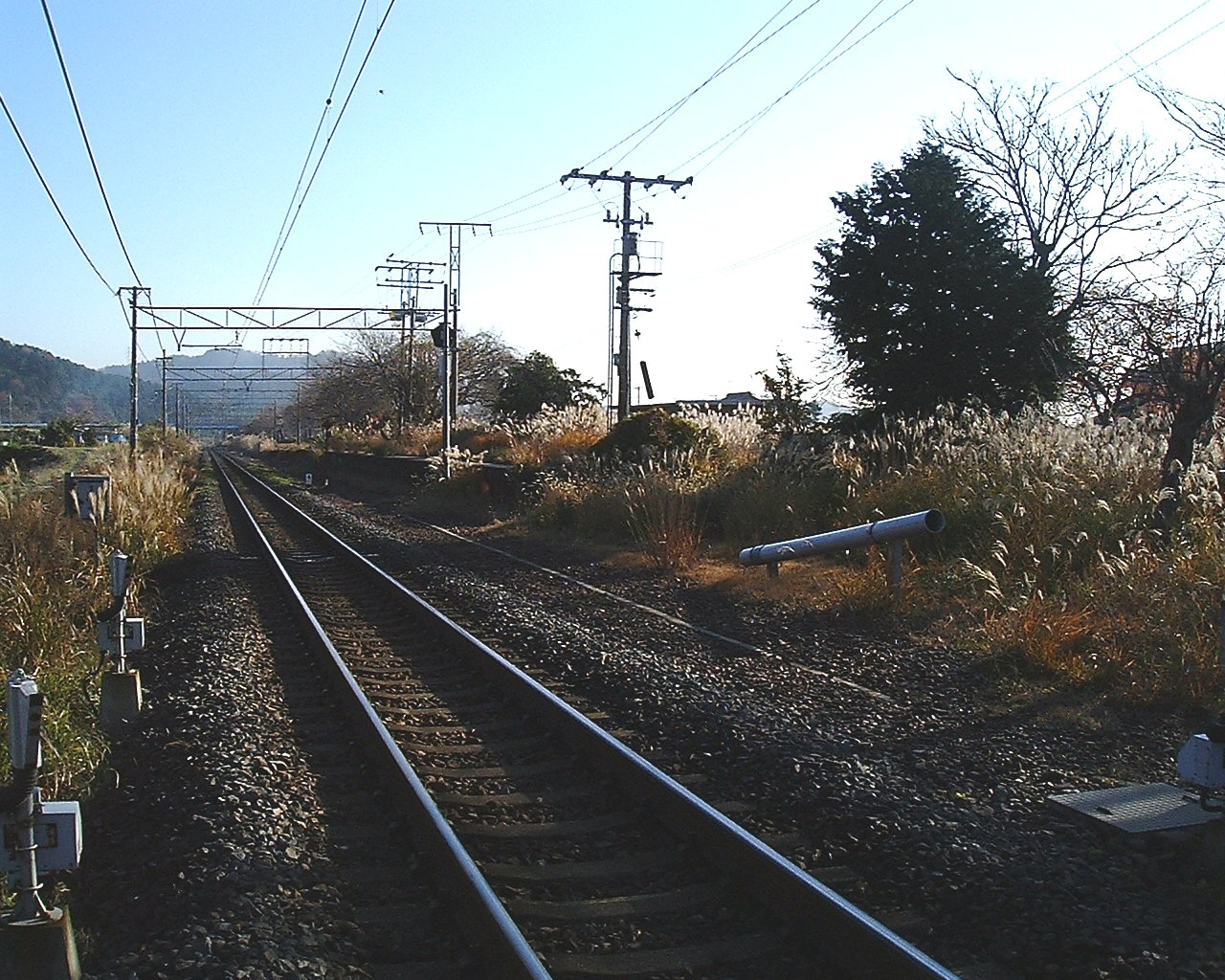

== Passenger statistics ==
In fiscal 2015, the station was used by an average of 2628 passengers daily (boarding passengers only).

== Surrounding area ==
- Tarui Town Hall
- site of Tarui Castle

== See also ==
- List of railway stations in Japan
