= Fuwa District =

District in Gifu prefecture, Japan

Coordinates: 35.370866°N 136.480118°E

The location of Fuwa District in Gifu.

Fuwa (不破郡, Fuwa-gun) is a district located in Gifu Prefecture, Japan.

As of July 2011, the district has an estimated population of 36,426. The total area is 106.43 km^{2}.

== Towns and villages ==
- Sekigahara
- Tarui
