= Takayama Jin'ya =

National Historic Site from the Edo period in Takayama Japan

Takayama Jin'ya 高山陣屋
- Takayama, Gifu Prefecture, Japan
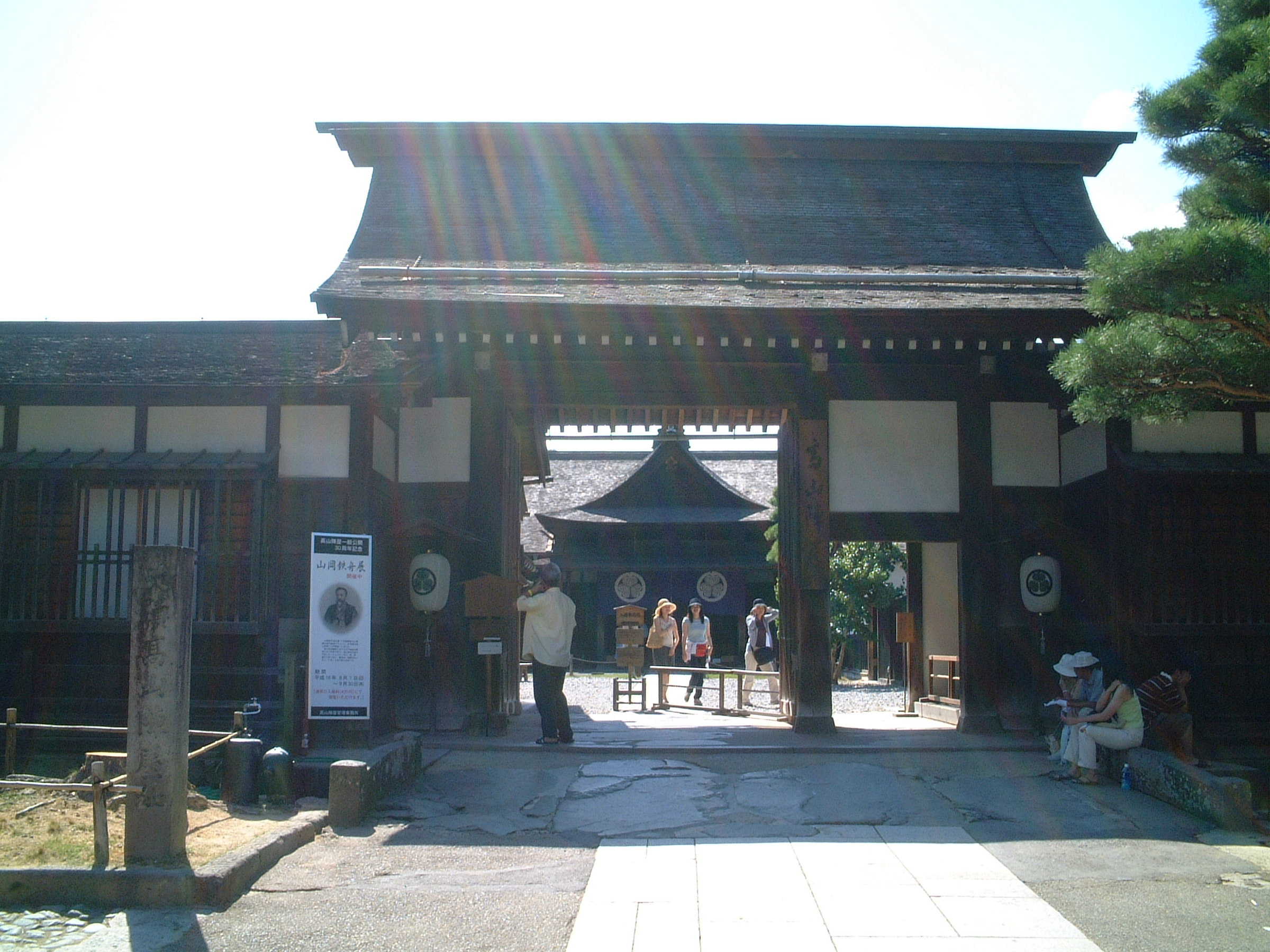
- Gate of Takayama Jin'ya

Site information
- Type: Jin'ya

Location
- Location within Gifu Prefecture Location within Japan
- Coordinates: 36°8′22.9″N 137°15′27.1″E

Site history
- Built: 1692
- Built by: Tokugawa shogunate
- In use: 1692–1871

Garrison information
- Occupants: Hida gundai

The Takayama Jin'ya (高山陣屋) is a surviving Edo period jin'ya which served as the Daikansho for Hida Province under the Tokugawa shogunate of Japan from 1692 to 1871. It is located in what is now Hachiken-machi of the city of Takayama in Gifu Prefecture. It has been protected as a National Historic Site since 1929.

== History ==
Following the Battle of Sekigahara and the establishment of the Tokugawa shogunate, Hida Province was awarded by Tokugawa Ieyasu to Kanamori Nagachika, who became daimyō of the 38,000 koku Hida-Takayama Domain, and who built Takayama Castle. The Kanamori clan was transferred to Kaminoyama Domain in Dewa Province in 1692. As Hida was rich in resources (gold, silver and copper, as well as its famed timber), the entire province was thereafter retained as tenryō territory directly under shogunal control. Takayama Castle was destroyed; however, the shimoyashiki at the base of the castle was modified to serve as the daikansho, or combined residence/office of the shōgun's appointed administrator for the province. In 1777, after the tenure of the 11th Hida daikan, the post was elevated to that of a gundai, and was made responsible for also managing the shogunate's direct territory in the provinces of Mino, Echizen and Etchū. A total of 25 men held this post over its 177-year period.

After the Meiji Reformation, the building was used as the Takayama branch office of "Chikuma Prefecture" (later Gifu Prefecture). In 1929, even after its designation as a historical landmark it continued being used as public or prefectural offices by a number of public entities until 1969.

== Architecture ==
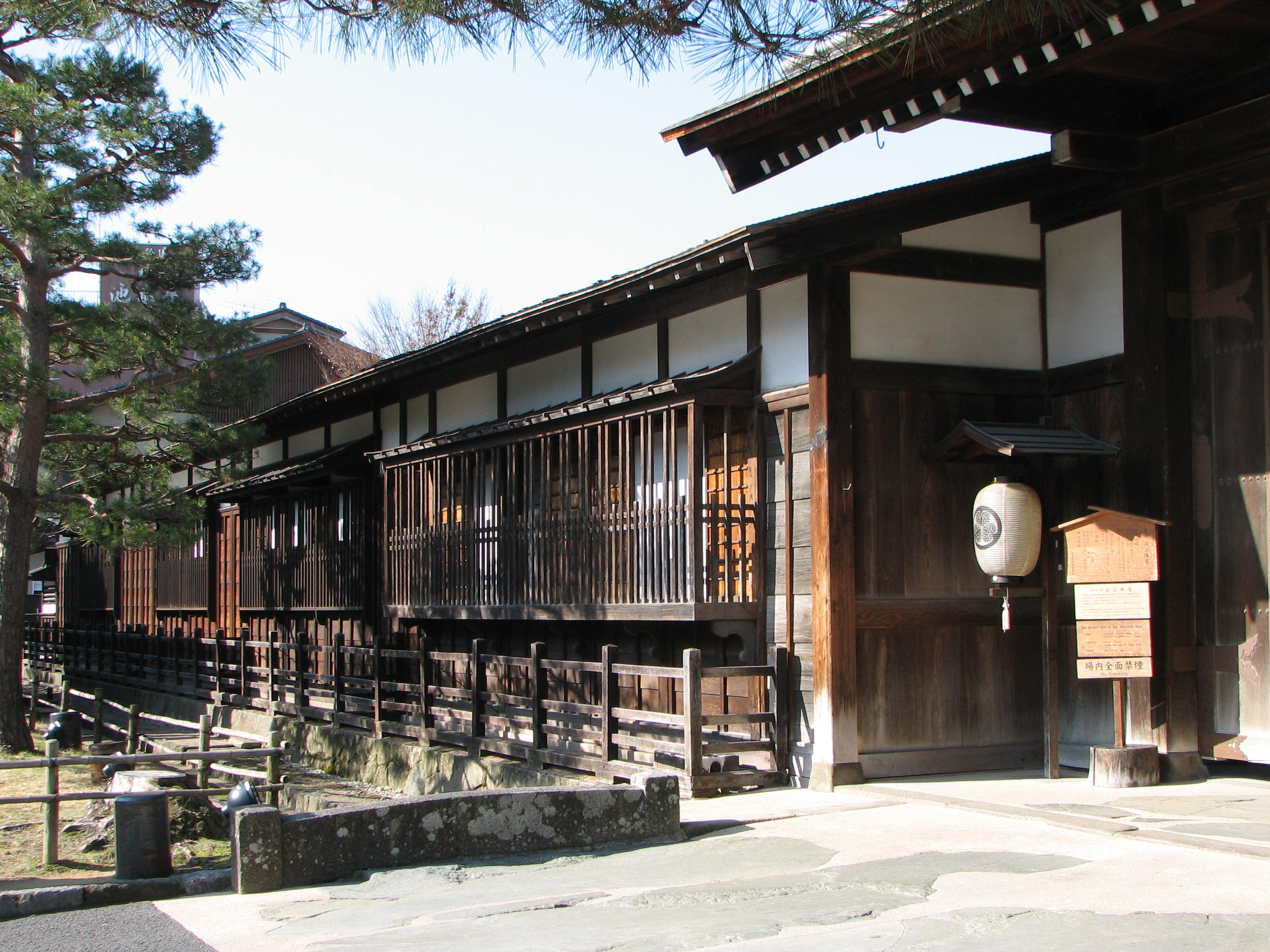
Gate of Takayama Jin'ya (left side)

The main building of the jin'ya was reconstructed in 1725 and 1816 and was renovated in 1871. The northern part of they building was relocated in 1876 to be used as the Hida-branch of the Gifu Prefectural office, but the remainder of the building remains essentially as per its 1816 reconstruction.

The earthen storehouses, which were originally constructed at Takayama Castle, were relocated to their present place in 1695. The roofs of the buildings are covered in several different styles (e.g. noshi-buki, kokera-buki, and ishiokinagakure-buki), but all of these methods utilize wooden shingles. It is thought that this is due to the fact that the Hida region receives a lot of snow and was a production center for timber, and compared to clay roof tiles, which were easily worn down by ice and snow, wooden materials were more readily available. In 1883, one of these warehouses was destroyed to make room for the Takayama City Prosecutor's office.

The Takayama branch of the Gifu District Court continued to use the jin'ya until 1969. In 1996, the building was completely restored based on a drawing from 1830 at a cost of two billion Yen. As the only remaining building of its kind, Takayama Jin'ya is a tourist attraction and contains a museum with information about the history of the building inside. A farmer's market held every morning in front of Takayama Jin'ya.

The jin'ya is about a 10-minute walk from Takayama Station on the JR East Takayama Main Line.

== Gallery ==
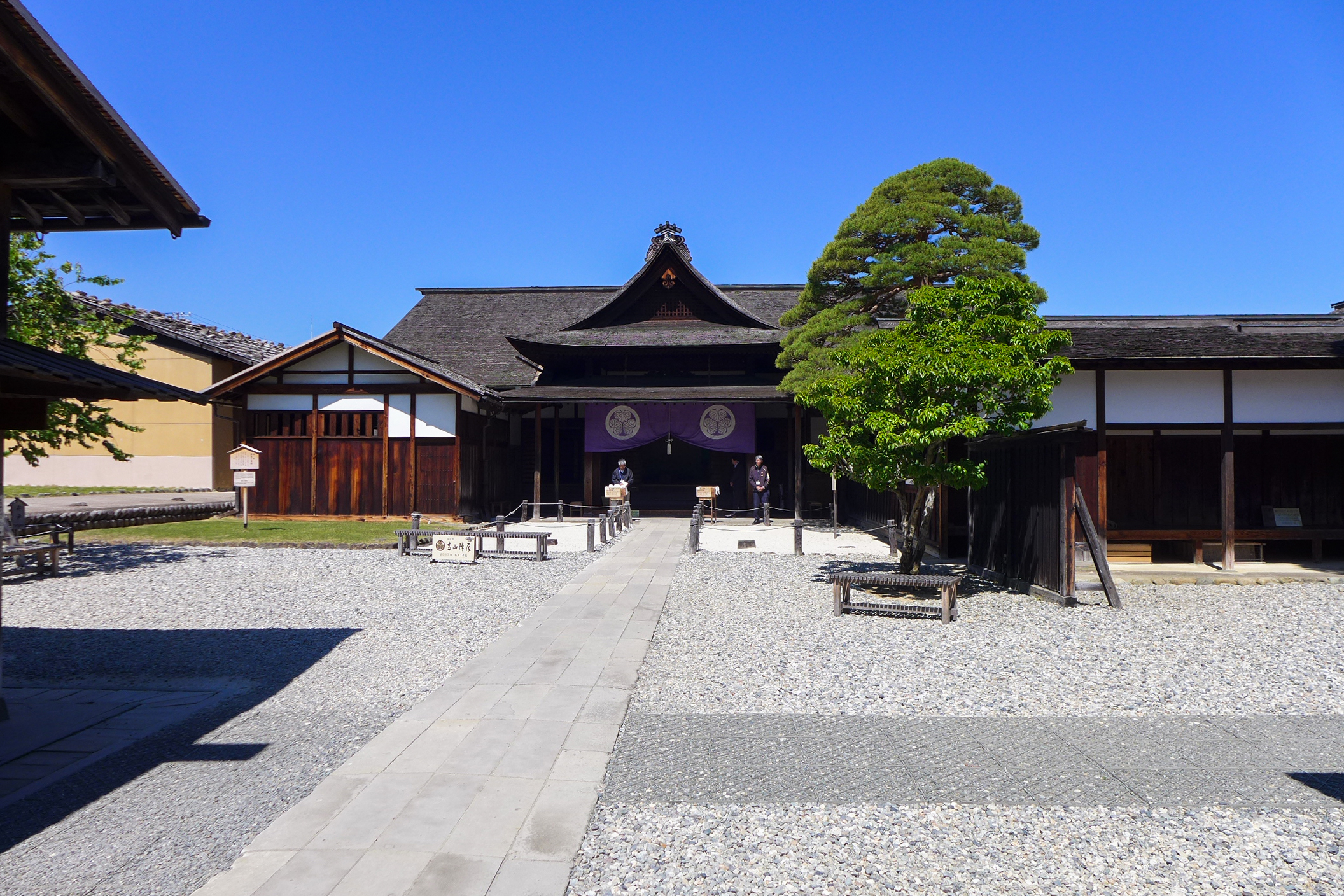
Overview

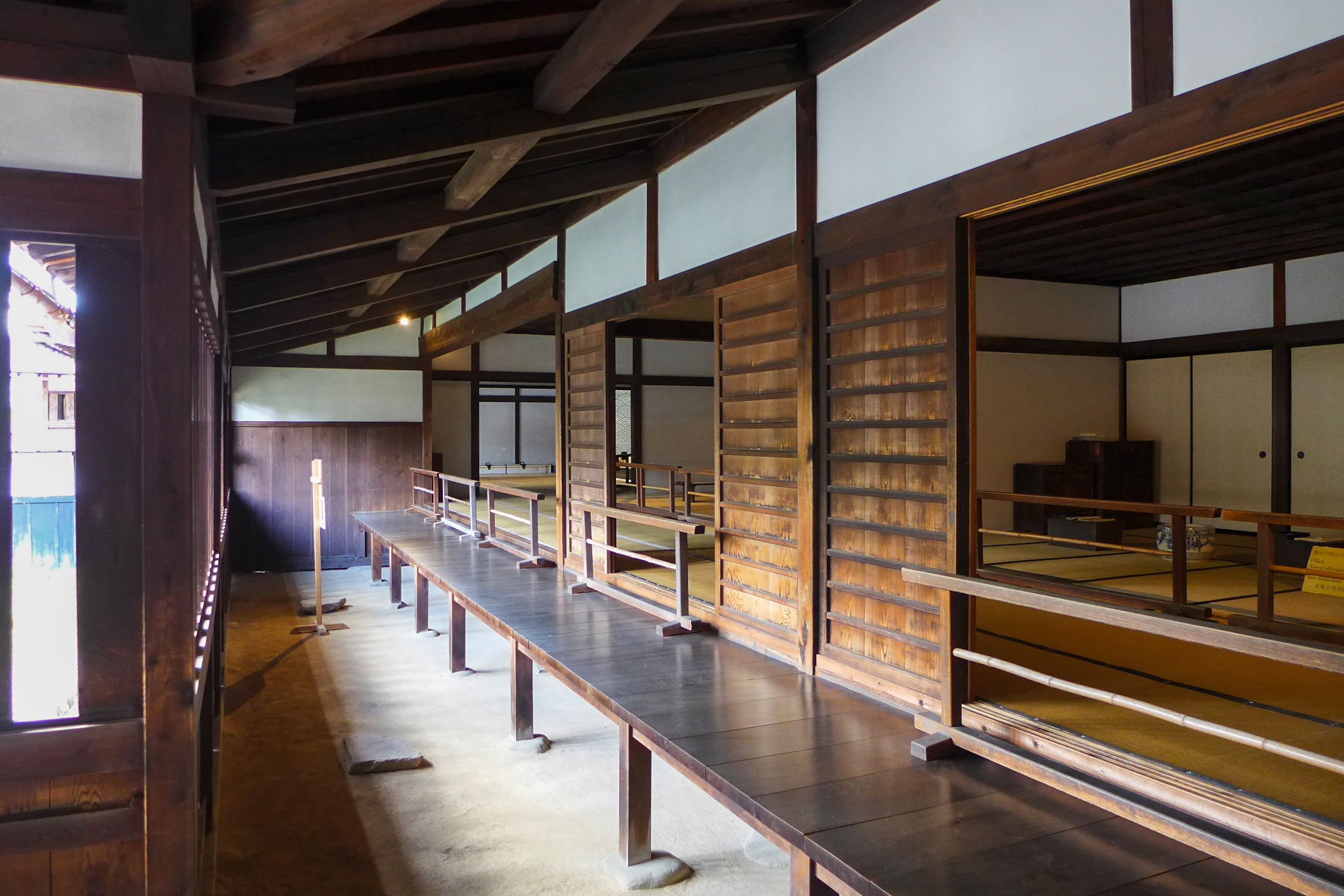
Inside view

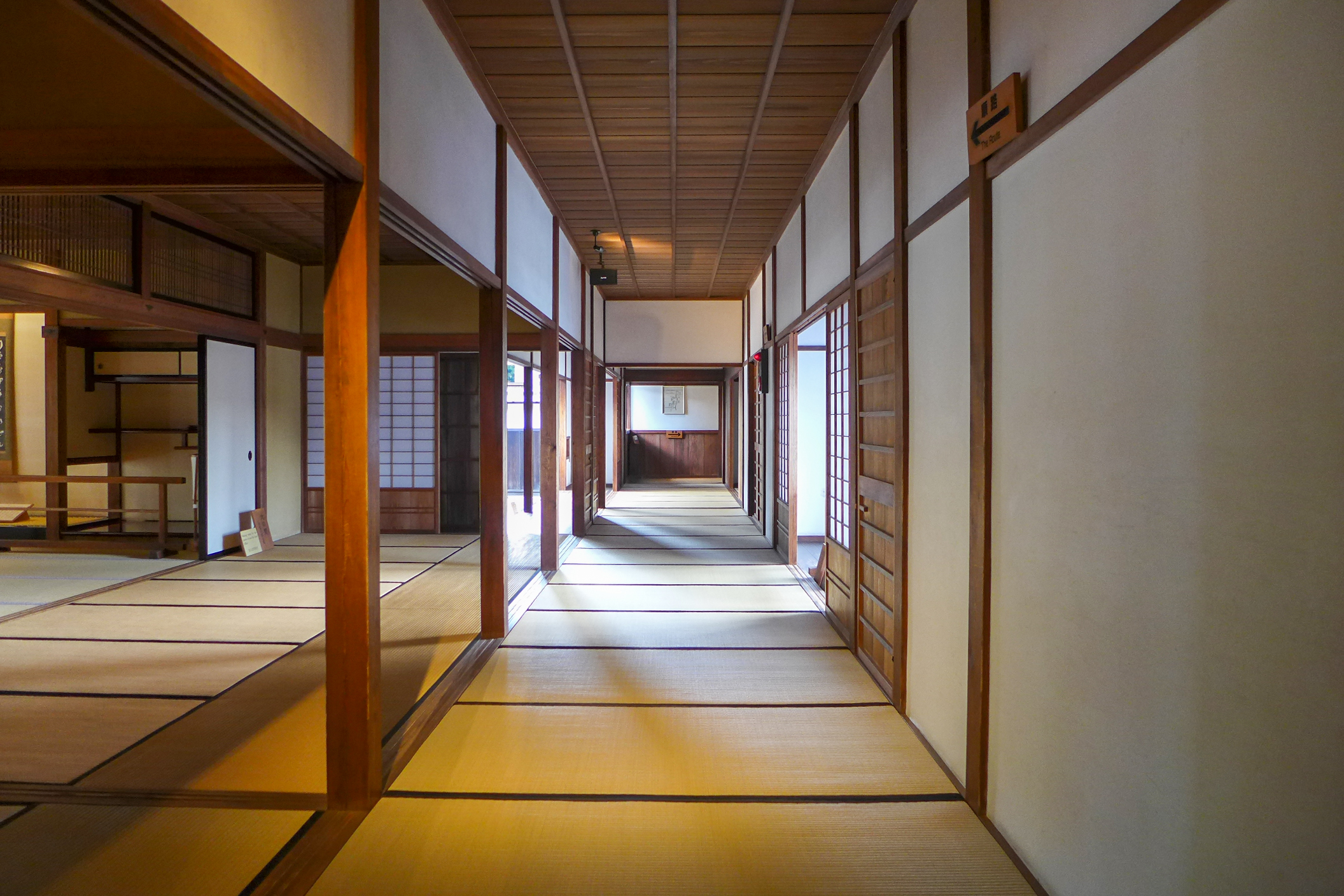
Inside view

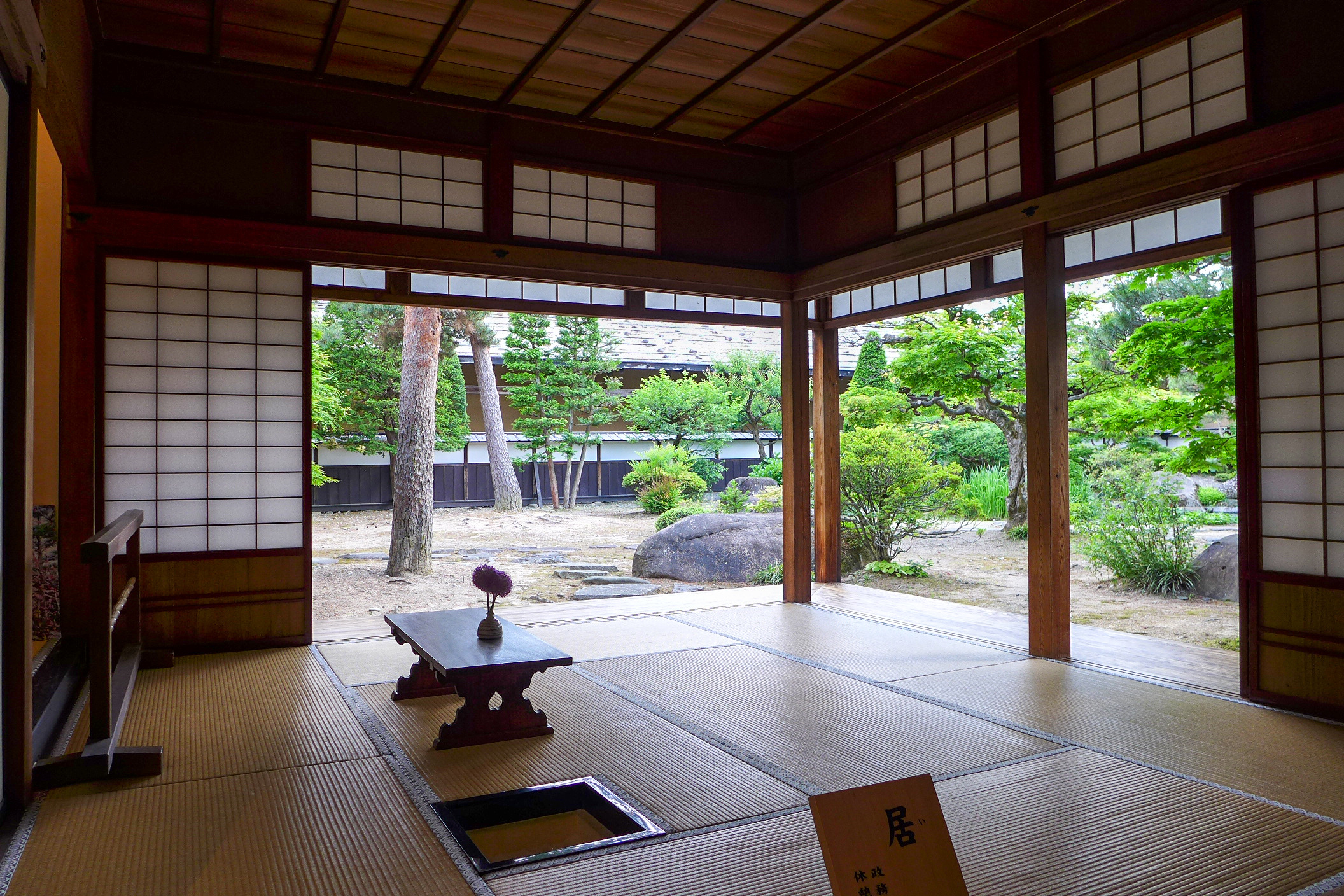
Inside view

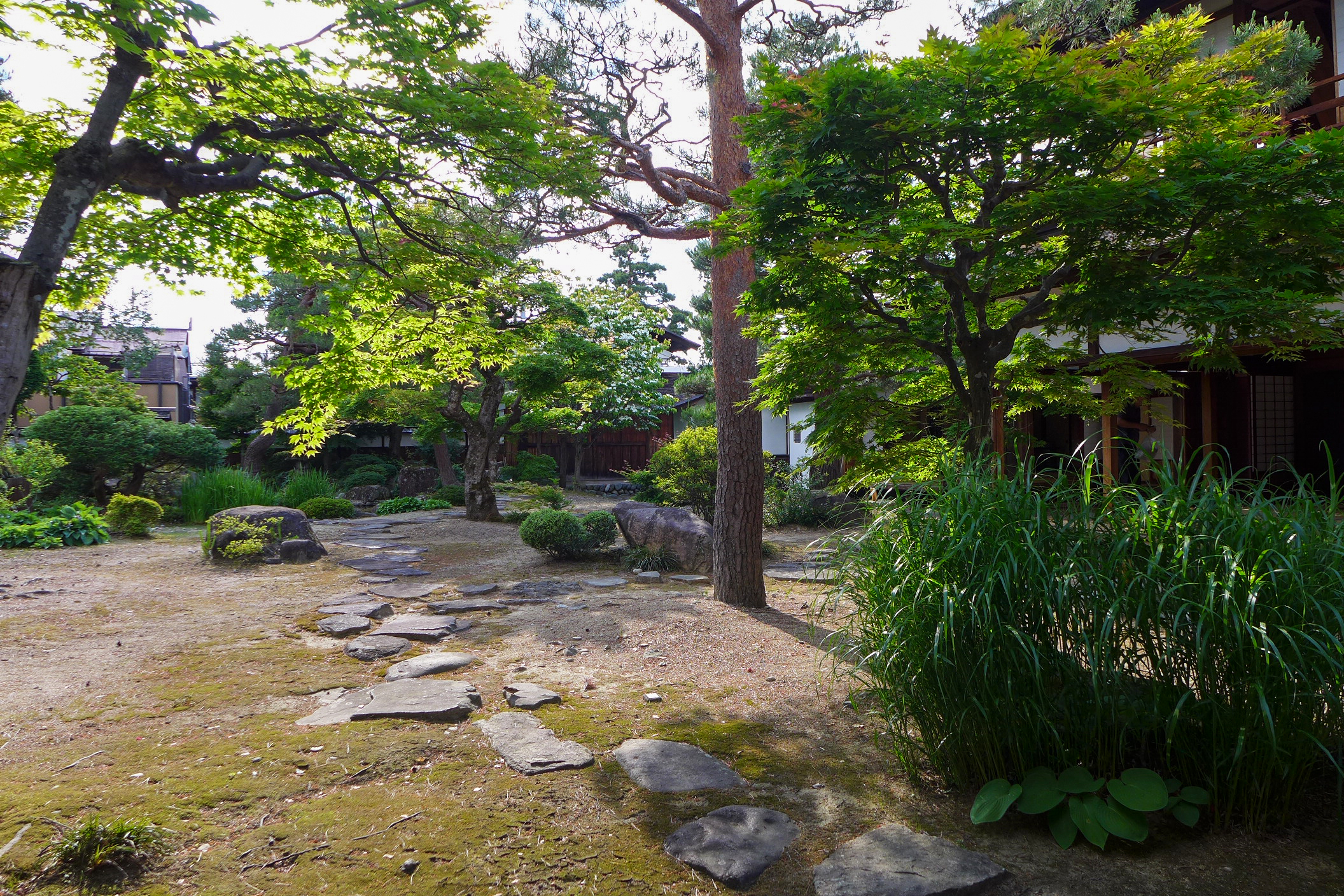
Garden

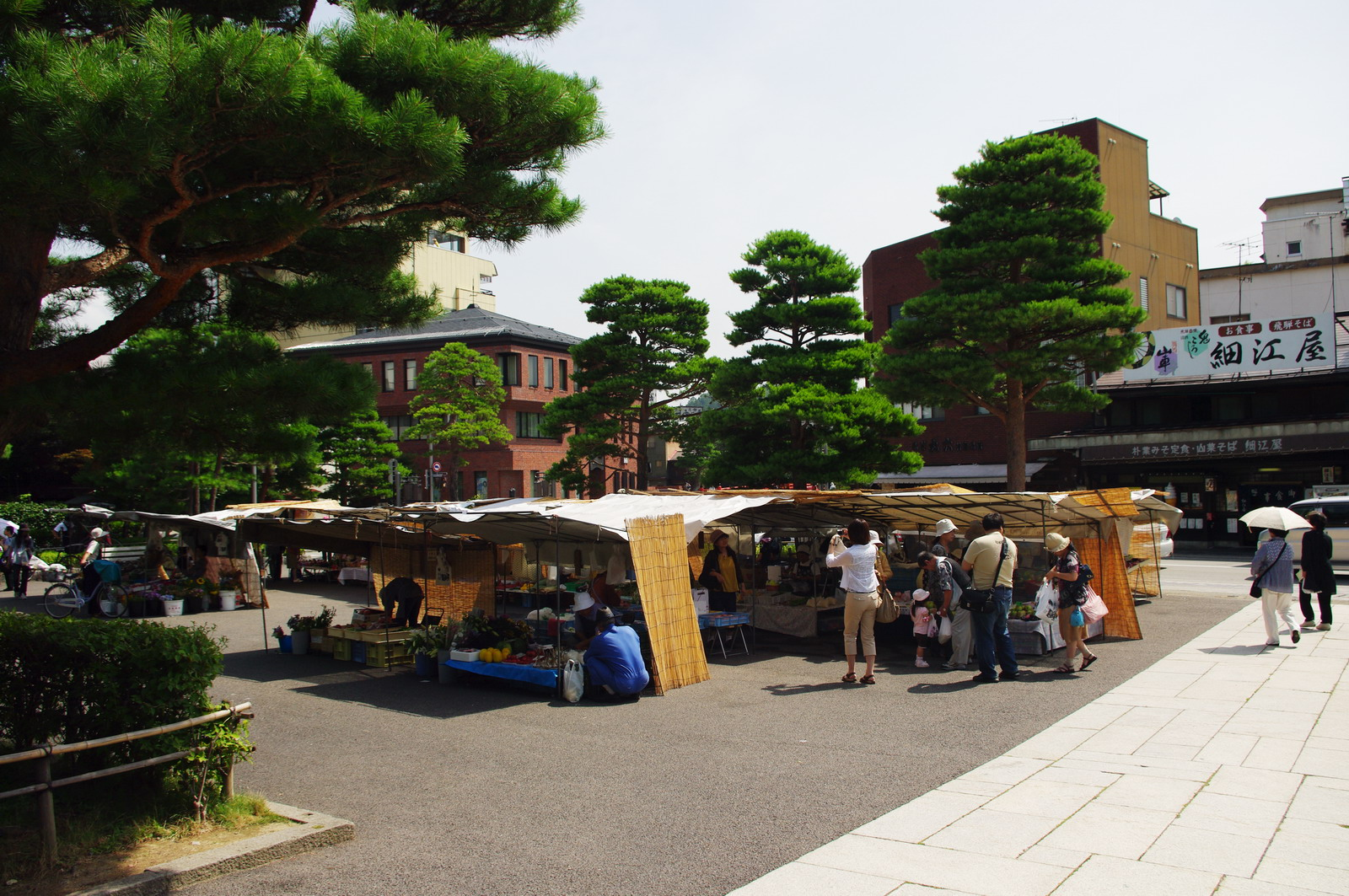
Morning market

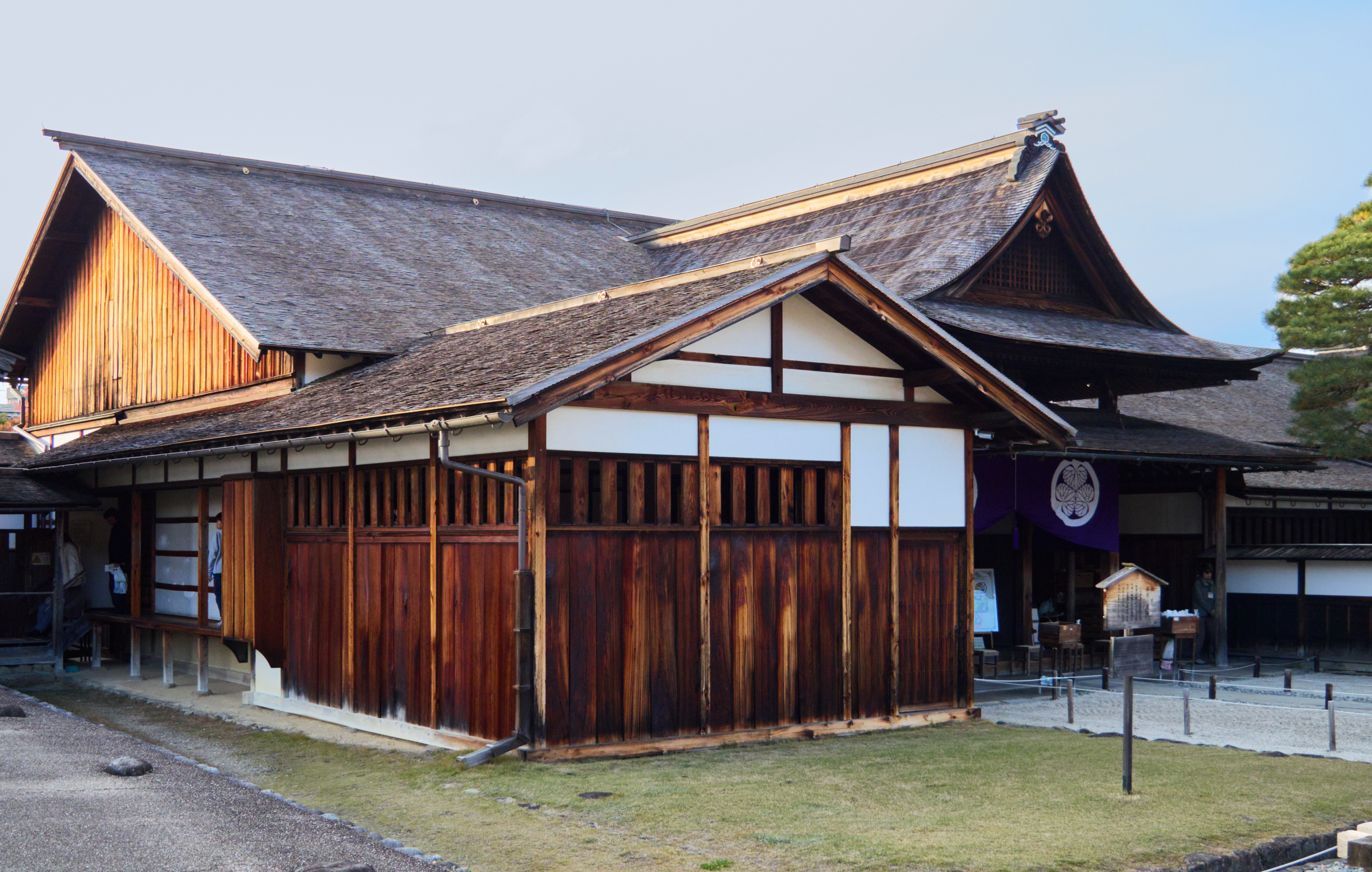

== See also ==
- List of Historic Sites of Japan (Gifu)
