= Imanishi =

Imanishi (written: 今西) is a Japanese surname. Notable people with the surname include:

- Kazuo Imanishi (今西 和男; 1941–2026), Japanese football player and manager
- Kinji Imanishi (今西 錦司; 1902–1992), Japanese ecologist and anthropologist
- Masaya Imanishi (今西 方哉; born 1947), Japanese ceramic artist
- Miharu Imanishi (今西 美晴; born 1992), Japanese tennis player

== See also ==
- Thereza Imanishi-Kari, Brazilian associate professor of pathology of Japanese descent
- Imanishi Family Residence, one of a Group of Traditional Buildings in Imai-cho, Kashihara, Nara Prefecture, Japan
