= Hishū =

Hishū or Hishu may refer to:

- Hishū (飛州)
  - Hishū, another name for Hida Province.
- Hishū (肥州)
  - Hishū, another name for Hi Province.
  - Hishū, another name for Hizen Province.
  - Hishū, another name for Higo Province.
    - Hizen and Higo are also called Ryōhi (両肥) or Nihi (二肥).
