= Takayama Castle =

Castle in Takayama, Gifu, Japan

Takayama Castle 高山城
- Takayama, Gifu Prefecture, Japan
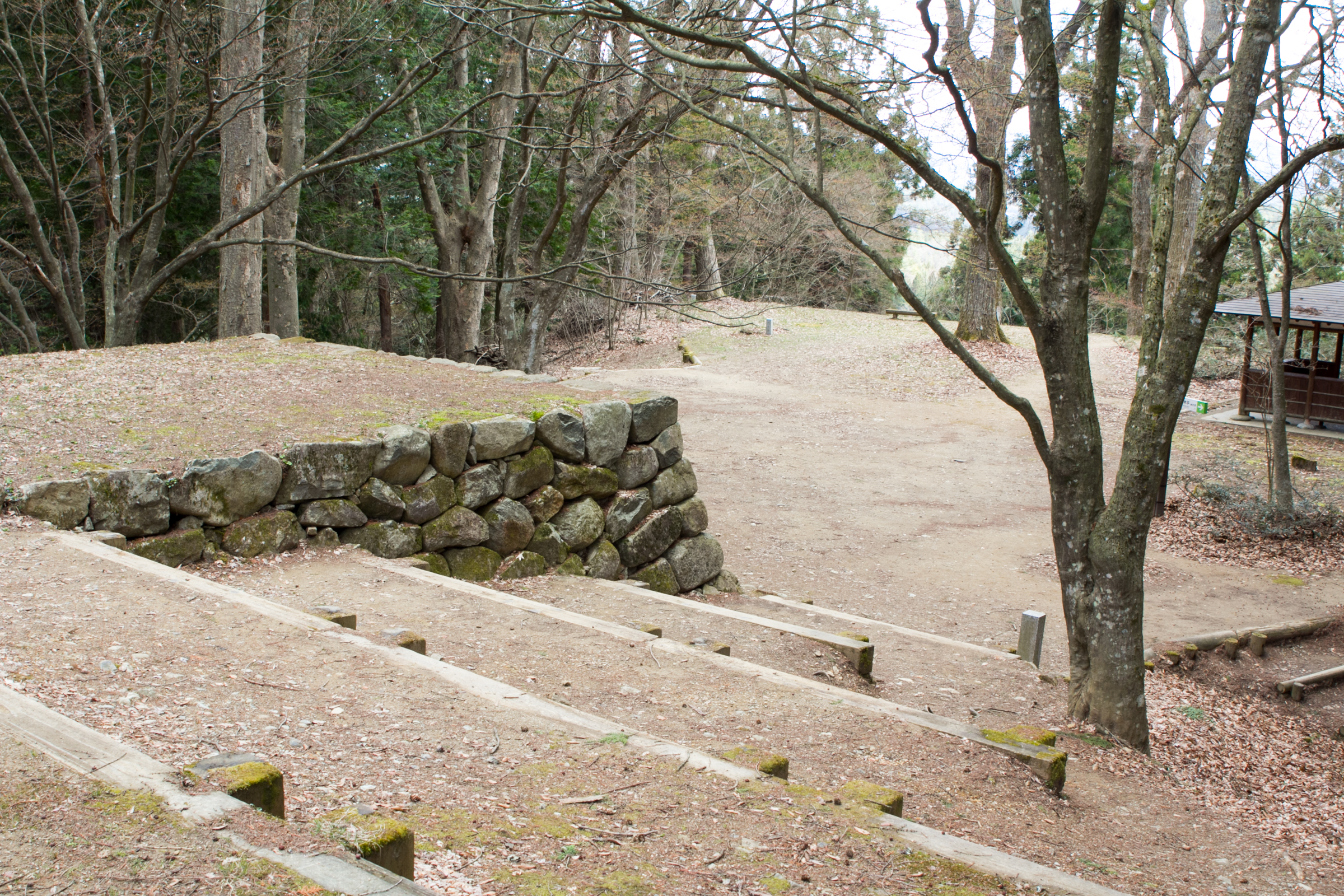
- Remnants of Takayama Castle at Shiroyama Park

Site information
- Type: Mountaintop castle
- Condition: ruins

Location
- Location within Japan
- Coordinates: 36°08′17″N 137°15′49″E

Site history
- Built: 1588-1600
- Built by: Kanamori Nagachika
- In use: 1588–1695
- Demolished: 1695

Garrison information
- Occupants: Kanamori clan

Takayama Castle (高山城, Takayama-jō) was a Japanese castle located in the city of Takayama, Gifu Prefecture, Japan. The castle was built on a mountain nearly 687 m (2,254 ft) in height and had many typical castle features, including a stone base, earthen walls and a surrounding moat.

== History ==
During the Sengoku period, Hida Province was nominally under the control of the Kyōgoku clan, but in reality was divided between several small local warlords such as Anegakōji clan or Ema clan. Being surrounded by the powerful Takeda clan, Uesugi clan or Oda clans, these local lords frequently changed allegiance based on circumstance. Miki Yoritsuna (1540-1587) who ruled the southern half of Hida gradually expanded his domains with the support of Oda Nobunaga. After Nobunaga's assassination in 1582, he decisively defeated an alliance of the remaining local lords united Hida province, with his base at Matsukura Castle. However, Yoritsuna supported Sassa Narimasa in neighboring Etchū Province against Toyotomi Hideyoshi and was destroyed by the forces of Kanamori Nagachika (who was then the ruler of Echizen Ōno Castle). Hideyoshi awarded Hida Province to Kanamori, who started to build a new castle on Shiroyama mountain in Takayama in 1588. By 1600, the main and secondary castle keeps were completed, but it would be another three years before the third keep was completed. In addition to the construction of the castle, Nagachika also developed a castle town at the same time. The Kanamori clan ruled as daimyō of Takayama Domain for about 100 years.

When the Kanamori clan was transferred to Dewa Province in 1692, the castle came under the control of the Maeda clan. Three years later Hida Province became tenryō territory, under the direct control of the Tokugawa shogunate, and the buildings of the castle were pulled down, with a jin'ya built at the foot of Shiroyama.

Currently the shape of areas remain with only a little part of stone walls, but several buildings were transferred to neighbor temples at the time of abolition and still remain. The local magistrate's office is preserved in almost the original style, called the Takayama Jin'ya.

The remains of the castle are in the present-day Shiroyama Park.

== Castle rulers ==
Kanamori clan

1. Kanamori Nagachika
2. Kanamori Arishige (金森可重)
3. Kanamori Shigeyori (金森重頼)
4. Kanamori Yorinao (金森頼直)
5. Kanamori Yorinari (金森頼業)
6. Kanamori Yoritoki (金森頼時)
