= Hida Kokubun-ji =

Buddhist temple in Takayama, Gifu, Japan

Coordinates: 36°08′36″N 137°15′13.3″E

Hida Kokubun-ji 飛騨国分寺
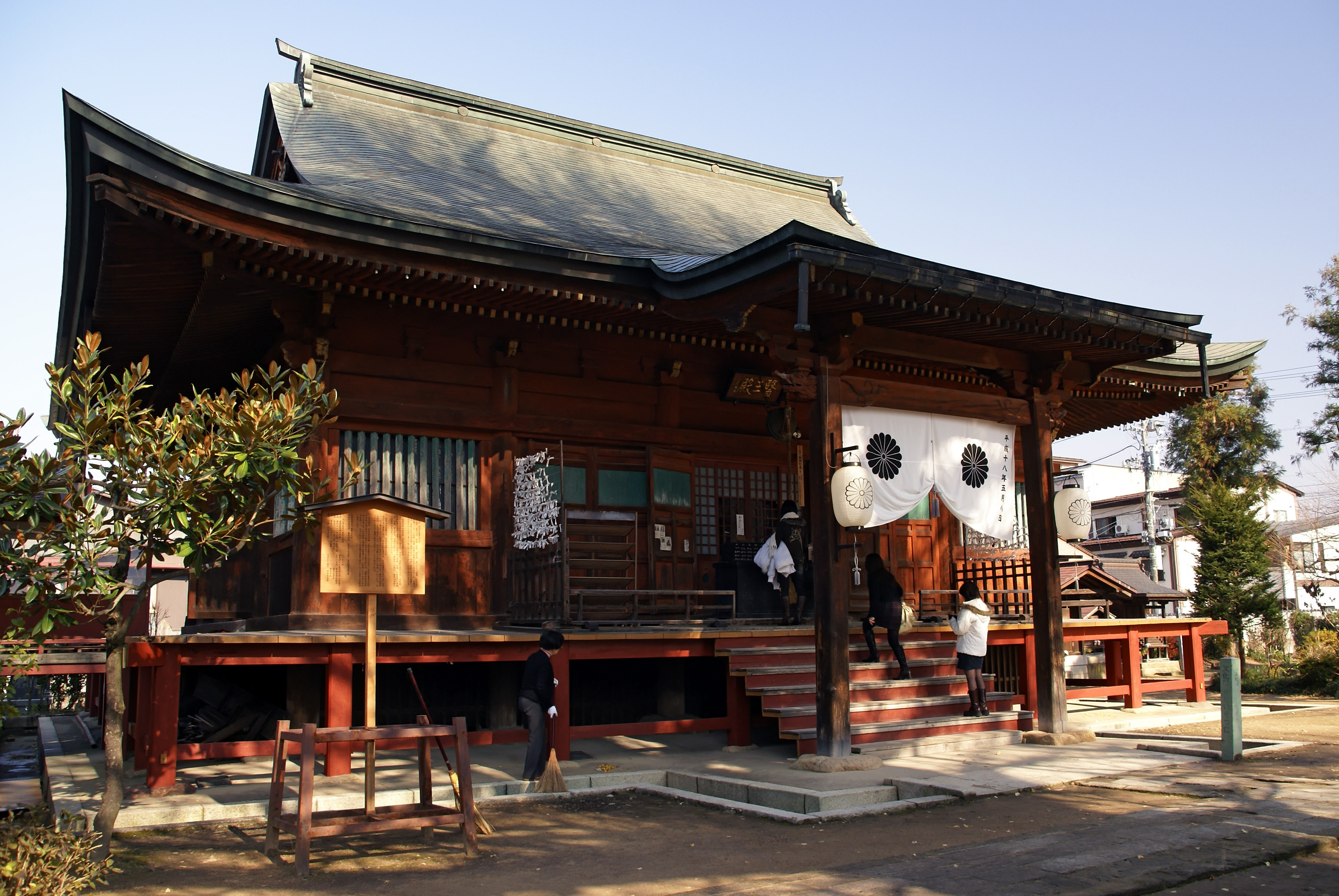
- Hida Kokubun-ji Hondō

- Hida Kokubun-ji Hida Kokubun-ji (Japan)

Religion
- Affiliation: Buddhist
- Deity: Yakushi Nyorai
- Rite: Kōyasan Shingon-shū

Location
- Location: 1-83 Sōwa-chō, Takayama-shi, Gifu-ken
- Country: Japan

Architecture
- Founder: Emperor Shōmu
- Completed: c.741

Website
- Official website
- National Historic Site of Japan National Important Cultural Property Natural Monument

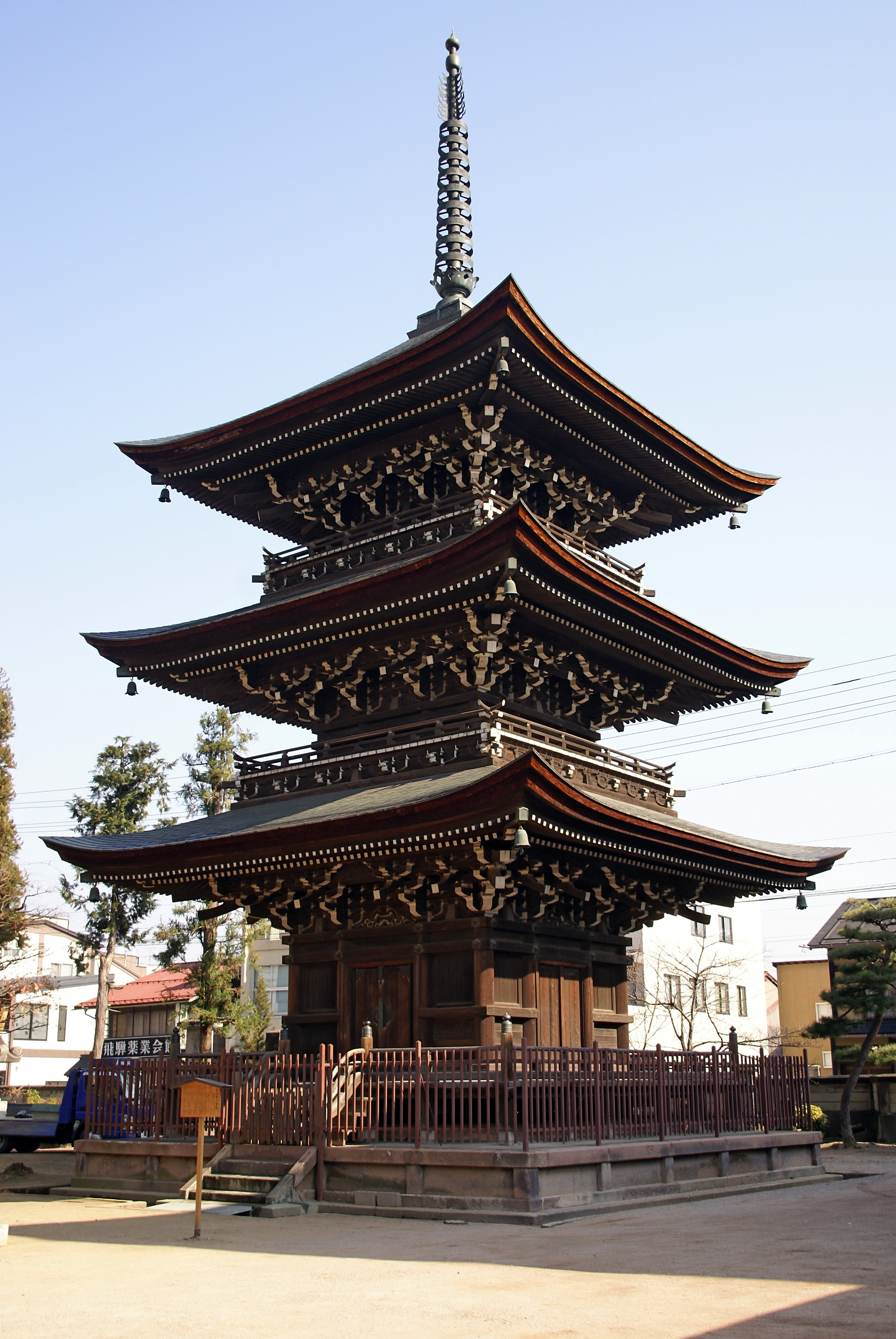
Three-story Pagoda

Hida Kokubun-ji (飛騨国分寺) is a Buddhist temple in the Sowamachi neighborhood of the city of Takayama, Gifu Prefecture, Japan, in former Hida Province. It belongs to the Kōyasan Shingon-shū and its honzon is a statue of Yakushi Nyorai. It is one of the few surviving provincial temples established by Emperor Shōmu during the Nara period (710 – 794). Due to this connection, the foundation stones of the Nara period pagoda located on temple grounds were designated as a National Historic Site in 1929.

== History ==
The Shoku Nihongi records that in 741, as the country recovered from a major smallpox epidemic, Emperor Shōmu ordered that a monastery and nunnery be established in every province, the kokubunji. These temples were built per a semi-standardized template, and were intended for the purpose of promoting Buddhism as the national religion of Japan and standardising control of imperial rule over the provinces.

The Hida Kokubun-ji is located in downtown Takayama, a short distance from Takayama Station. The exact date of construction is believed to be around 757, over 15 years from the foundation of the provincial temple system in 741. The temple claims that it was founded by the famed wandering prelate Gyōki without any historical evidence. However, records indicate that the original temple burned down in 819 and was rebuilt in 855. The existing Hondō dates from the Muromachi period. It is a National Important Cultural Property

The Nara period seven-story pagoda burned down during the Ōei period, and was reconstructed again in 1585. It was burned down again in the battles between Kanemori Nagachika and Anegakoji Yoritsuna. A three-story pagoda was built in 1615. This structure also burned down in 1791 and was rebuilt in 1820. The central stone of the Nara period pagoda, roughly square in shape, with a cylindrical base on top and a circular hole in the centre, is located to the east of the main hall, and is thus no longer in situ. It has been designated a Takayama City Historic Site

In 1695, when Takayama Castle was destroyed, the Hida Kokubun-ji inherited some of its structures, including the main gate.

== Cultural Properties ==
=== National Important Cultural Properties ===
- Hondō (本堂), mid-Muromachi period (1440/1462)
- Wooden statue of seated Yakushi Nyorai (木造薬師如来坐像), Heian period
- Wooden statue of standing Kannon Bosatsu (木造聖観音菩薩立像), Heian period
- Tachi sword (太刀), donated by the Ena clan

=== Gifu Prefecture Tangible Cultural Properties ===
- Wooden statue of seated Amida Nyori (木造阿弥陀如来坐像), Kamakura period
- Wooden statue of standing Fudō Myō-ō (木造不動明王立像), Kamakura period
- Three-story Pagoda (三重塔), Edo period

=== Takayama City Designated Tangible Cultural Properties ===
- Rōmon gate (国分寺鐘楼門), bell is dated 1514, the gate was built in 1764
- Rear gate with plaque (国分寺表門 附棟札), Edo Period

=== National Natural monument ===
- Ginkgo biloba tree, estimated age of 1250 years

== Gallery ==
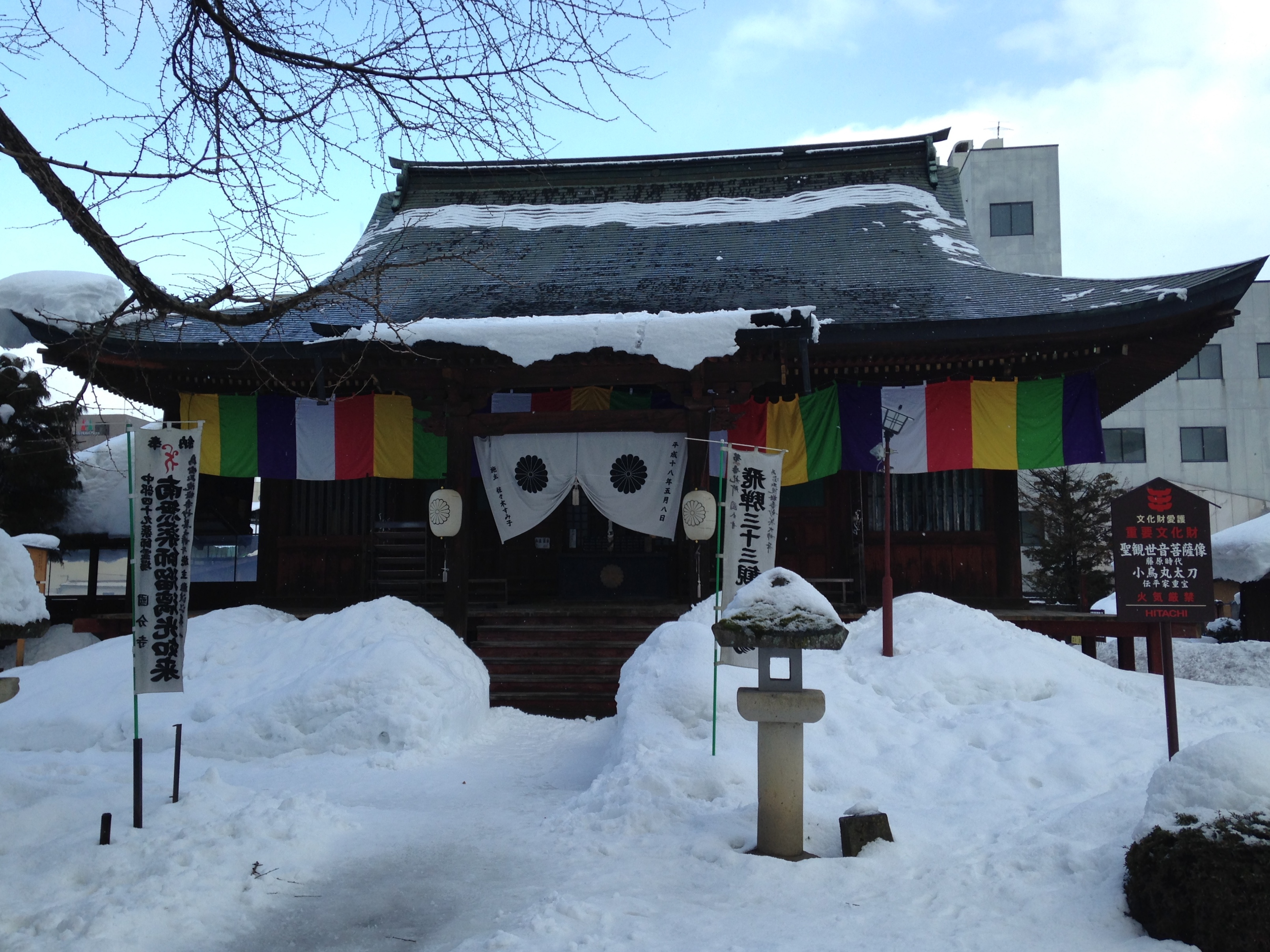
Hondō (ICP)

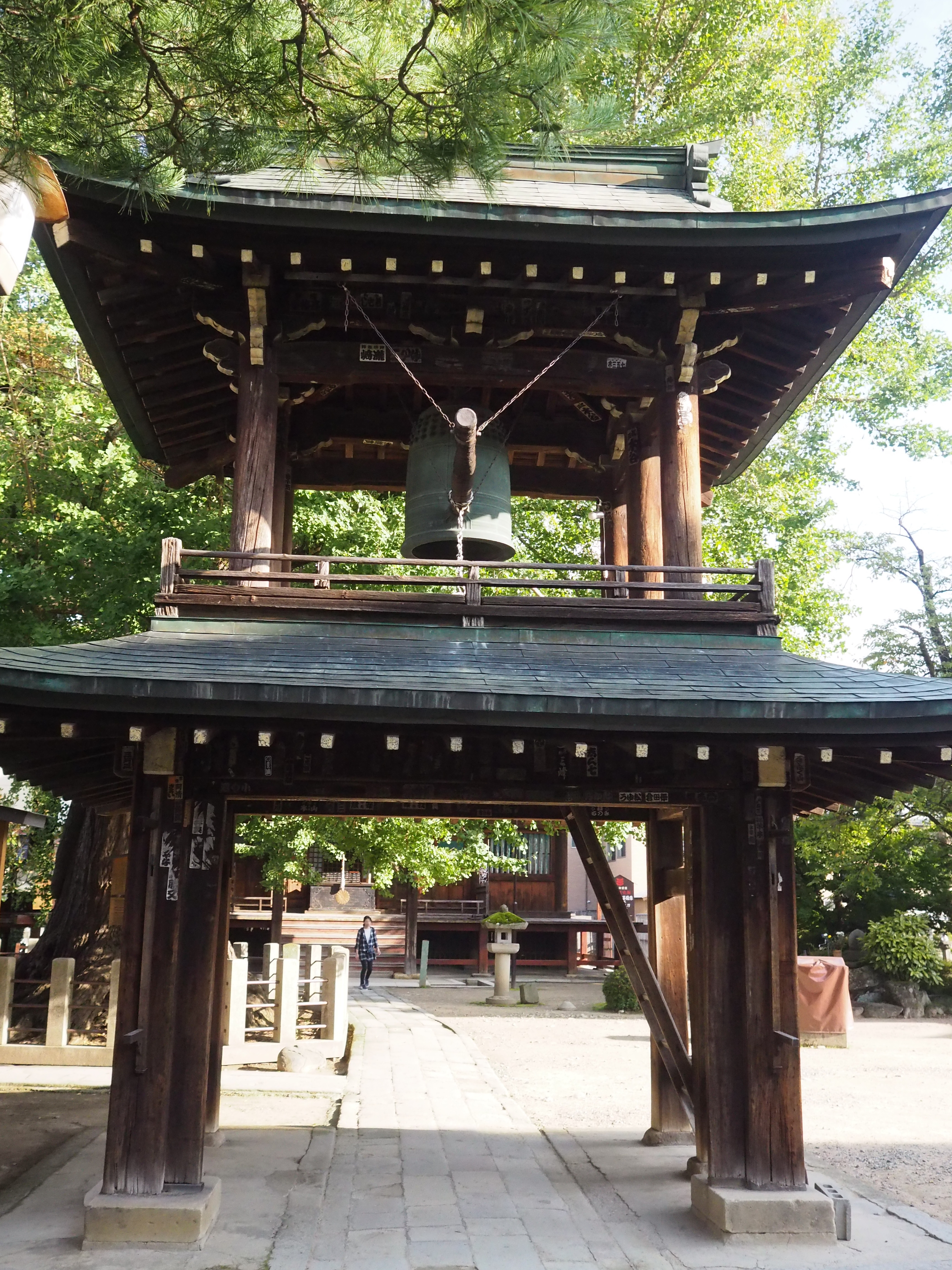
Bell Tower Gate

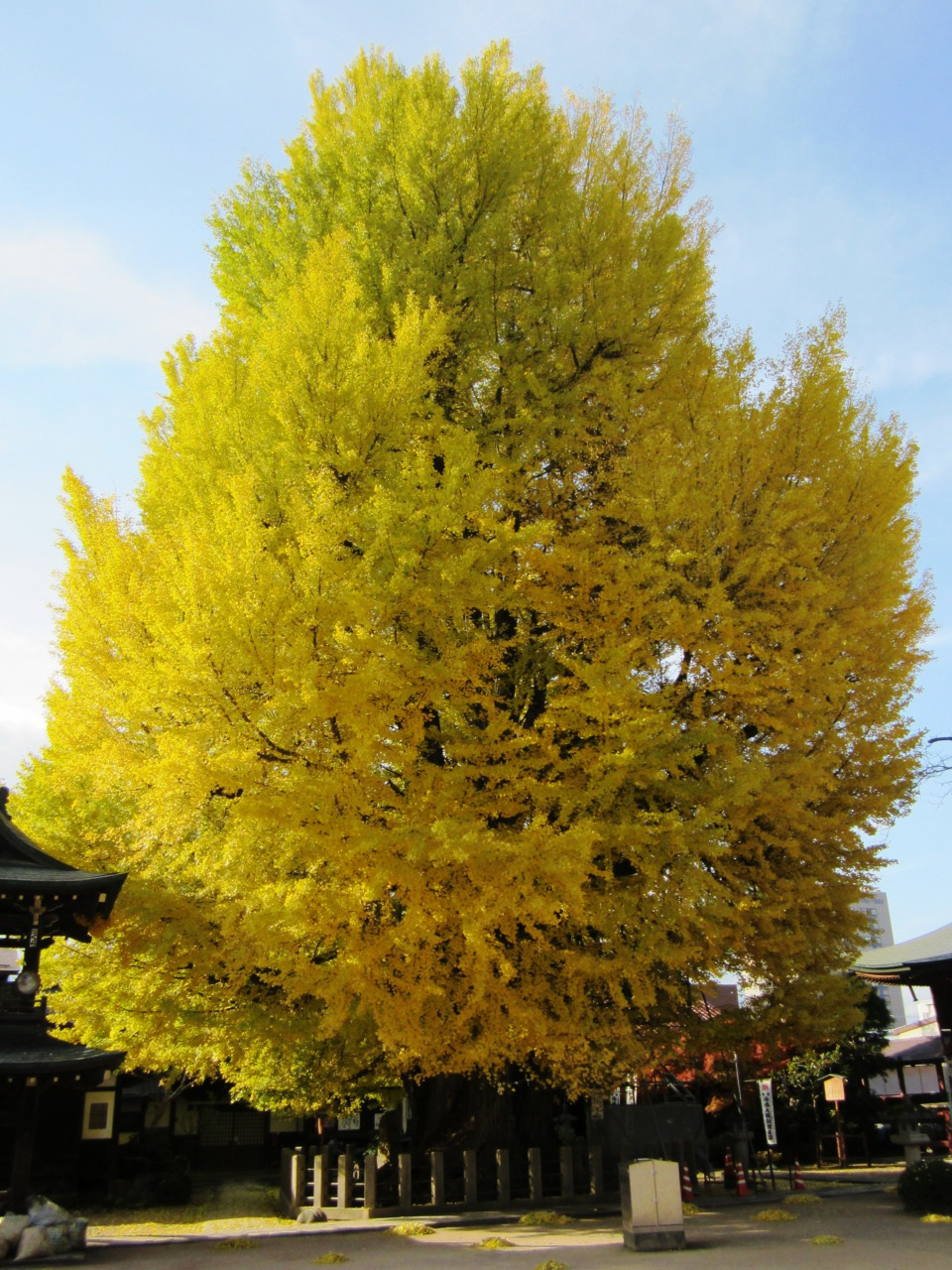
Ginkgo biloba

== Site of the Hida Kokubun-niji ==
The site of the Hida Kokubun-niji, the provincial nunnery associated with the Hida Kokubun-ji is now the precincts of the Tsujigamori Sansha (辻ヶ森三社), a Shinto shrine located approximately 900 meters to the west of the Hida Kokubun-ji site. The foundation stones of the Kokubun-niji Kondō were discovered when the shrine was renovated in 1988. The site has been designated a Takayama City Historic Site.

== See also ==
- List of Historic Sites of Japan (Gifu)
- provincial temple
