= Hida-Takayama Domain =

Japanese feudal domain located in Hida Province

Hida-Takayama Domain 飛騨高山藩
- Domain of Japan
- 1586–1692
- Mon of the Kanamori clan

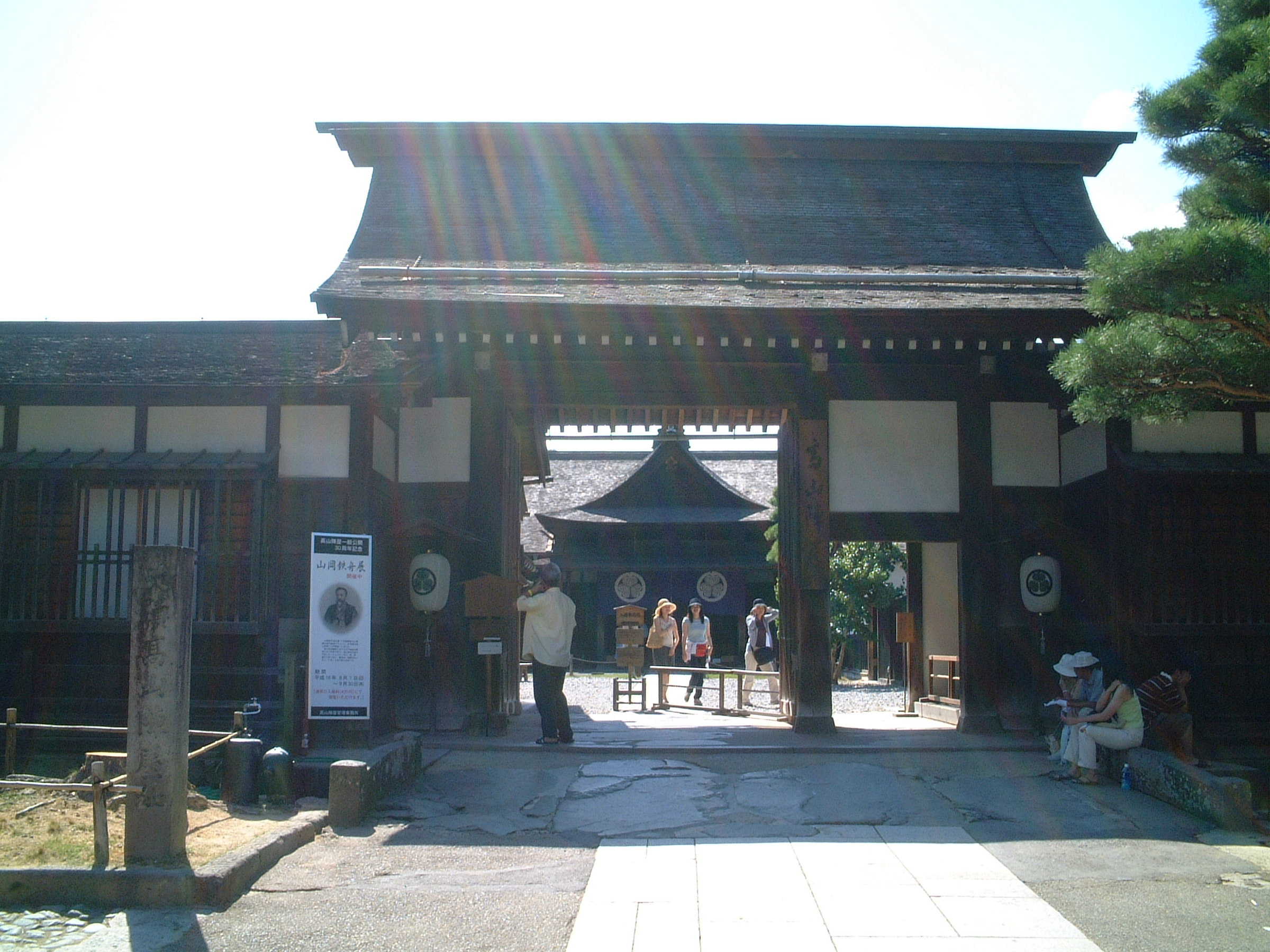
- Capital: Kanamori Castle
- Government
  - Type: Daimyō
- Historical era: Edo period
  - Established: 1586
  - Disestablished: 1692
- Today part of: Gifu Prefecture

The Hida-Takayama Domain (飛騨高山藩, Hida-Takayama-han) was a feudal domain in Hida Province, Japan. It was also called the Takayama Domain (高山藩 Takayama-han). The area was controlled by the Kanamori clan.

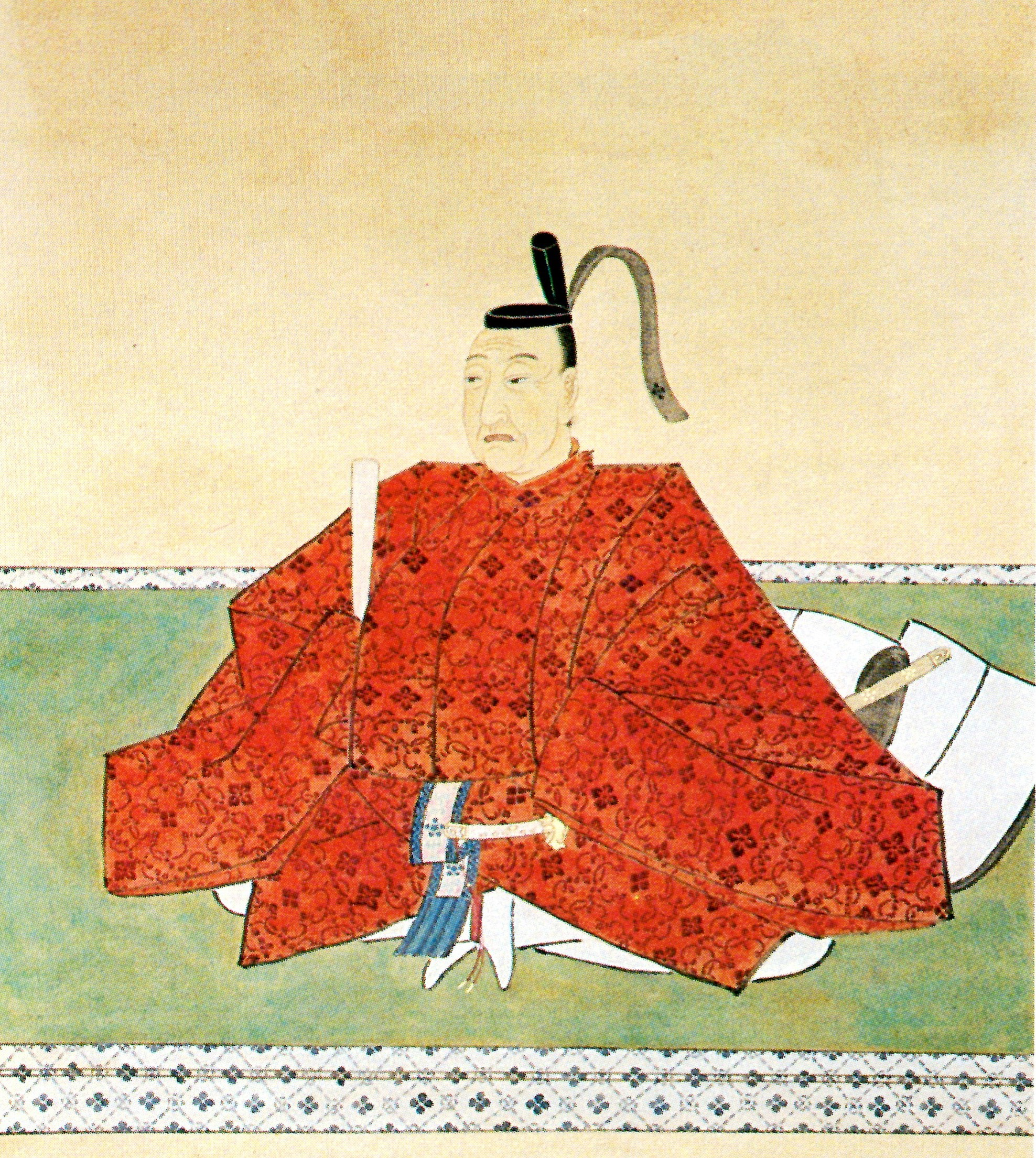
Kanamori Yoritoki, final daimyo of Hida-Takayama Domain

== History ==
Kanamori Nagachika, who was active in conquering the former Hida Province provincial governors such as the Miki clan and Aneyakoji clan, entered the province as the ruler of the province in 1586 . He began construction of Takayama Castle in 1588, and by 1600 had completed the Honmaru and Ninomaru castles. 18,000 koku of land was acquired in Kamiyuchi, Mino Province (present-day Mino City, Gifu Prefecture), and Kanata, Kawachi Province (present-day Kita Ward, Sakai City, Osaka Prefecture). Kanaoka was given an additional 3,000 koku and became the first lord of the Hida Takayama domain. When Nagachika died in 1607, the head of the family and the Hida Takayama domain were inherited by his adopted son Kanamori Kashige, and the Kamiarichi domain was succeeded by his son Kanamori Nagamitsu, who was born in his later years . The Takayama domain government was established through land surveys during the era of the third lord, Shigeyori. The Kanamori family ruled the domain for six generations, from 1586 until 1692.

== List of daimyo ==
#	Name	Tenure	Courtesy title	Court Rank	kokudaka
Kanamori clan, 1586 - 1692 (Tozama daimyo)
1	Kanamori Nagachika (金森長近)	1586 - 1608	Hyobukyo, Hida no kami (兵部卿 飛騨 守)	Junior 5th Rank, Lower Grade (従五位下)	38,000 koku
2	Kanamori Yoshishige (金森可重)	1608 - 1615	Izumo no kami (出雲神)	Junior 5th Rank, Lower Grade (従五位下)	38,000 koku
4	Kanamori Yorinao (金森頼直)	1650 - 1665	Nagato no kami (長門 の 髪)	Junior 5th Rank, Lower Grade (従五位下)	38,000 koku
5	Kanamori Yorinari (金森頼業)	1665 - 1671	Hida no kami (兵部卿 飛騨 守)	Junior 5th Rank, Lower Grade (従五位下)	38,000 koku
6	Kanamori Yoriaki (金森頼旹)	1672 - 1692	Shimo no kami, Izumo no kami (子も の 髪、出雲 の 髪)	Junior 5th Rank, Lower Grade (従五位下)	38,000 koku

== See also ==
- Han system
- List of Han
