= Hida Highlands =

Mountain range in Japan

Hida highlands
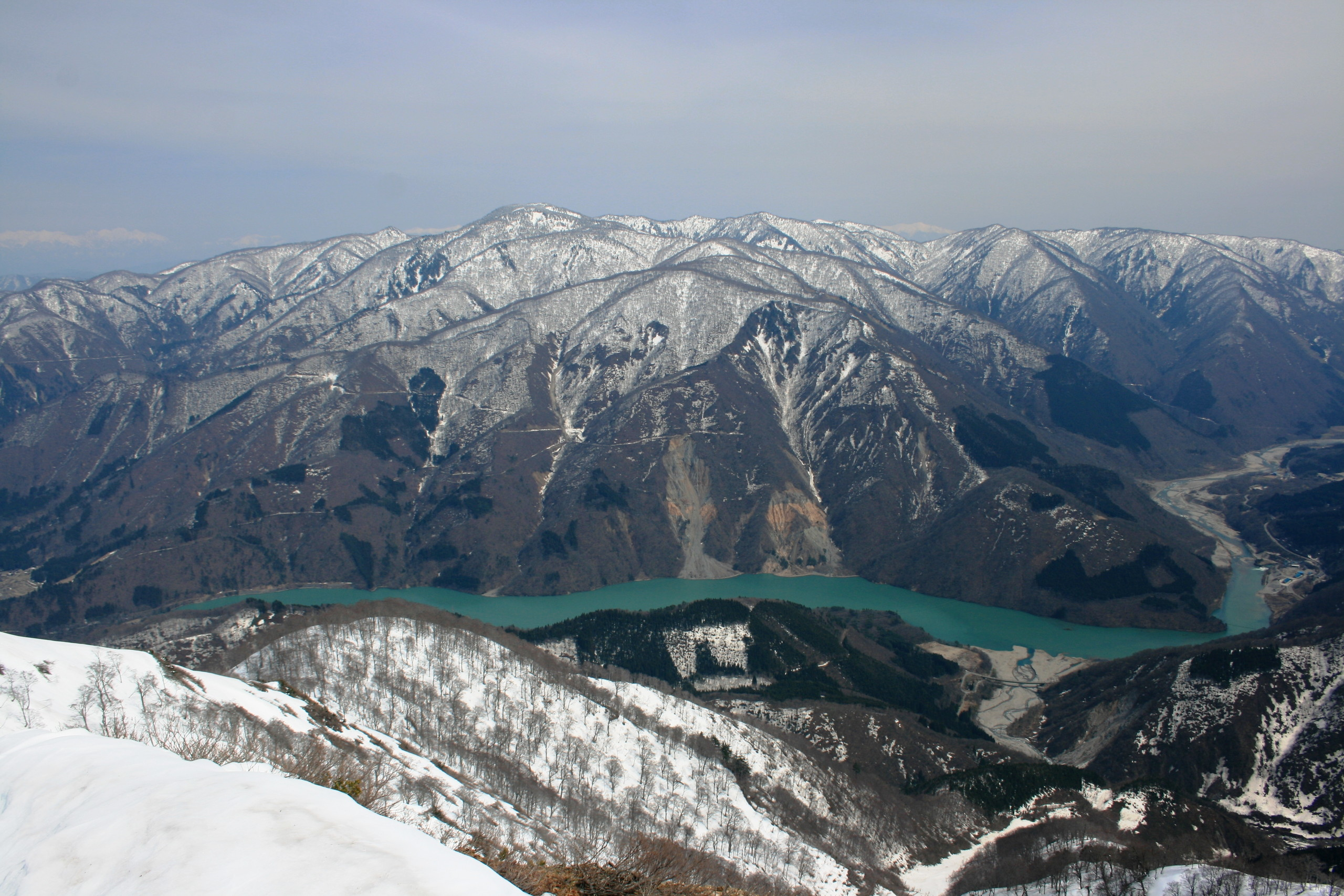
- Mount Sarugabanba

Highest point
- Peak: Mount Sarugabanba
- Elevation: 1,875 m (6,152 ft)
- Coordinates: 36°13′33″N 136°56′34″E

Naming
- Native name: 飛騨高地 (Japanese); Hida-Koti (Japanese)

Geography
- Location within Japan
- Location: Toyama Prefecture, Gifu Prefecture,
- Country: Japan

Hida Highlands (飛騨高地, Hida-kōchi) is a mountain range of Toyama Prefecture and Gifu Prefecture in Japan.

== Main Mountain ==
- Mount Shiraki（1,586m）- Have wetland.
- Mount Kongōdō（1,638m）- Have wetland.
- Mount Ningyō（1,726m）-Have a natural snow painting of twin sisters.
- Mount Sarugabanba（1,875m）-The highest peak of Hida Highlands

== See also ==
- 1586 Tenshō earthquake
- Gokayama
- Hida Province
