= Shiroyama Park =

Public park in Takayama, Gifu, Japan

Coordinates: 36°8′13.2″N 137°15′49.8″E

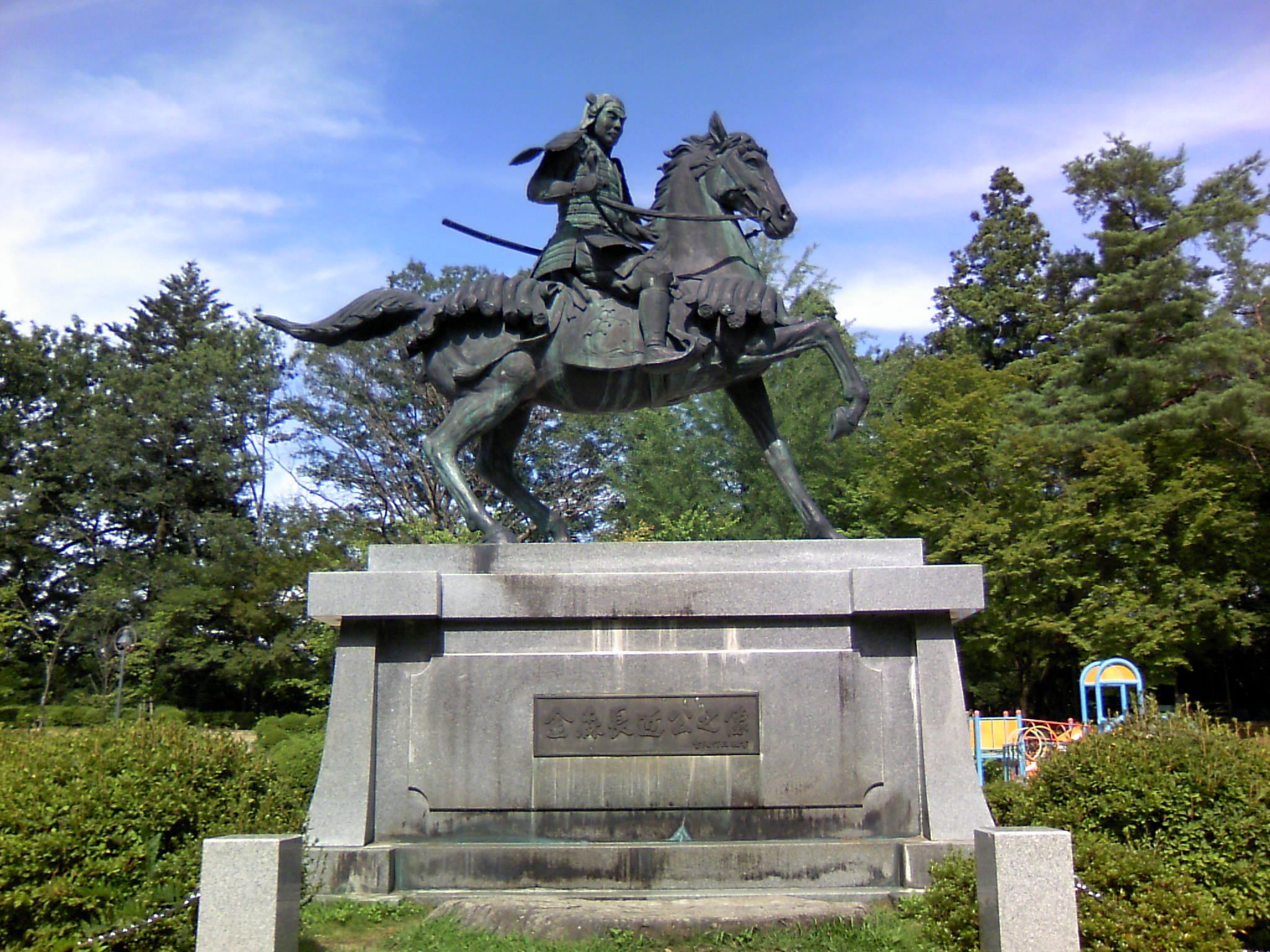
Kanamori Nagachika, founder of Takayama Castle

Shiroyama Park (城山公園, Shiroyama Kōen) is a public park located in Takayama, Gifu Prefecture, Japan. In 1873, the park was established in the mountainous area around the ruins of Takayama Castle. The park's name means "castle mountain."

== Outline ==
The park covers an area of 24.3 hectares (60 acres). It has over 1,000 Yoshino cherry trees and is popular in the spring time when they are in bloom.
