= Anekōji clan =

Anekōji 姉小路
- Home province: Hida Province
- Parent house: Fujiwara clan
- Titles: Daimyo; Kokushi
- Founder: Anekōji Ietsuna
- Final ruler: Anekōji Chikatsuna
- Founding year: 1333
- Dissolution: 1585
- Cadet branches: Anenokōji clan

The Anekōji clan (姉小路氏, Anekōji-shi) was a Japanese samurai family descending from the Fujiwara clan. During the Sengoku period, they served as daimyo (feudal lord) of Hida Province. The clan is also known as Anegakōji clan.

== Origins ==
The Anekōji clan was founded by Anekōji Ietsuna, a descendant of Fujiwara no Morotada (Ko-Ichijō lineage) of the Hokke house of the Fujiwara clan, a powerful family of Japanese imperial regents and court nobility, founded by Fujiwara no Kamatari in the 7th century. Ietsuna founded the clan after he was made Governor of Hida Province during the Kenmu Restoration in 1333.

== History ==
After Anekōji Ietsuna, was made Governor of Hida Province in 1333, the family ruled the province from Kojima Castle. The Anekōji of Hida Province along with Kitabatake of Ise Province and Ichijō of Tosa Province were called "the three kokushi families". Members of the family also served as courtiers at the Imperial Court for several generations.

Although they were active at Kojima Castle in their home province, Anekōji Yoritsuna fought against Oda Nobunaga and Toyotomi Hideyoshi during the Sengoku period. However, in 1585, the Anekōji clan was destroyed by Hideyoshi's general Kanamori Nagachika. The last known member of the Anekōji clan was Yoritsuna's son, Chikatsuna.

== See also ==
- Anenokōji clan
- Kitabatake clan
- Kanamori Nagachika
