= Anenokōji clan =

Anenokōji clan (姉小路氏, Anenokōji-shi), is a Japanese kuge kin group. A cadet branch of the clan were daimyōs of Hida Province.

== History ==
The clan claims descent from Sanjō Sanefusa (1146–1224) of the Fujiwara clan.

The head of the clan became a kazoku count in the Meiji period.
