= Masaya Imanishi =

Masaya Imanishi (今西 方哉, Imanishi Masaya; born 13 August 1947) is a Japanese ceramic artist.

== Biography ==
Masaya Imanishi was born in Nara, Nara, Japan, in 1947. He graduated from the Kyoto City University of Arts and then learned porcelain glazing from Yūzō Kondo（近藤悠三）who was Living National Treasure in Japan. He was certified as a Nihon Kogeikai regular member in 1979.

After that Imanishi continued to create works at Akishino Kiln in Nara. In 1991, he studied modeling and ceramics in the United States as Overseas Study Program Awardee by the Agency for Cultural Affairs. During that time he made many works and held personal exhibitions and artist demonstrations at the Archie Bray Foundation for the Ceramic Arts and various universities.

The theme for his works is "the energy of nature", stemming from how he was deeply moved by his observations of nature in the United States, and particularly the American West.

== Museums with holdings ==
- Nara, Nara, Japan
- Montana, U.S.A.
- Nara Art Museum, Japan
- The Shigaraki Ceramic Cultural Park Museum, Japan
- Cleveland Museum of Art, U.S.A.
- Everson Museum of Art, U.S.A.
- Seattle Art Museum, U.S.A.
- Holter Museum of Art, U.S.A.
- Archie Bray Foundation for the Ceramic Arts, U.S.A.
- Canton Museum of Art, U.S.A.

== Galleries & Permanent Collections ==
- Dai Ichi Arts, Ltd., New York, USA
