= Jin'ya =

Type of administrative headquarters of the Tokugawa shogunate

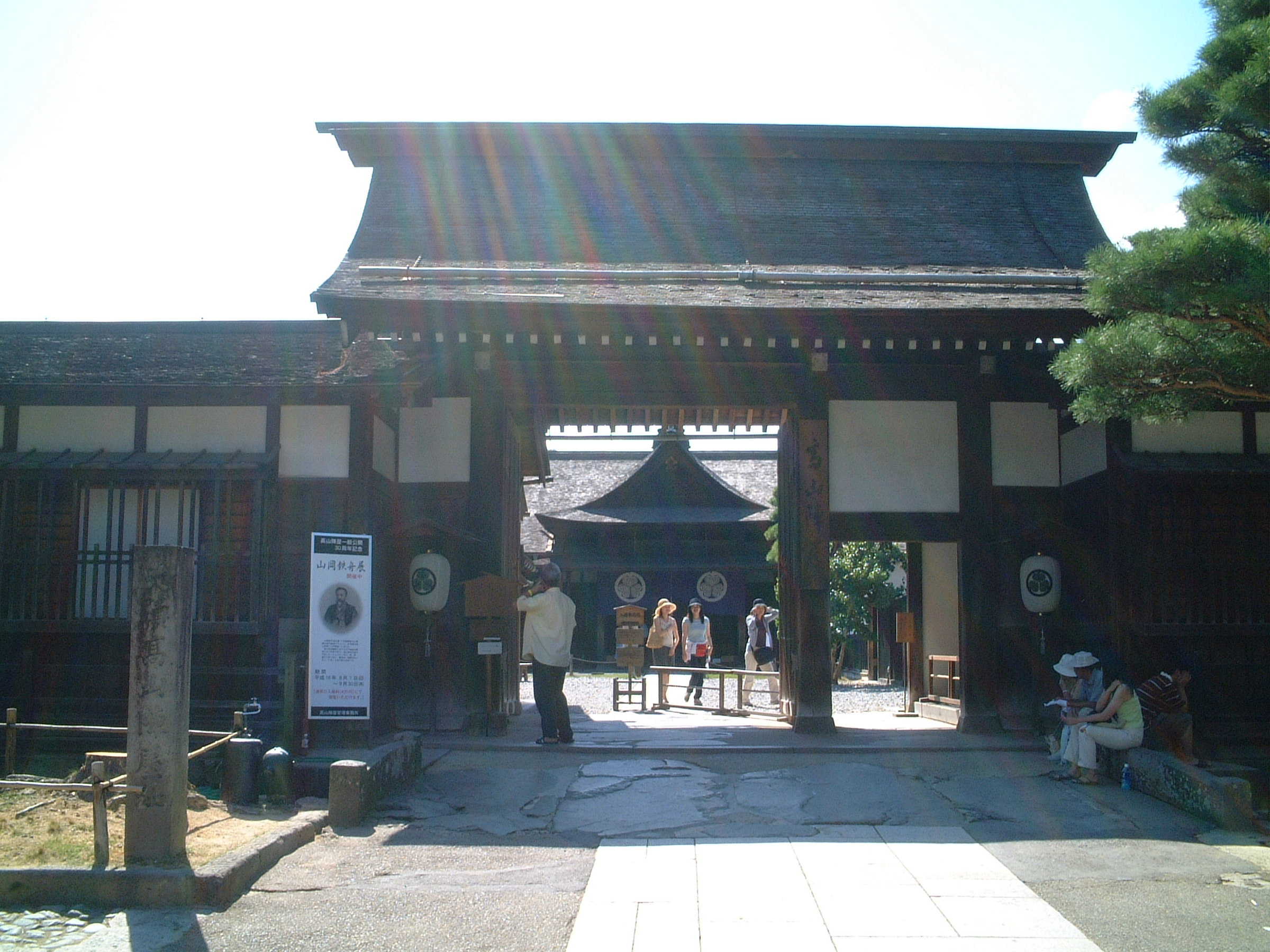
The Takayama Jin'ya, a surviving Edo period jin'ya in Takayama, Gifu Prefecture, was the administrative headquarters of Hida Province.

A jin'ya (陣屋) was a type of administrative headquarters in the Tokugawa Shogunate during the Edo period of Japanese history.

Jin'ya served as the seat of the administration for a small domain, a province, or additional parcels of land. Jin'ya housed the residence of the head of administration and the associated grain storehouse for the kokudaka system. Jin'ya were equivalent in function to Japanese castles (城, shiro), typically used as the administrative seats of larger domains. Generally, domains assessed at 30,000 koku or less had a jin'ya instead of a castle. Additionally, jin'ya were found on shogunal lands and those headed by hatamoto, and within larger domains served as district headquarters (gun daikan-sho) and in geographical exclaves. Some jin'ya were fortified, such as the Komono Jin'ya in Komono, Mie Prefecture, which featured a watchtower (yagura) mimicking the donjon of a castle. Others jin'ya had moats or earthen walls, in some cases left over from an earlier castle on the site.

The "three great jin'ya" were at the Iino, Tokuyama and Tsuruga Domains.

== See also ==
- Imanishi Family Residence
- Japanese architecture

== Sources ==
- This article incorporates material from 陣屋 (Jin'ya) in the Japanese Wikipedia, retrieved on February 24, 2008.
