= Imanishi Family Residence =

Coordinates: 34°30′24″N 135°47′01″E

The Imanishi Family Residence (今西家住宅, Imanishi-ke jūtaku) is one of a Group of Traditional Buildings in Imai-cho, Kashihara, Nara Prefecture Japan. It dates to 1650 and has been designated an Important Cultural Property.

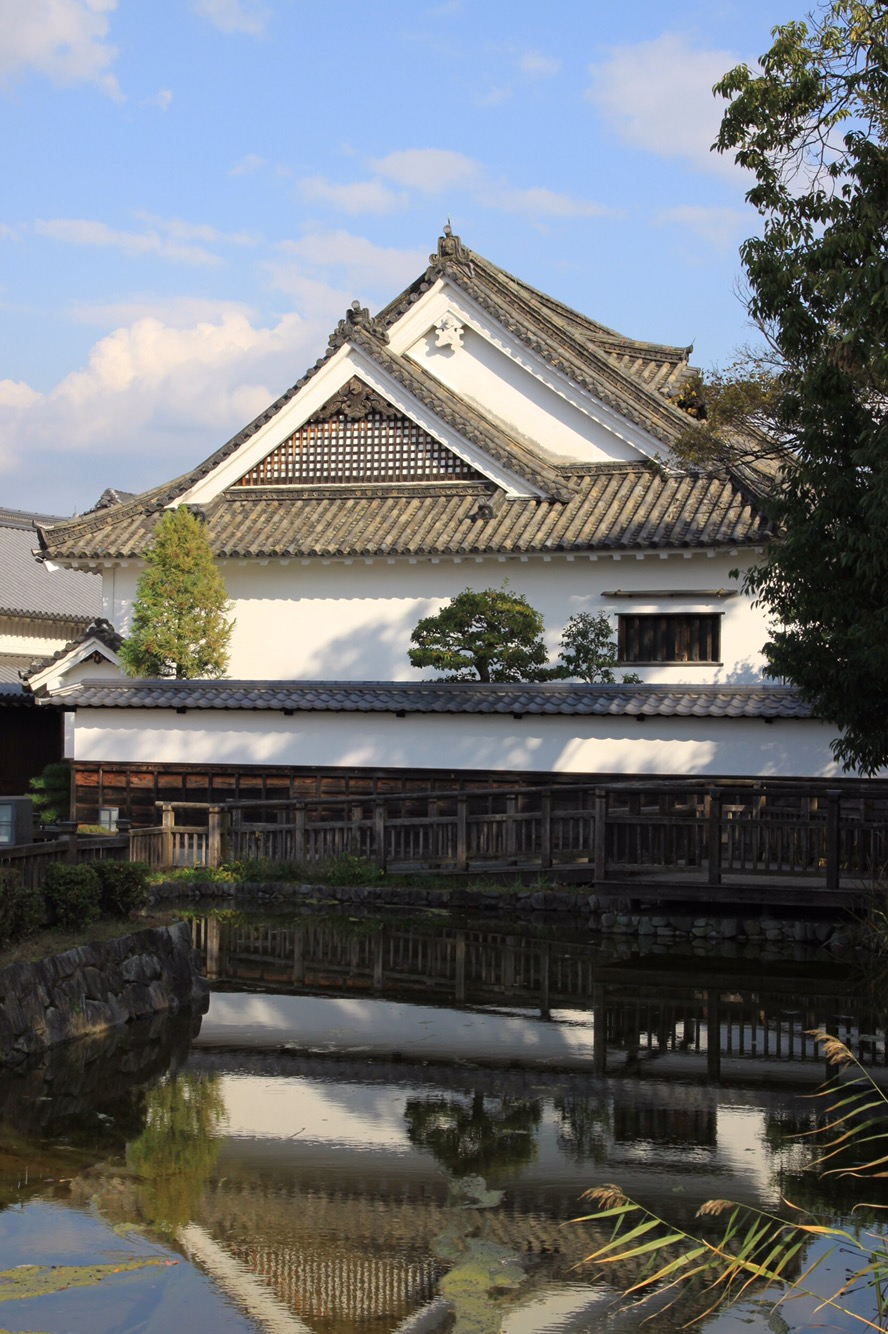
Imanishi house from the west side

As well as being the minka or machiya of the Imanishi family, it served as the jinya, or centre and court, of Imai, then an autonomous town.

Its roof is made in the form of "yatsumune-zukuri" (八棟造), which means "complicated roof style with multiple ridges and bargeboards".

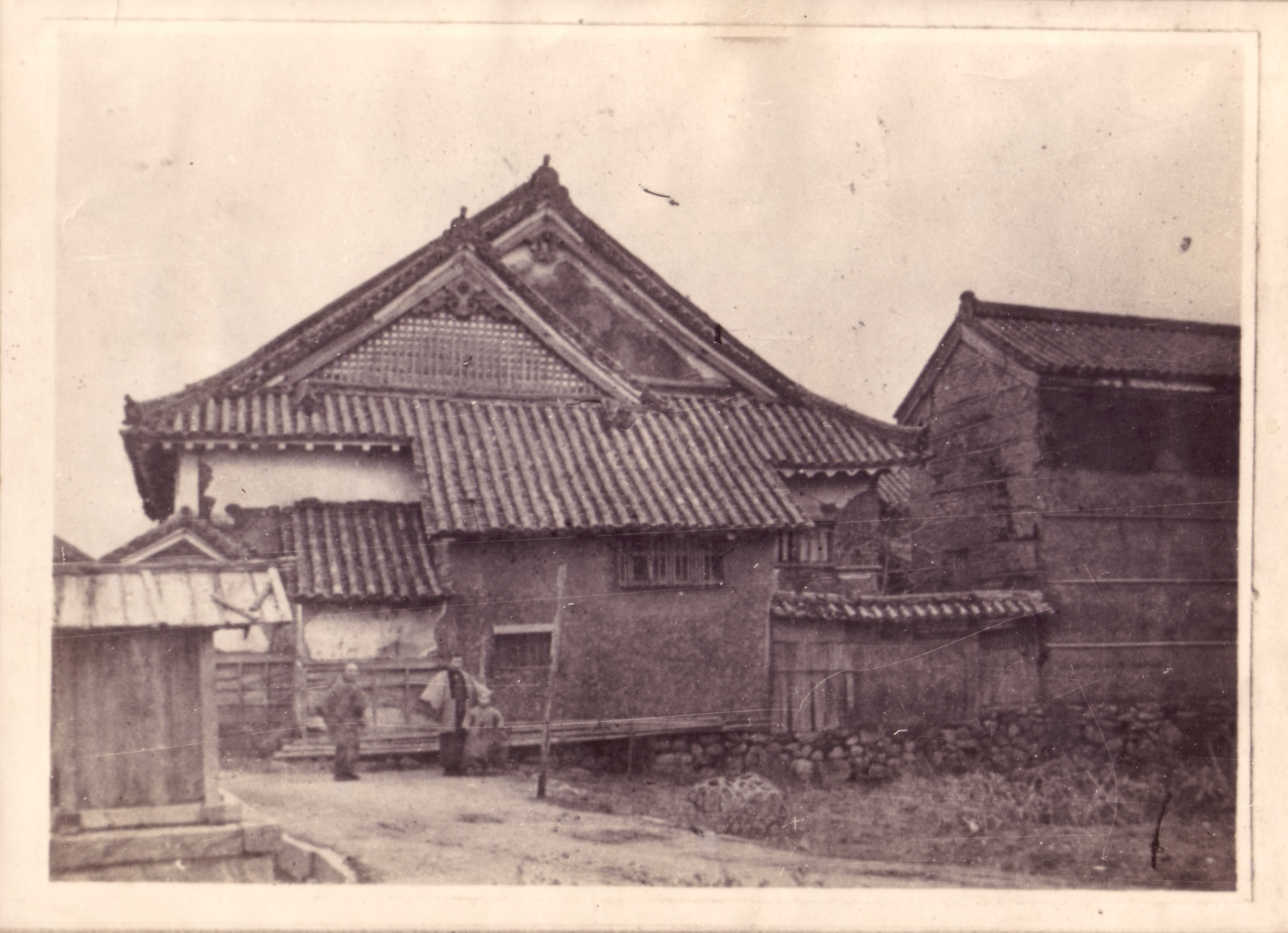
Photo of Imanishi family house in the Taishō period

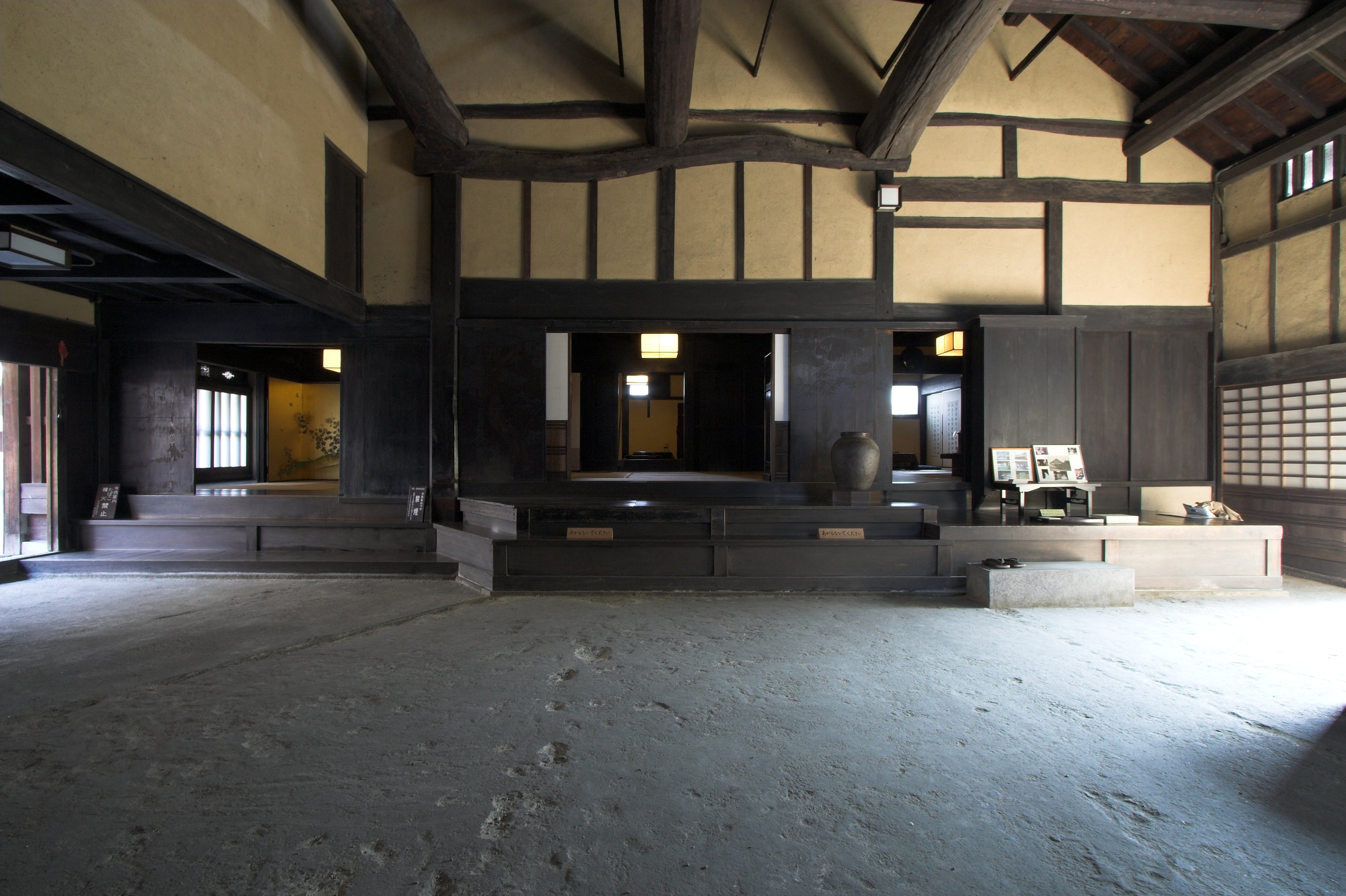
Interior; this floor used to function as a local court
