= Kanamori Nagachika =

16th-century Japanese samurai

- 金森 長近
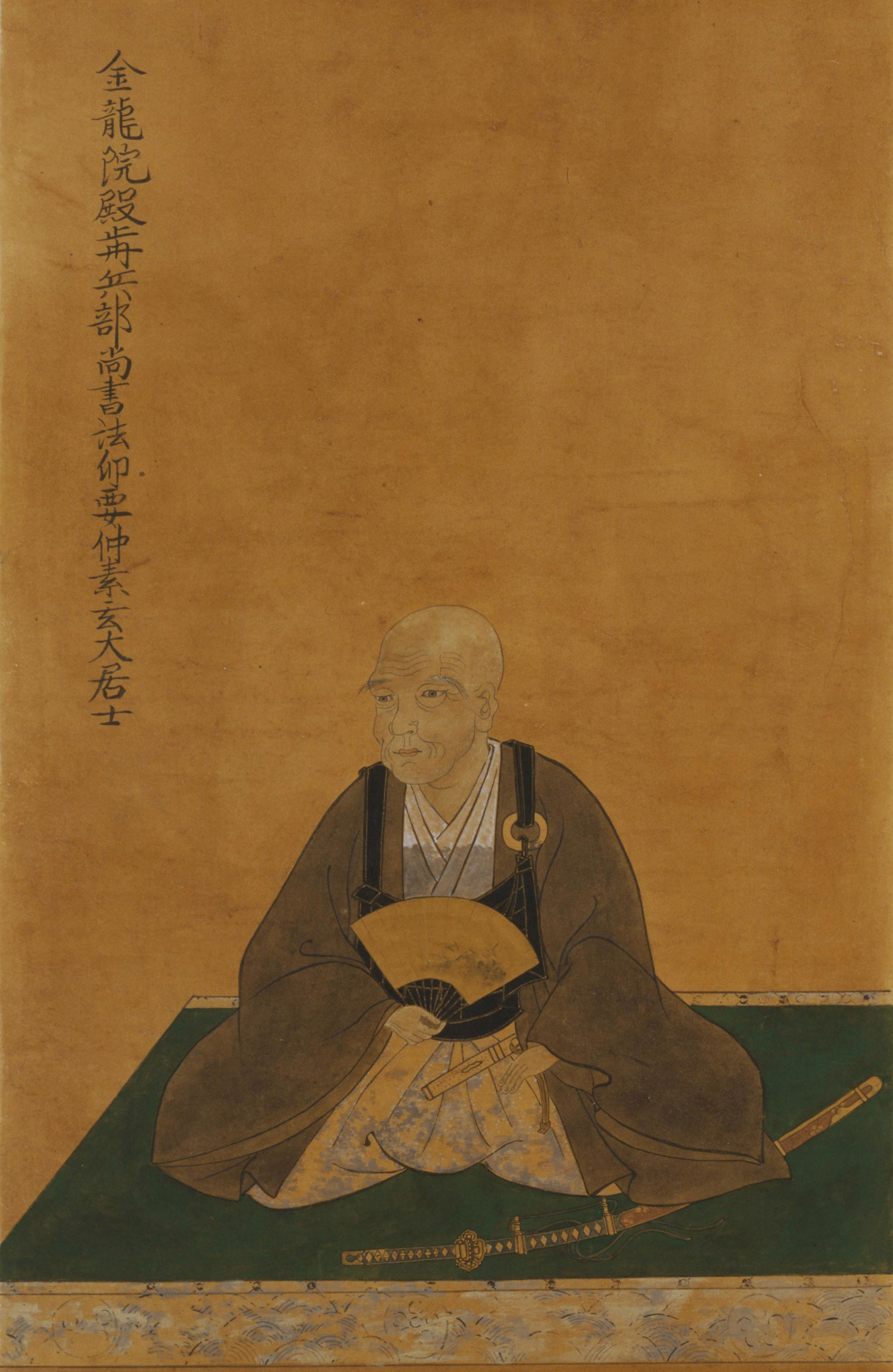

Lord of Ōno Castle (Echizen Province)
- In office 1580–1608

Lord of Takayama Castle
- In office 1588–1608

Personal details
- Born: 1524
- Died: September 20, 1608 (aged 83–84)

Military service
- Allegiance: Saito clan Oda clan Toyotomi clan Tokugawa clan
- Battles/wars: Battle of Inabayama (1567); Battle of Nagashino (1575); Echizen Campaign (1579); Battle of Shizugatake (1583); Battle of Komaki and Nagakute (1584); Attack on Anekōji clan (1585); Battle of Sekigahara (1600)

Kanamori Nagachika (金森 長近; 1524 – September 20, 1608) was a Japanese samurai who lived from the Sengoku period into the early Edo period. He was the first ruler of the Kanamori clan and served as a retainer of the Saito, Oda, Toyotomi, and Tokugawa clans. Later in his life, he also became a daimyō.

== Biography ==
Nagachika first served the Saitō clan of Mino Province; however, after their Demise at Battle of Inabayama 1567, he became a retainer of Oda Nobunaga.

On February 19, 1570, Imai Sokyu sent urgent news that Akagi Nobuyasu defeated the army of Miyoshi clan in Awaji province along with Nagachika and Kawajiri Hidetaka.

In 1575, at Battle of Nagashino, he and Sakai Tadatsugu ambush Takeda troops and killed Takeda Nobuzane, a younger brother of Shingen.

In 1580, he took part to suppress the Echizen Ikkō-ikki, and was granted Ōno Castle by Nobunaga.

In 1582, on Honnoji Incident, Nagachika's eldest son and heir, Kanamori Naganori, died along with Oda Nobutada in fighting at the Nijō Castle.

Following Nobunaga's death, in 1583, at Battle of Shizugatake, Nagachika at first sided with Shibata Katsuie. But after Maeda Toshiie switched sides to Hideyoshi's, Nagachika followed in kind and withdrew without fighting, then gave his loyalty to Hideyoshi.

Thereafter in 1584, Nagachika served under the command of Hideyoshi in the Battle of Komaki-Nagakute.

In 1585, at Hideyoshi "Toyama Campaign", he was dispatched to destroy the Anegakōji clan of Hida Province and become the ruler of Matsukura Castle and Takayama Castle.

In 1600, he later gave his support to Tokugawa Ieyasu during the Sekigahara campaign and led 1,140 men to the Battle of Sekigahara.

Nagachika was also a tea master and an admirer of Sen no Rikyū. After Toyotomi Hideyoshi ordered Rikyū's death, Nagachika sheltered Rikyū's son, Sen Dōan.

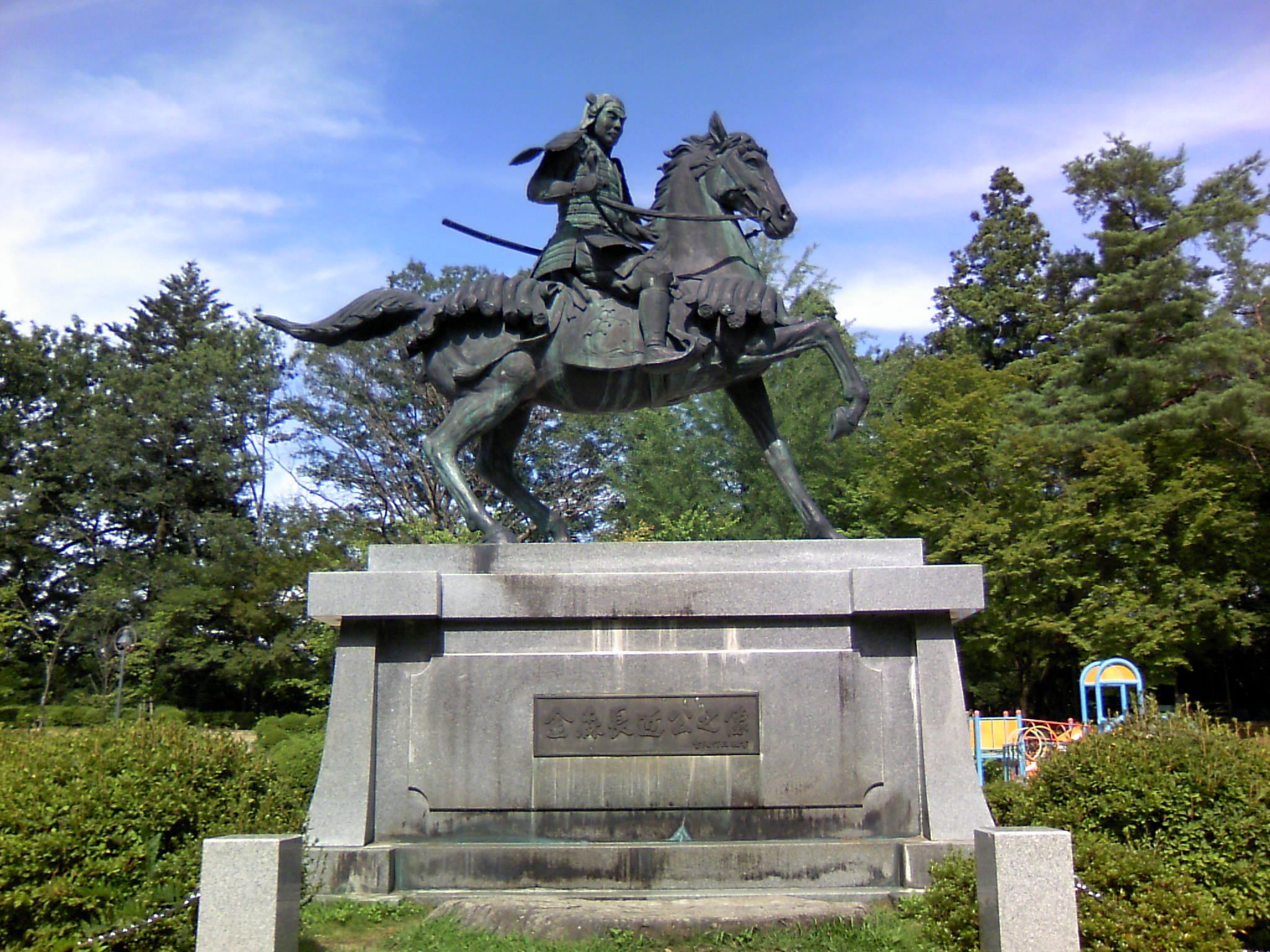
Statue of Kanamori Nagachika at Shiroyama Park, Gifu Prefecture, Japan
