= Hida Province =

Former province of Japan

Hida Province 飛騨国
- pre-Meiji period Japan
- 701–1871
- Map of Japanese provinces (1868) with Hida Province highlighted
- Capital: Takayama
- Area
  - Coordinates: 36°30′N 135°45′E
- History
  - Ritsuryō system: 701
  - Disestablished: 1871
- Today part of: Gifu Prefecture

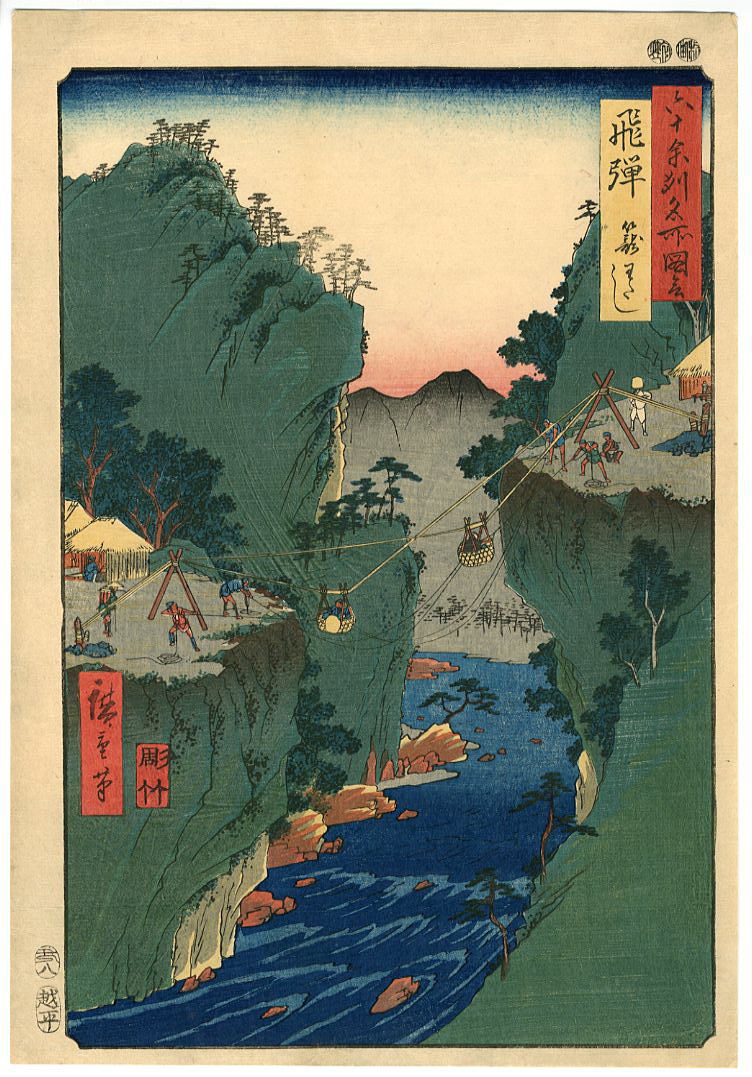
Hiroshige ukiyo-e "Hida" in "The Famous Scenes of the Sixty States" (六十余州名所図会), depicting an aerial ropeway

Hida Province (飛騨国, Hida no Kuni; Japanese pronunciation: [çí.dä̀ (nò̞ kɯ̈̀.ɲ̟ì)]) was a province of Japan in the area that is today the northern portion of Gifu Prefecture in the Chūbu region of Japan. Hida bordered on Echizen, Mino, Shinano, Etchū, and Kaga Provinces. It was part of Tōsandō Circuit. Its abbreviated name was Hishū (飛州). Under the Engishiki classification system, Hida was ranked as an "inferior country" (下国) and a middle country (中国) in terms of its importance and distance from the capital. Currently, the entire area of the former Hida Province consists of the cities of Hida, Takayama and most of the city of Gero, and the village of Shirakawa, in Ōno District .

== Overview ==
"Hida" indicates the west side of the Hida Mountains. The climate is similar to that of the provinces of the Sea of Japan, with extremely heavy snow in winter. Hida traditionally had strong economic and cultural ties with the neighboring Etchū Province due to the ease of transportation and poor connections to the Pacific coast, from which it was blocked by mountain ranges and poor transportation. Historically the region was written as "Yota" or "Wita". This notation still is present and it can be seen in titles such as "Yuta High School" etc.

== History ==
=== Ancient and classical Hida ===
Hida existed as a political entity before the Ritsuryō system and the implementation of the Taihō Code of the Nara period. Ancient Hida was governed by a Kuni no miyatsuko, but the area was so depopulated, a tax exception was granted. By the Nara period, the area was already so noted for its carpentry that the official court position of Hida-no-takumi (飛騨工) consisting of two craftsmen from Hida Province was established. The ruins of the provincial capital of the province have been located in "Kokufu-cho" of the city of Takayama, and the provincial temple, Hida Kokubun-ji is also located in the city, as is the province's ichinomiya, the Minashi Shrine.

During the Heian and Kamakura period, Hida's extensive forests were a major source of timber and metals for other provinces. River traffic from Hida down to Mino Province and Owari Province was heavy. By the Muromachi period, the Kyōgoku clan held the position of shugo for many generations; however, towards the start of the Sengoku period, the province was fragmented into many small warlord territories, with the province as a whole becoming contested territory between the powerful Takeda clan based in Kai Province and the Uesugi clan based in Echigo Province. The Ikkō-ikki movement from neighboring Kaga and Etchū Provinces also added to the instability.

=== Medieval and pre-modern Hida ===
During the Sengoku period, the Miki clan changed its name to Anenokōji and temporarily unified the Hida area. After the Honnō-ji Incident, Kanamori Nagachika, one of Oda Nobunaga's and later Toyotomi Hideyoshi's generals, was sent to occupy Hida Province and became its daimyō. He built Takayama Castle and later fought on the side of Tokugawa Ieyasu at the Battle of Sekigahara. As a result, he was reconfirmed as daimyō of Takayama Domain under the Tokugawa shogunate with a kokudaka of 38,000 koku. His heirs ruled Takayama for six generations, until Kanamori Yoritoki was transferred to Kaminoyama Domain in Dewa Province in 1692.

From 1692 until the end of the Edo period, Hida Province was tenryō territory ruled directly by the Tokugawa shogunate. The official in charge of Hida was the Hida Gundai (飛騨郡代). Initially, this was a daikon-level position located at a daikansho built on the site of the shimoyashiki of Takayama Castle and was held by 11 men from 1692 to 1765. The daikansho was then elevated to that of a jin'ya and the final 14 holders of the office were styled Gundai rather than Daikan. The Takayama jin'ya has the distinction of being the only jin'ya on tenyrō territory. The area under its control consisted of 414 villages with a total kokudaka of 57,182 koku.

=== Meiji period and beyond ===
Following the Meiji Restoration and the abolition of the han system in 1871, the post of Hida Gundai was also abolished. The area was divided into three districts and was renamed "Hida Prefecture" on July 12, 1868. Ten days later, it was renamed "Takayama Prefecture" and on December 31, 1871, became "Chikuma Prefecture". On August 21, 1876, Chikuma was merged with the former Mino Province to become Gifu Prefecture.

Also in this era, the Hida region became a center for the nationally important silk-making industry, leading to many women traveling there from the surrounding regions for work.

== Historical districts ==
Hida Province consisted of three districts:

- Gifu Prefecture
  - Mashita District (益田郡) - dissolved
  - Ōno District (大野郡)
  - Yoshiki District (吉城郡) - dissolved

== See also ==
- Hida Highlands

== Other websites ==
Media related to Hida Province at Wikimedia Commons

- Murdoch's map of provinces, 1903
