= Hotei Station =

Railway station in Kōnan, Aichi Prefecture, Japan

Hotei Station 布袋駅

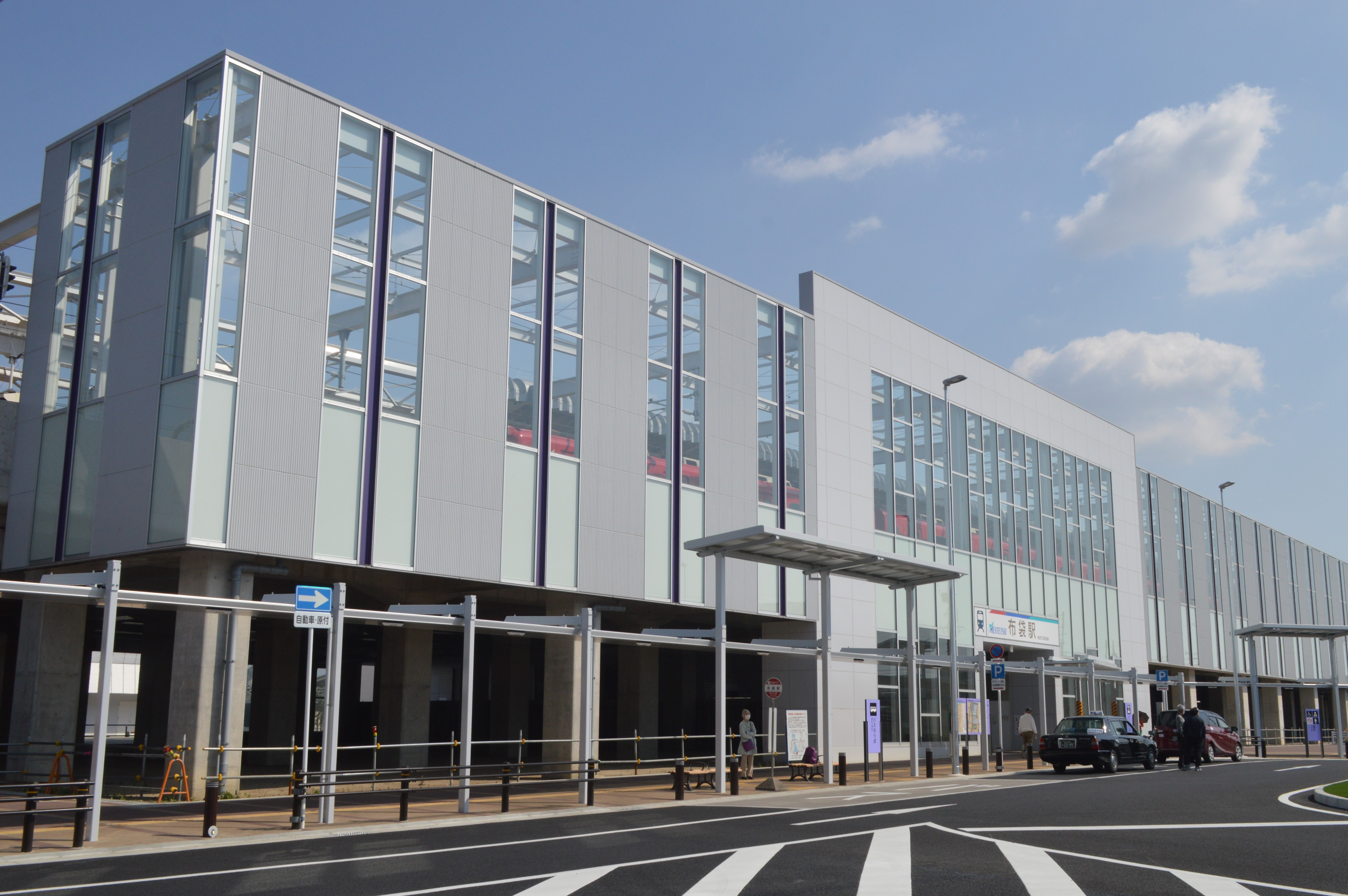

General information
- Location: Hotei-chō Nishiho-173, Kōnan-shi, Aichi-ken 483-8141; Japan
- Coordinates: 35.3169°N 136.8728°E
- Operator: Meitetsu
- Line: ■ Meitetsu Inuyama Line
- Distance: 15.2 kilometers from Biwajima
- Platforms: 2 island platforms

Other information
- Status: Staffed
- Station code: IY09
- Website: Official website

History
- Opened: 6 August 1912

Passengers
- FY2017: 8911

Services
Preceding station	Meitetsu	Following station
Iwakura towards Shimo Otai	Inuyama Line Rapid Express Express	Kōnan towards Shin-Unuma
Ishibotoke towards Shimo Otai	Inuyama Line Semi Express Local	Kōnan towards Shin-Unuma
Location
- Location within Aichi Prefecture Location within Japan

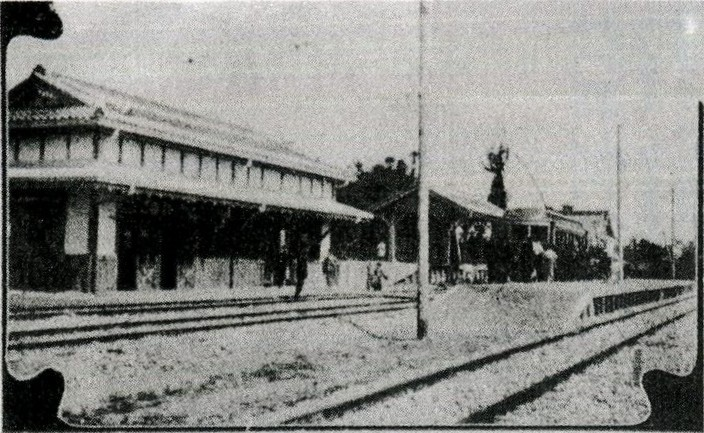
Hotei Station in 1912

Hotei Station (布袋駅, Hotei-eki) is a railway station in the city of Kōnan, Aichi Prefecture, Japan, operated by Meitetsu.

== Lines ==
Hotei Station is served by the Meitetsu Inuyama Line, and is located 15.2 kilometers from the starting point of the line at Biwajima.

== Station layout ==
Hotei Station consists of two eight-car island platforms serving four tracks, connected to the station building by a level crossing. Before the temporary platforms came into use, track 1 was only long enough for six-car trains. Access to the platforms from the old station building was via a level crossing; Hotei was the last station on the Inuyama Line where this was the case. The station has automated ticket machines, Manaca automated turnstiles and is staffed.

=== Platforms ===
1	■ Inuyama Line	For Kōnan, Inuyama, Meitetsu-Gifu, and Shin Kani
2	■ Inuyama Line	For Kōnan, Inuyama, Meitetsu-Gifu, and Shin Kani
3	■ Inuyama Line	For Iwakura, Meitetsu-Nagoya, and the Tsurumai Line
4	■ Inuyama Line	For Iwakura, Meitetsu-Nagoya, and the Tsurumai Line

== Station history ==
Hotei Station opened with the line on 6 August 1912. The station served the town of Hotei, Niwa District, until it was merged into the new city of Kōnan in 1954. One of two stations in the city, it has more platforms, but is less central and quieter, than Kōnan Station. The surrounding area is largely quiet and residential, but includes Bihoku Senior High School and Kōnan Police Station.

Work to elevate the station, in order to abolish five level crossings (including one at Japan National Route 155) and eliminate an 85 km/h speed limit north of the station, began in October 2009. A temporary station building, featuring Meitetsu's first full-color LED departure board, came into use on 6 February 2010. Tracks 1 and 2 moved to a temporary platform on 27 October 2012, followed by tracks 3 and 4 on 27 October 2013. Tracks 3 and 4 were elevated on 10 June 2017, and tracks 1 and 2 followed during fiscal 2019.

=== Former station building (until February 2010) ===
The former station building was significant, as it dated from the opening of the line at the very beginning of the Taishō period. It was built in the giyōfū style, with its western-style porte-cochère (decorated with the emblem of the Nagoya Electric Railway) contrasting with Japanese-style tile-roofing. The platform roofs were built using old rails (as they were at the old Chiryū Station), some of which included the inscription 'CARNEGIE 1897'. There were formerly several similar station buildings on the line, but rebuilding work elsewhere left Hotei as the last surviving example. Therefore, when it faced demolition as part of the elevation works, local residents were keen to ensure that it was at least partially preserved. On 27 May 2010, Meitetsu and the City of Kōnan reached a basic agreement, in which Meitetsu would hand over parts of the old station building and its fixtures, such as the porte-cochère and the decorated ceiling, to the city; these were removed from the station in September that year.

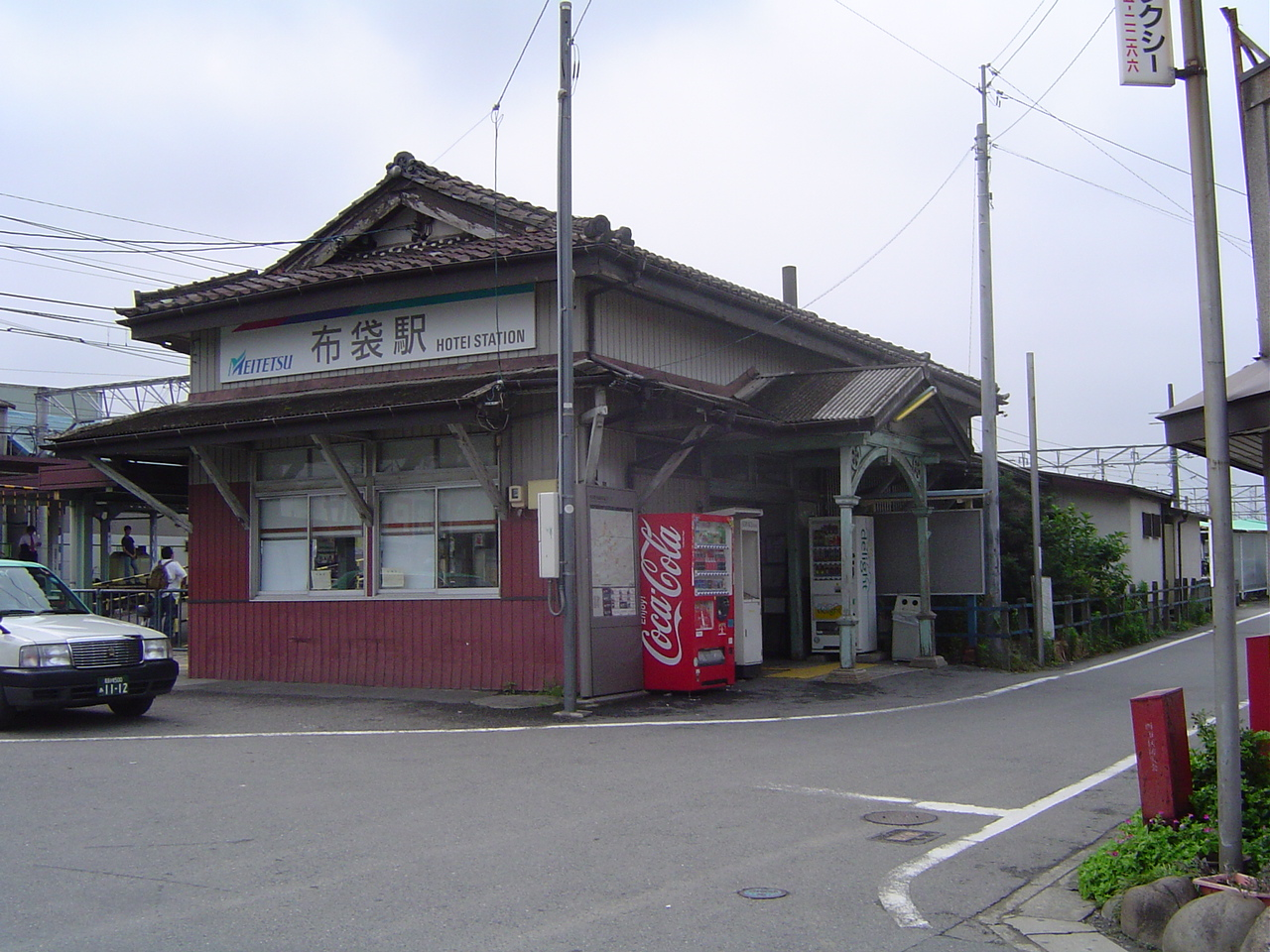
old station building

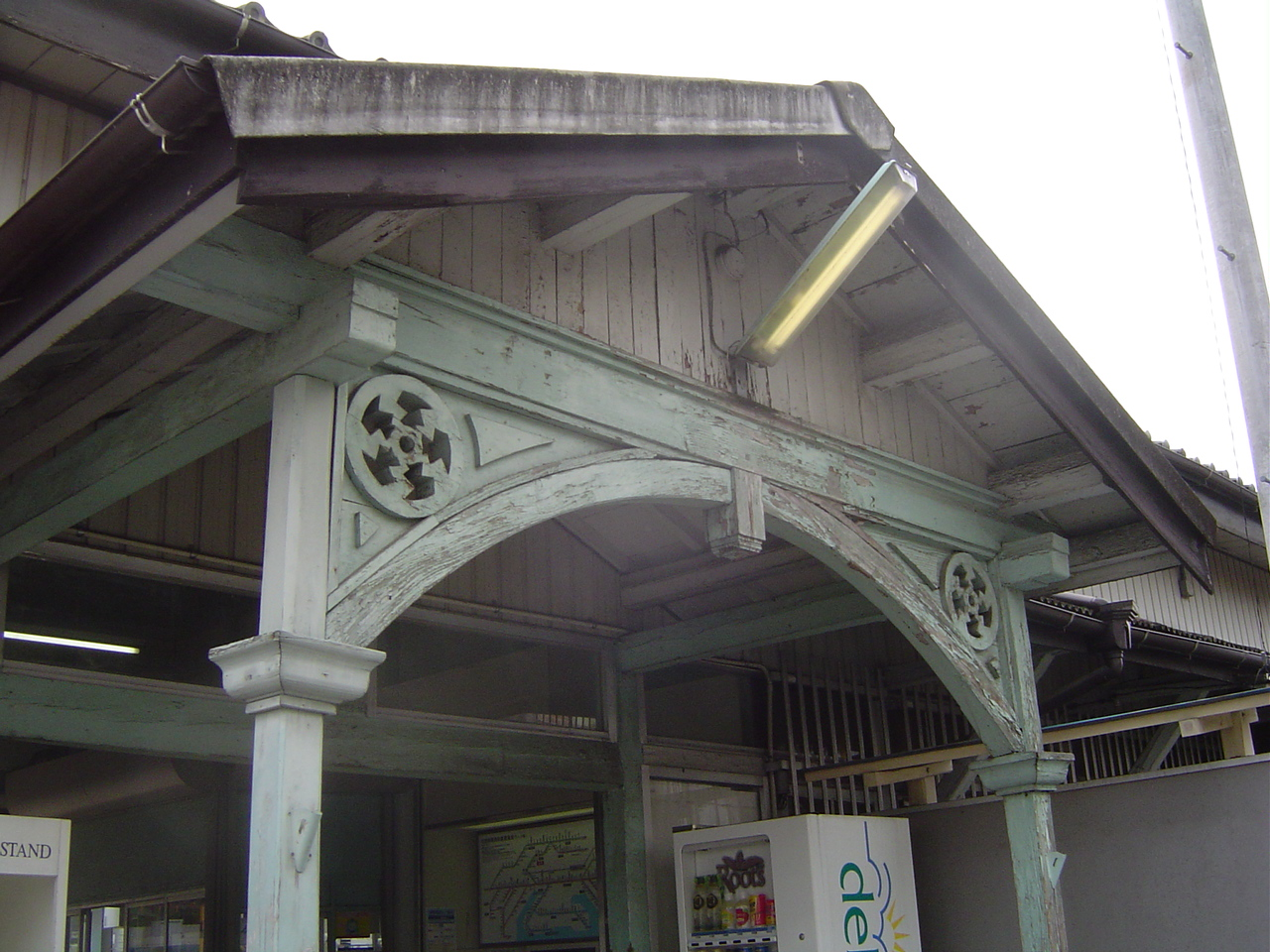
porte-cochère

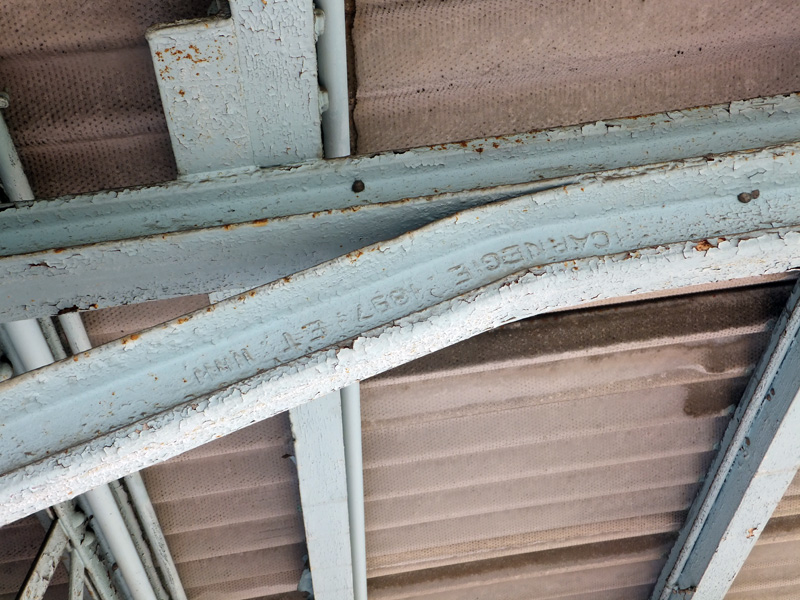
Carnigie 1897

== Passenger statistics ==
In fiscal 2015, the station was used by an average of 8911 passengers daily.

== Surrounding area ==
- Kōnan Daibutsu

== See also ==
- List of railway stations in Japan
