= Tokushige-Nagoya-Geidai Station =

Railway station in Kitanagoya, Aichi Prefecture, Japan

Tokushige-Nagoya-Geidai Station 徳重・名古屋芸大駅

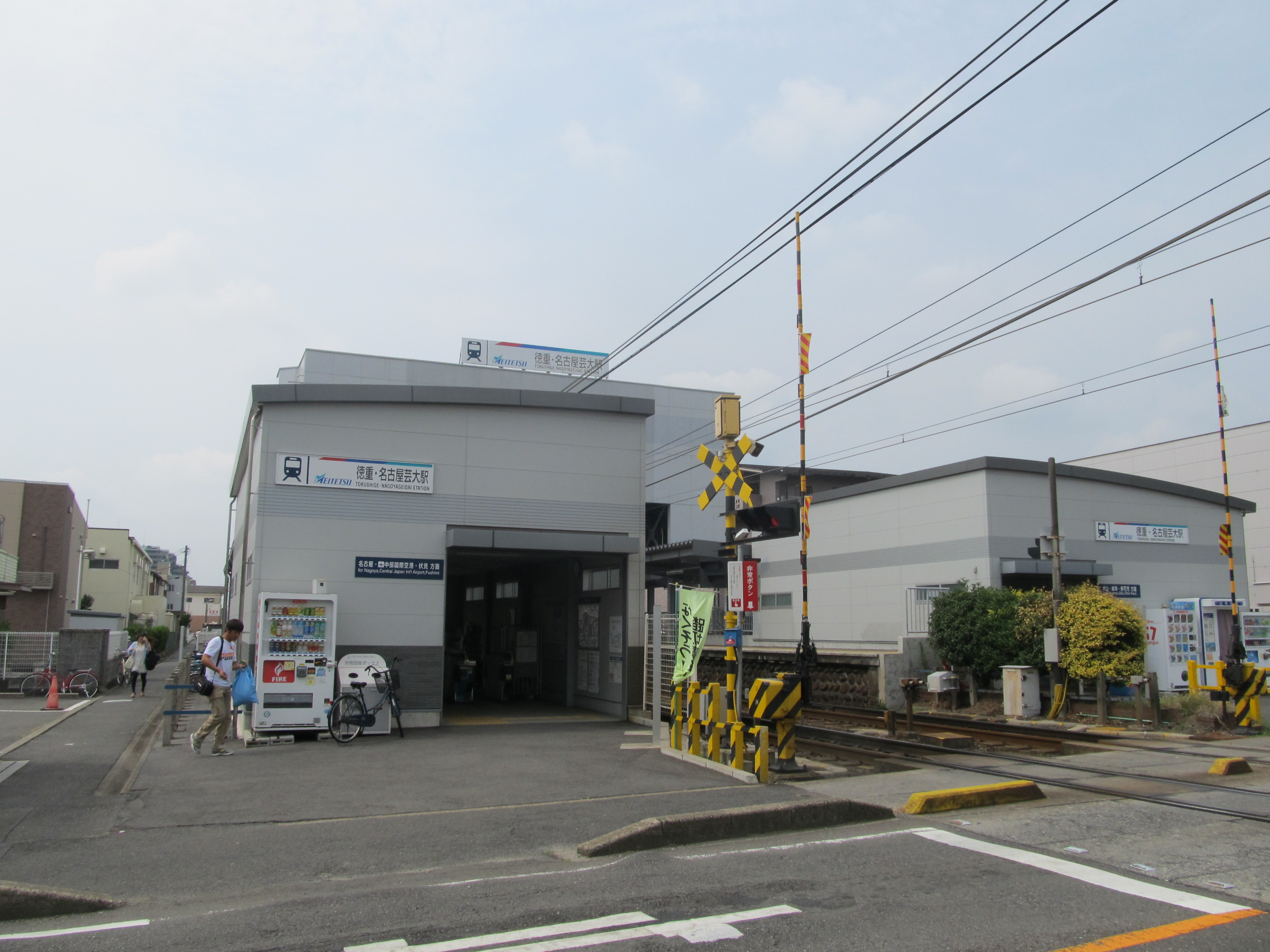
- Tokushige-Nagoya-Geidai Station

General information
- Location: Tokushige-Hirobatake 35, Kitanagoya-shi, Aichi-ken 481-0038; Japan
- Coordinates: 35.2562°N 136.8734°E
- Operator: Meitetsu
- Line: ■ Meitetsu Inuyama Line
- Distance: 7.3 kilometers from Biwajima
- Platforms: 2 side platforms

Other information
- Status: Staffed
- Station code: IY05
- Website: Official website

History
- Opened: August 6, 1912
- Former names: Tokushige (to 2005)

Passengers
- FY2013: 10,370

Services
Preceding station	Meitetsu	Following station
Nishiharu towards Shimo Otai	Inuyama Line Local	Taisanji towards Shin-Unuma
Location
- Location within Aichi Prefecture Location within Japan

Tokushige-Nagoya-Geidai Station (徳重・名古屋芸大駅, Tokushige-Nagoyageidai-eki) is a railway station in the city of Kitanagoya, Aichi Prefecture, Japan, operated by Meitetsu.

== Lines ==
Tokushige-Nagoya-Geidai Station is served by the Meitetsu Inuyama Line, and is located 7.3 kilometers from the starting point of the line at Biwajima.

== Station layout ==
The station has two opposed side platforms connected by a footbridge. The station has automated ticket machines, Manaca automated turnstiles and is staffed.

=== Platforms ===
1	■ Inuyama Line	For Iwakura and Inuyama
2	■ Inuyama Line	For Meitetsu-Nagoya and Fushimi

== Station history ==
Tokushige Nagoya Geidai Station was opened on August 6, 1912 as Tokushige Station (徳重駅, Tokushige-eki). The station was closed in 1944, but reopened on September 15, 1946. The station was an unattended station from 1946–1963. A new station building was completed in December 1980. The station was renamed to its present name on January 29, 2005.

== Passenger statistics ==
In fiscal 2013, the station was used by an average of 10,370 passengers daily.

== Surrounding area ==
- Nagoya University of Arts
- Nishiharu High School

== See also ==
- List of railway stations in Japan
