= Taisanji Station =

Railway station in Iwakura, Aichi Prefecture, Japan

Taisanji Station 大山寺駅

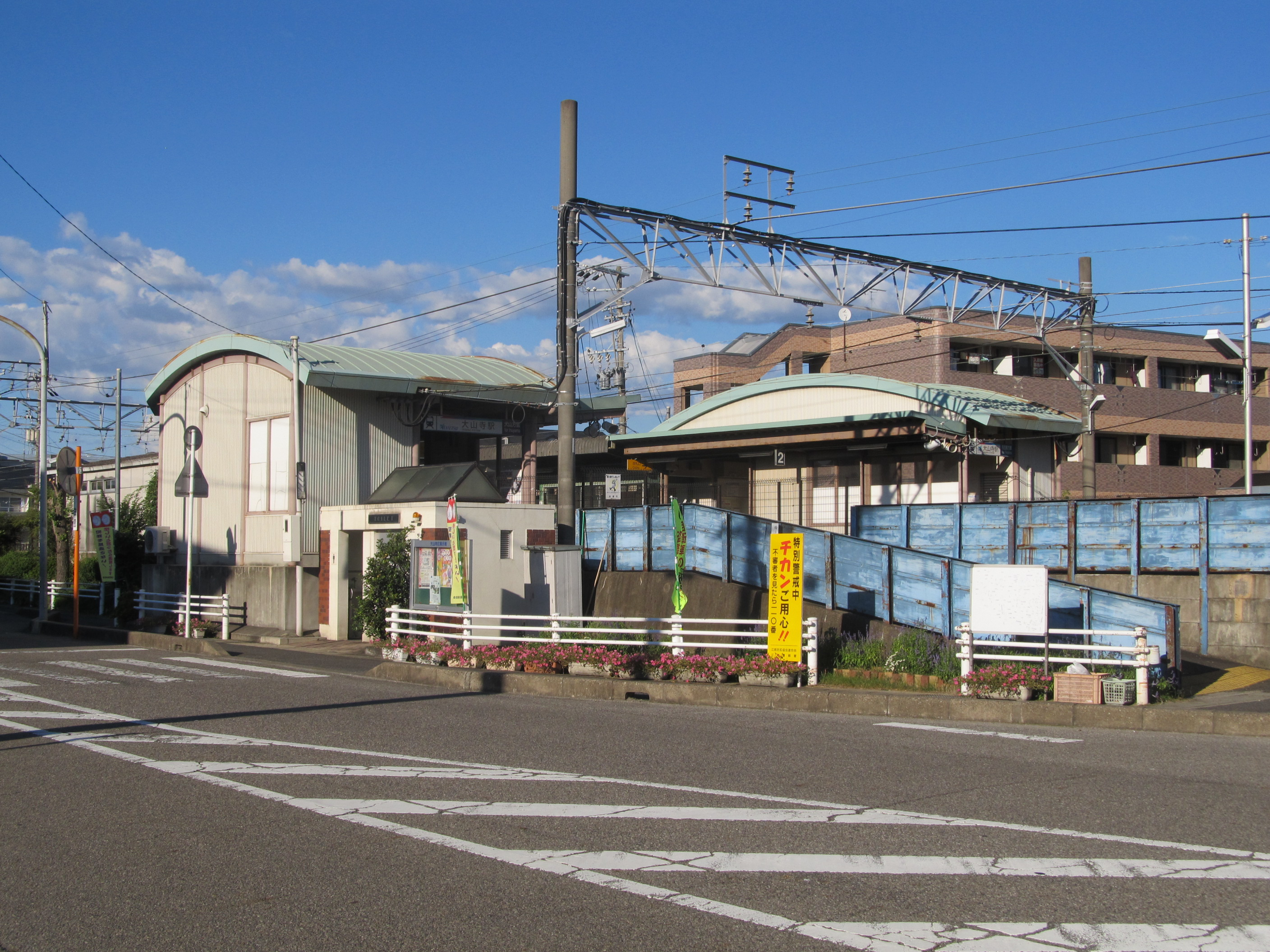
- Taisanji Station in September 2014

General information
- Location: Taisanji-chō Higashide 993-1, Iwakura-shi, Aichi-ken 482-0014; Japan
- Coordinates: 35.2633°N 136.8748°E
- Operator: Meitetsu
- Line: ■ Meitetsu Inuyama Line
- Distance: 8.1 kilometers from Biwajima
- Platforms: 2 side platforms

Other information
- Status: Unstaffed
- Station code: IY06
- Website: Official website

History
- Opened: February 5, 1915

Passengers
- FY2017: 2091

Services
Preceding station	Meitetsu	Following station
Tokushige-Nagoya-Geidai towards Shimo Otai	Inuyama Line Local	Iwakura towards Shin-Unuma
Location
- Location within Aichi Prefecture Location within Japan

Taisanji Station (大山寺駅, Taisanji-eki) is a railway station in the city of Iwakura, Aichi Prefecture, Japan, operated by Meitetsu.

== Lines ==
Taisanji Station is served by the Meitetsu Inuyama Line, and is located 8.1 kilometers from the starting point of the line at Biwajima.

== Station layout ==
The station has two opposed side platforms connected by a level crossing. The station has automated ticket machines, Manaca automated turnstiles and is unattended.

=== Platforms ===
1	■ Inuyama Line	For Iwakura and Inuyama
2	■ Inuyama Line	For Meitetsu-Nagoya and Fushimi

== Station history ==
Taisanji Station was opened on February 5, 1915. It has been unattended since March 1952. The station building was rebuilt in January 2004.

== Passenger statistics ==
In fiscal 2017, the station was used by an average of 2091 passengers daily.

== Surrounding area ==
- Sono Elementary School
- Sono housing area

== See also ==
- List of railway stations in Japan
