= Kashiwamori Station =

Railway station in Fusō, Aichi Prefecture, Japan

Kashiwamori Station 柏森駅

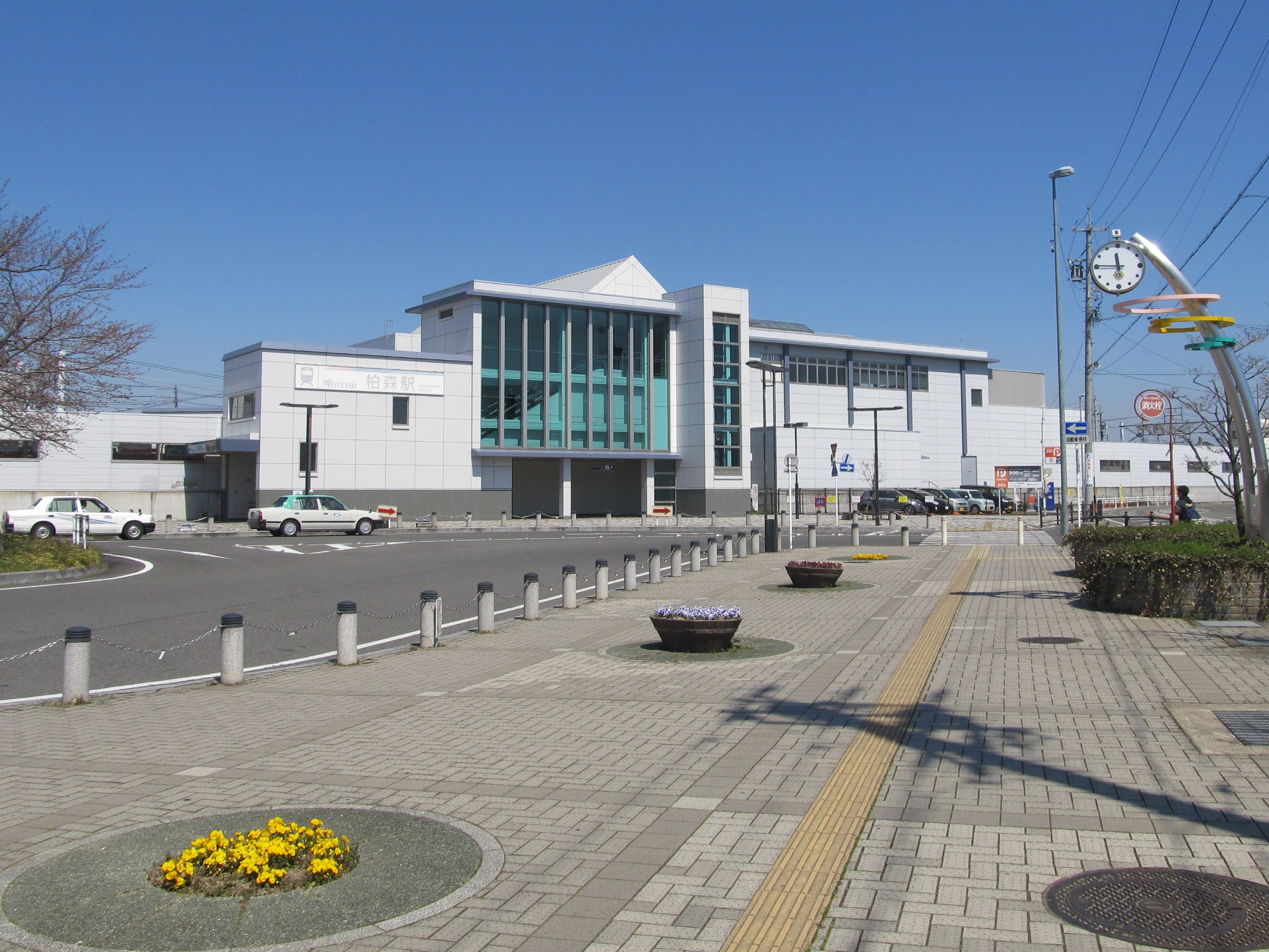
- Kashiwamori Station

General information
- Location: Tenjin-1-1 Kashiwamori, Fuso-machi, Niwa-gun, Aichi-ken 480-0103; Japan
- Coordinates: 35.3446°N 136.9000°E
- Operator: Meitetsu
- Line: ■ Meitetsu Inuyama Line
- Distance: 19.0 kilometers from Biwajima
- Platforms: 1 island + 1 side platform

Other information
- Status: Unstaffed
- Station code: IY11
- Website: Official website

History
- Opened: August 6, 1912

Passengers
- FY2013: 10,337

Services
Preceding station	Meitetsu	Following station
Kōnan One-way operation	μSky (last train for Shin-Unuma, weekday nights)	Inuyama towards Shin-Unuma
Kōnan towards Shimo Otai	Inuyama Line Rapid Limited Express Limited Express	Inuyama towards Shin-Unuma
Kōnan towards Shimo Otai	Inuyama Line Rapid Express Express Semi Express Local	Fusō towards Shin-Unuma
Location
- Location within Aichi Prefecture Location within Japan

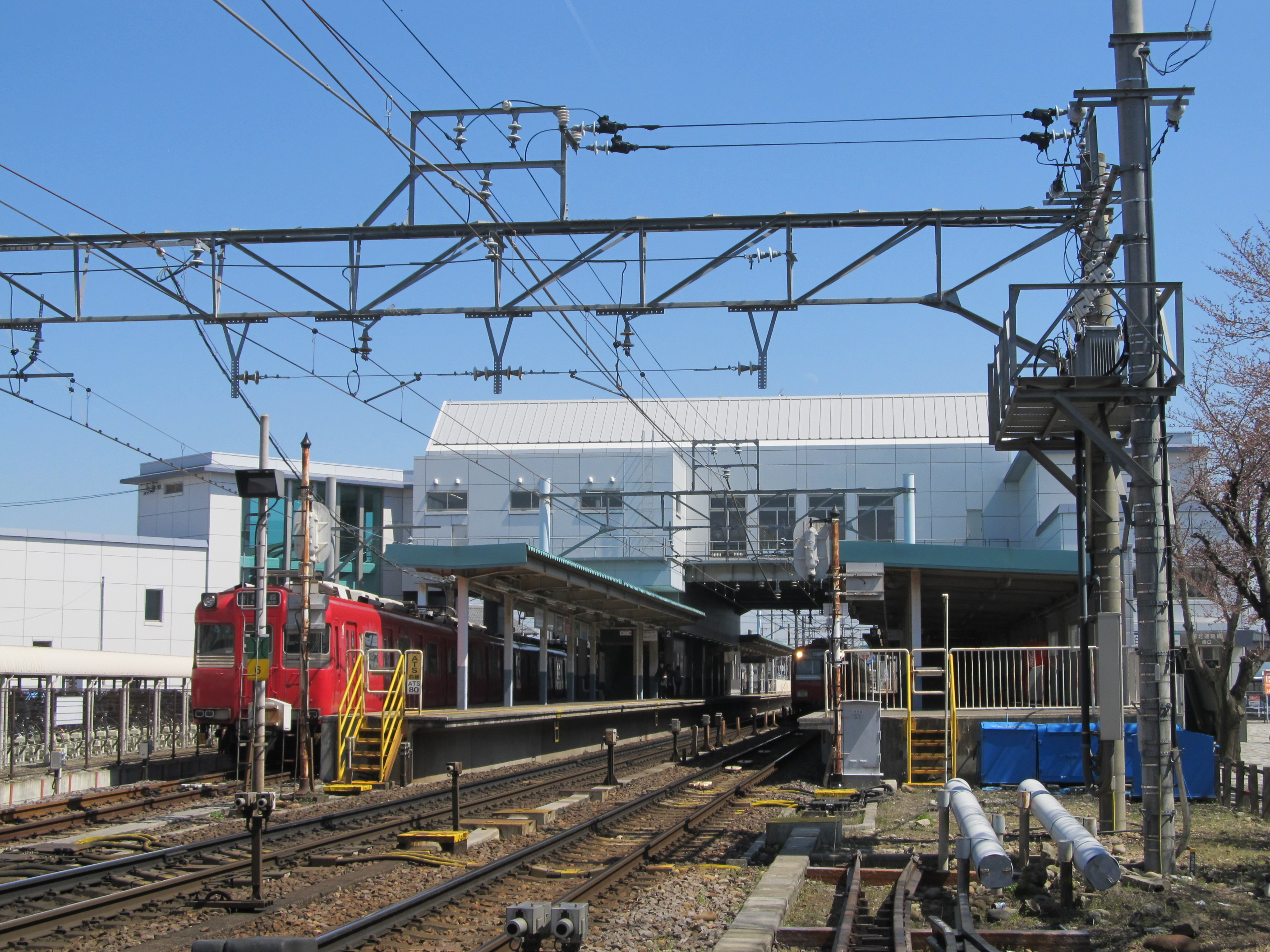
Platforms

Kashiwamori Station (柏森駅, Kashiwamori-eki) is a railway station in the town of Fusō, Aichi Prefecture, Japan, operated by Meitetsu.

== Lines ==
Kashiwamori Station is served by the Meitetsu Inuyama Line, and is located 19.0 kilometers from the starting point of the line at Biwajima.

== Station layout ==
The station has one island platform and one side platform connected by an elevated station building which is constructed over the tracks and platform. The station is staffed.

=== Platforms ===
1	■ Inuyama Line	for Nagoya and Kanayama (starting trains)
2	■ Inuyama Line	for Inuyama and Meitetsu Gifu
3	■ Inuyama Line	for Nagoya and Kanayama

== Station history ==
Kashiwamori Station was opened on August 6, 1912. A new station building was completed in February 2007.

== Surrounding area ==
- Kashiwamori Jinja

== See also ==
- List of railway stations in Japan
