= Fusō Station =

Railway station in Fusō, Aichi Prefecture, Japan

Fusō Station 扶桑駅

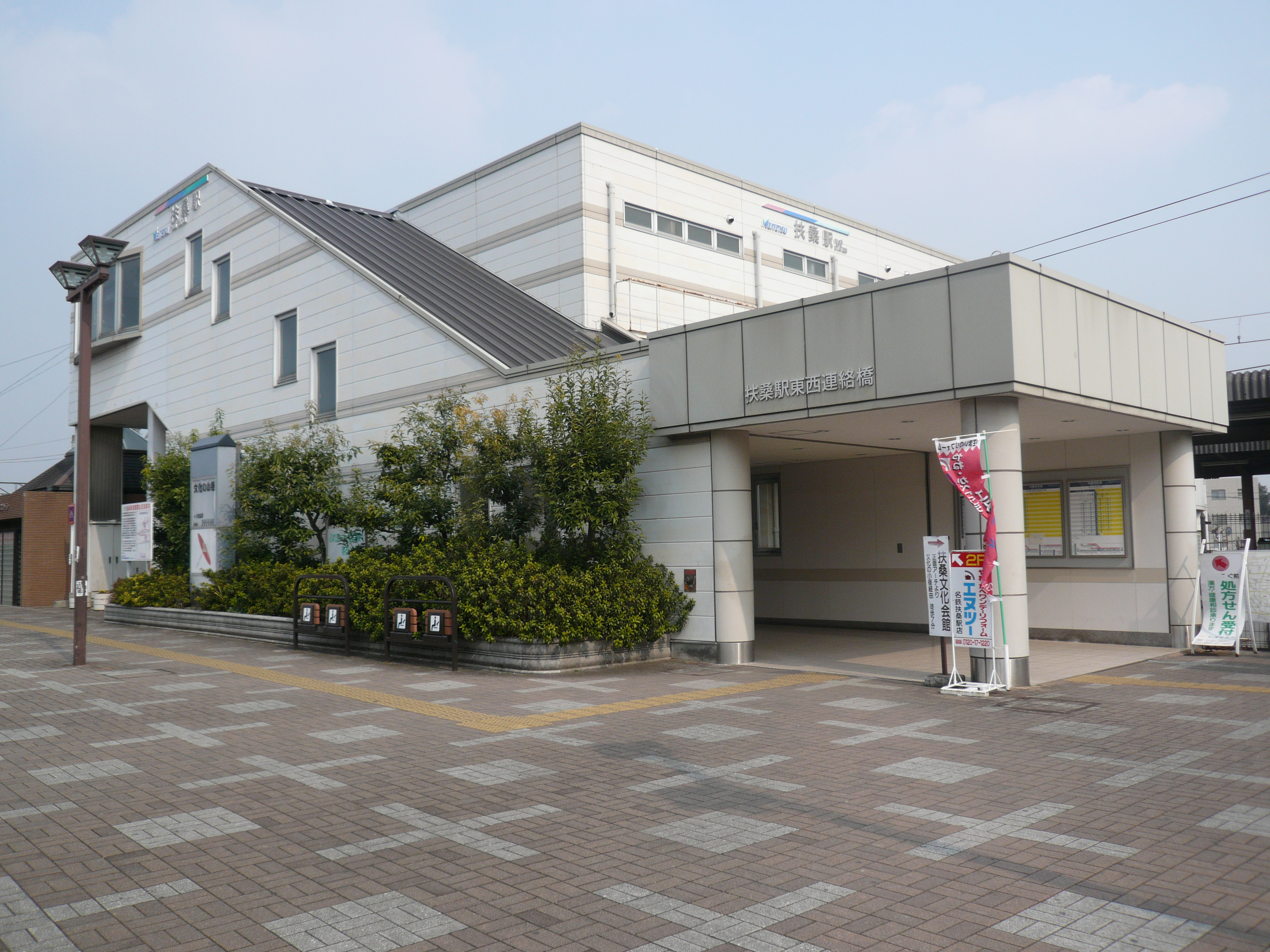
- Fusō Station building, March 2008

General information
- Location: Shimoyama-91 Takao, Fusō-machi, Niwa-gun, Aichi-ken 480-0102; Japan
- Coordinates: 35.3600°N 136.9156°E
- Operator: Meitetsu
- Line: ■ Meitetsu Inuyama Line
- Distance: 21.2 kilometers from Biwajima
- Platforms: 2 island platforms

Other information
- Status: Staffed
- Station code: IY12
- Website: Official website

History
- Opened: August 6, 1912
- Former names: Takao (to 1912), Shimono (to 1948)

Passengers
- FY2013: 6285

Services
Preceding station	Meitetsu	Following station
Kashiwamori towards Shimo Otai	Inuyama Line Rapid Express Express	Inuyama towards Shin-Unuma
Kashiwamori towards Shimo Otai	Inuyama Line Semi-Express Local	Kotsuyōsui towards Shin-Unuma
Location
- Location within Aichi Prefecture Location within Japan

track layout

Fusō Station (扶桑駅, Fusō-eki) is a railway station in the town of Fusō, Aichi Prefecture, Japan, operated by Meitetsu.

== Lines ==
Fusō Station is served by the Meitetsu Inuyama Line, and is located 21.2 kilometers from the starting point of the line at Biwajima.

== Station layout ==
The station has two island platforms connected by an elevated station building built over the tracks and platforms. The station is staffed.

=== Platforms ===
1, 2	■ Inuyama Line	for Inuyama, Shin-Unuma, Meitetsu-Gifu, and Shin Kani
3, 4	■ Inuyama Line	for Meitetsu-Nagoya, Toyohashi, and Central Japan International Airport

== Station history ==
Fusō Station was opened on August 6, 1912, as Takao Station (高雄駅, Takao-eki), and changed its name less than a year later on March 27, 1913, to Shimono Station (下野駅, Shimono-eki). The station name was changed to its present name on February 1, 1948. A new station building was completed in February 1994, and its platforms were reorganized into their present configuration.

== Surrounding area ==
- Fusō Town Hall

== See also ==
- List of railway stations in Japan
