= Naka-Otai Station =

Railway station in Nagoya, Japan

Coordinates: 35.2146°N 136.8765°E

Naka-Otai Station 中小田井駅
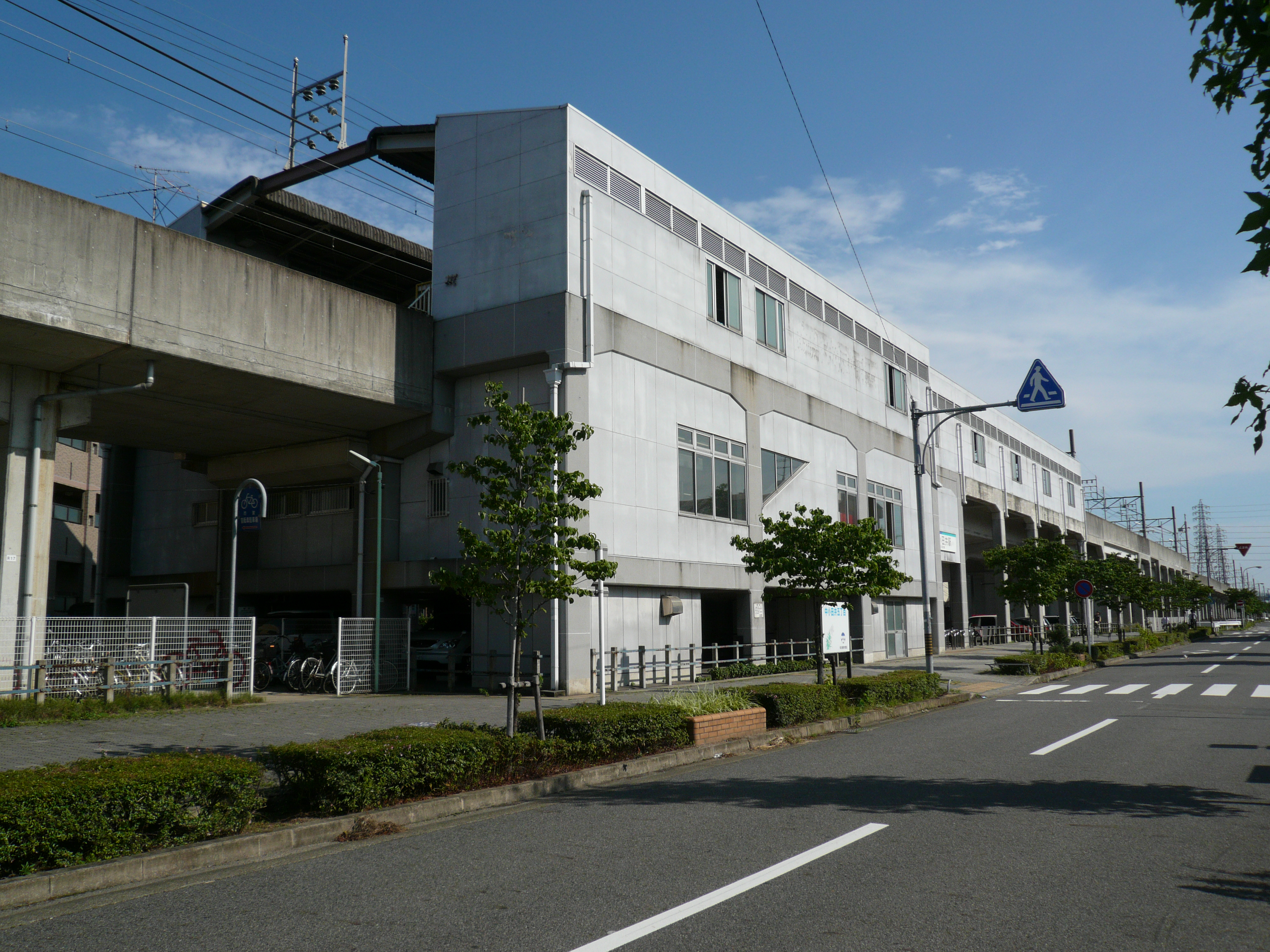
- Naka-Otai Station, July 2007

General information
- Location: Nishi, Nagoya, Aichi; Japan
- Operator: Nagoya Railroad
- Line: Inuyama Line

History
- Opened: August 6, 1912

Services
Preceding station	Meitetsu	Following station
Shimo Otai Terminus	Inuyama Line Express Local	Kami-Otai towards Shin-Unuma
Location

Naka-Otai Station (中小田井駅, Naka-Otai-eki) is a train station in Nishi-ku, Nagoya, Aichi Prefecture, Japan.

== Lines ==
- Nagoya Railroad
  - Inuyama Line

== Layout ==
=== Platforms ===
1	■ Inuyama Line	For Kami-Otai, Iwakura, Kōnan, and Inuyama
2	■ Inuyama Line	For Meitetsu-Nagoya, Higashi-Okazaki, and Ōtagawa
