= Nishiharu Station =

Railway station in Kitanagoya, Aichi Prefecture, Japan

Nishiharu Station 西春駅

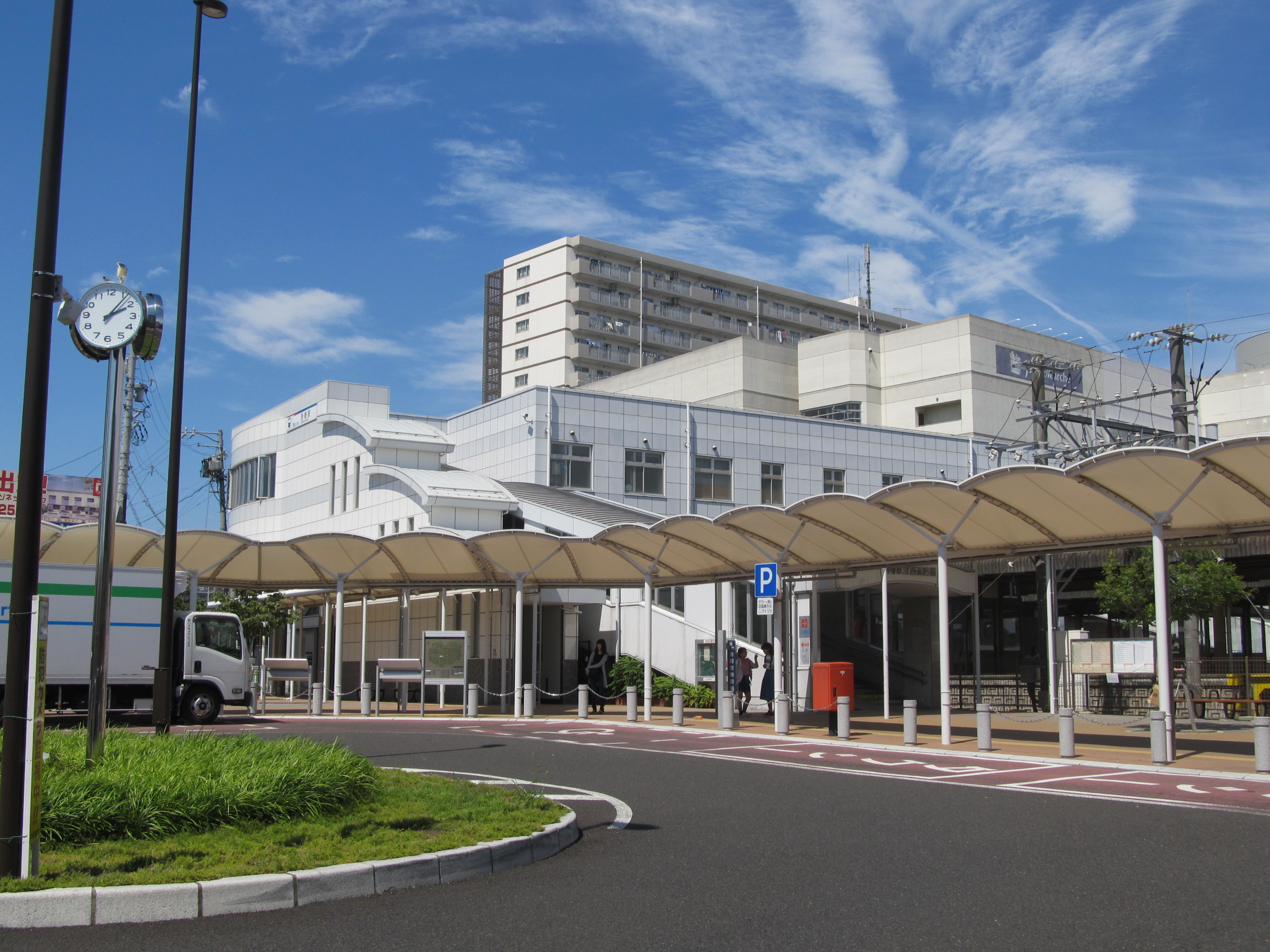
- West Exit of Nishiharu Station, June 2018

General information
- Location: Minamimachi-1 Kunotsubo, Kitanagoya-shi, Aichi-ken 481-0041; Japan
- Coordinates: 35.2450°N 136.8712°E
- Operator: Meitetsu
- Line: ■ Meitetsu Inuyama Line
- Distance: 5.9 kilometers from Biwajima
- Platforms: 2 island platforms

Other information
- Status: Unstaffed
- Station code: IY04
- Website: Official website

History
- Opened: August 6, 1912

Passengers
- FY2013: 22,288

Services
Preceding station	Meitetsu	Following station
Kami-Otai towards Shimo Otai	Inuyama Line Rapid Express Express Semi-Express	Iwakura towards Shin-Unuma
Kami-Otai towards Shimo Otai	Inuyama Line Local	Tokushige-Nagoya-Geidai towards Shin-Unuma
Location
- Location within Aichi Prefecture Location within Japan

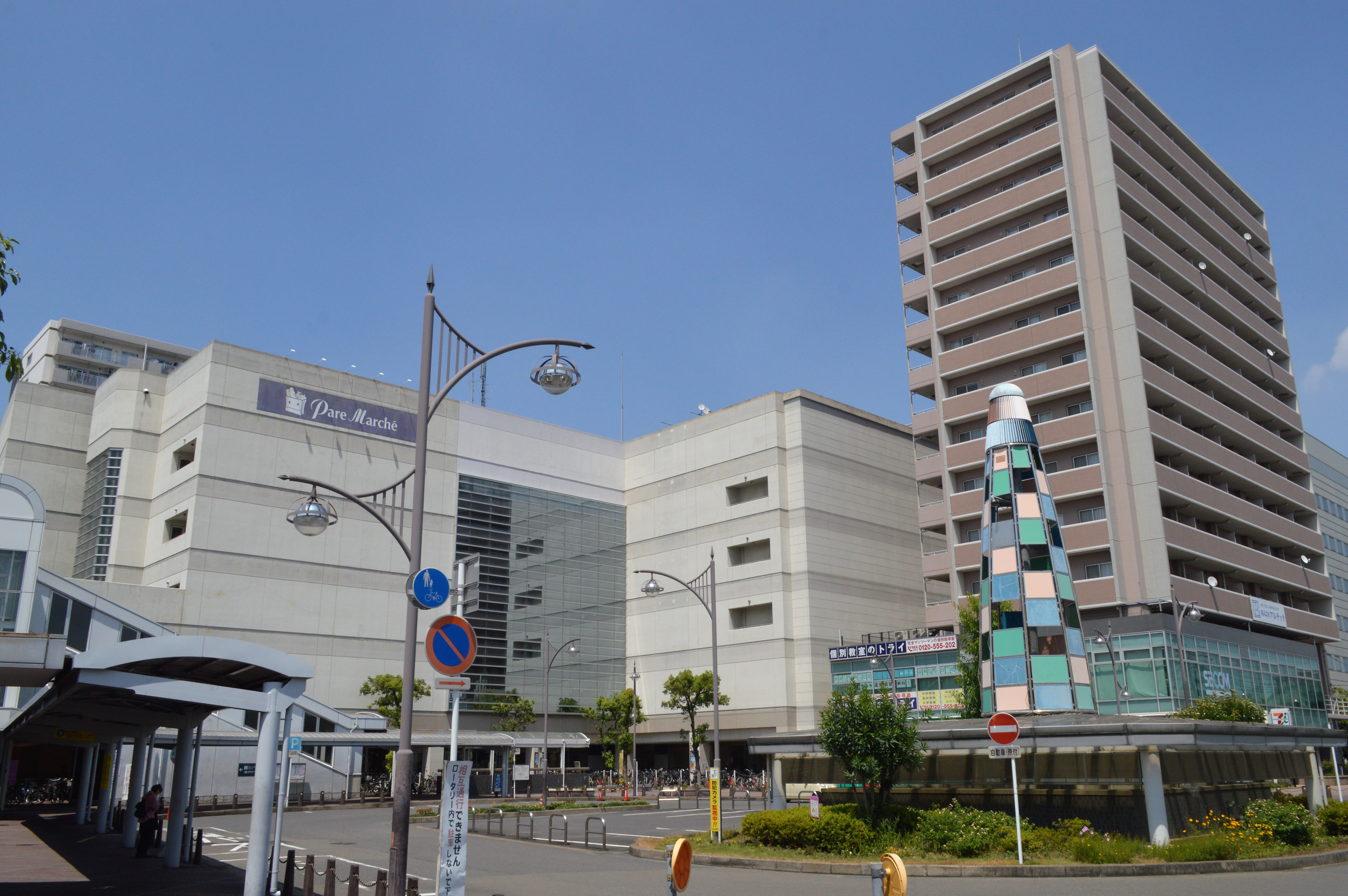
East Exit of Nishiharu Station

Nishiharu Station (西春駅, Nishiharu-eki) is a railway station in the city of Kitanagoya, Aichi Prefecture, Japan, operated by Meitetsu.

== Lines ==
Nishiharu Station is served by the Meitetsu Inuyama Line, and is located 5.9 kilometers from the starting point of the line at Biwajima.

== Station layout ==
The station has two island platforms with the elevated station building above and at a right angle to the tracks and platform. The station has automated ticket machines, Manaca automated turnstiles and is unattended.

=== Platforms ===
1, 2	■ Inuyama Line	For Iwakura and Inuyama
3, 4	■ Inuyama Line	For Meitetsu-Nagoya and Fushimi

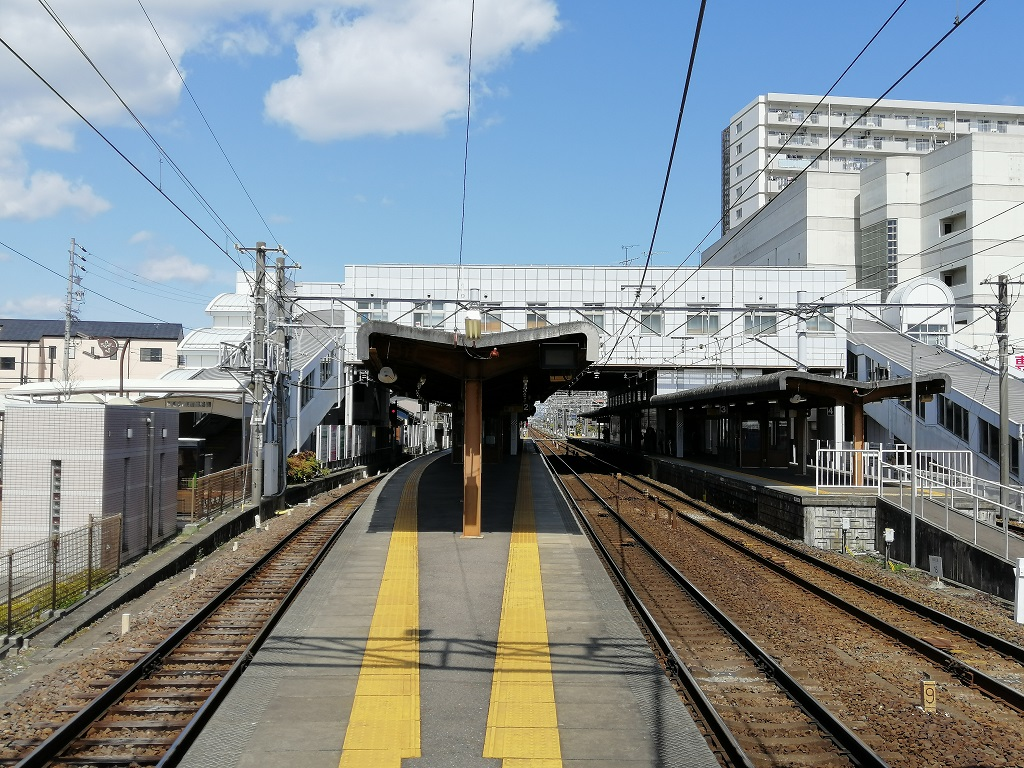
Platforms

== Station history ==
Nishiharu Station was opened on August 6, 1912. The station was reconstructed in March 1993 from dual opposed side platforms to its current configuration, and a new station building was completed.

== Passenger statistics ==
In fiscal 2013, the station was used by an average of 22,288 passengers daily.

== Surrounding area ==
- PareMarche Nishiharu
- ruins of Kunotsubo Castle

== See also ==
- List of railway stations in Japan
