= Inuyamaguchi Station =

Railway station in Inuyama, Aichi Prefecture, Japan

Inuyamaguchi Station 犬山口駅

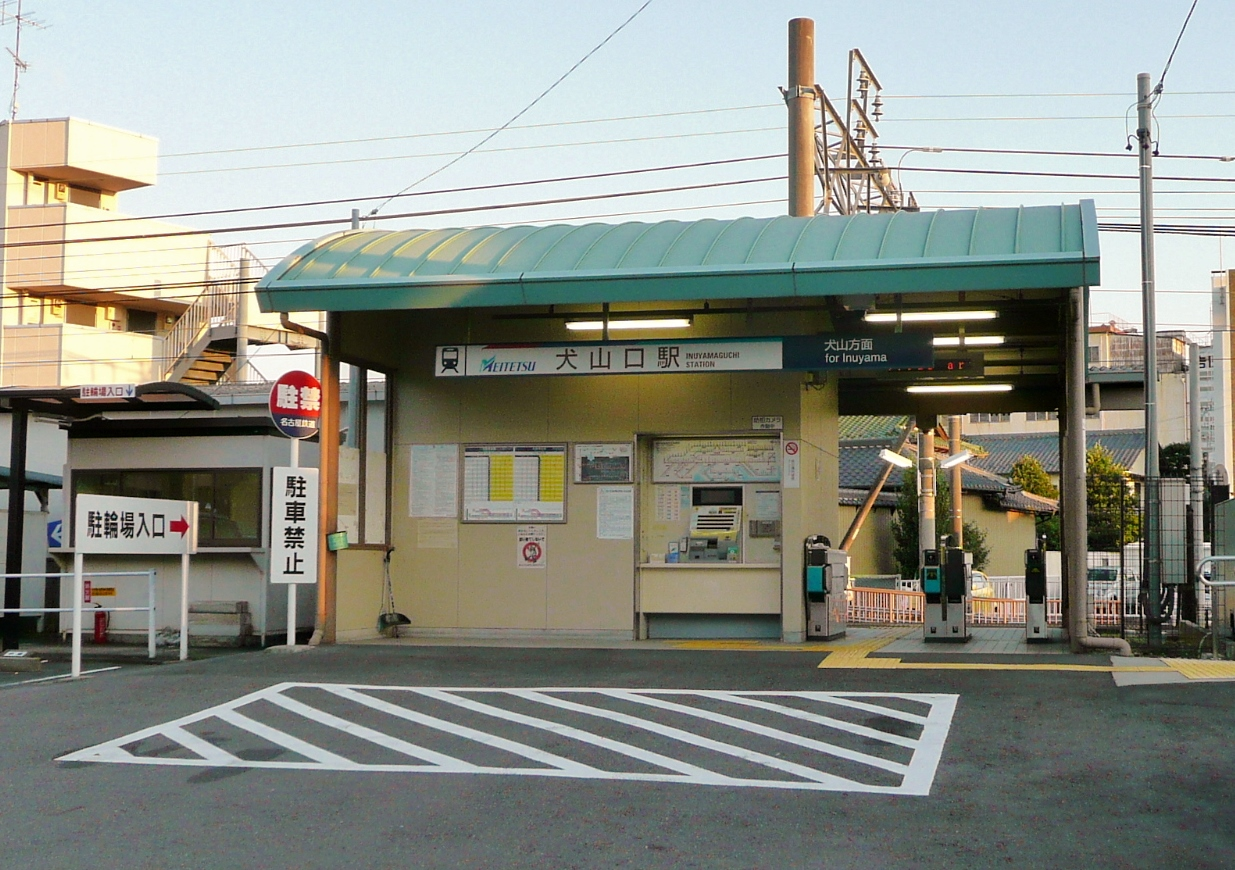
- Inuyamaguchi Station entrance, September 2008

General information
- Location: Suetomo-21 Inuyama-shi, Aichi-ken 484-0081; Japan
- Coordinates: 35.3744°N 136.9399°E
- Operator: Meitetsu
- Line: ■ Meitetsu Inuyama Line
- Distance: 24.0 kilometers from Biwajima
- Platforms: 2 side platforms

Other information
- Status: Unstaffed
- Station code: IY14
- Website: Official website

History
- Opened: August 6, 1912

Passengers
- FY2015: 1593

Services
Preceding station	Meitetsu	Following station
Kotsuyōsui towards Shimo Otai	Inuyama Line Semi-Express Local	Inuyama towards Shin-Unuma
Location
- Location within Aichi Prefecture Location within Japan

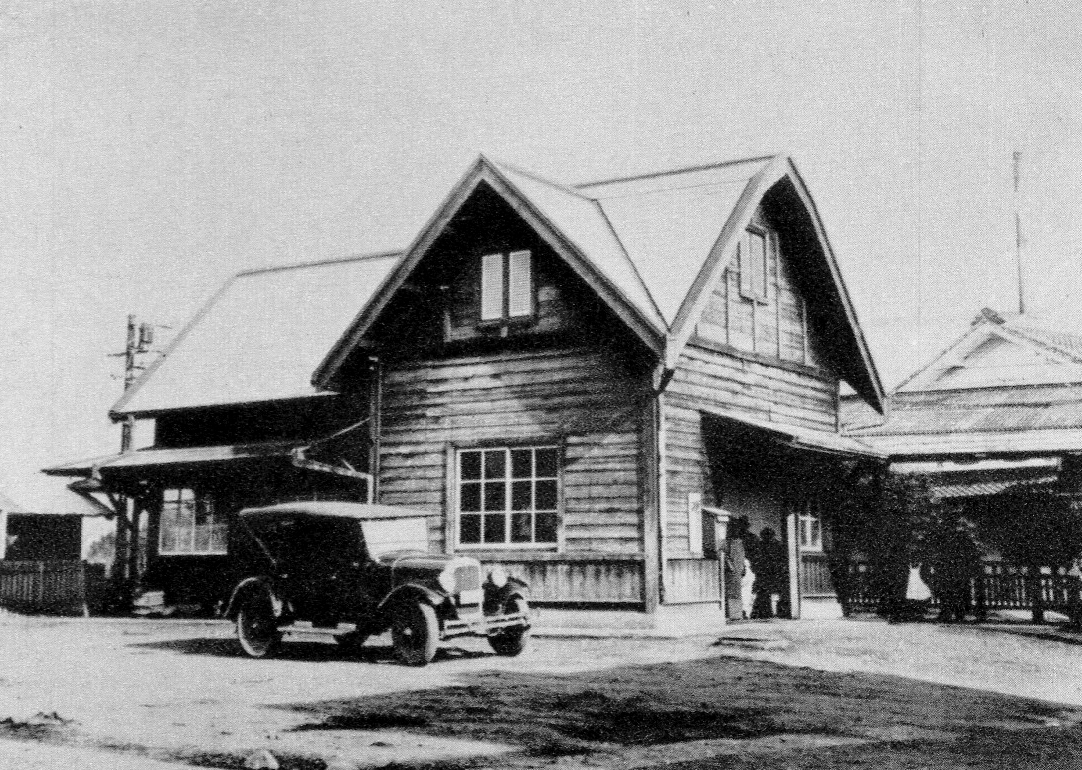
Inuyamaguchi Station in 1930

Inuyamaguchi Station (犬山口駅, Inuyamaguchi-eki) is a railway station in the city of Inuyama, Aichi Prefecture, Japan, operated by Meitetsu.

== Lines ==
Inuyamaguchi Station is served by the Meitetsu Inuyama Line, and is located 24.0 kilometers from the starting point of the line at Biwajima.

== Station layout ==
The station has two opposed side platforms connected by a level crossing. The station has automated ticket machines, Manaca automated turnstiles and is unattended..

=== Platforms ===
1	■ Inuyama Line	For Inuyama and Meitetsu-Gifu
2	■ Inuyama Line	For Meitetsu-Nagoya and Kanayama

== Station history ==
Inuyamaguchi Station was opened on August 6, 1912.

== Passenger statistics ==
In fiscal 2015, the station was used by an average of 1593 passengers daily.

== Surrounding area ==
- Inuyama Minami Elementary School

== See also ==
- List of railway stations in Japan
