= Ishibotoke Station =

Railway station in Iwakura, Aichi Prefecture, Japan

Ishibotoke Station 石仏駅

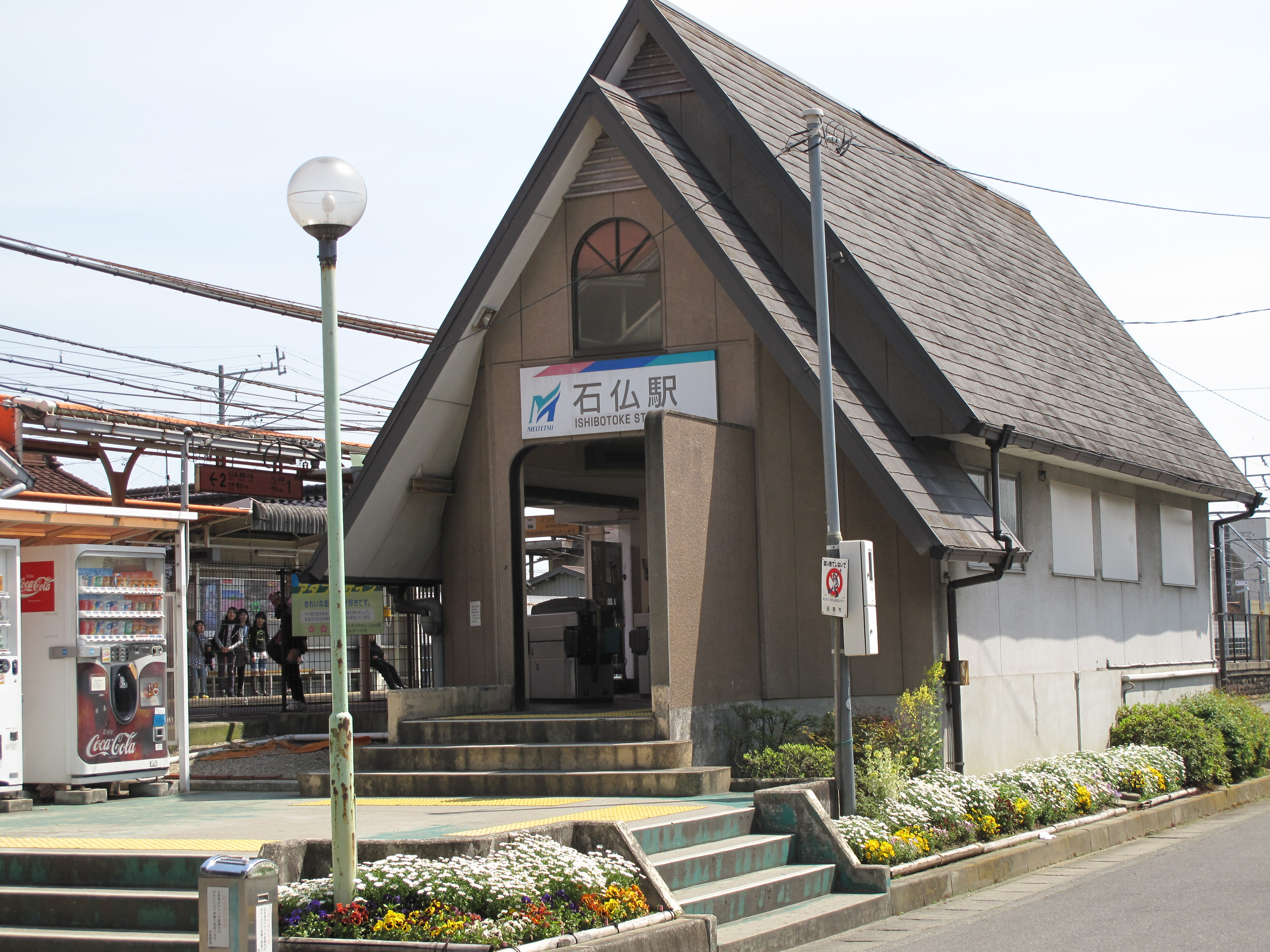
- Ishibotoke Station in April 2010

General information
- Location: Nakayashiki-662 Ishibotoke-chō, Iwakura-shi, Aichi-ken 482-003; Japan
- Coordinates: 35.2954°N 136.8714°E
- Operator: Meitetsu
- Line: ■ Meitetsu Inuyama Line
- Distance: 11.8 kilometers from Biwajima
- Platforms: 2 side platforms

Other information
- Status: Unstaffed
- Station code: IY08
- Website: Official website

History
- Opened: August 6, 1912

Passengers
- FY2017: 3890

Services
Preceding station	Meitetsu	Following station
Iwakura towards Shimo Otai	Inuyama Line Semi Express Local	Hotei towards Shin-Unuma
Location
- Location within Aichi Prefecture Location within Japan

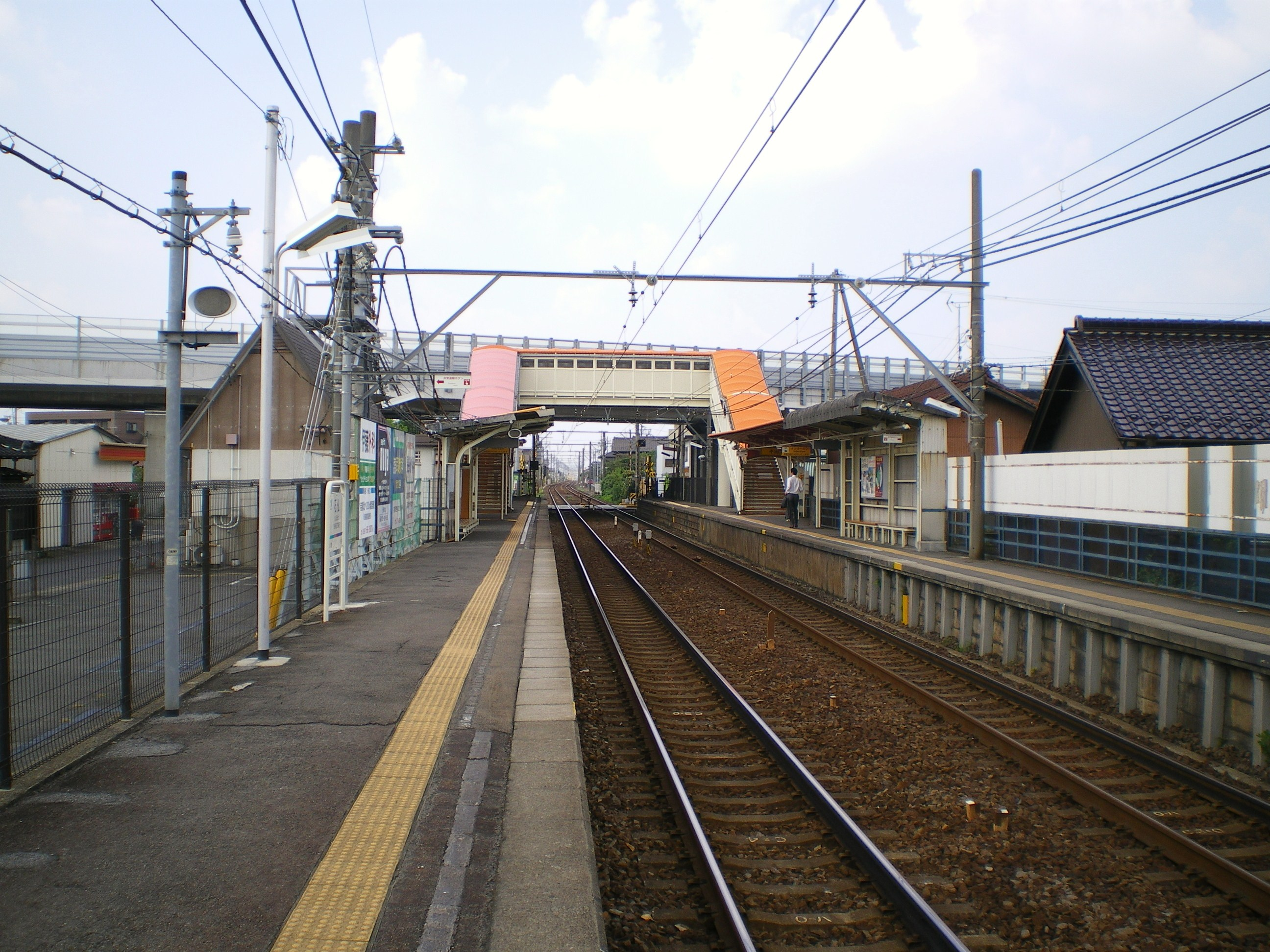
Platforms

Ishibotoke Station (石仏駅, Ishibotoke-eki) is a railway station in the city of Iwakura, Aichi Prefecture, Japan, operated by Meitetsu.

== Lines ==
Ishibotoke Station is served by the Meitetsu Inuyama Line, and is located 11.8 kilometers from the starting point of the line at Biwajima.

== Station layout ==
The station has two opposed side platforms connected by a footbridge. The station has automated ticket machines, Manaca automated turnstiles and is unattended.

=== Platforms ===
1	■ Inuyama Line	for Inuyama
2	■ Inuyama Line	for Meitetsu Nagoya and Kanayama

== Station history ==
Ishibotoke Station was opened on August 6, 1912. The station building was rebuilt in May 1982.

== Passenger statistics ==
In fiscal 2017, the station was used by an average of 3890 passengers daily.

== Surrounding area ==
- Ichinomiya Minami High School
- Ichinomiya Technical High School

== See also ==
- List of railway stations in Japan
