= Kōnan Station (Aichi) =

Railway station in Kōnan, Aichi Prefecture, Japan

Kōnan Station 江南駅

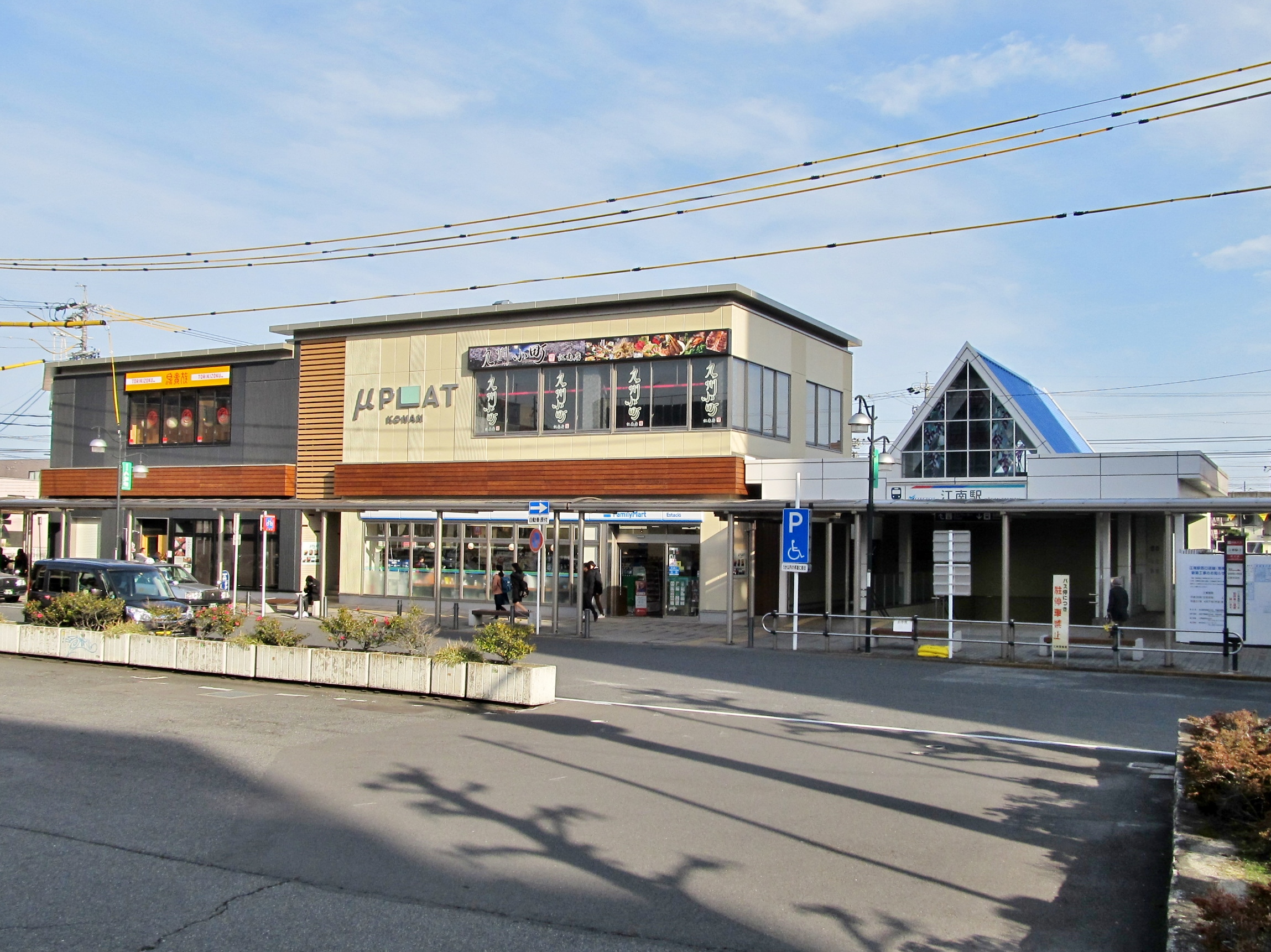
- Kōnan Station precincts, February 2019

General information
- Location: Kochino-chō Asahi 283, Kōnan-shi, Aichi-ken 483-8213; Japan
- Coordinates: 35.335°N 136.872°E
- Operator: Meitetsu
- Line: ■ Meitetsu Inuyama Line
- Distance: 16.2 kilometers from Biwajima
- Platforms: 1 island platform

Other information
- Status: Staffed
- Station code: IY10
- Website: Official website

History
- Opened: 6 August 1912

Passengers
- FY2017: 27,133

Services
Preceding station	Meitetsu	Following station
Iwakura towards Central Japan International Airport	μSky	Inuyama towards Shin-Unuma
Iwakura One-way operation	μSky (last train for Shin-Unuma, weekday nights)	Kashiwamori towards Shin-Unuma
Iwakura towards Shimo Otai	Inuyama Line Rapid Limited Express Limited Express	Kashiwamori towards Shin-Unuma
Hotei towards Shimo Otai	Inuyama Line Rapid Express Express Semi Express Local	Kashiwamori towards Shin-Unuma
Location
- Location within Aichi Prefecture Location within Japan

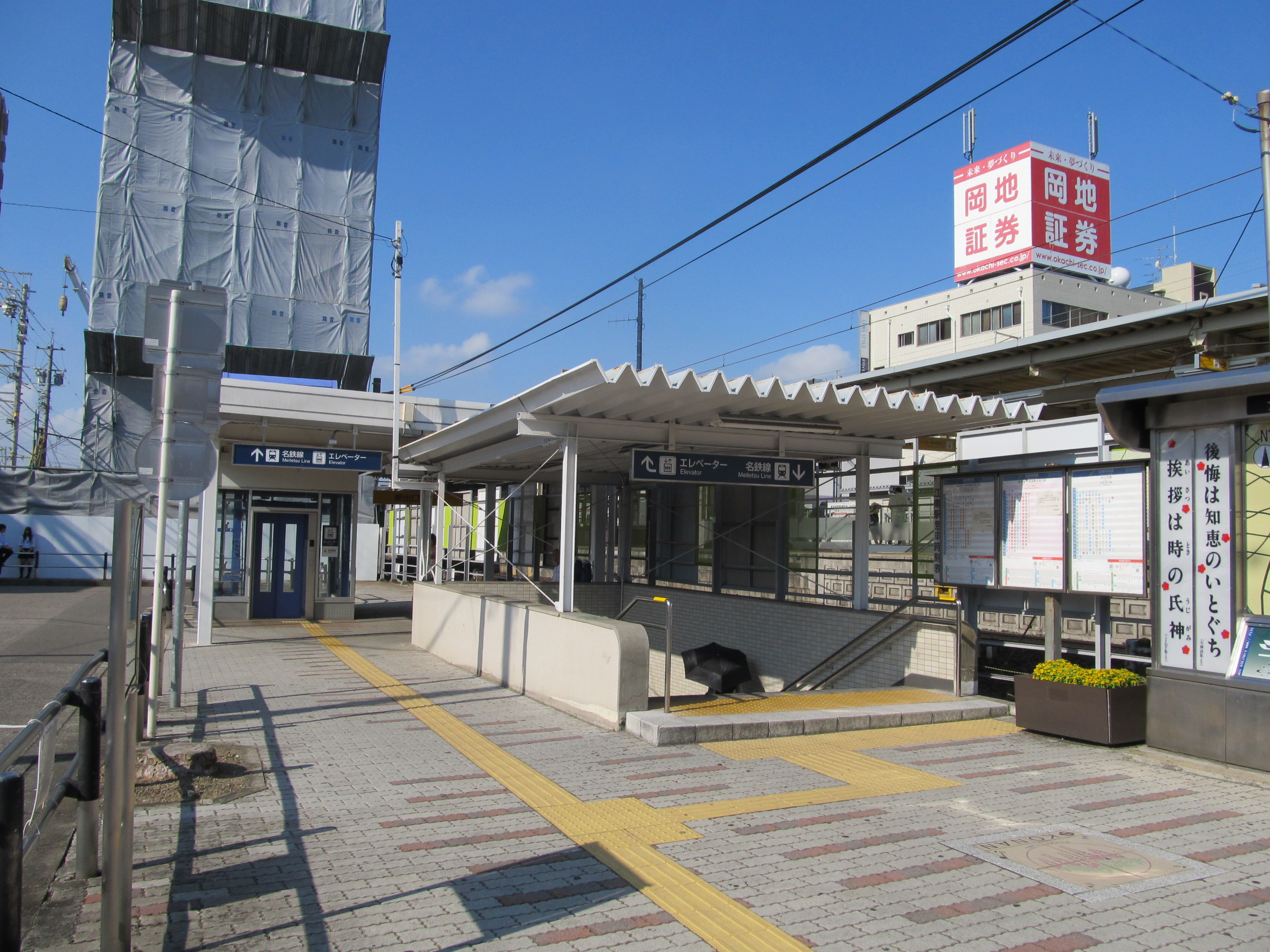
East exit

Kōnan Station (江南駅, Kōnan-eki) is a railway station in the city of Kōnan, Aichi Prefecture, Japan, operated by Meitetsu.

== Lines ==
Kōnan Station is served by the Meitetsu Inuyama Line, and is located 16.2 kilometers from the starting point of the line at Biwajima.

== Station layout ==
The station has a single island platforms connected to the station building by an underground passage. The station has automated ticket machines, Manaca automated turnstiles and is staffed..

=== Platforms ===
1	■ Inuyama Line	For Inuyama
2	■ Inuyama Line	For Meitetsu-Nagoya

== Station history ==
Kōnan Station was opened on 6 August 1912, as Kochino Station (古知野駅, Kochino-eki). The station was renamed to its present name on 10 September 1981.

== Passenger statistics ==
In fiscal 2015, the station was used by an average of 27,133 passengers daily.

== Surrounding area ==
- Kōnan City Hall

== See also ==
- List of railway stations in Japan
