= CA69 =

CA69 or CA-69 may refer to:

- USS Boston (CA-69), a World War II heavy cruiser
- California State Route 69, a former California highway now part of California State Route 245
- Biwajima Station, a railway station in Kiyosu, Aichi, Japan (station code CA69)
