= Iwakura, Aichi =

Iwakura 岩倉市
- City
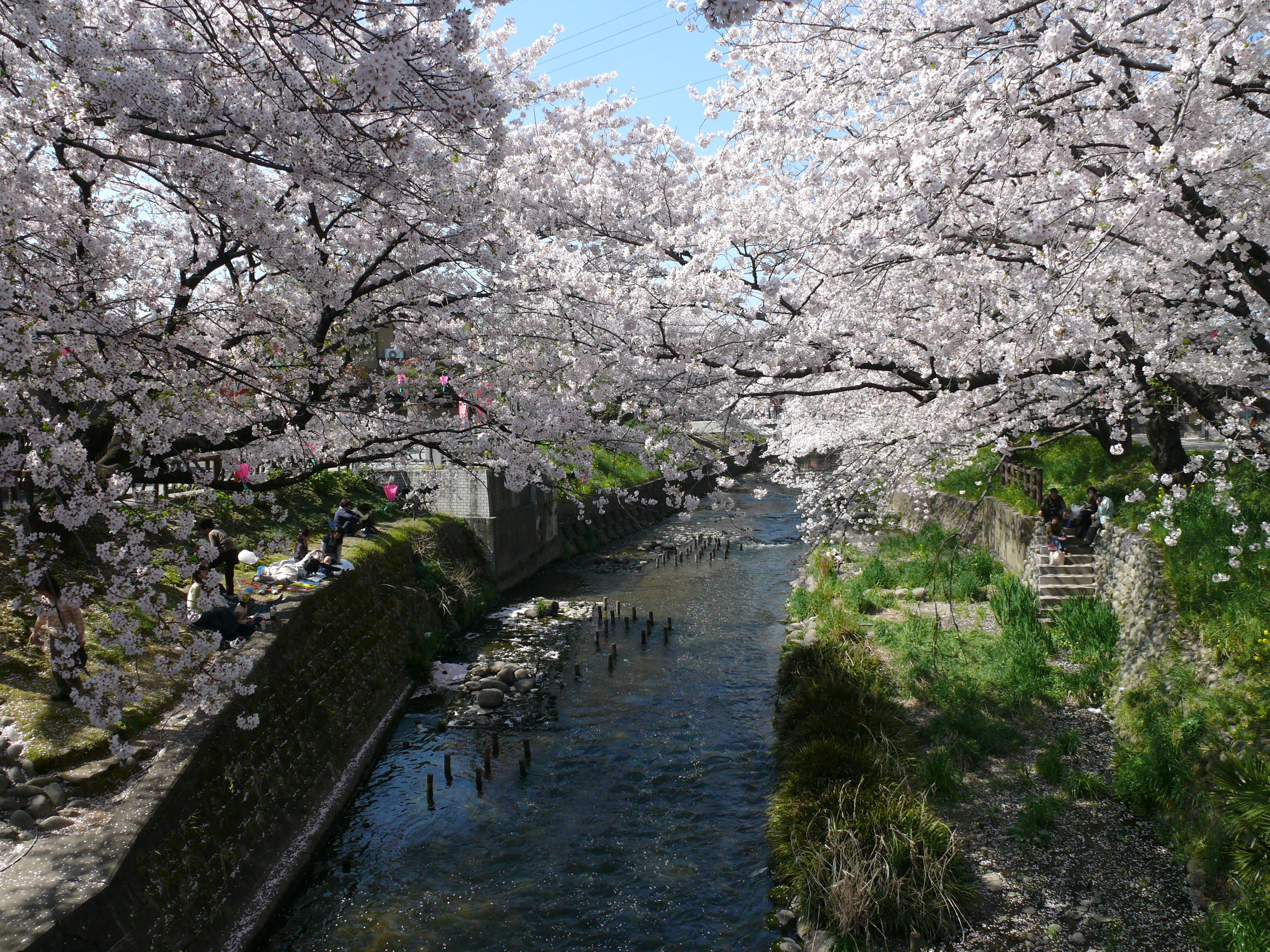
- Gojō-gawa river and cherry blossoms

- Flag Seal

- Location of Iwakura in Aichi Prefecture

- Coordinates: 35°16′46″N 136°52′17.1″E
- Country: Japan
- Region: Chūbu (Tōkai)
- Prefecture: Aichi

Government
  - Mayor: Katsurao Kubota (from January 2017)

Area
  - Total: 10.47 km^{2} (4.04 sq mi)

Population (October 1, 2019)
  - Total: 47,929
  - Density: 4,578/km^{2} (11,860/sq mi)
- Time zone: UTC+9 (Japan Standard Time)
- Tree: Camphor laurel
- Flower: Rhododendron
- Phone number: 0587-66-1111
- Address: 1-66 Sakae-cho, Iwakura-shi, Aichi-ken 482-8686
- Website: Official website

Iwakura (岩倉市, Iwakura-shi; Japanese pronunciation: [ì.β̞ä́.kɯ̈́.ɾä́(.ɕì)]) is a city located in Aichi Prefecture, Japan. As of 1 October 2019, the city had an estimated population of 47,929 in 21,805 households, and a population density of 4,578 persons per km^{2}. The total area of the city was 10.47 square kilometres (4.04 sq mi). It is the city with the smallest area in the prefecture (followed by Takahama and Chiryū), and is the 10th smallest city in Japan. Iwakura city is famous for its "Cherry Blossom Festival" which mostly takes place around the end of March every year. Iwakura's cherry blossom is located at the symbol of the city "Gojo river" and lists as one of the top 100 best cherry blossom spots in Japan.

== Geography ==
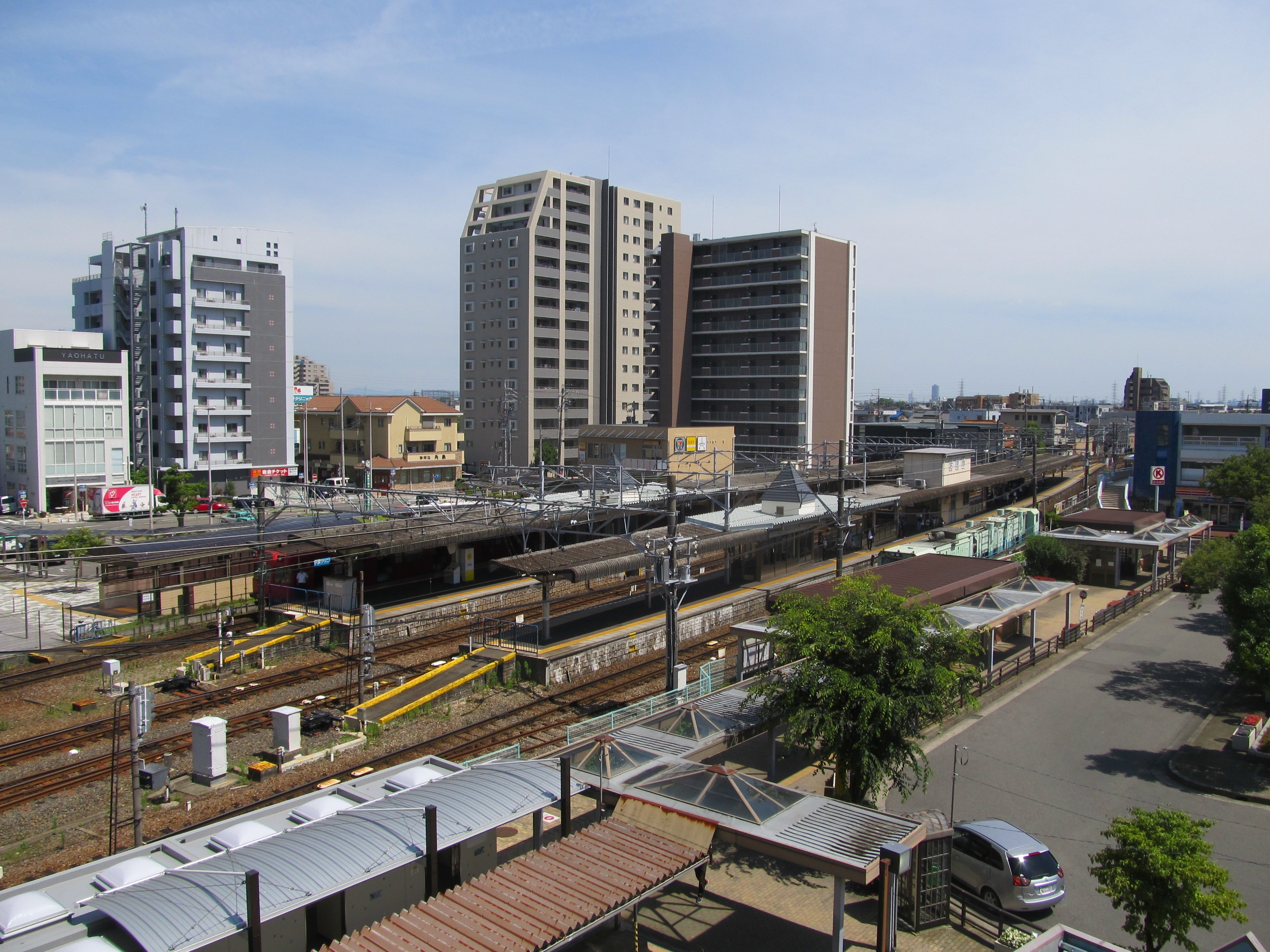
Downtown of Iwakura city

Iwakura is located in the Nōbi Plain region of northwest region of Aichi Prefecture, in the center of former Owari Province. The beautiful Gojō River flows through the city, which, despite its inland location, has an elevation of only eight to twelve meters above sea level.

=== Climate ===
The city has a climate characterized by hot and humid summers, and relatively mild winters (Köppen climate classification Cfa). The average annual temperature in Iwakura is 15.6 °C. The average annual rainfall is 1758 mm with September as the wettest month. The temperatures are highest on average in August, at around 28.2 °C, and lowest in January, at around 4.3 °C.

=== Demographics ===
Per Japanese census data, the population of Iwakura has been growing over the past 70 years.

Historical population
Year	Pop.	±%
1940	9,521	—
1950	13,029	+36.8%
1960	14,431	+10.8%
1970	38,843	+169.2%
1980	42,800	+10.2%
1990	43,807	+2.4%
2000	46,906	+7.1%
2010	47,329	+0.9%

=== Surrounding municipalities ===
Aichi Prefecture

- Ichinomiya
- Kitanagoya
- Komaki
- Kōnan

== History ==
=== Origins and feudal period ===
The area of modern Iwakura was settled in the Jōmon period and Yayoi period and was dominated by shōen feudal estates during the Heian and Kamakura periods.

=== Early modern period ===
During the Sengoku period, it was ruled by a branch of the Oda clan. The area is also the ancestral home of the Yamauchi clan, who dominated Tosa Province under the Edo period Tokugawa shogunate.

=== Late modern period ===
With the establishment of the modern municipalities system after the start of the Meiji period, the village of Iwakura was established within Niwa District, Aichi Prefecture in 1889. It was raised to town status in 1892, and expanded through merger with three neighboring villages in 1906.

=== Contemporary history ===
Iwakura was elevated to city status on December 1, 1971.

== Government ==
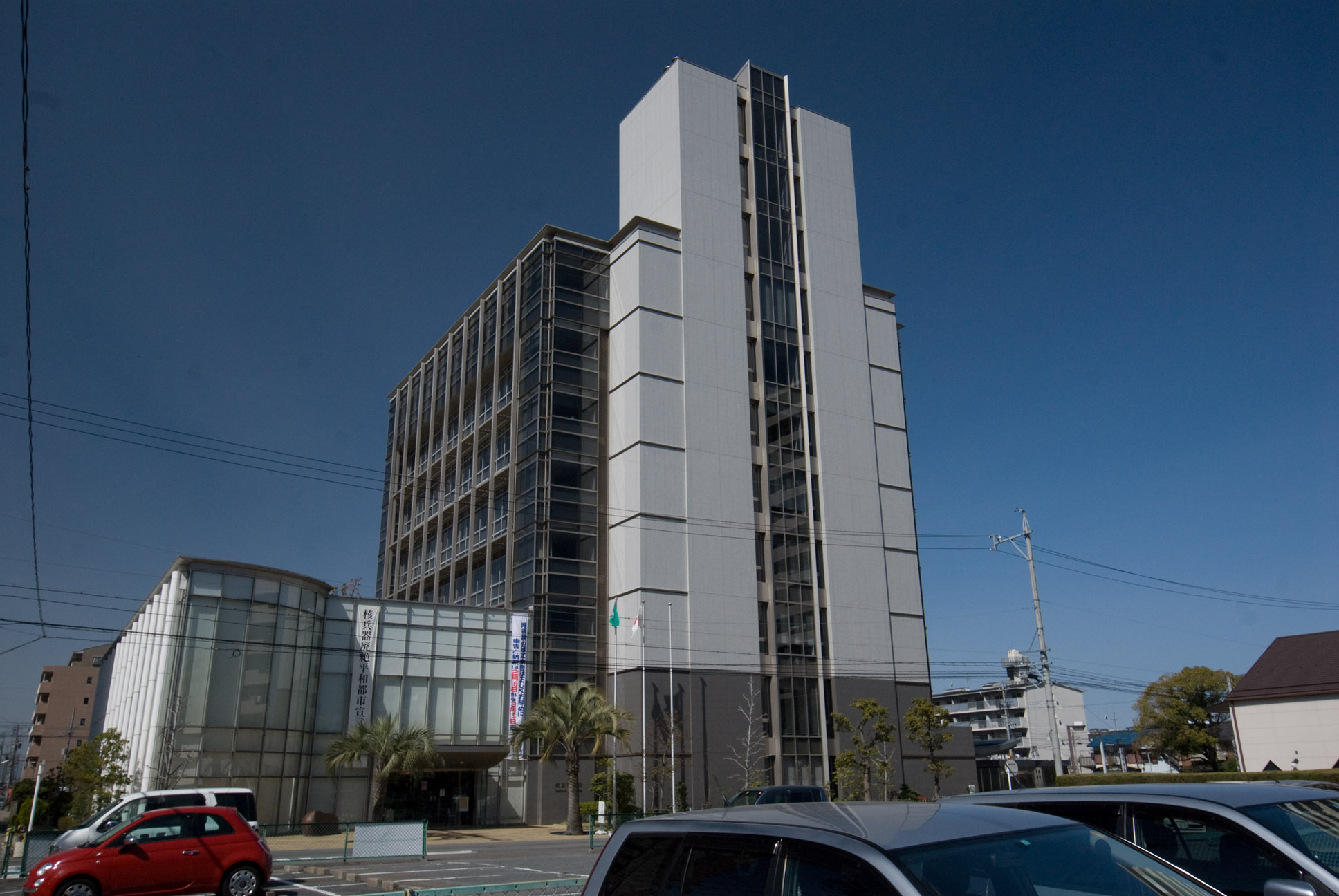
Iwakura city hall

Iwakura has a mayor-council form of government with a directly elected mayor and a unicameral city legislature of 15 members. The city contributes one member to the Aichi Prefectural Assembly. In terms of national politics, the city is part of Aichi District 10 of the lower house of the Diet of Japan. Iwakura City Hall has been recognized as one of the most prestigious local government organizations in Aichi prefecture.

== Economy ==
Iwakura was traditionally noted for sericulture. Currently, agriculture and light manufacturing dominate the local economy.

=== Secondary sector of the economy ===
==== Manufacturing ====
Ishizuka Glass Co., Ltd. is headquartered in Iwakura.

== Education ==
=== Schools ===
Iwakura has five public elementary schools and two public middle schools operated by the city government and one public high school operated by the Aichi Prefectural Board of Education. There are a large number of residents in Iwakura from Brazil and city hall public information is always distributed in both English and Portuguese. Iwakura has an education system which promotes foreign language and cultures.

== Transportation ==
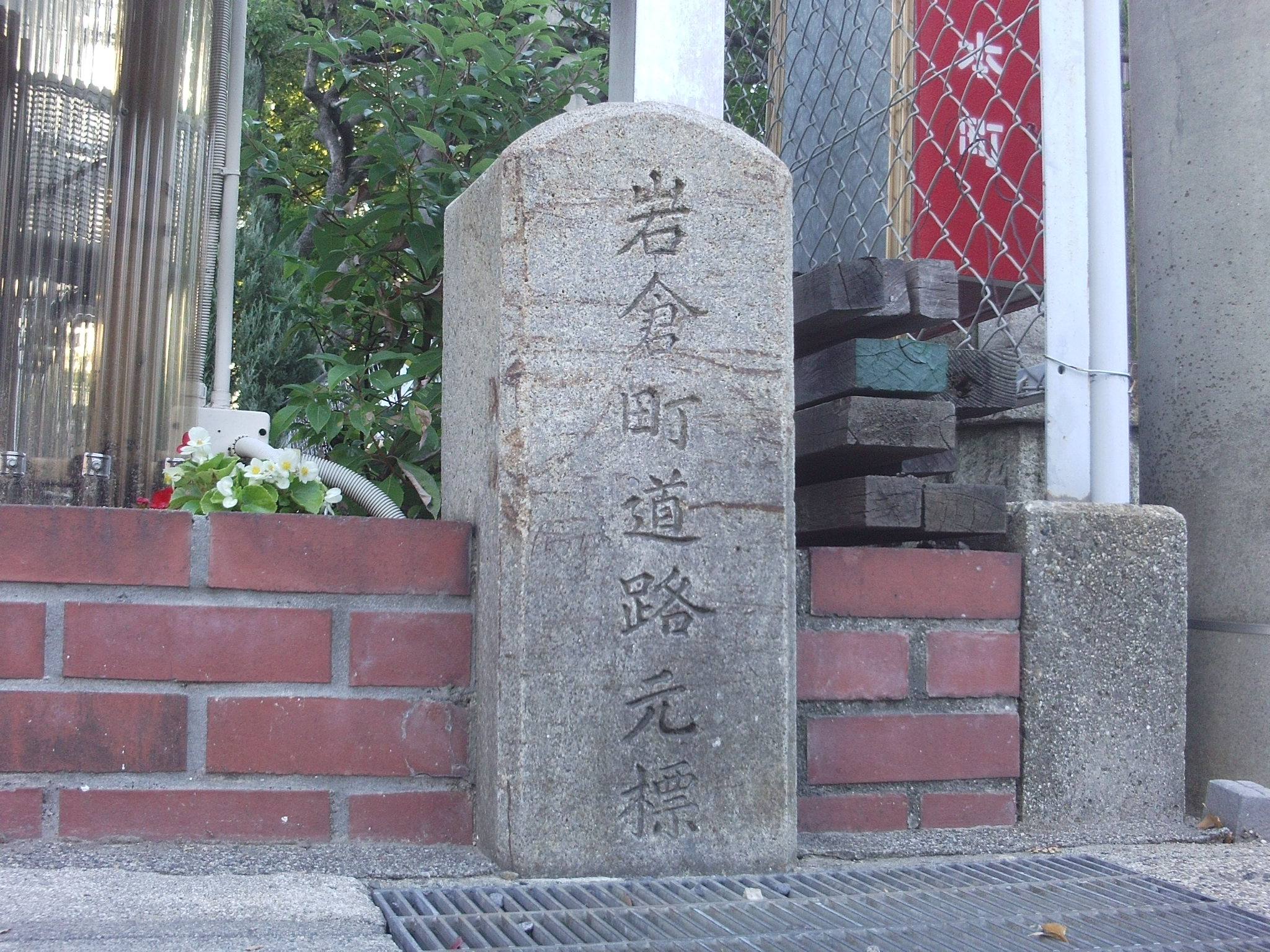
The Kilometre Zero of Iwakura

=== Railways ===
==== Conventional lines ====
Meitetsu

- Inuyama Line：- Taisanji – Iwakura – Ishibotoke -

=== Roads ===
==== Expressways ====
- Meishin Expressway

==== Japan National Route ====
- National Route 155

== Local attractions ==
- Iwakura castle
- Iwakura city historic park
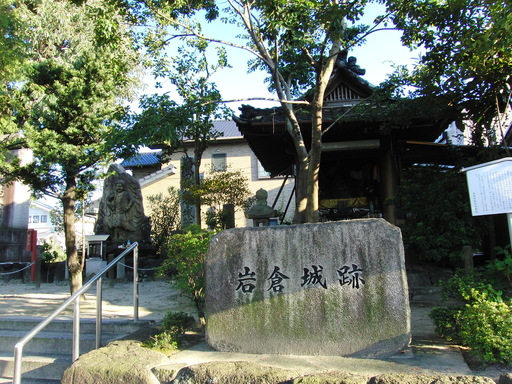
Iwakura castle

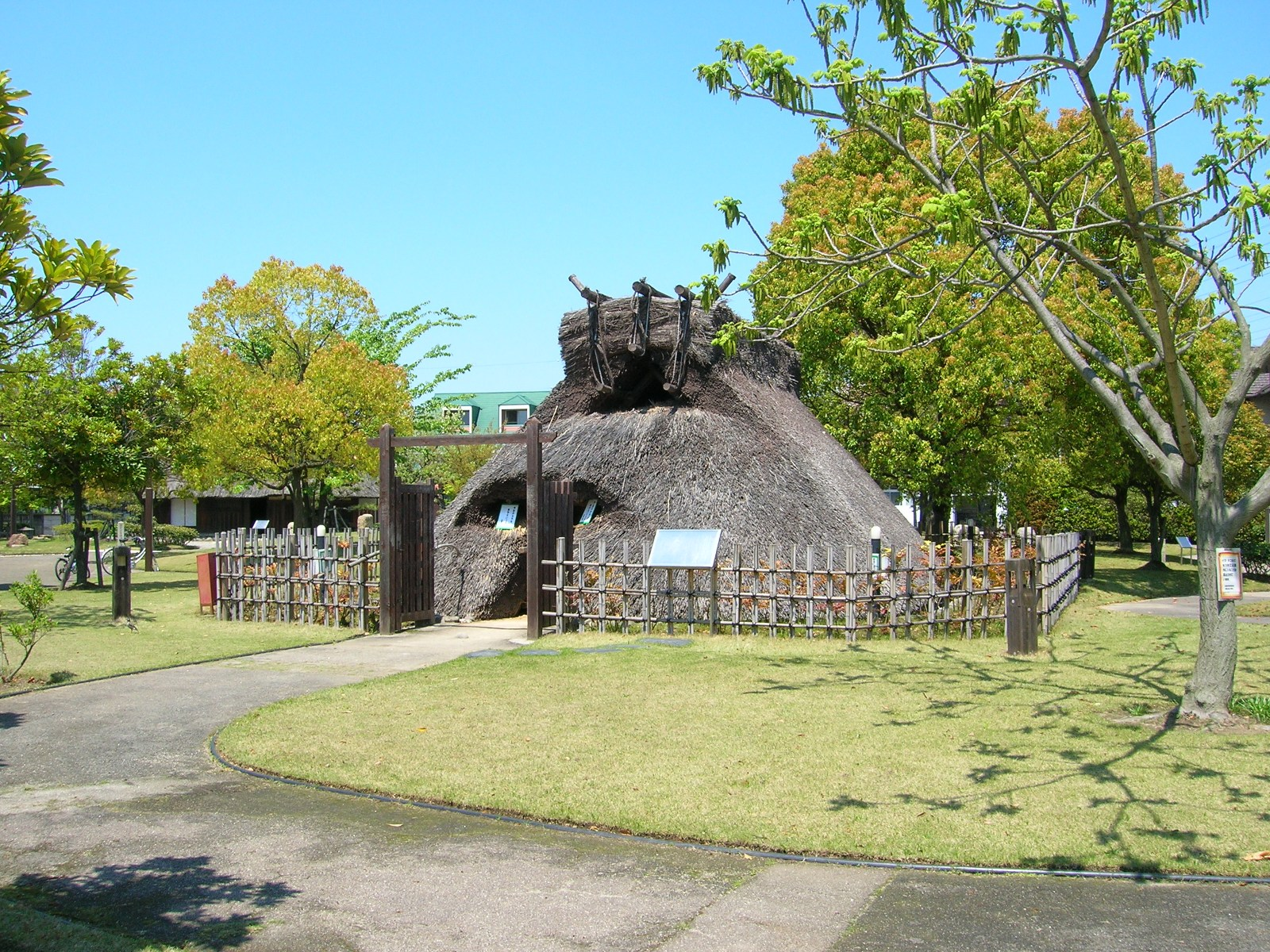
Iwakura city historic park
