= Fusō, Aichi =

Town in Aichi Prefecture, Japan

Fusō 扶桑町
- Town
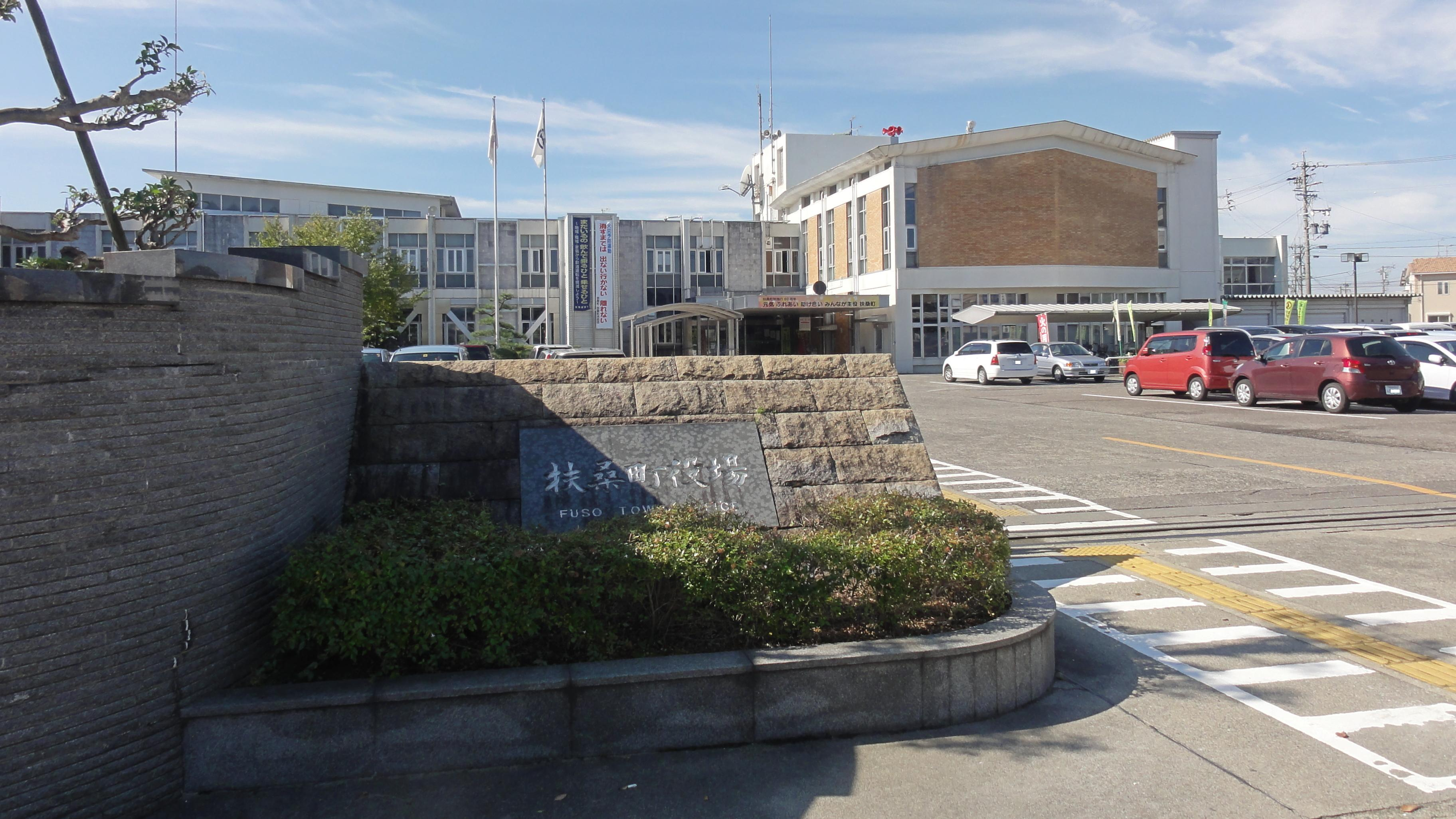
- Fusō Town Hall

- Flag Coat of arms

- Location of Fusō in Aichi Prefecture

- Coordinates: 35°21′32.7″N 136°54′47.6″E
- Country: Japan
- Region: Chūbu region Tōkai region
- Prefecture: Aichi
- District: Niwa

Government
  - - Mayor: Mitsuru Edo

Area
  - Total: 11.19 km^{2} (4.32 sq mi)

Population (October 1, 2019)
  - Total: 34,144
  - Density: 3,051/km^{2} (7,903/sq mi)
- Time zone: UTC+9 (Japan Standard Time)
- Tree: Live oak
- Flower: Sunflower
- Phone number: 0587-93-1111
- Address: Takao Oaza Tendo 330, Fusō-chō, Niwa-gun, Aichi-ken 480-0102
- Website: Official website (in Japanese)

Fusō (扶桑町, Fusō-chō) is a town located in Niwa District, Aichi Prefecture, Japan. As of 1 October 2019, the town had an estimated population of 34,144 in 14,017 households, and a population density of 3,051 persons per km^{2}. The total area of the town was 11.19 square kilometres (4.32 sq mi).

== Geography ==
Fusō is located in the extreme northeast corner of Aichi Prefecture, bordering on Gifu Prefecture. The Kiso and Gojō rivers flow through the town.

=== Neighboring municipalities ===
Aichi Prefecture

- Inuyama
- Kōnan
- Ōguchi

Gifu Prefecture

- Kakamigahara

== Demographics ==
Per Japanese census data, the population of Fuso has been relatively steady over the past 70 years.

Historical population
| Year | Pop. | ±% |
|---|---|---|
| 1940 | 8,246 | — |
| 1950 | 10,549 | +27.9% |
| 1960 | 11,344 | +7.5% |
| 1970 | 21,317 | +87.9% |
| 1980 | 27,254 | +27.9% |
| 1990 | 29,210 | +7.2% |
| 2000 | 31,728 | +8.6% |
| 2010 | 33,560 | +5.8% |

=== Climate ===
The town has a climate characterized by hot and humid summers, and relatively mild winters (Köppen climate classification Cfa). The average annual temperature in Agui is 15.5 °C. The average annual rainfall is 1872 mm with September as the wettest month. The temperatures are highest on average in August, at around 28.1 °C, and lowest in January, at around 4.0 °C.

== History ==
The area of Fuso was mostly part of Owari Domain under the Edo period Tokugawa shogunate. After the Meiji restoration, the villages of Yamana and Toyokuni were established within Niwa District, Aichi in 1872 with the establishment of the modern municipalities system. Fusō Village was established on October 1, 1906, through the merger of Yamana and Toyokuni with a portion of neighboring Takao and Kashiwamori. Fusō was raised to town status on August 1, 1952.

== Economy ==
During the pre-modern period, the area was noted for sericulture and the production of mulberry leaves. Agriculture, notably the growing of daikon radishes, is a mainstay of the local economy.

== Education ==
Fusō has four public elementary schools and two public junior high schools operated by the town government, and one public high school operated by the Aichi Prefectural Board of Education. There is also one private high school.

== Transportation ==
=== Railway ===
Meitetsu – Inuyama Line

- Kashiwamori - Fusō - Kotsuyōsui

=== Highway ===
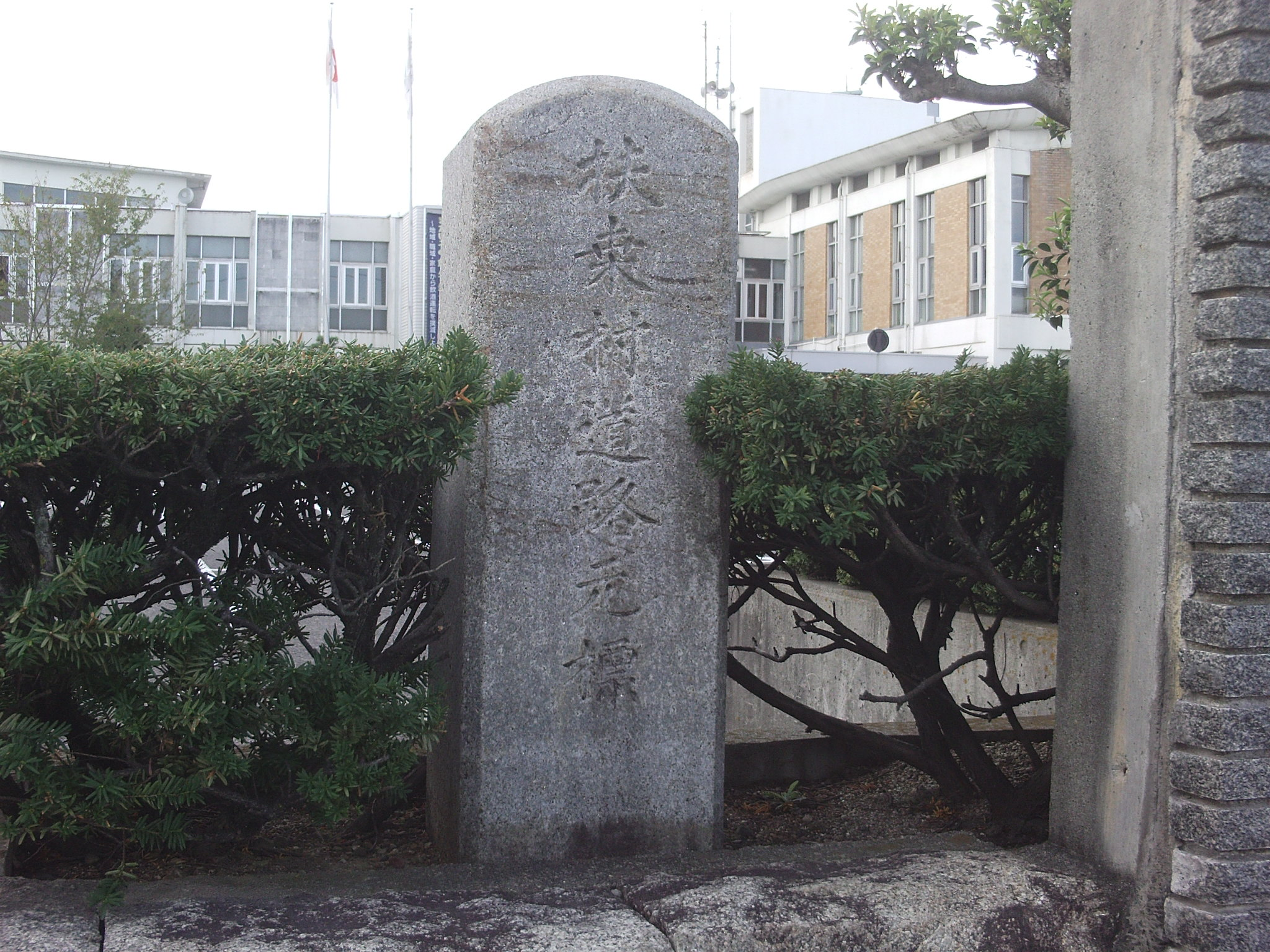
The Kilometre Zero of Fuso

- National Route 41
