= Meitetsu Inuyama Line =

Railway line in Aichi Prefecture, Japan

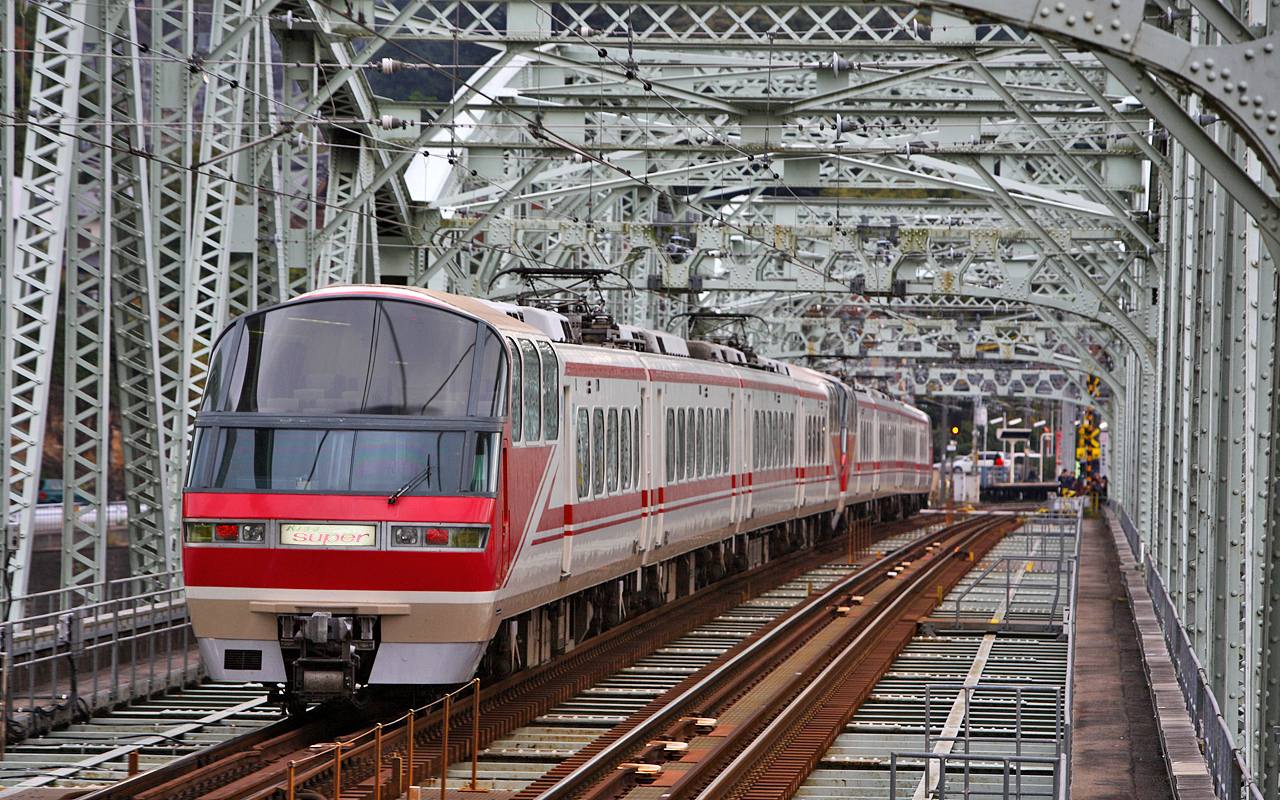
- A Meitetsu 1000 series EMU on Inuyama Bridge

Overview
- Native name: 名鉄犬山線
- Owner: Meitetsu
- Locale: Aichi Prefecture, Gifu Prefecture
- Termini: Shimo-Otai (Biwajima Junction); Shin-Unuma
- Stations: 17

Service
- Type: Commuter rail
- Daily ridership: 57,443 (FY2008)

History
- Opened: 1910; 116 years ago

Technical
- Line length: 26.8 km (16.65 mi)
- Track gauge: 1,067 mm (3 ft 6 in)
- Electrification: 1,500 V DC, overhead catenary
- Operating speed: 110 km/h (68 mph)

The Meitetsu Inuyama Line (名鉄犬山線, Meitetsu Inuyama-sen) is a 26.8 km Japanese railway line operated by the private railway operator Nagoya Railroad (Meitetsu), which connects Biwajima Junction in Kiyosu with Shin-Unuma station in Kakamigahara. Together with the Meitetsu Kakamigahara Line, the line forms an alternate route of the Meitetsu Nagoya Main Line between Higashi-Biwajima and Meitetsu Gifu.

== Stations ==
● Local (普通, futsū) (L)
● Semi-Express (準急, junkyū) (S)
● Express (急行, kyūkō) (E)
● Rapid Express (快速急行, kaisoku kyūkō) (R)
● Limited Express (特急, tokkyū) (LE)
● Rapid Limited Express (快速特急, kaisoku tokkyū) (RL)
● μSKY Limited Express (ミュースカイ, myū sukai) (MU)

All trains stop at stations marked "●" and pass stations marked "|". Some trains stop at "▲".

No.	Station	Japanese	Distance (km)	L	S	E	R	LE	RL	MU	Transfers	Location	
	Biwajima Junction	枇杷島分岐点	-	|	|	|	|	|	|	|	■ Meitetsu Nagoya Main Line	Kiyosu	Aichi
IY01	Shimo-Otai	下小田井	1.0	●	|	▲	|	|	|	|		Kiyosu	Aichi
IY02	Naka-Otai	中小田井	2.4	●	|	▲	|	|	|	|		Nishi-ku, Nagoya	Aichi
IY03	Kami-Otai	上小田井	3.5	●	●	●	●	|	|	|	Nagoya Subway: ■ Tsurumai Line (T01) JR-Central Transport Service Jōhoku Line (Otai)	Nishi-ku, Nagoya	Aichi
IY04	Nishiharu	西春	5.9	●	●	●	●	|	|	|		Kitanagoya	Aichi
IY05	Tokushige-Nagoya-Geidai	徳重・名古屋芸大	7.3	●	|	|	|	|	|	|		Kitanagoya	Aichi
IY06	Taisanji	大山寺	8.1	●	|	|	|	|	|	|		Iwakura	Aichi
IY07	Iwakura	岩倉	9.7	●	●	●	●	●	●	●		Iwakura	Aichi
IY08	Ishibotoke	石仏	11.8	●	●	|	|	|	|	|		Iwakura	Aichi
IY09	Hotei	布袋	14.2	●	●	●	●	|	|	|		Kōnan	Aichi
IY10	Kōnan	江南	16.2	●	●	●	●	●	●	●		Kōnan	Aichi
IY11	Kashiwamori	柏森	19.0	●	●	●	●	●	●	▲		Fusō	Aichi
IY12	Fusō	扶桑	21.2	●	●	●	●	|	|	|		Fusō	Aichi
IY13	Kotsuyōsui	木津用水	22.6	●	●	|	|	|	|	|		Fusō	Aichi
IY14	Inuyamaguchi	犬山口	24.0	●	●	|	|	|	|	|		Inuyama	Aichi
IY15	Inuyama	犬山	24.9	●	●	●	●	●	●	●	■ Meitetsu Komaki Line ■ Meitetsu Hiromi Line	Inuyama	Aichi
IY16	Inuyama-Yūen	犬山遊園	26.1	●	●	●	●	●	●	●		Inuyama	Aichi
IY17	Shin-Unuma	新鵜沼	26.8	●	●	●	●	●	●	●	■ Meitetsu Kakamigahara Line; Takayama Main Line	Kakamigahara	Gifu

== History ==
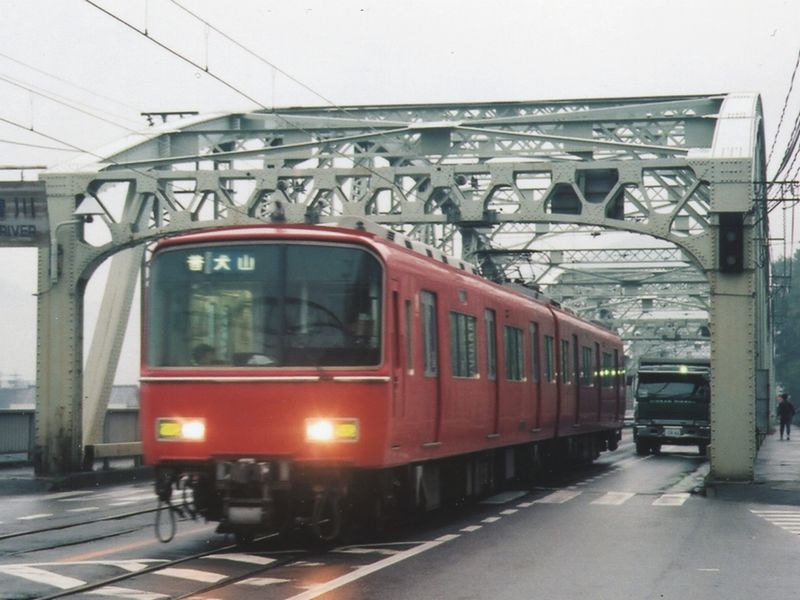
Inuyama combined rail and road bridge in 1996

The Nagoya Electric Railway (later Meitetsu) opened the Biwajima to Iwakura section, as an interurban electrified at 600 V DC, in 1910. The line was extended to Inuyama in 1912 built with double tracks. In 1922, the Biwajima to Iwakura section was double-tracked, and in 1926, the line was extended as dual track to Shin-Unuma, including a combined rail and road bridge over the river Kiso.

In 1948, the voltage was increased to 1,500 V DC, and in 1993 through services commenced on the Nagoya Municipal Subway Tsurumai Line. The road utilising the Kisogawa rail bridge was diverted onto its own bridge in 2000, ending the last such combined bridge usage in Japan.

=== Former connecting lines ===
- Iwakura Station: The Nagoya Electric Railway opened a 7 km line electrified at 600 V DC to Ichinomiya on the Nagoya Main Line in 1913. The voltage on the line was increased to 1,500 V DC in 1948, and the line closed in 1965. The company opened a 6 km line electrified at 600 V DC to Komaki on the Komaki Line in 1920. The voltage on the line was increased to 1,500 V DC in 1955, and the line closed in 1964.
