= Iwakura Station (Aichi) =

Railway station in Iwakura, Aichi Prefecture, Japan

Iwakura Station 岩倉駅

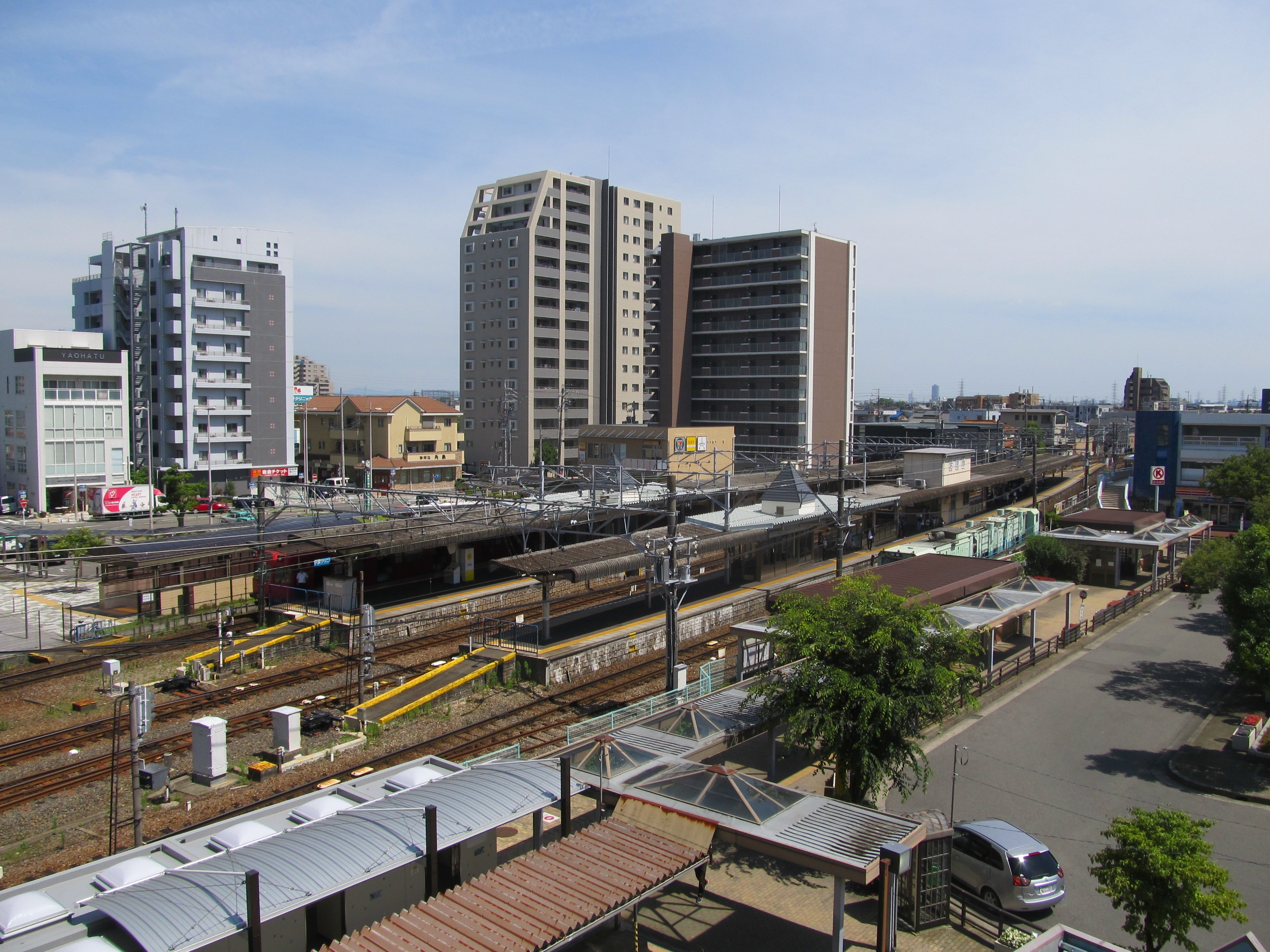
- Iwakura Station, June 2018

General information
- Location: Itchōda-34 Honmachi, Iwakura-shi, Aichi-ken 482-0043; Japan
- Coordinates: 35.2781°N 136.874°E
- Operator: Meitetsu
- Line: ■ Meitetsu Inuyama Line
- Distance: 9.7 kilometers from Biwajima
- Platforms: 2 island platforms

Other information
- Status: Staffed
- Station code: IY07
- Website: Official website

History
- Opened: 6 August 1912

Passengers
- FY2017: 24,535

Services
Preceding station	Meitetsu	Following station
Meitetsu Nagoya towards Central Japan International Airport	μSky	Kōnan towards Shin-Unuma
Meitetsu Nagoya towards Toyohashi	Inuyama Line Rapid Limited Express Limited Express	Kōnan towards Shin-Unuma
Nishiharu towards Shimo Otai	Inuyama Line Rapid Express Express	Hotei towards Shin-Unuma
Nishiharu towards Shimo Otai	Inuyama Line Semi Express	Ishibotoke towards Shin-Unuma
Taisanji towards Shimo Otai	Inuyama Line Local	Ishibotoke towards Shin-Unuma
Location
- Location within Aichi Prefecture Location within Japan

Track layout

Iwakura Station (岩倉駅, Iwakura-eki) is a railway station in the city of Iwakura, Aichi Prefecture, Japan, operated by Meitetsu.

== Lines ==
Iwakura Station is served by the Meitetsu Inuyama Line, and is located 9.7 kilometers from the starting point of the line at Biwajima.

== Station layout ==
The station has two island platforms connected by an underground passage. The station has automated ticket machines, Manaca automated turnstiles, and is unattended.

=== Platforms ===
1	■ Inuyama Line	for Kōnan, Inuyama, Shin Unuma, Meitetsu Gifu, and Shin Kani
2	■ Inuyama Line	for Kōnan, Inuyama, Shin Unuma, Meitetsu Gifu, and Shin Kani
3	■ Inuyama Line	for Meitetsu Nagoya and Central Japan International Airport
4	■ Inuyama Line	for Meitetsu Nagoya and Central Japan International Airport

== Station history ==
Iwakura Station was opened on 6 August 1912. From September 1920 to April 1964, a spur line connected the Inuyama Line with Komaki Station. A new station building was opened in September 1965 and was expanded from 2004 to 2005.

== Passenger statistics ==
In fiscal 2017, the station was used by an average of 24,535 passengers daily.

== Surrounding area ==
- Iwakura City Hall

== See also ==
- List of railway stations in Japan
