= Niwa District =

District in Aichi prefecture, Japan

Coordinates: 35.3465°N 136.913°E

Map of Niwa District in Aichi Prefecture

Niwa (丹羽郡, Niwa-gun) is a district located in northwestern Aichi Prefecture, Japan.

As of October 1, 2019, the district had an estimated population of 58,304 with a density of 2,351 persons per km^{2}. The total area is 24.79 km^{2}.

== Municipalities ==
The district consists of two towns:

- Fusō (Note: Classified as a town.)
- Ōguchi

== History ==
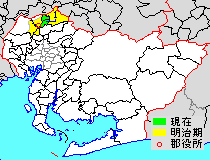
Map showing original extent of Niwa District in Aichi Prefecture: * yellow - areas formerly within the district borders during the early Meiji period: 1. Fusō-machi; 2. Ōguchi-machi

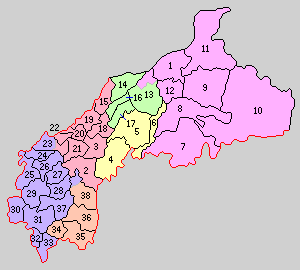
Colored areas are in this district.
