= Shimo Otai Station =

Railway station in Kiyosu, Aichi Prefecture, Japan

Shimo Otai Station 下小田井駅

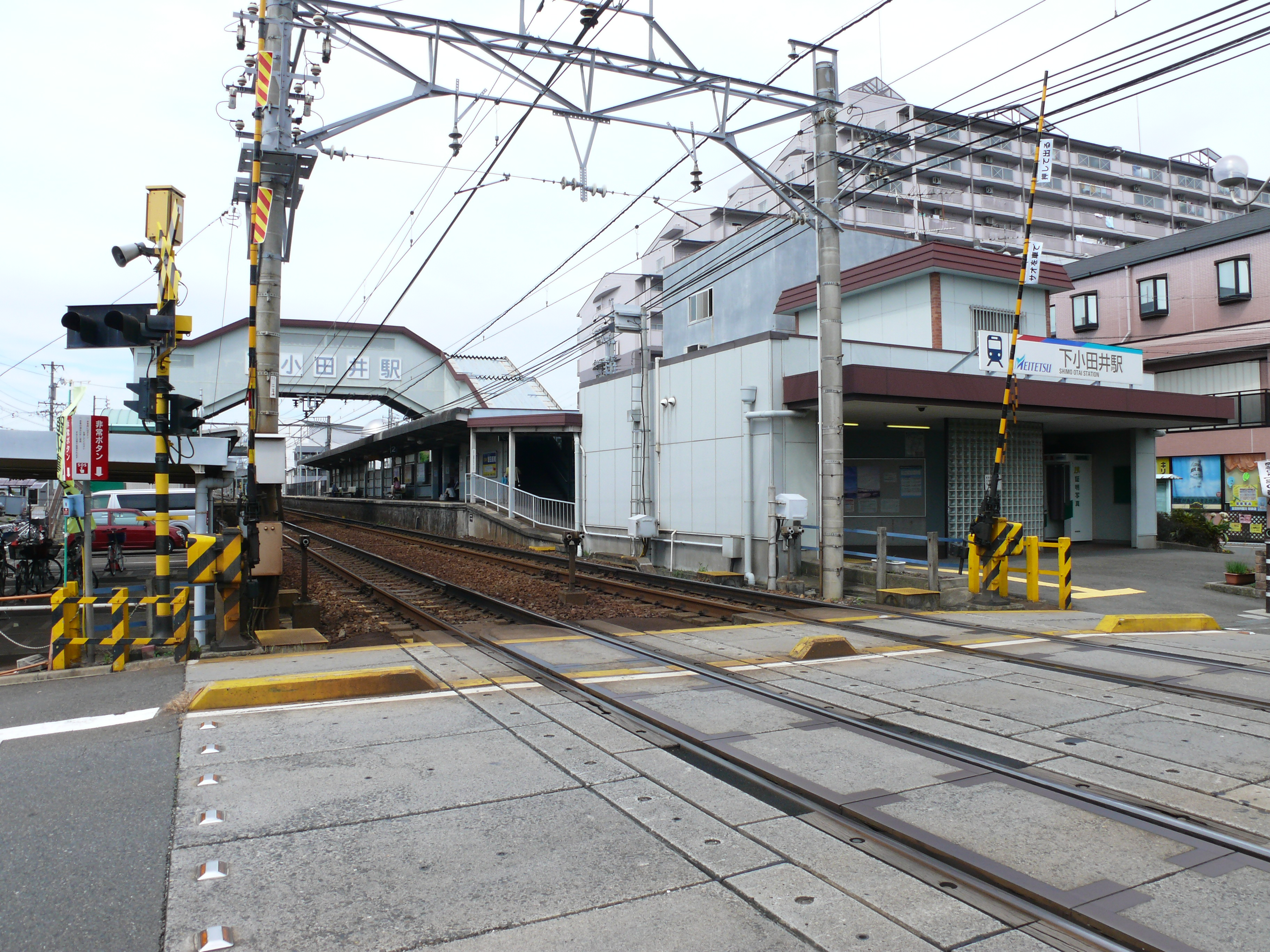
- Shimo Otai Station, July 2007

General information
- Location: 36 Nishibiwajimachō Kamishin, Kiyosu-shi, Aichi-ken 452-0022; Japan
- Coordinates: 35.2016°N 136.8707°E
- Operator: Meitetsu
- Line: ■ Meitetsu Inuyama Line
- Distance: 1.0 kilometers from Biwajima
- Platforms: 2 side platforms

Other information
- Status: Unstaffed
- Station code: IY01
- Website: Official website

History
- Opened: August 6, 1912

Passengers
- FY2013: 3,366

Services
Preceding station	Meitetsu	Following station
Sakō towards Toyohashi	Inuyama Line Express	Naka-Otai towards Shin-Unuma
Higashi-Biwajima towards Ina	Inuyama Line Local	Naka-Otai towards Shin-Unuma
Location
- Location within Aichi Prefecture Location within Japan

Shimo Otai Station (下小田井駅, Shimo Otai-eki) is a railway station in the city of Kiyosu, Aichi Prefecture, Japan, operated by Meitetsu.

== Lines ==
Shimo Otai Station is served by the Meitetsu Inuyama Line, and is located 1 km (0.62 mi) from the starting point of the line at Biwajima.

== Station layout ==
The station has two opposed side platforms connected by a footbridge. The station has automated ticket machines, Manaca automated turnstiles and is unattended.

=== Platforms ===
1	■ Inuyama Line	For Iwakura and Inuyama
2	■ Inuyama Line	For Meitetsu-Nagoya and Kanayama

== Station history ==
Shimo Otai Station was opened on August 6, 1912. It has been unattended since 2004.

== Passenger statistics ==
In fiscal 2013, the station was used by an average of 3,366 passengers daily.

== Surrounding area ==
- former Nishibiwa Town Hall
- ruins of Otai Castle
- Japan National Route 22

== See also ==
- List of railway stations in Japan
