= Biwajima Station =

Railway station in Kiyosu, Aichi Prefecture, Japan

CA69 Biwajima Station 枇杷島駅
- Biwajima Station in May 2026

General information
- Location: Nishi-Biwajima-cho, Nanasewari, Kiyosu-shi, Aichi-ken 452-0063; Japan
- Coordinates: 35.1986582°N 136.8618178°E
- Operator: JR Central; JR-Central Transport Service
- Lines: ■ Tōkaidō Main Line; ■ Jōhoku Line
- Distance: 370.0 kilometers from Tokyo
- Platforms: 2 island platforms

Other information
- Status: Staffed
- Station code: CA69
- Website: Official website

History
- Opened: April 1, 1886
- Former names: Kiyosu (to 1906)

Passengers
- 2023–2024: 7,763 daily

Services
Preceding station	JR Central	Following station
Kiyosu towards Maibara	Tōkaidō Main Line Local	Nagoya towards Atami
Location
- Location within Aichi Prefecture Location within Japan

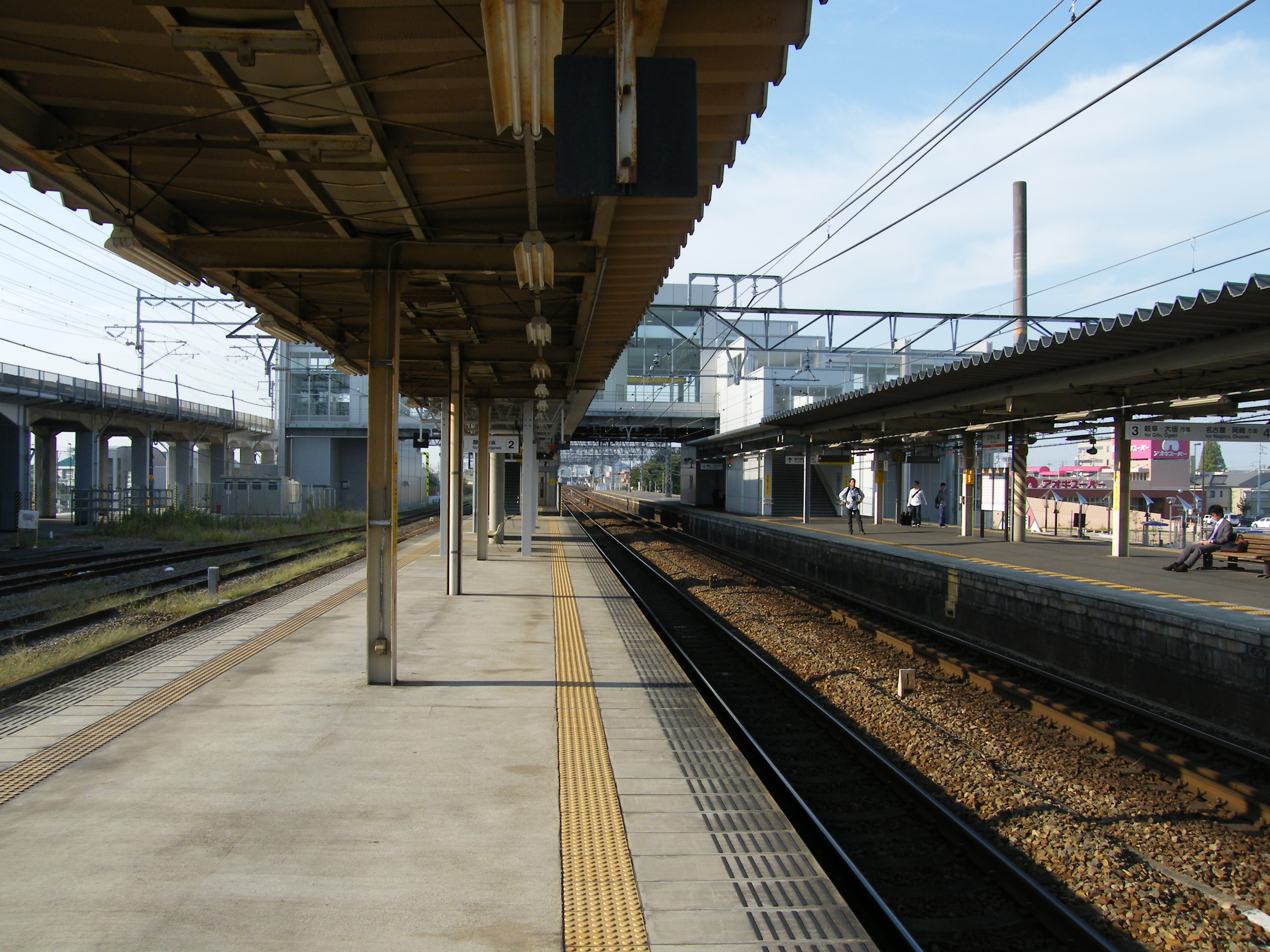
Platforms

Biwajima Station (枇杷島駅, Biwajima-eki) is a railway station in the city of Kiyosu, Aichi Prefecture, Japan, operated by Central Japan Railway Company (JR Tōkai) and the JR-Central Transport Service Company (TKJ).

Biwajima Station is served by the Tōkaidō Main Line, and is located 370.0 kilometers from the starting point of the line at Tokyo Station. It is also a terminal station for the TKJ Jōhoku Line, and is located 11.2 kilometers from the opposite terminus at Kachigawa.

== Station layout ==
The station has two island platforms connected by a footbridge. The station building has automated ticket machines, TOICA automated turnstiles and a staffed ticket office.

=== Platforms ===
1	■ JR-Central Transport Service Jōhoku Line	For Kachigawa
2	■ JR-Central Transport Service Jōhoku Line	For Kachigawa
3	■ Tōkaidō Main Line	For Gifu and Ōgaki
4	■ Tōkaidō Main Line	For Nagoya and Okazaki

== Adjacent stations ==
«	Service	»
JR-Central Transport Service Company
Jōhoku Line
Owari-Hoshinomiya	Local	Terminus

== History ==
Biwajima Station was opened on April 1, 1886 as Kiyosu Station (清洲駅, Kiyosu-eki) on the Japanese Government Railway (JGR) Tōkaidō Line. The station was relocated to its present location and renamed to its present name on April 16, 1906. The JGR became the JNR after World War II. The station building was rebuilt in March 1953. Along with the division and privatization of JNR on April 1, 1987, the station came under the control and operation of the Central Japan Railway Company. All freight services came to an end in 2006. A new station building was completed in December 2008.

Station numbering was introduced to the section of the Tōkaidō Line operated by JR Central in March 2018; Biwajima Station was assigned station number CA69.

== Passenger statistics ==
In fiscal 2013, the station was used by an average of 3886 passengers daily.

== Surrounding area ==
- former Nishibiwajima Town Hall

== See also ==
- List of railway stations in Japan
