= Inuyama =

Inuyama may refer to:

- Aoi Inuyama, a character in Laid-Back Camp
- Inuko Inuyama, Japanese voice actor
- Inuyama, Aichi, a Japanese city
- Inuyama Castle, a castle in the city of Inuyama
- Inuyama Station, a railway station in the city of Inuyama
- Inuyama Bridge, a river connecting Aichi and Gifu Prefectures in Japan
- Inuyama ware, an art style associated with the city of Inuyama
- Inuyama Domain, a former Japanese feudal domain in what is now Aichi Prefecture
