= Hatsumōde =

First Buddhist or Shinto temple visit of the Japanese New Year

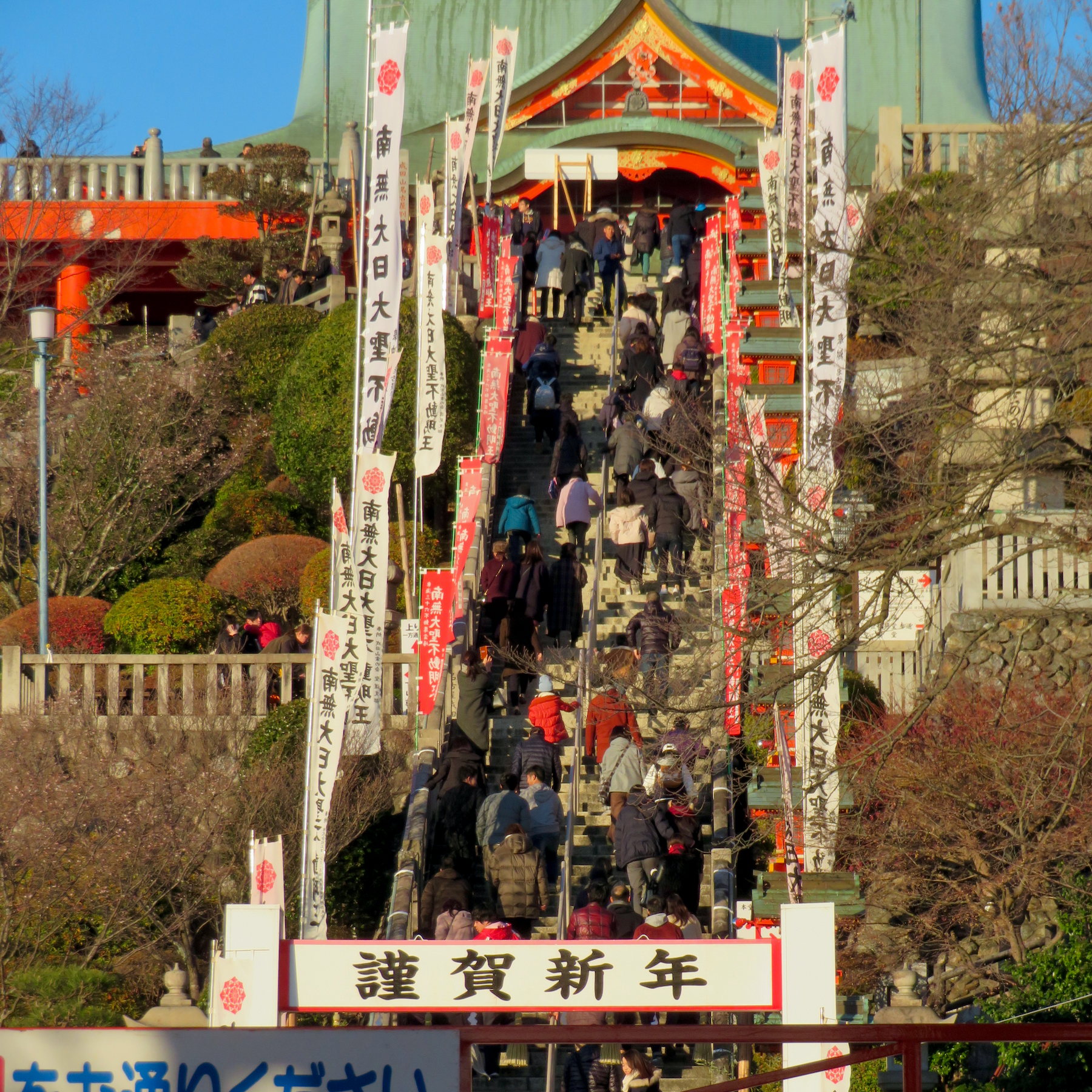
Hatsumōde at Daishō-ji in Inuyama, Aichi

Hatsumōde (初詣, hatsumōde) is one of the major Japanese traditions of the new year, which is the first visit to a Buddhist temple or Shinto shrine of the Japanese New Year. Typically taking place on the first, second, or third day of the year, it is meant to bring a fresh start to the year. Hatsumōde is written with two kanji: the former means “first” and the latter means “visiting a shrine or temple.”

Many visit on the first, second, or third day of the year. Generally, wishes for the new year are made, new omamori (charms or amulets) are bought, and the old ones are returned to the shrine so they can be cremated. Major shrines throughout Japan often have long queues.

Most people in Japan outside of the retail and emergency service professions are off work from December 29 until January 3 of every year. It is during this time that the house is cleaned, debts are paid, friends and family are visited and gifts are exchanged. It is customary to spend the early morning of New Year's Day in domestic worship, followed by consumption of sake (toso) and special celebration food (e.g. osechi, zōni).

The tradition is believed to be fairly recent and primarily created during the Meiji era by railway companies seeking to drive custom.

Some shrines and temples have millions of visitors over the three days. Sensoji temple in Tokyo is the most popular one. Meiji Shrine for example had 3.45 million visitors in 1998, and in the first three days of January 2010, 3.2 million people visited Meiji Jingū, 2.98 million Narita-san, 2.96 million Kawasaki Daishi, 2.7 million Fushimi Inari-taisha, and 2.6 million Sumiyoshi Taisha. Other popular destinations include Atsuta Jingū, Tsurugaoka Hachimangū, Dazaifu Tenman-gū, and Hikawa Shrine.

A common custom during hatsumōde is to buy a written oracle called omikuji. If the omikuji predicts bad luck purchasers can tie it to a tree on the shrine grounds, in the hope that its prediction will not come true. The omikuji goes into detail, and offers predictions relating to various areas of life, such as business and love, for that year, in a similar way to horoscopes in the West. Often a good-luck charm comes with the omikuji when purchased.

Shrines make much of their money in the first week or two of the year.

== Ninenmairi ==
Ninenmairi (二年参り) is a style of Hatsumode. It is called a "two year visit" not because it takes place over two years but rather the event starts on New Year's Eve and ends on New Year's Day, thus happening over two years. People frequently write wishes for the year on Ema and Toshikoshi-soba is eaten an hour before midnight

== See also ==
- Saisakimode
- Ōmisoka
- Glossary of Shinto
- Christmas and holiday season
