= Iruka =

- Gender: Male

Origin
- Origin: Japanese

Iruka may refer to:

- Makasete Iruka!, an independent original video animation made by Akitaro Daichi
- Lake Iruka, a reservoir located near the Meiji Mura
- the Japanese word for dolphin (イルカ)

== People ==
- Soga no Iruka (died 645), statesman and son of Soga no Emishi
- Iruka, singer

== Fiction ==
- Iruka Umino, a Konohagakure ninja and instructor in the Naruto series
