= Saisaki-mode =

To go to Hatsumode before the new year

Saisaki-mode (幸先詣) referred to the practice of visiting shrines and temples earlier than usual for Hatsumōde in 2021 during the third wave of the COVID-19 pandemic. This practice aimed to avoid the usual crowds of worshippers and the resultant difficulties in maintaining social distancing. The concept was first proposed by a shrine in Fukuoka Prefecture and subsequently encouraged by the Fukuoka Prefecture Shrine Agency.

There is a traditional Japanese custom of exchanging end-of-year greetings, and preparing for the New Year by the end of December with a sentiment of hoping for an "auspicious start" to the year. This concept resonated well with this sentiment and quickly spread nationwide. There are also shrines and temples that refer to this practice as "Saisaki-mairi (幸先参り)".

== Shrines and temples that perform good luck pilgrimages ==
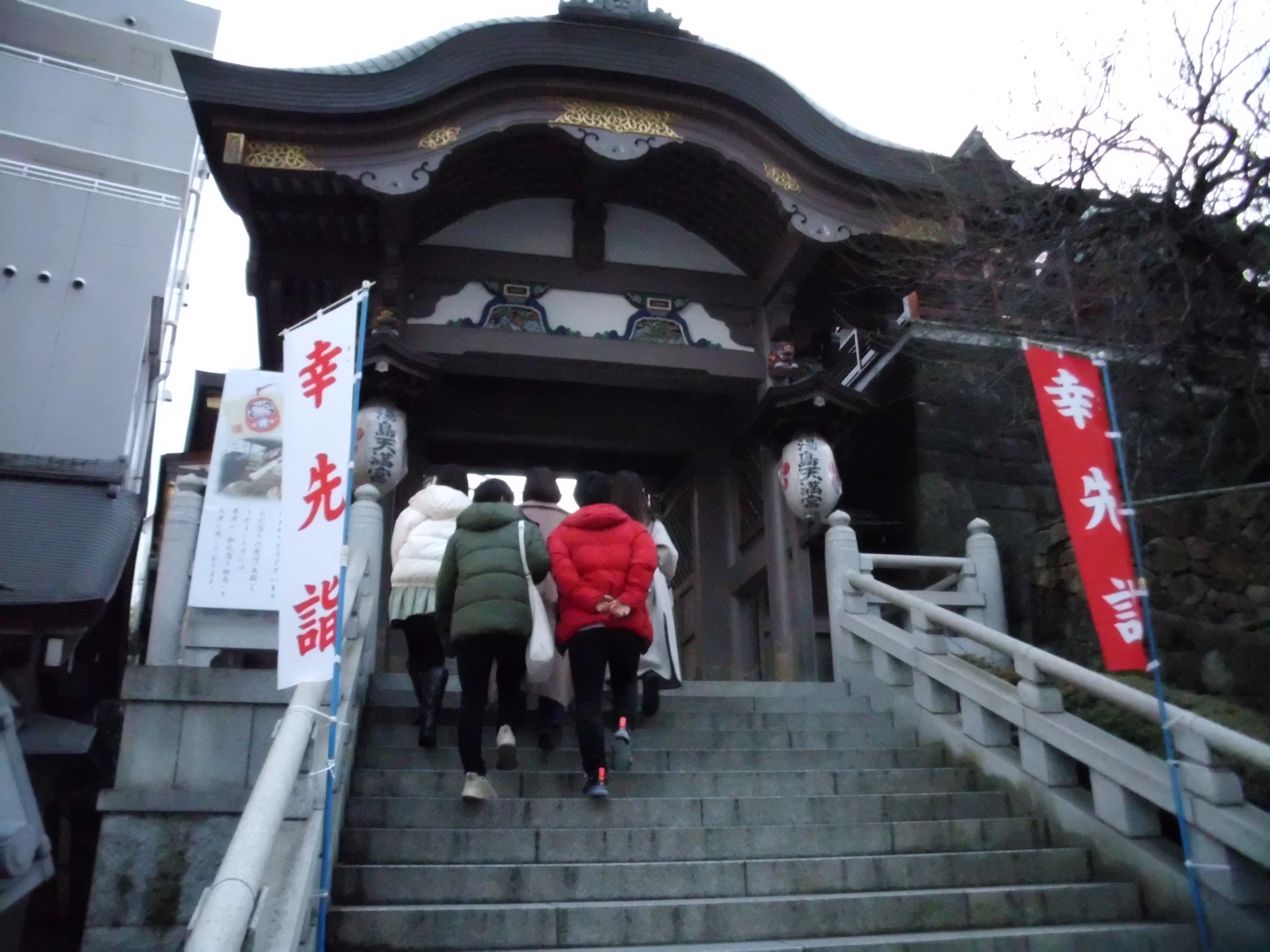
Students taking the entrance exam at Yushima Tenmangu Shrine, where a banner of "Happy New Year" is displayed.

- Shrines in Fukuoka Prefecture
- Kanda Shrine (Tokyo Chiyoda, Tokyo)
- Yushima Tenmangū (Tokyo Metropolitan Government Bunkyō)
- Jindai-ji (Tokyo, Chofu City)
- Omi Shrine (Shiga Prefecture Ōtsu)
- Kasuga-taisha (Nara Prefecture Nara City)

== See also ==
- Hatsumōde
- Impact of the COVID-19 pandemic on religion
