= Inuyama ware =

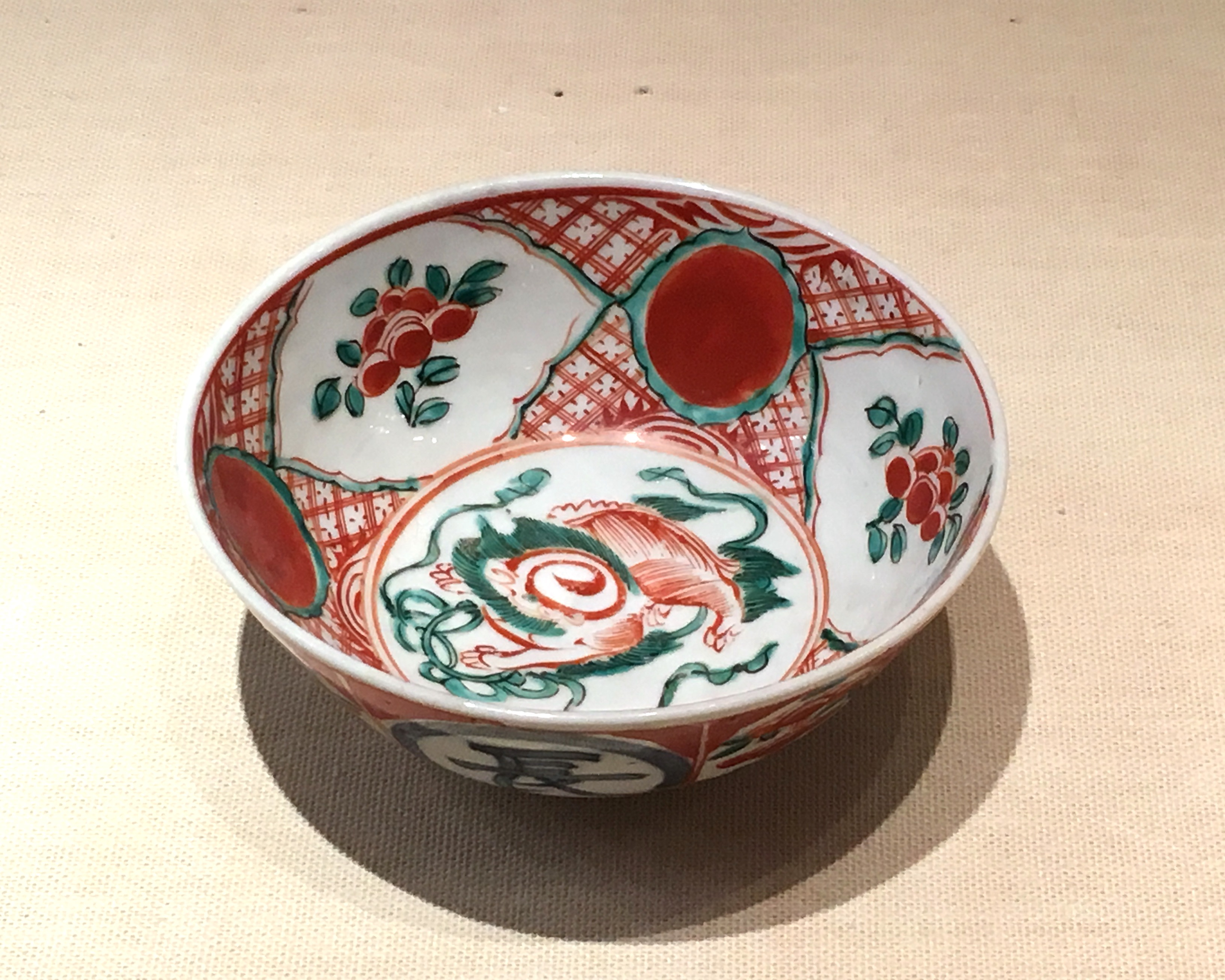
Inuyama ware bowl, overglaze enamel, Edo period, 19th century

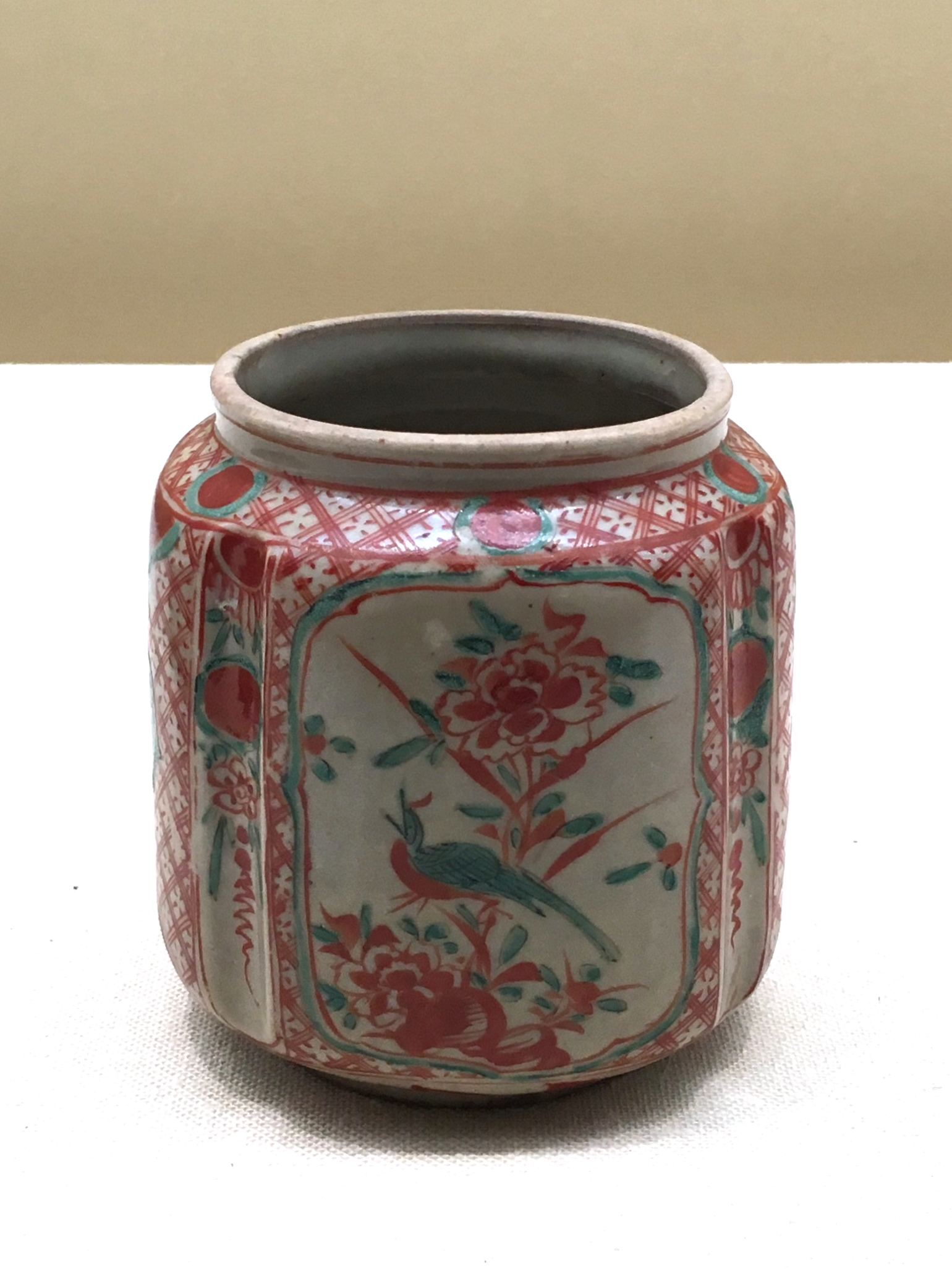
Water jar, decorated with flower and bird in overglaze enamels, Edo period, 19th century

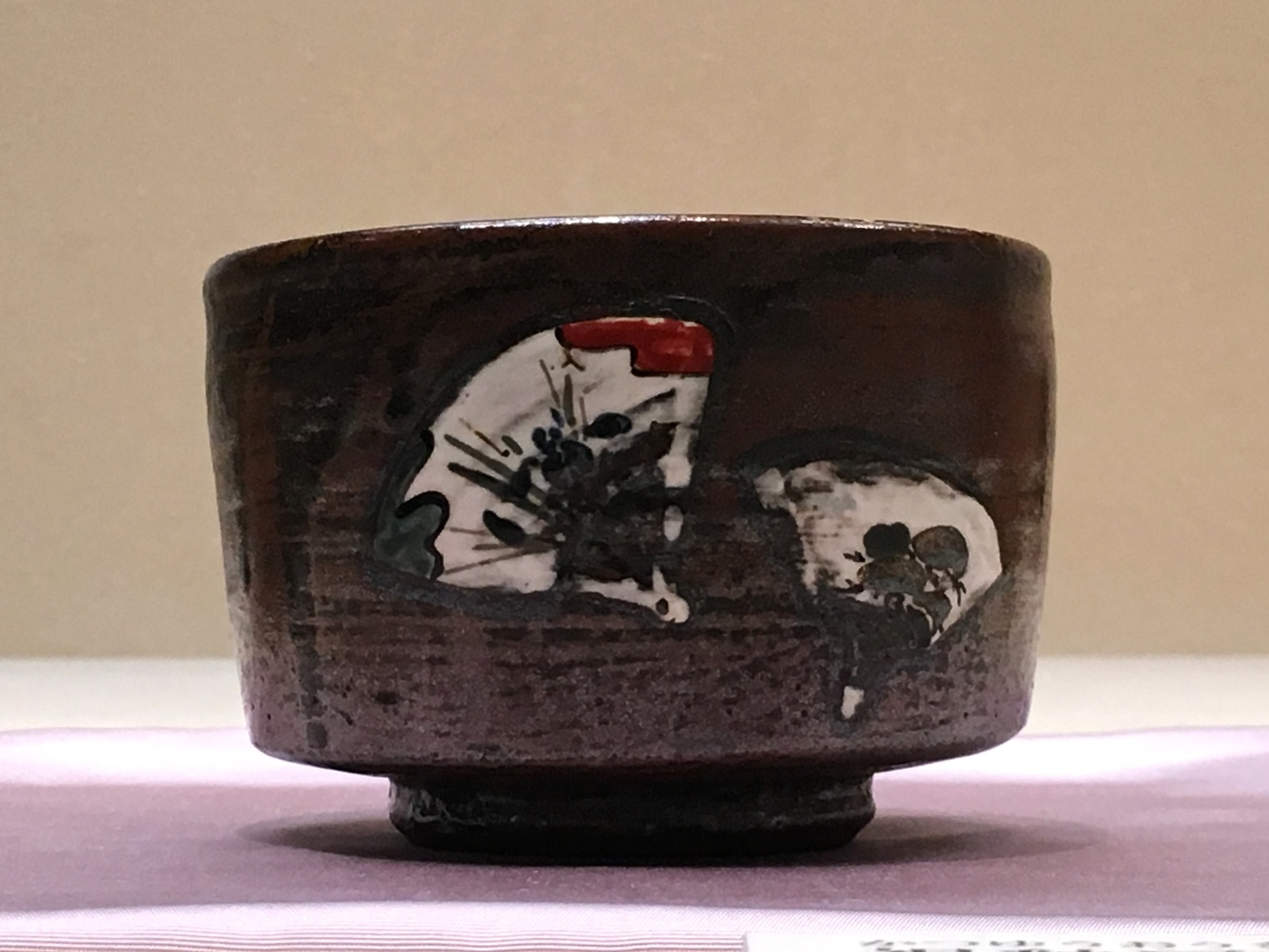
Tea bowl, design of hand fans, brown glaze and overglaze enamels. Meiji-Shōwa era, 20th century

Inuyama ware (犬山焼, Inuyama-yaki) is a type of Japanese pottery, stoneware, and ceramics produced in and around the municipality of Inuyama, Owari Province, in central Japan.

== History ==
The term refers to two kilns that produced in this area. The earlier one was located in the village of Imai (今井村) in Niwa District, which was about 4 km southeast of Inuyama Castle. The second one was the Maruyama kiln (丸山窯) at Inuyama castle, which produced the only type of ware in Owari province that was decorated primarily in different colours. The Imai kiln is said to have operated from Hōreki (1751–64) until the end of An'ei (1772–81). The Maruyama kiln opened in Bunka 7 (1810). Potters from Awataguchi (粟田口) in Kyoto's eastern area as well Kamishima village (上志段味村, today a part of Inuyama and Moriyama-ku, Nagoya) were invited.

Inuyama ware can come in many different types. Red and green coloured ware is a popular mark with flower and nature motifs.

Notable artists are Yamamoto Gempō (1866-1961), and Ozeki Sakujūrō (尾関作十郎) and studio.

== See also ==
Other pottery wares from the wider region:

- Seto ware
- Tokoname ware
