= Daishō-ji (Inuyama) =

Buddhist temple in Inuyama, Aichi

- 大聖寺
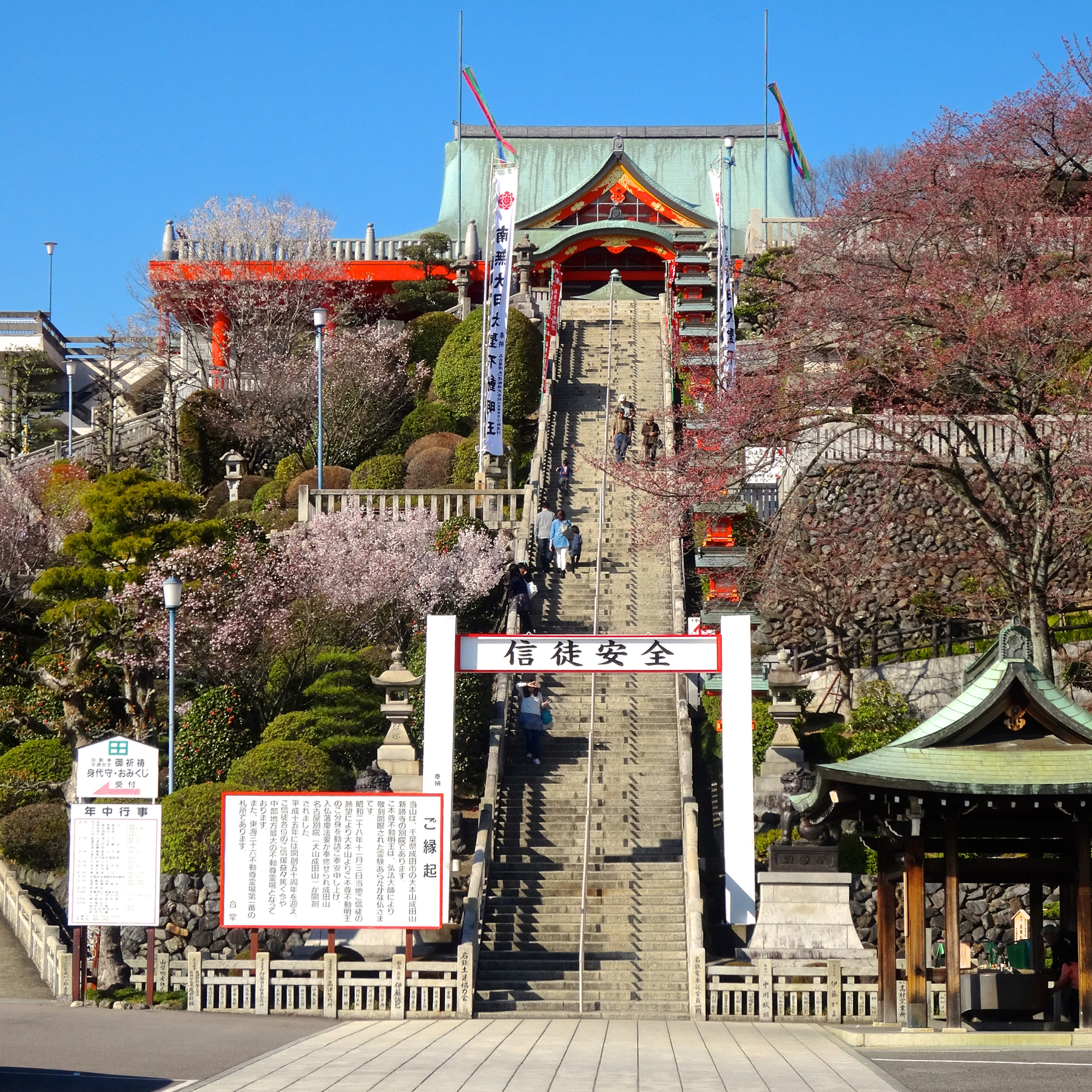

Religion
- Affiliation: Shingon

Location
- Location: Kitahakusanbira-5 Inuyama, Aichi Prefecture
- Country: Japan
- Interactive map of Daishō-ji
- Coordinates: 35°23′21″N 136°56′58″E

Architecture
- Established: 1953

Website
- inuyama-naritasan.or.jp

Daishō-ji (Japanese: 大聖寺); full name Daihonzan Naritasan Nagoya Betsuin Daishō-ji (Japanese: 大本山成田山名古屋別院大聖寺), also known as Inuyama Naritasan Temple (Japanese: 犬山成田山), is a Shingon Buddhist temple located in Inuyama, Aichi Prefecture, Japan. It is a branch of the famous Naritasan Shinshō-ji in Chiba and is known for its striking red architecture, panoramic views, and blessings for traffic safety.

The principal image of this temple is Acala.

== Gallery ==
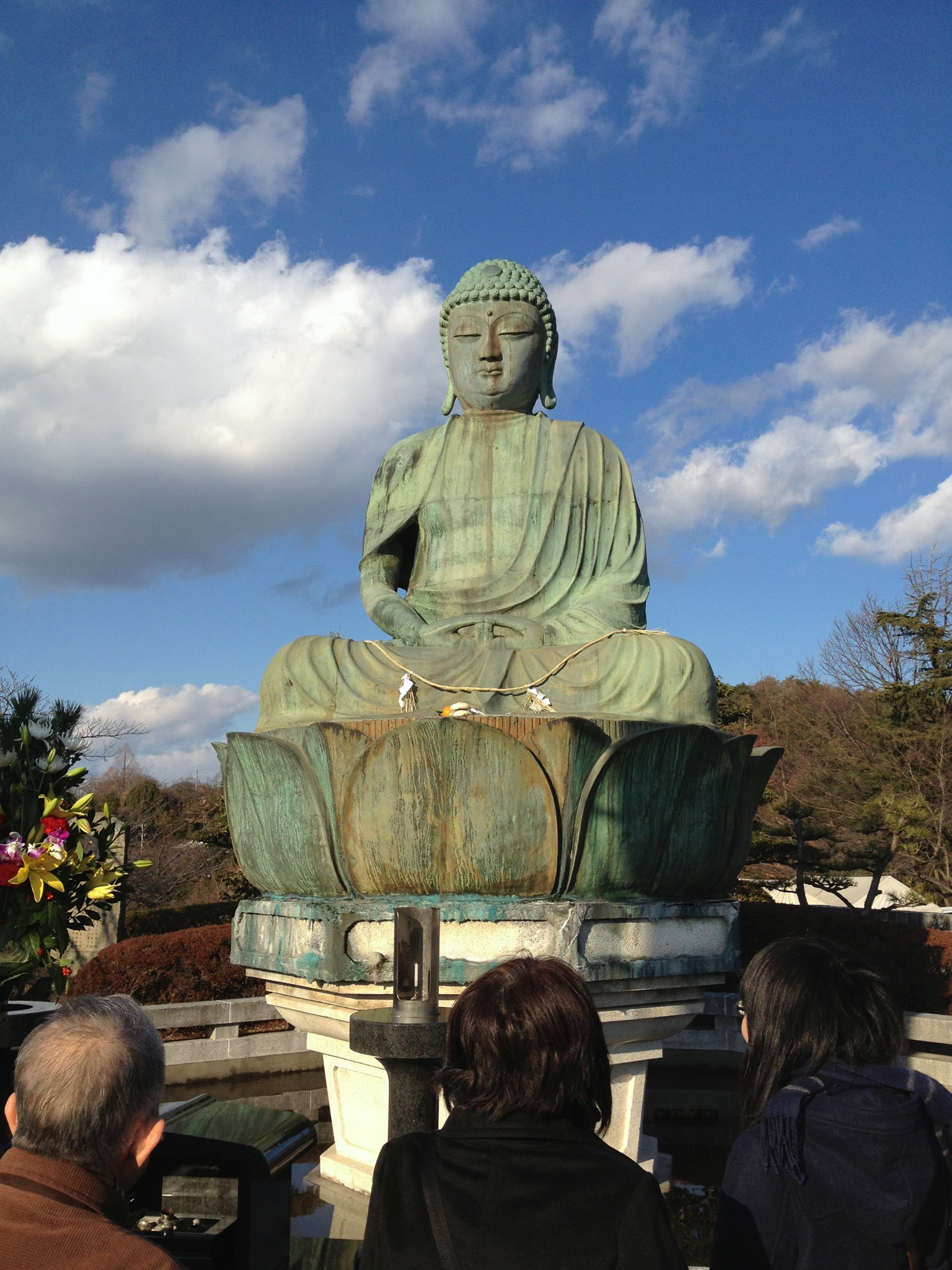
Buddha statue

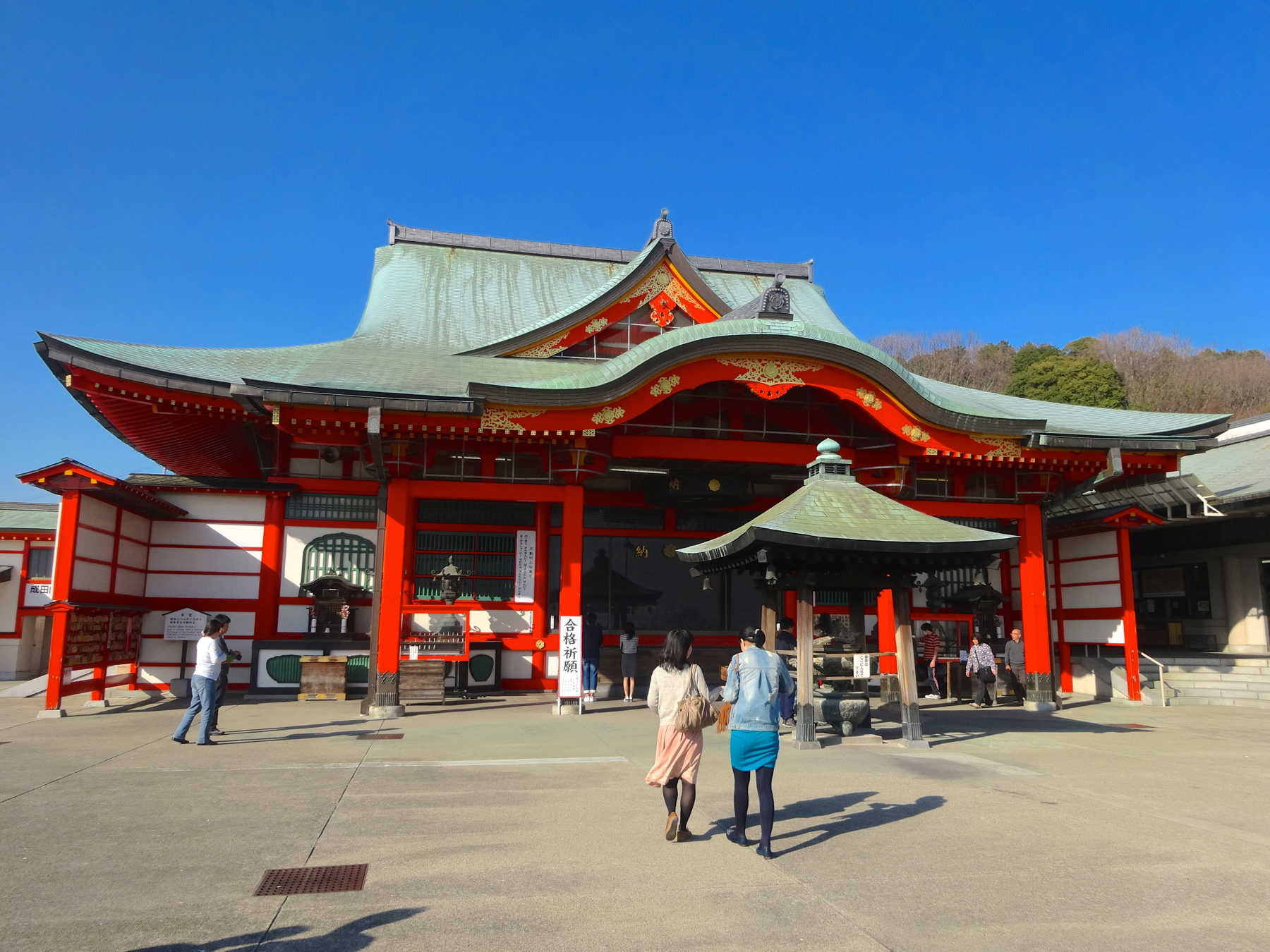
Main temple

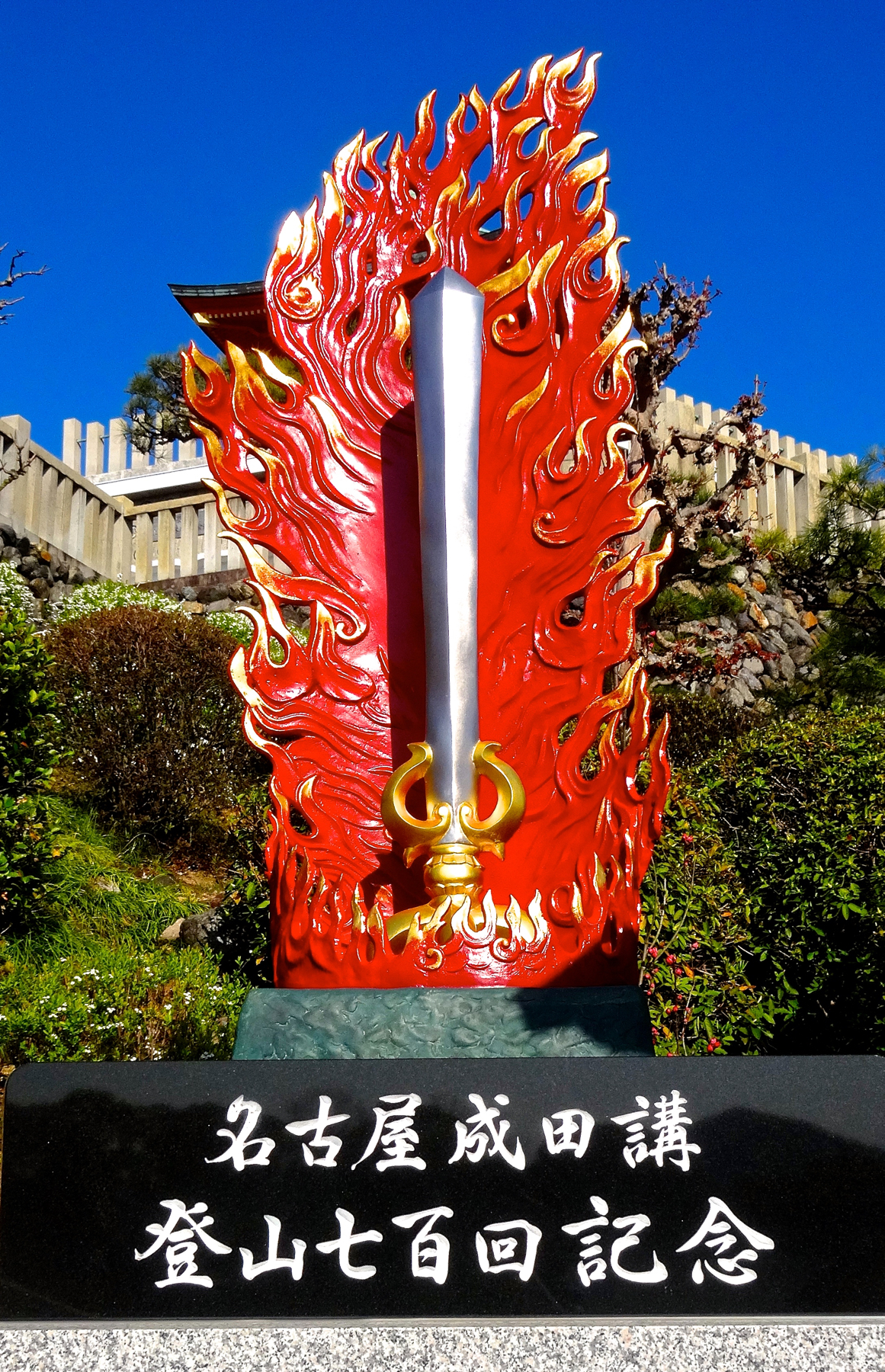
Fire and sword statue

== See also ==
- Media related to Daishō-ji (Inuyama) at Wikimedia Commons
