= Inuyama Bridge =

Coordinates: 35°23′35″N 136°56′45″E

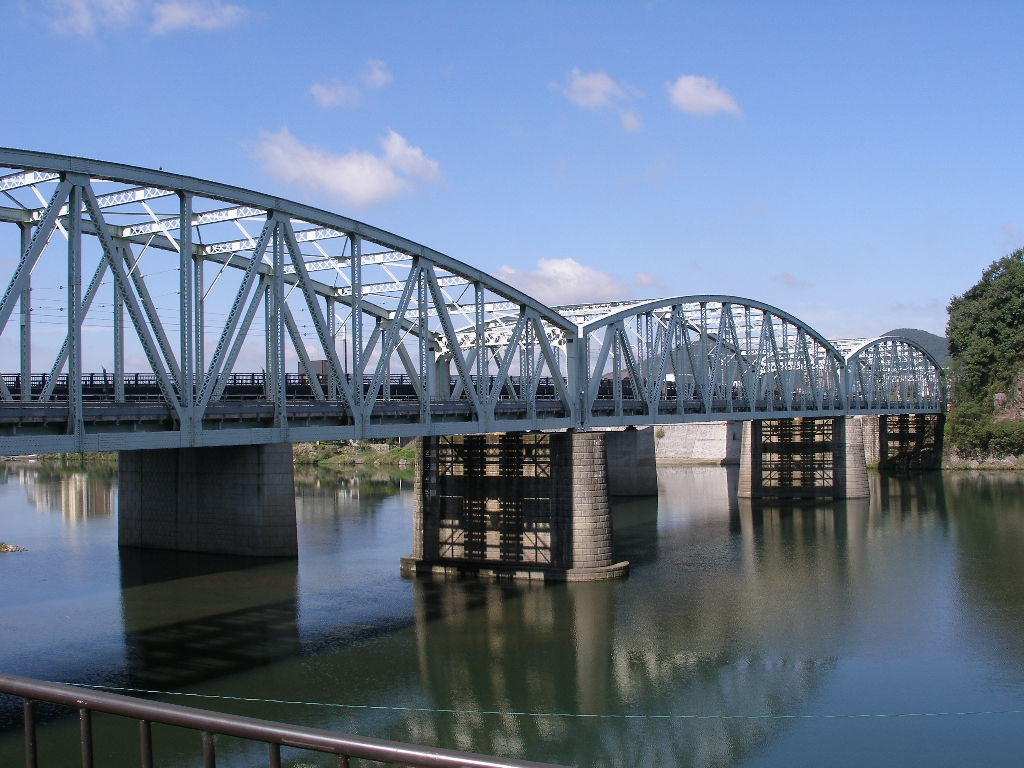
in 2007

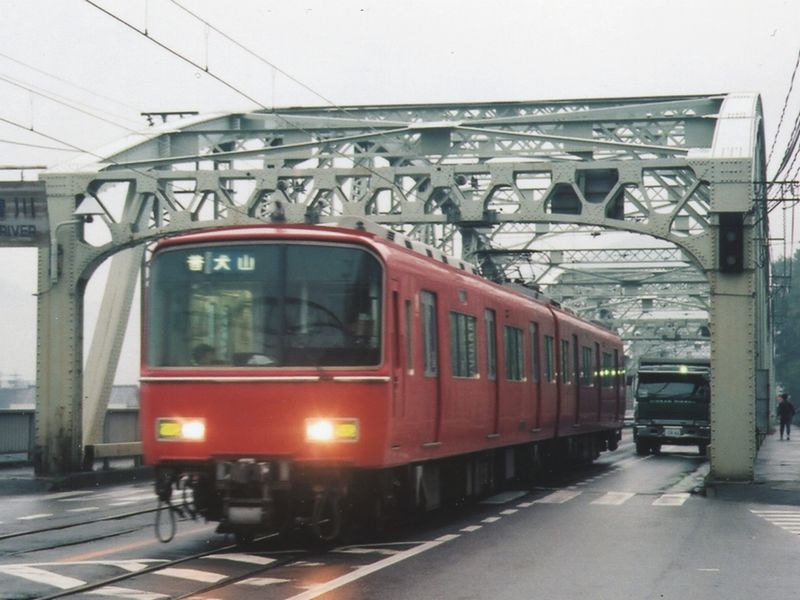
in 1996

The Inuyama Bridge is a bridge over the Kiso River in Japan. It is a laced steel truss bridge which connects Kakamigahara in Gifu Prefecture with Inuyama in Aichi Prefecture. The Meitetsu Inuyama Line runs on it.

This bridge was a road-rail bridge before 2000 when a new road bridge was constructed at the lower stream side (west side) of this bridge.
