= Lake Iruka =

Lake Iruka 入鹿池
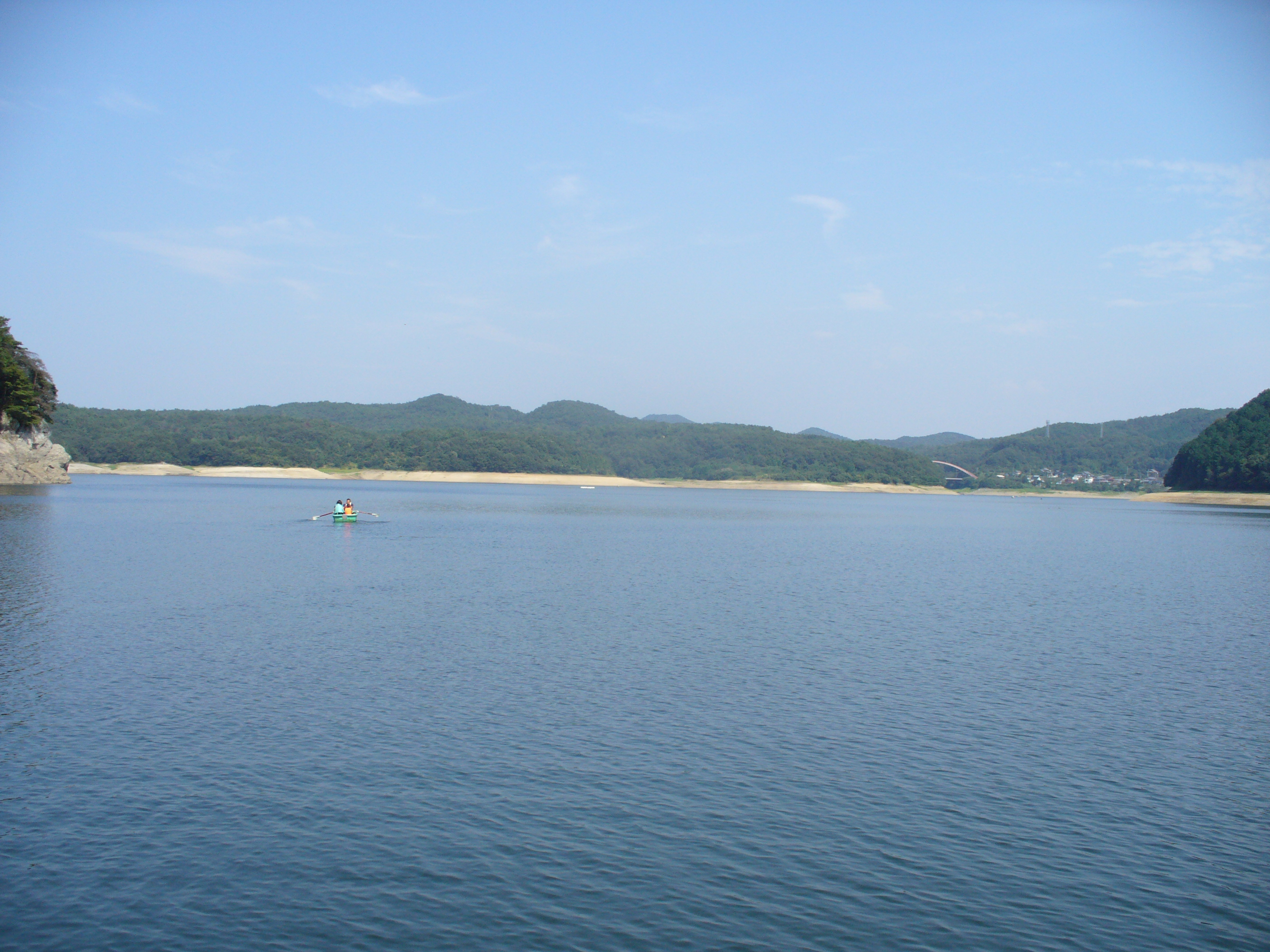

- Location within Aichi Prefecture
- Location: Inuyama, Aichi
- Coordinates: 35°20′30″N 136°59′51″E
- Type: reservoir
- Basin countries: Japan

Lake Iruka (入鹿池, Irukaike) is a reservoir located near the Meiji Mura theme park in Inuyama, Aichi, Japan.

In 1868 the dam holding the reservoir collapsed after heavy rain. In the resulting flood, 941 people died.

On 14 May 2025, a Kawasaki T-4 trainer aircraft of the Japan Air Self-Defense Force crashed into the lake, killing its two occupants.

== Gallery ==
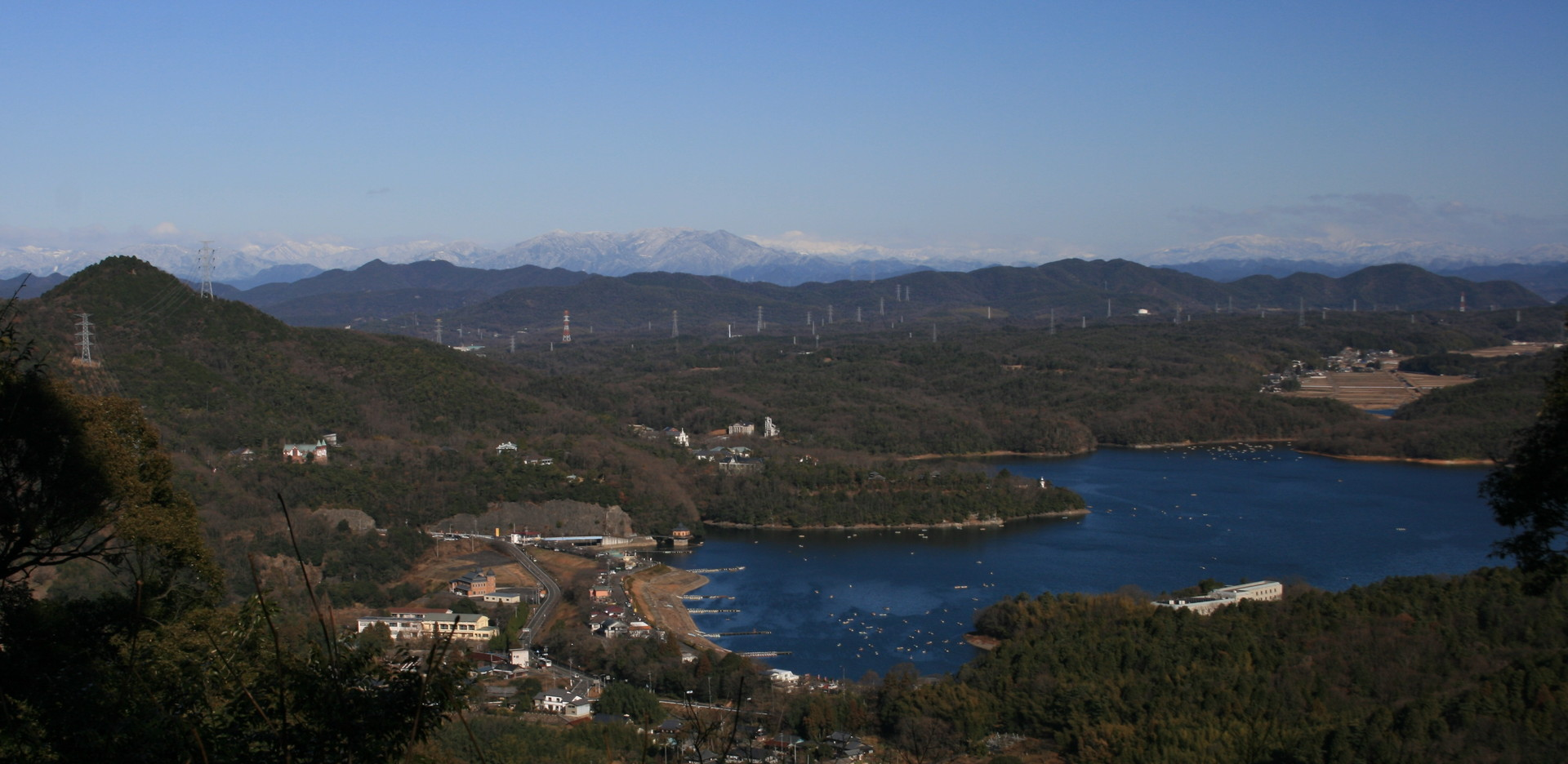
Lake Iruka seen from Mount Owari-Haku

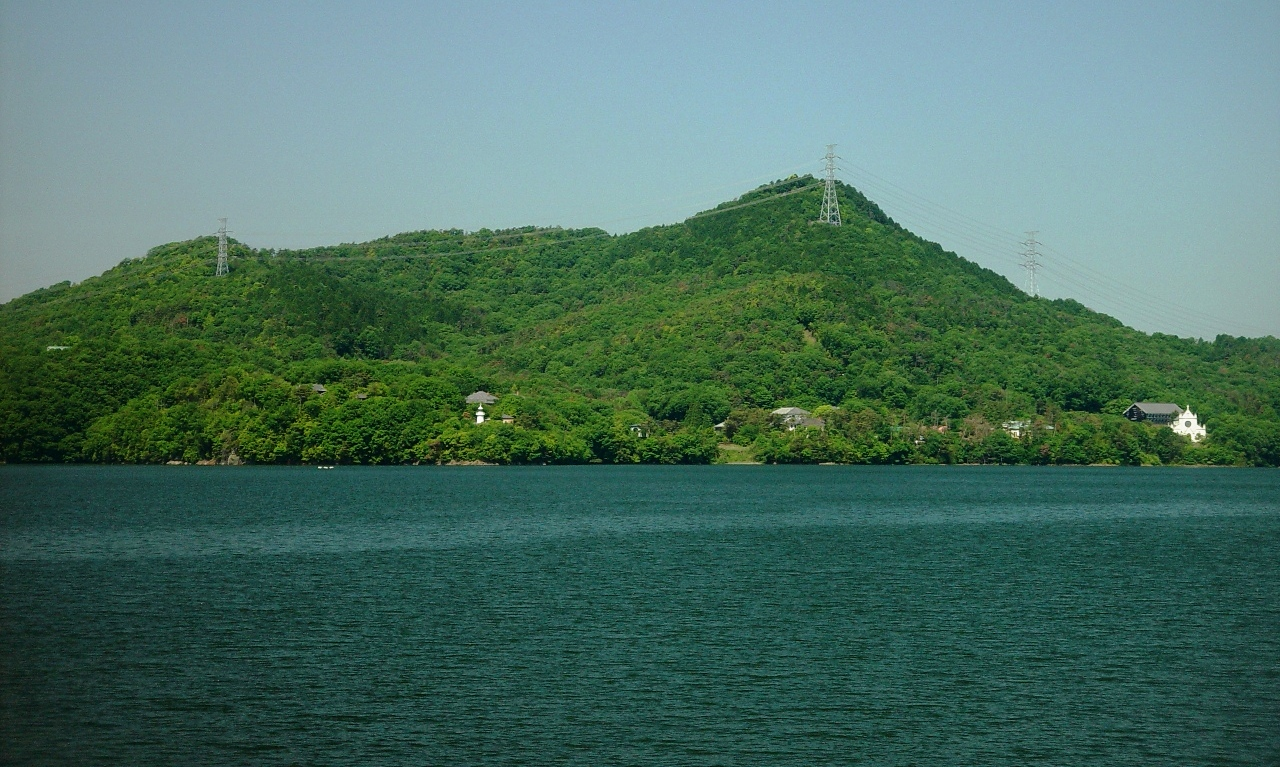
Lake Iruka and Mount Owari-Fuji
