= Inuyama Castle =

Japanese castle

- 犬山城
- Chūbu (Tōkai) Inuyama, Aichi Prefecture, Japan
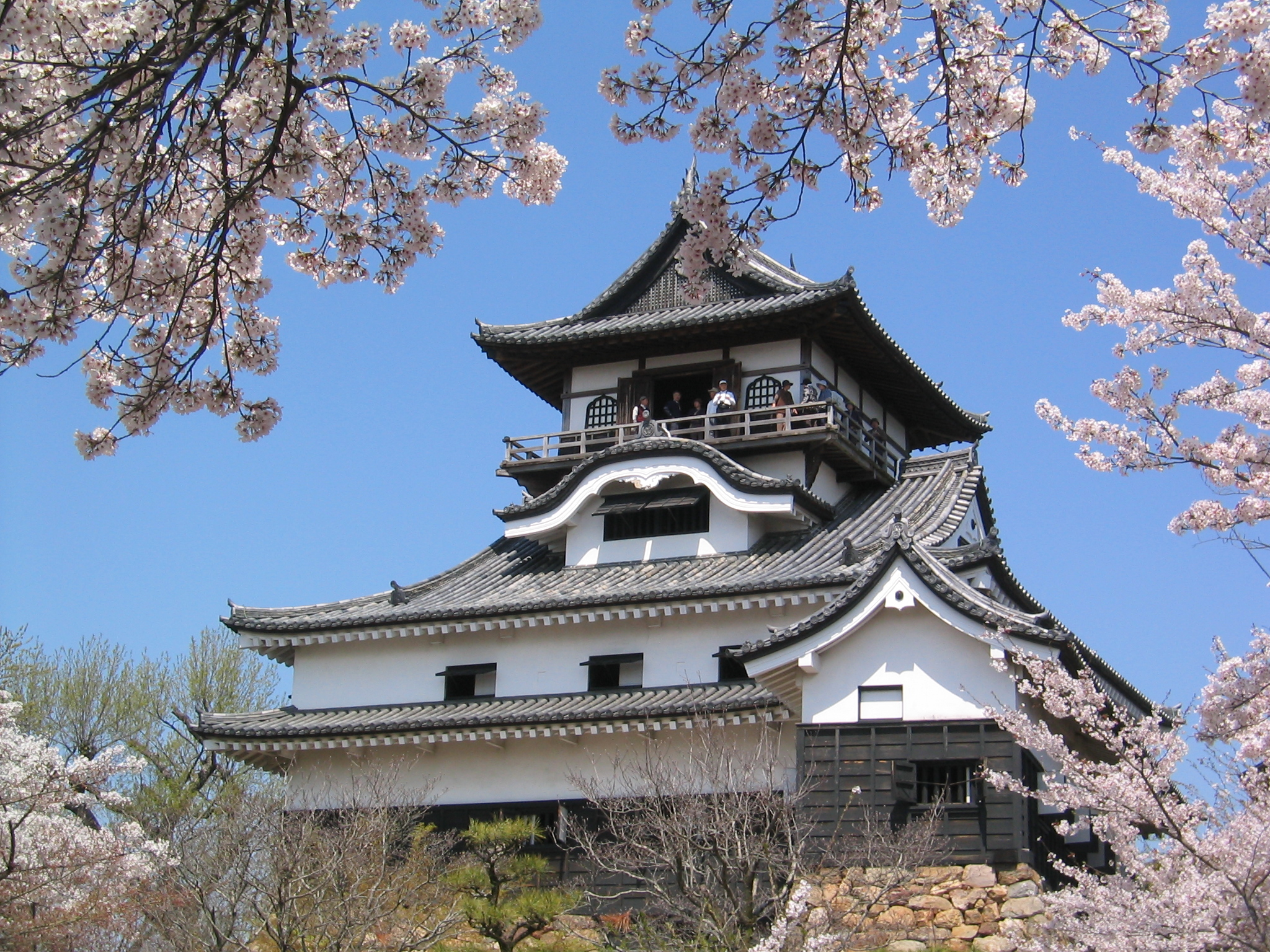
- Tenshu of Inuyama Castle

Location
- Location within Aichi Prefecture Location within Japan
- Coordinates: 35°23′18″N 136°56′21″E
- Height: 19 m (62 ft)

Site history
- Built: 1537
- Built by: Oda Hirochika

Garrison information
- Past commanders: Ikeda Tsuneoki, Oda Nobuyasu
- Occupants: Oda clan, Naruse clan

Inuyama Castle (犬山城, Inuyama-jō) is a hirayama-style Japanese castle located in the city of Inuyama, Aichi Prefecture, Japan. The castle overlooks the Kiso River, which serves as the border between Aichi and Gifu Prefectures. The tenshu of Inuyama Castle, one of only 12 pre-modern tenshu remaining in existence, has been determined to be one of the oldest remaining tenshu, although Maruoka Castle also makes this claim. The castle has been a National Historic Site since 2018.

== Background ==
Inuyama Castle is located on a hill overlooking the Kiso River in what is now the city of Inuyama. Inuyama Castle is a candidate for having the oldest of twelve intact Tenshukaku. The Japanese government's Cultural Affairs Online site lists the tenshu as dating to 1601, though there is evidence of it having been modified thereafter, and the larger castle (as opposed to the tenshu) dates back to 1537. Its main tower is small but due to its complex form, it shows different silhouettes depending on the angle. Among the 12 remaining main towers, the tenshu at Inuyama Castle is designated as a National Treasure of Japan, as are Matsumoto Castle, Hikone Castle, Matsue, and Himeji Castle. Additionally, it is the only one of the 5 National Treasure tenshu where visitors can walk 360 degrees around the cornice.

== History ==
According to the Heian period Engishiki a Shinto shrine, the Haritsuna Shrine was moved to make way for the castle. The structure was rebuilt several times in the Muromachi period and the current configuration was largely the work of Oda Nobukatsu, Oda Nobunaga's son. The antiquated architectural style of the watchtower atop the tenshu has in the past led many historians to believe this to be the oldest extant tenshu in Japan, which was confirmed through tree rings in the construction materials dating the structure to the 1580s. Construction and renovations continued through 1620.

Inuyama Castle was the final obstacle against Oda Nobunaga's unification of Owari Province. After Nobunaga had defeated the Imagawa clan at the Battle of Okehazama in 1560, his cousin, Oda Nobukiyo, seized Inuyama Castle with the support of Saito Yoshitatsu on Mino Province. Nobunaga recaptured the castle in 1564. After Nobunaga's death, Toyotomi Hideyoshi appointed Ishikawa Sadakiyo as castellan of Inuyama. Ishikawa rebuilt the defenses of the castle in line with contemporary designs and the current shape of the donjon is a result of this reconstruction. After the Battle of Sekigahara, the victorious Tokugawa Ieyasu expelled the Ishikawa clan and turned the castle over to Owari Domain.

Under the Tokugawa shogunate, the castle was governed by the Naruse clan, who ruled as daimyō of Inuyama Domain as vassals of the Owari Tokugawa clan until the Meiji restoration. The new Meiji government seized Inuyama Castle in 1871 and destroyed all of its auxiliary buildings except for the tenshu; however, after the castle was damaged in the Great Nōbi earthquake, and it was returned to the Naruse family in 1895, on the condition that they repair and maintain it. The castle was thus unique in Japan in that it was privately owned.

In 2004, ownership of the castle was turned over to a non-profit foundation set up by the Aichi Prefecture's Board of Education.

It was long believed that the tenshu of Inuyama Castle was moved to the castle from Kanayama Castle in 1599, until such theory was disproved as a result of examination through a large scale restoration work, involving the dismantling of the tenshu, carried out between 1961 and 1965.

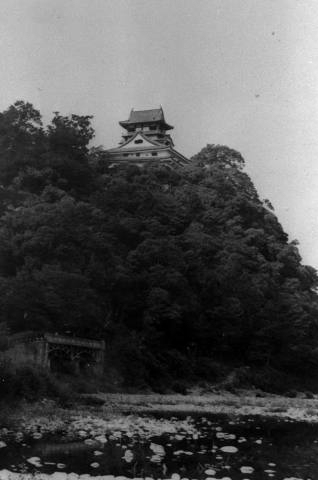
A view of the castle, taken in 1937

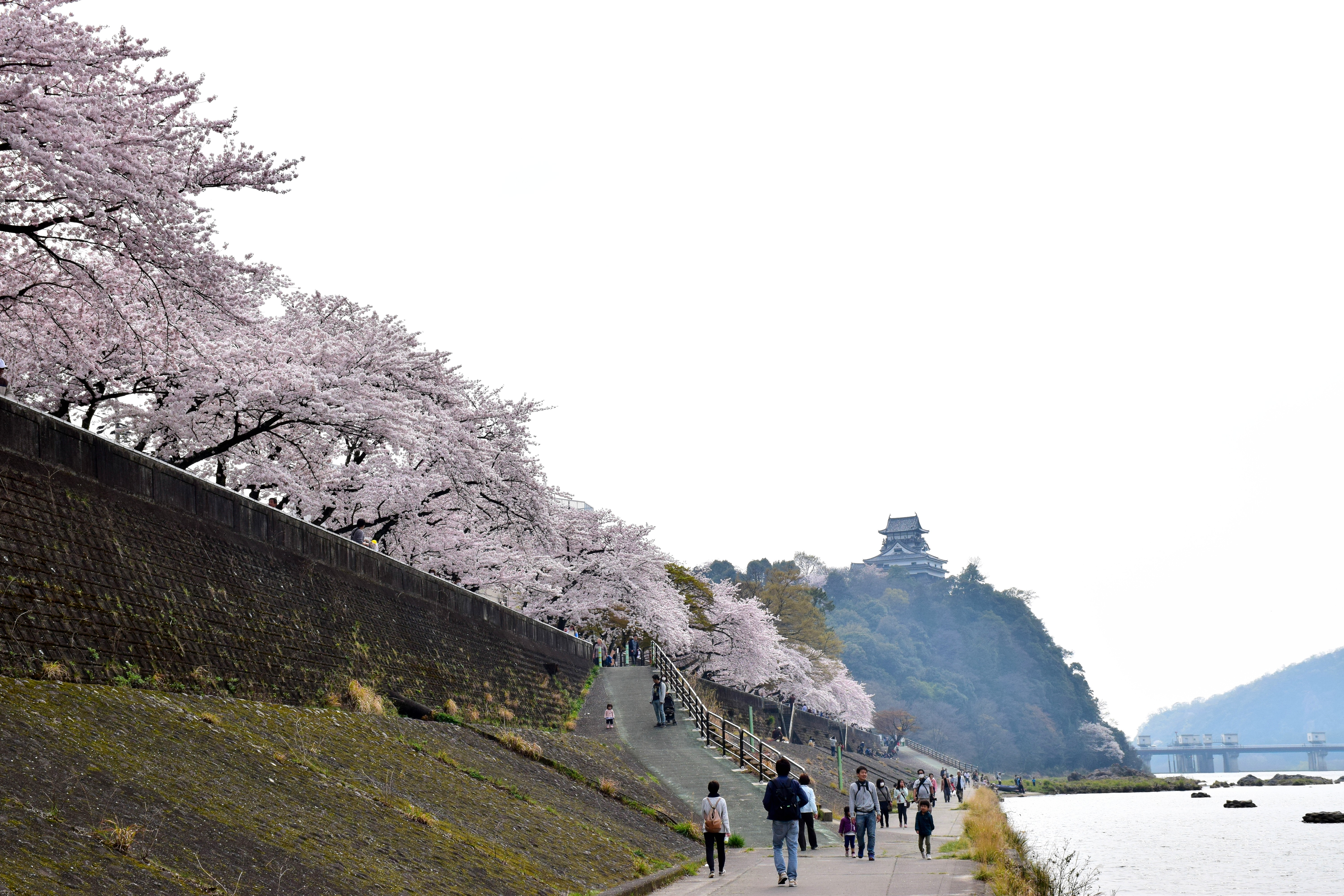
Inuyama Castle and Kiso River

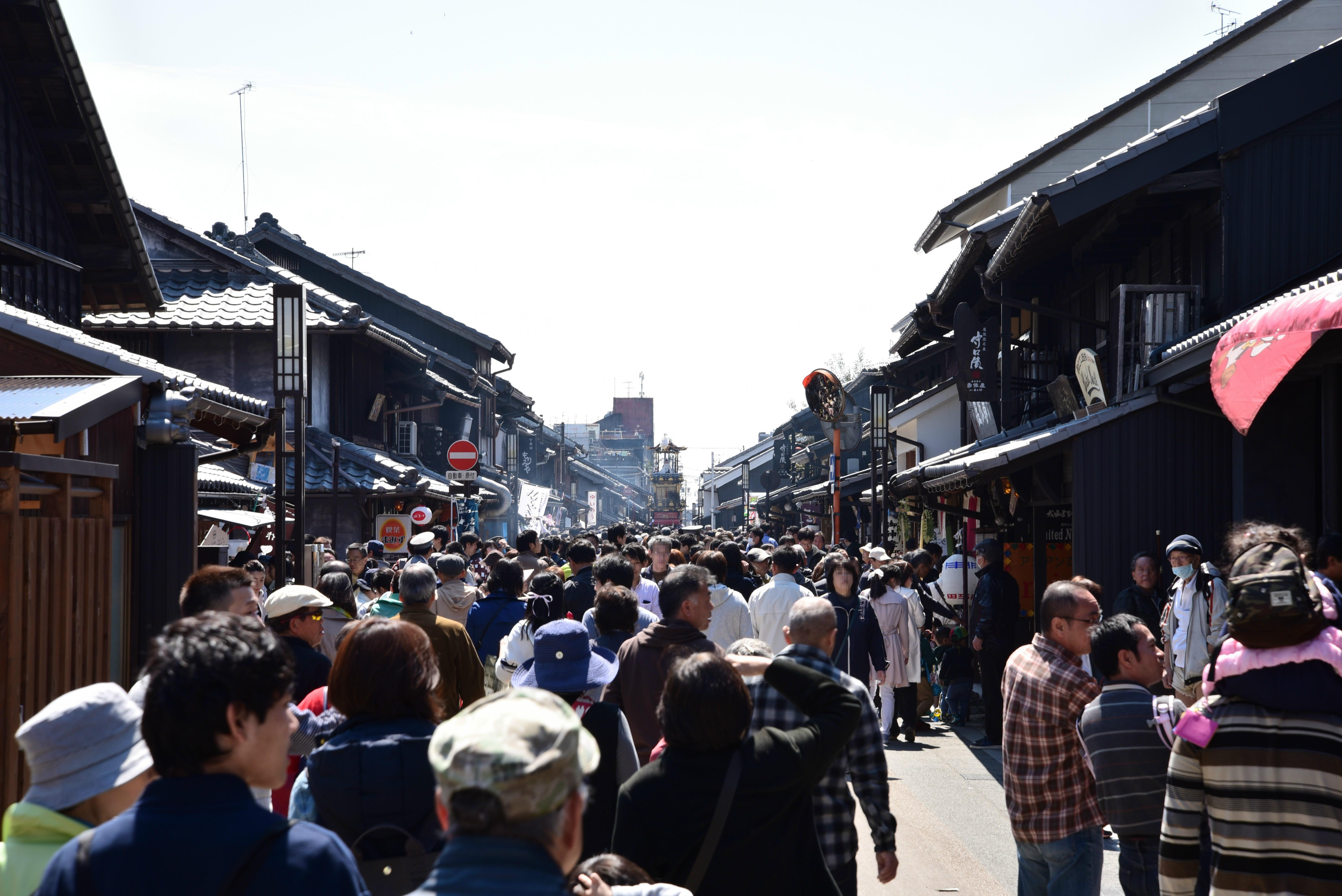
Castle Town

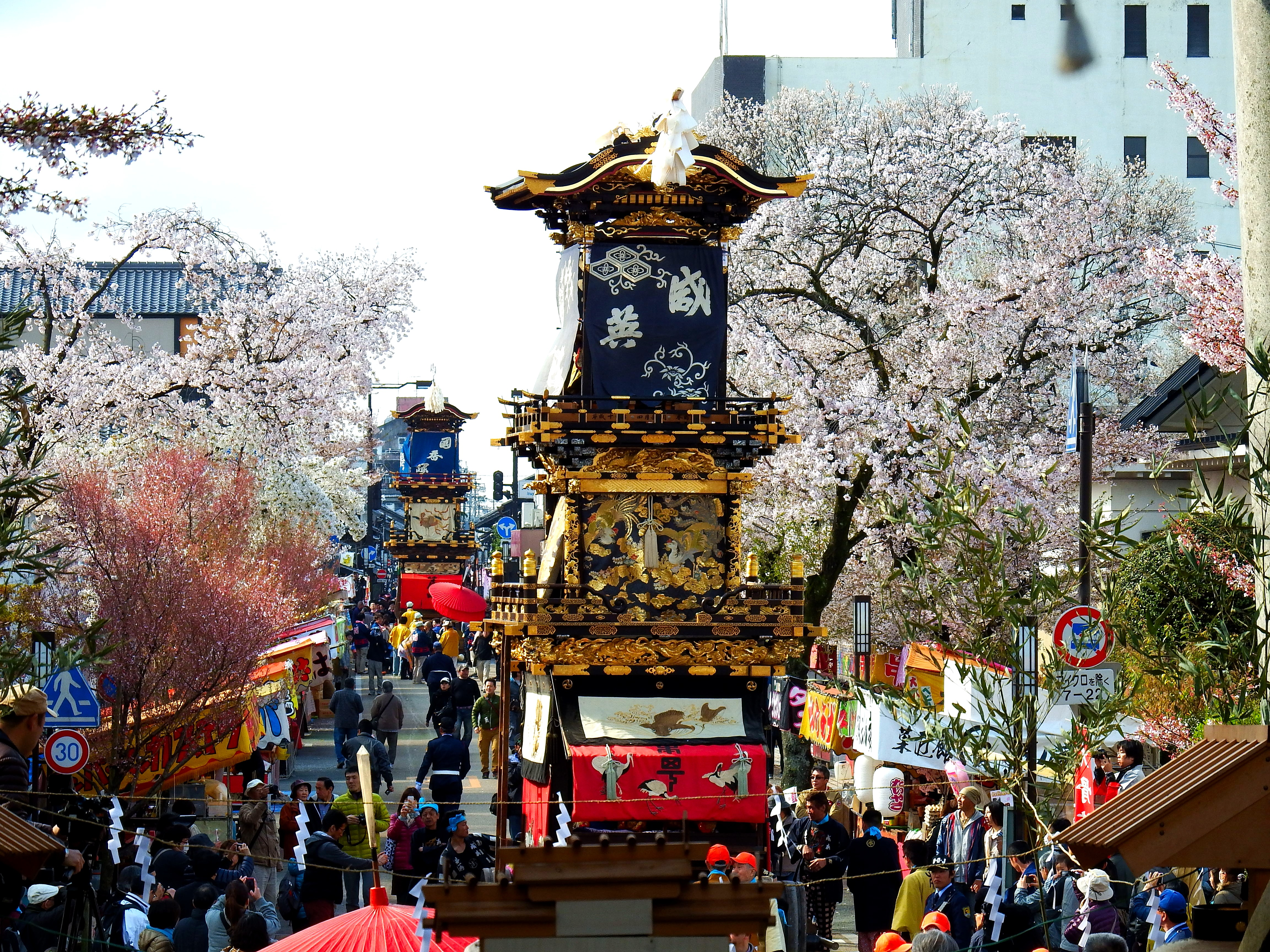
Inuyama Festival

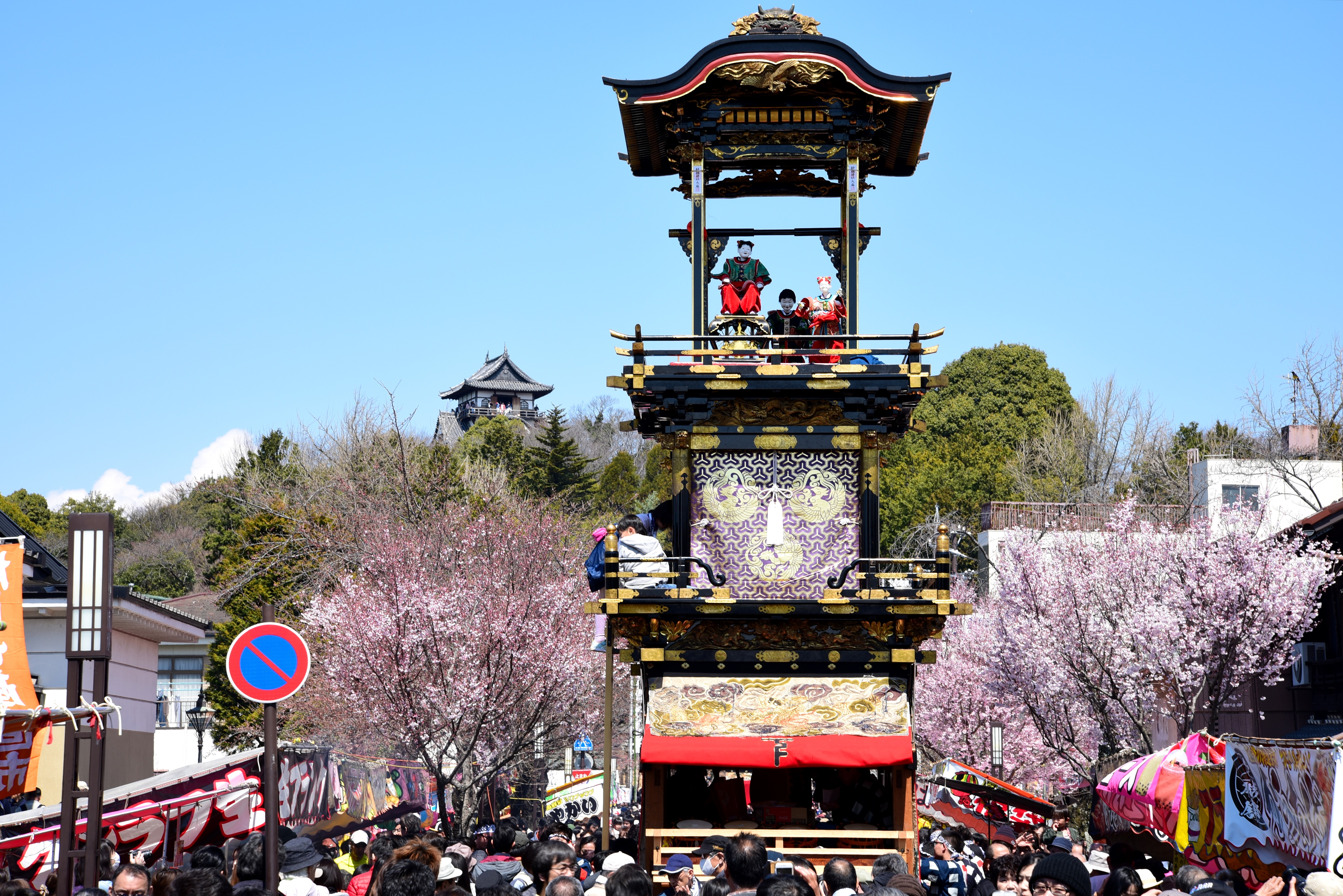
Inuyama Castle and karakuri float

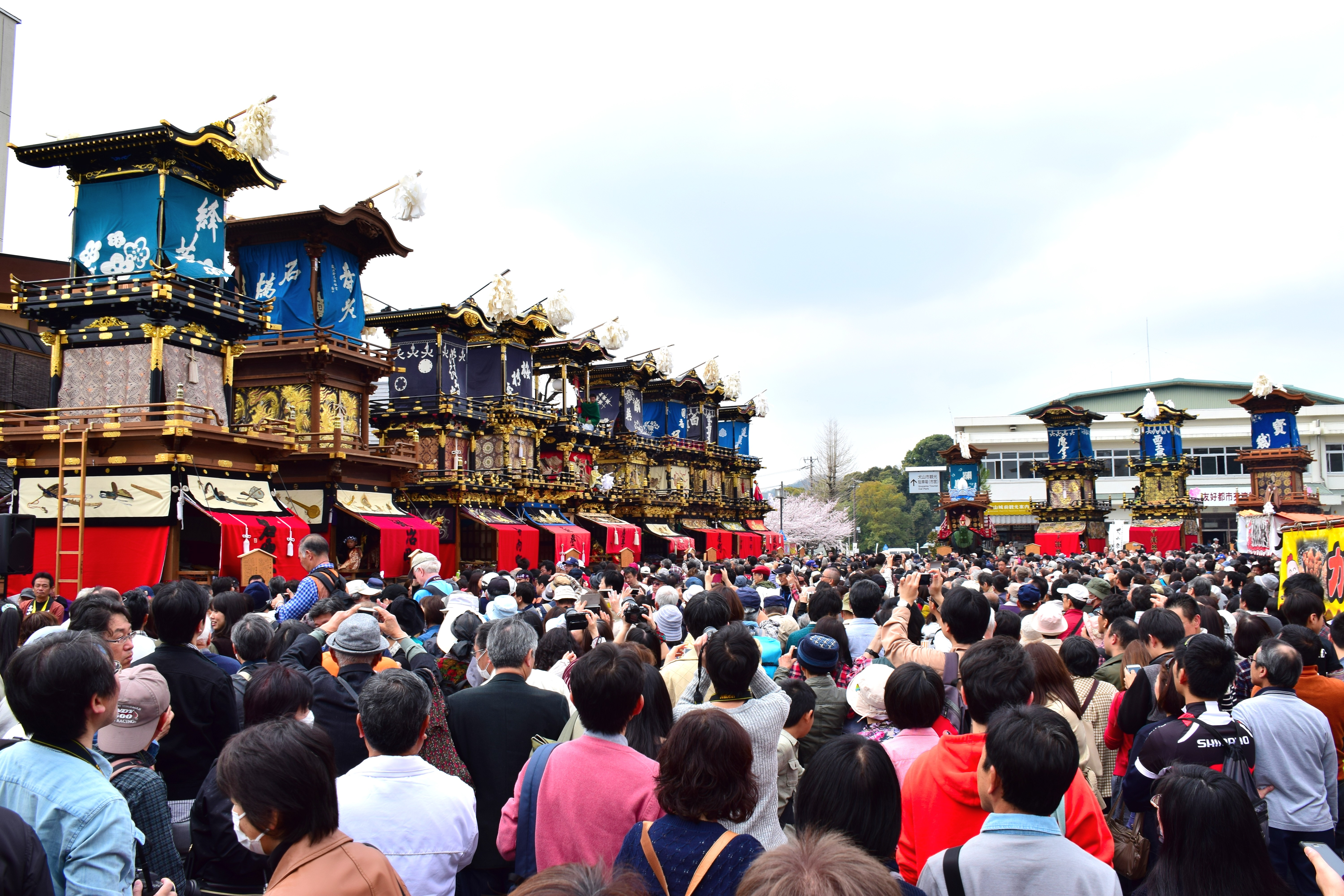
Karakuri float

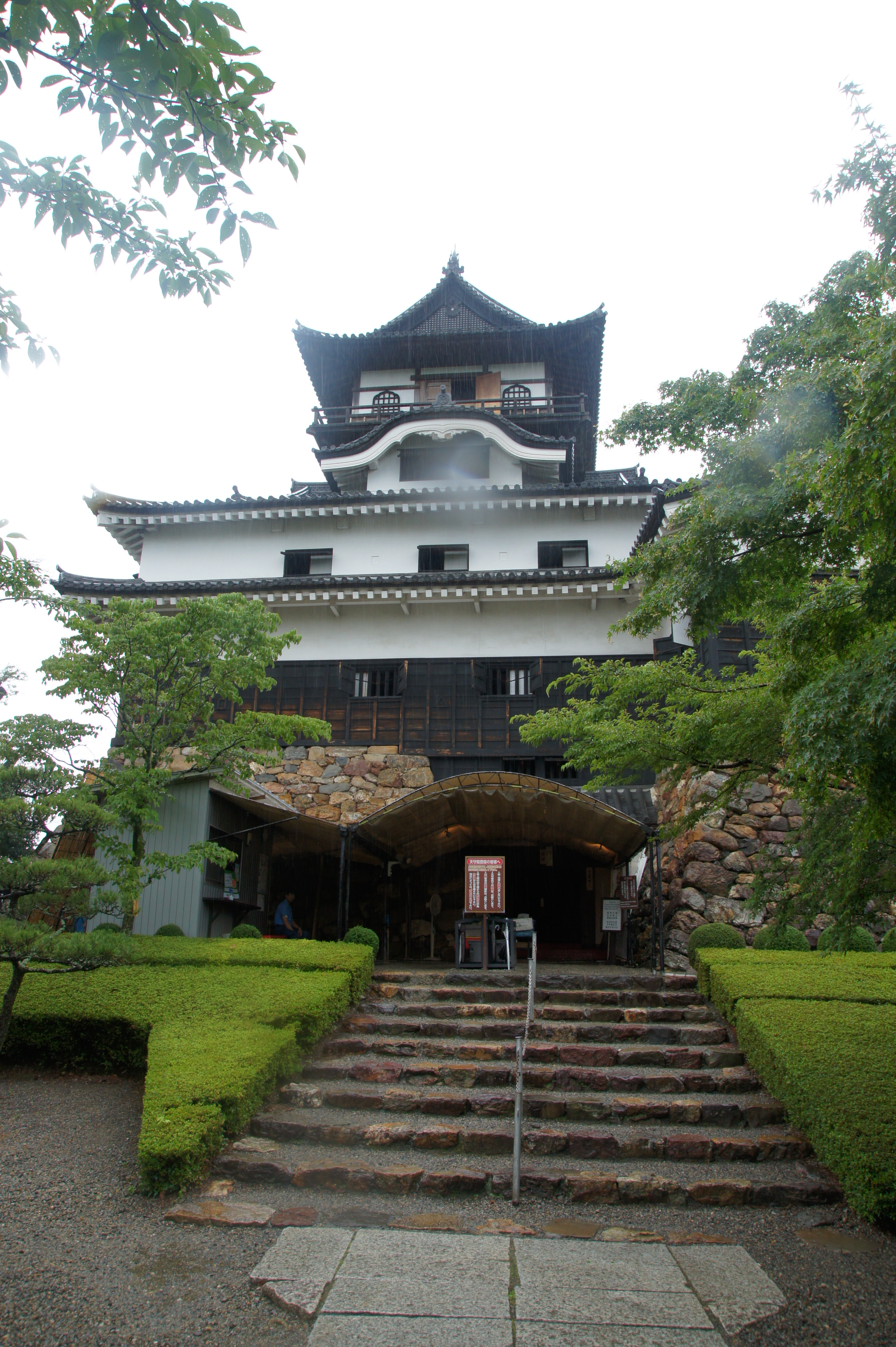
Tenshu front entrance

== Castle Rulers ==
The castellans of Inuyama Castle are listed below in order with their dates of reign in parentheses. There were no castellans from 1612–1617 and 1869–1895.

- Pre-Naruse Clan
1. Oda Nobuyasu (1537–1547)
2. Oda Nobukiyo (1547–1564)
3. Ikeda Tsuneoki (1570–1581)
4. Oda Nobufusa (1581–1582)
5. Nakagawa Sadanari (1582–1584)
6. Ikeda Tsuneoki (1584)
7. Katō Yasukage (1584, proxy ruler)
8. Takeda Kiyotoshi (1584–1587, proxy ruler)
9. Hijikata Katsuyoshi (1587–1590, proxy ruler)
10. Nagao Yoshifusa (1590–1592, proxy ruler)
11. Miwa Gorōemon (1592–1595)
12. Ishikawa Mitsuyoshi (1595–1600)
13. Ogasawara Yoshitsugu (1601–1607)
14. Hiraiwa Chikayoshi (1607–1612)
- Naruse Clan
1. Naruse Masanari (1617–1625)
2. Naruse Masatora (1625–1659)
3. Naruse Masachika (1659–1703)
4. Naruse Masayuki (1703–1732)
5. Naruse Masamoto (1732–1768)
6. Naruse Masanori (1768–1809)
7. Naruse Masanaga (1809–1838)
8. Naruse Masazumi (1838–1857)
9. Naruse Masamitsu (1857–1869, 1895–1903)
10. Naruse Masao (1903–1949)
11. Naruse Masakatsu (1949–1973)
12. Naruse Masatoshi (1973–2004)

== See also ==
- List of National Treasures of Japan (castles)
- List of Historic Sites of Japan (Aichi)

== Literature ==
- De Lange, William (2021). An Encyclopedia of Japanese Castles. Groningen: Toyo Press. pp. 600 pages. ISBN 978-9492722300.
