= Inuyama, Aichi =

Inuyama 犬山市
- City
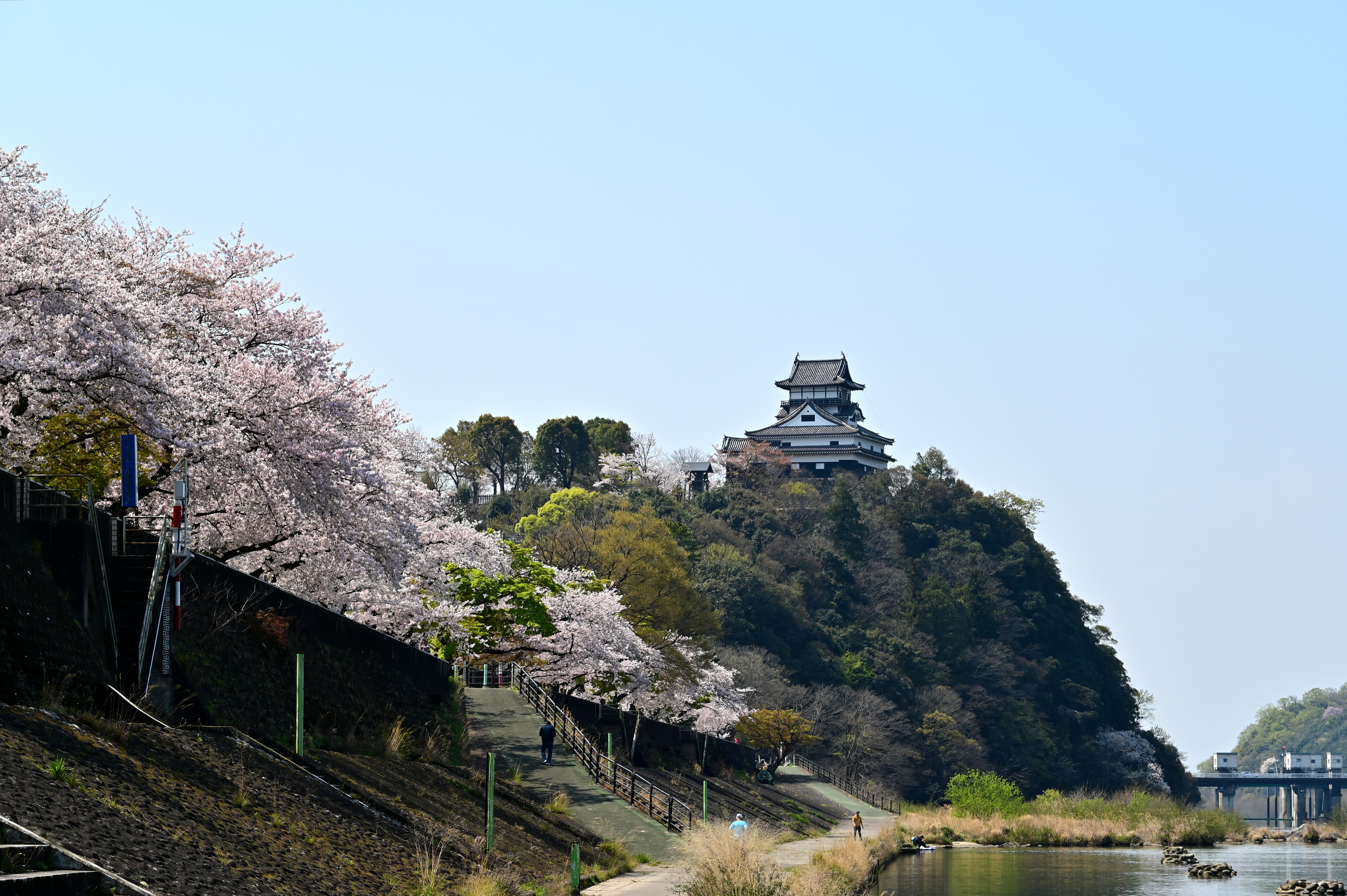
- Inuyama Castle

- Flag Emblem

- Location of Inuyama in Aichi Prefecture

- Coordinates: 35°22′43″N 136°56′40.2″E
- Country: Japan
- Region: Chūbu (Tōkai)
- Prefecture: Aichi
- First official recorded: 3 BC
- City Settled: April 1, 1954

Government
  - Mayor: Takuro Yamada (from 2014)

Area
  - Total: 74.90 km^{2} (28.92 sq mi)

Population (October 1, 2019)
  - Total: 73,420
  - Density: 980.2/km^{2} (2,539/sq mi)
- Time zone: UTC+9 (Japan Standard Time)
- Tree: Chinese hawthorn
- Flower: Sakura
- Phone number: 0568-61-1800
- Address: 36 Higashihata, Inuyama, Inuyama-shi, Aichi-ken 484-0081
- Website: Official website

Inuyama (犬山市, Inuyama-shi; Japanese pronunciation: [ì.nɨ́.jä́.mä́(.ɕì)]) is a city in Aichi Prefecture, Japan. As of 1 October 2019, the city had an estimated population of 73,420 in 31,276 households, and a population density of 980 persons per km^{2}. The total area of the city is 74.90 square kilometres (28.92 sq mi). The name of the city literally translates to "Dog Mountain". The name appears in historical records from 1336, but its origin is unknown.

== Geography ==
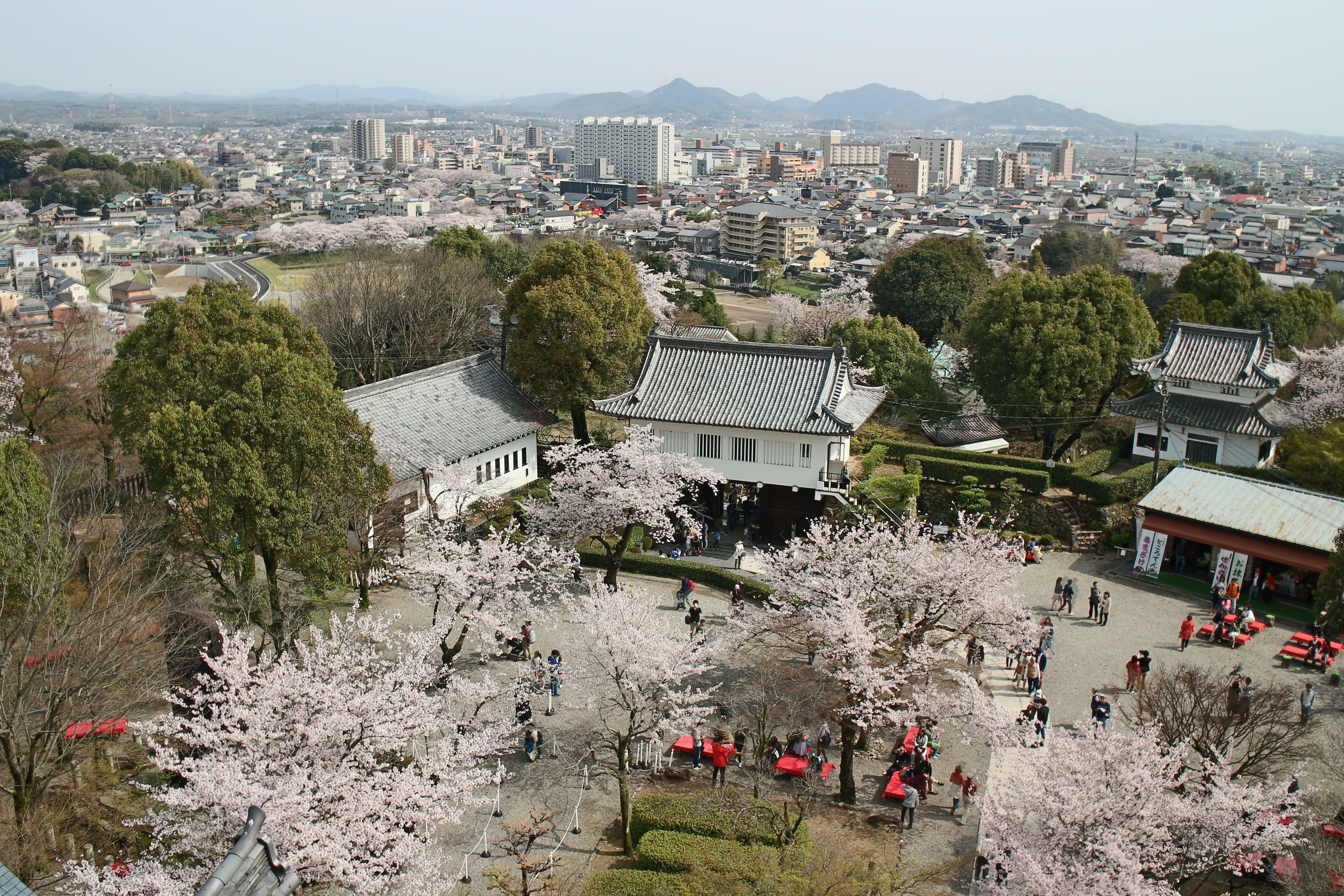
Inuyama skyline

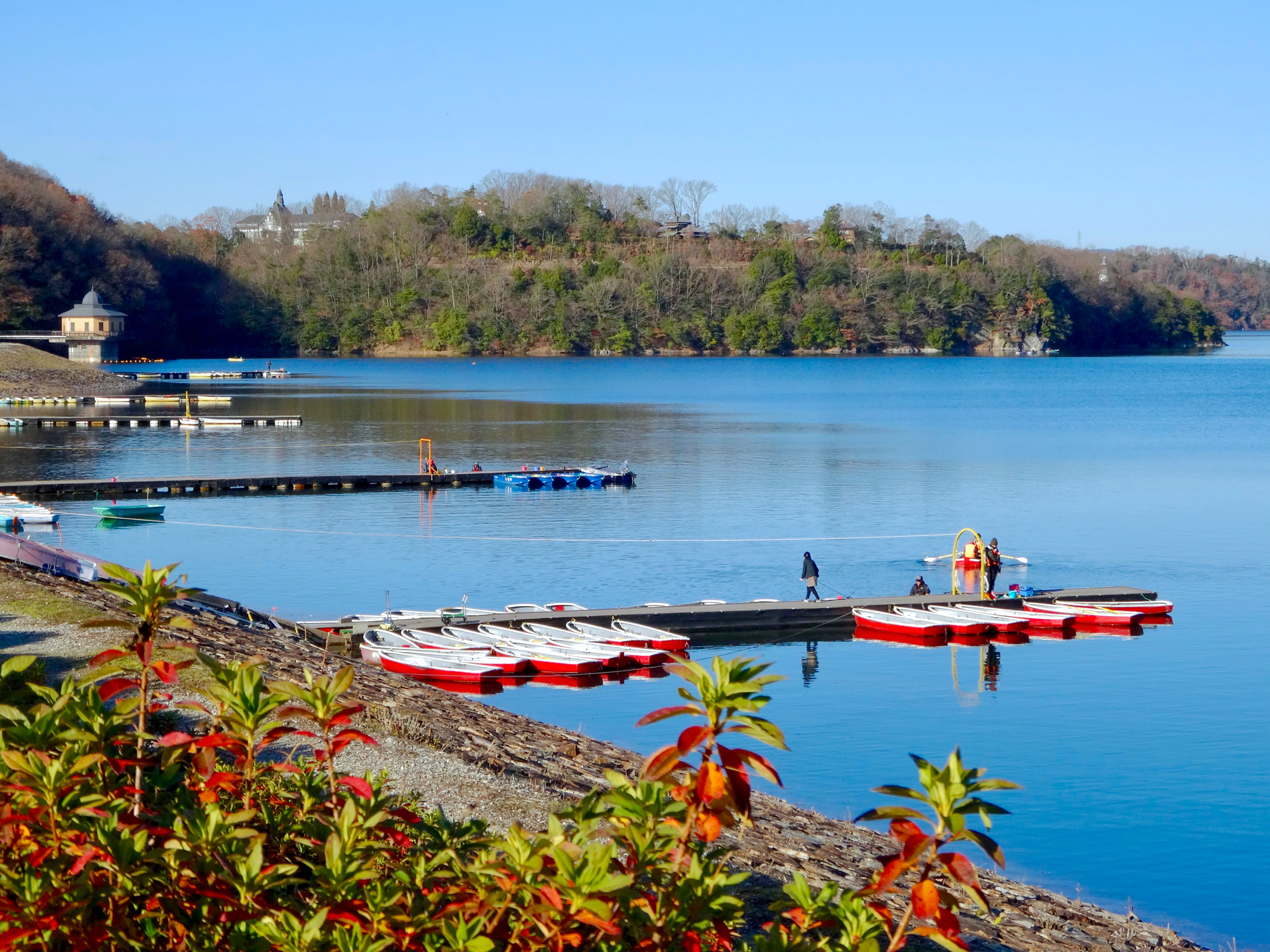
Lake Iruka and Meiji-mura

Inuyama lies along the northwestern edge of Aichi Prefecture, separated from neighboring Gifu Prefecture by the Kiso River.

=== Climate ===
The city has a climate characterized by hot and humid summers, and relatively mild winters (Köppen climate classification Cfa). The average annual temperature in Inuyama is 15.1 °C. The average annual rainfall is 1910 mm with September as the wettest month. The temperatures are highest on average in August, at around 27.6 °C, and lowest in January, at around 3.4 °C.

=== Demographics ===
Per Japanese census data, the population of Inuyama has been increasing over the past 70 years.

Historical population
Year	Pop.	±%
1940	26,079	—
1950	35,145	+34.8%
1960	38,202	+8.7%
1970	50,594	+32.4%
1980	64,614	+27.7%
1990	69,801	+8.0%
2000	72,583	+4.0%
2010	75,151	+3.5%

=== Surrounding municipalities ===
Aichi Prefecture

- Fuso
- Kasugai
- Komaki
- Oguchi

Gifu Prefecture

- Kakamigahara
- Kani
- Sakahogi
- Tajimi

== History ==
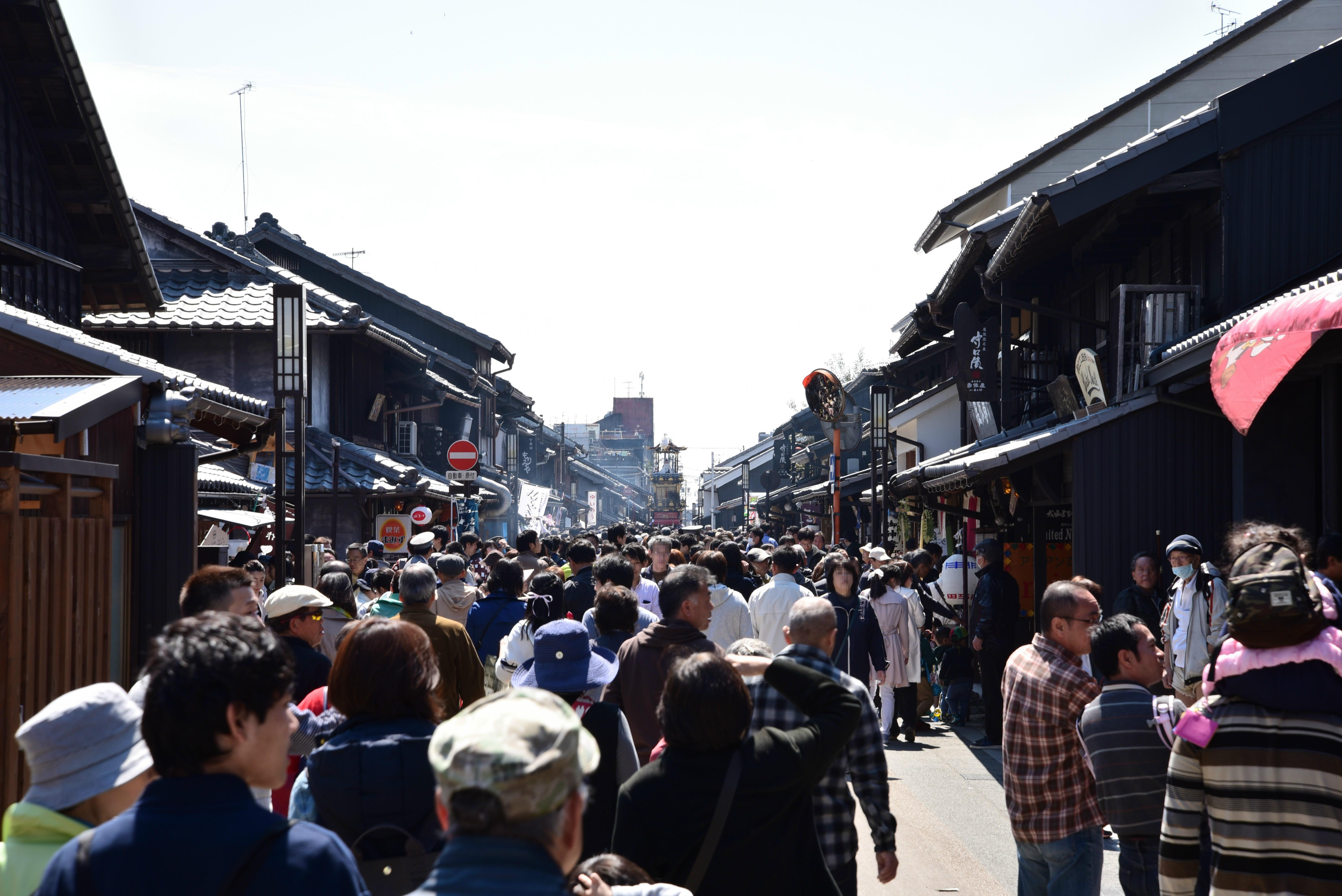
Inuyama Old Town

=== Early modern period ===
The area around Inuyama was settled from prehistoric times. During the Sengoku period, part of the Battle of Komaki and Nagakute was fought in what is now Inuyama, and the Oda clan rebuilt a pre-existing fortification into Inuyama Castle.

Under the Edo period Tokugawa shogunate, Inuyama was ruled as a sub-domain of Owari Domain, entrusted to the Naruse clan, who served as senior retainers of the Nagoya-branch of the Tokugawa clan.

=== Late modern period ===
Immediately following the Meiji Restoration in 1868, Inuyama was established as an independent feudal han, until the 1871 abolition of the han system. With the establishment of the modern municipalities system on October 1, 1889, the town of Inuyama was created.

=== Contemporary history ===
Inuyama Castle was designated as a national treasure in 1935 and again in 1952.

Inuyama merged with four neighboring villages to form the city of Inuyama on April 1, 1954.

In 2016, the Inuyama Festival was proclaimed an Intangible cultural heritage by UNESCO.

== Government ==
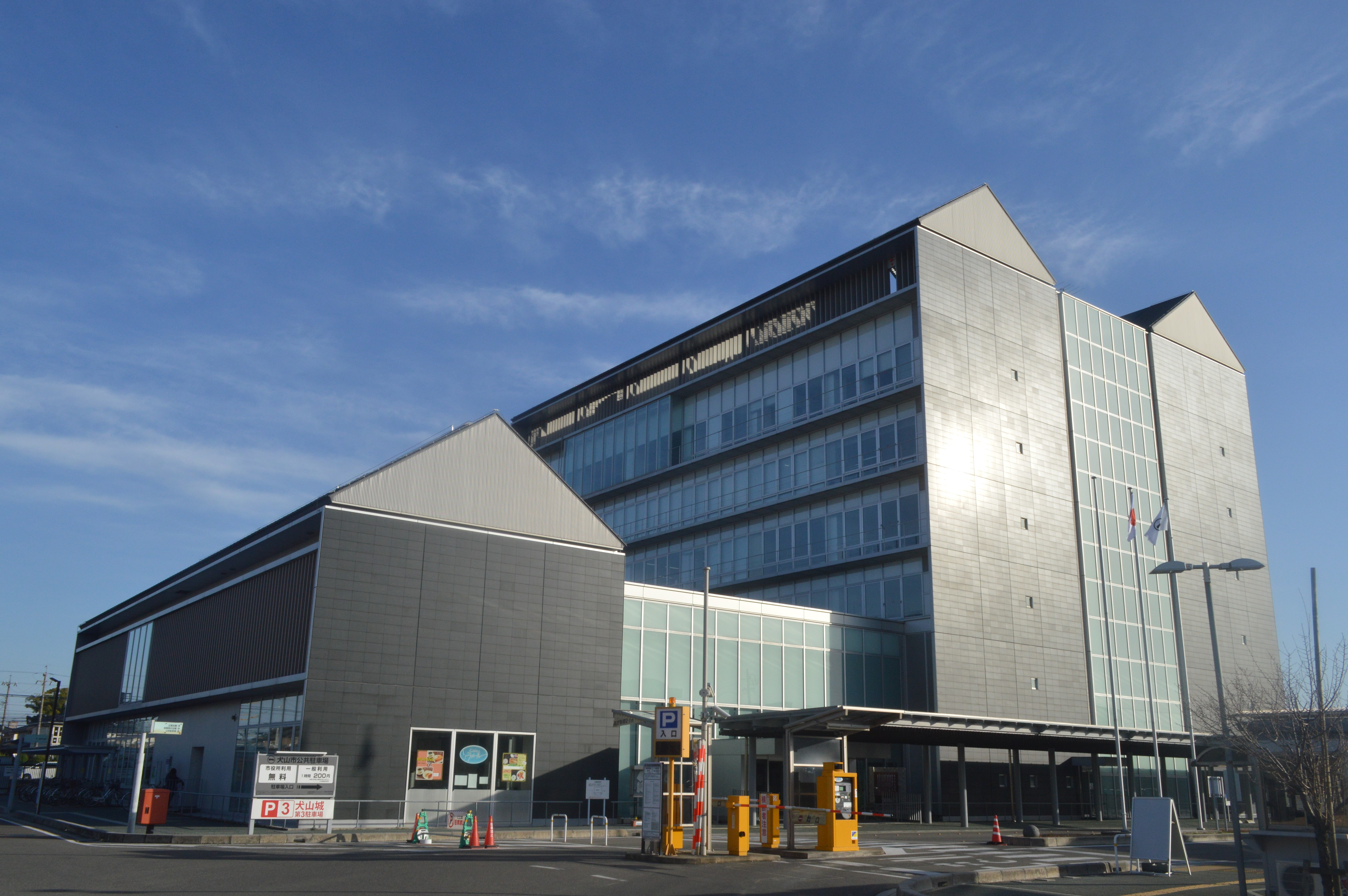
Inuyama City Hall

Inuyama has a mayor-council form of government with a directly elected mayor and a unicameral city legislature of 20 members. The city contributes one member to the Aichi Prefectural Assembly. In terms of national politics, the city is part of Aichi 16th district of the lower house of the Diet of Japan.

== Sister cities ==
Inuyama is twinned with:

=== International ===
Sister cities

- Davis, California, United States, since February 3, 2001
- Haman, South Gyeongsang Province, South Korea, since February 18, 2014

Friendship cities

- Xiangyang, Hubei, China, since March 3, 1983
- Sankt Goarshausen, Rhineland-Palatinate, Germany, since June 1, 1992

=== National ===
Sister cities

- (Japan) Tateyama, Toyama Prefecture, since October 16, 1973
- (Japan) Nichinan, Miyazaki Prefecture, since August 10, 2000
- (Japan) Kakamigahara, Gifu Prefecture, since August 23, 2011
- (Japan) Tamba-Sasayama, Hyōgo Prefecture, since April 1, 2014

== Economy ==
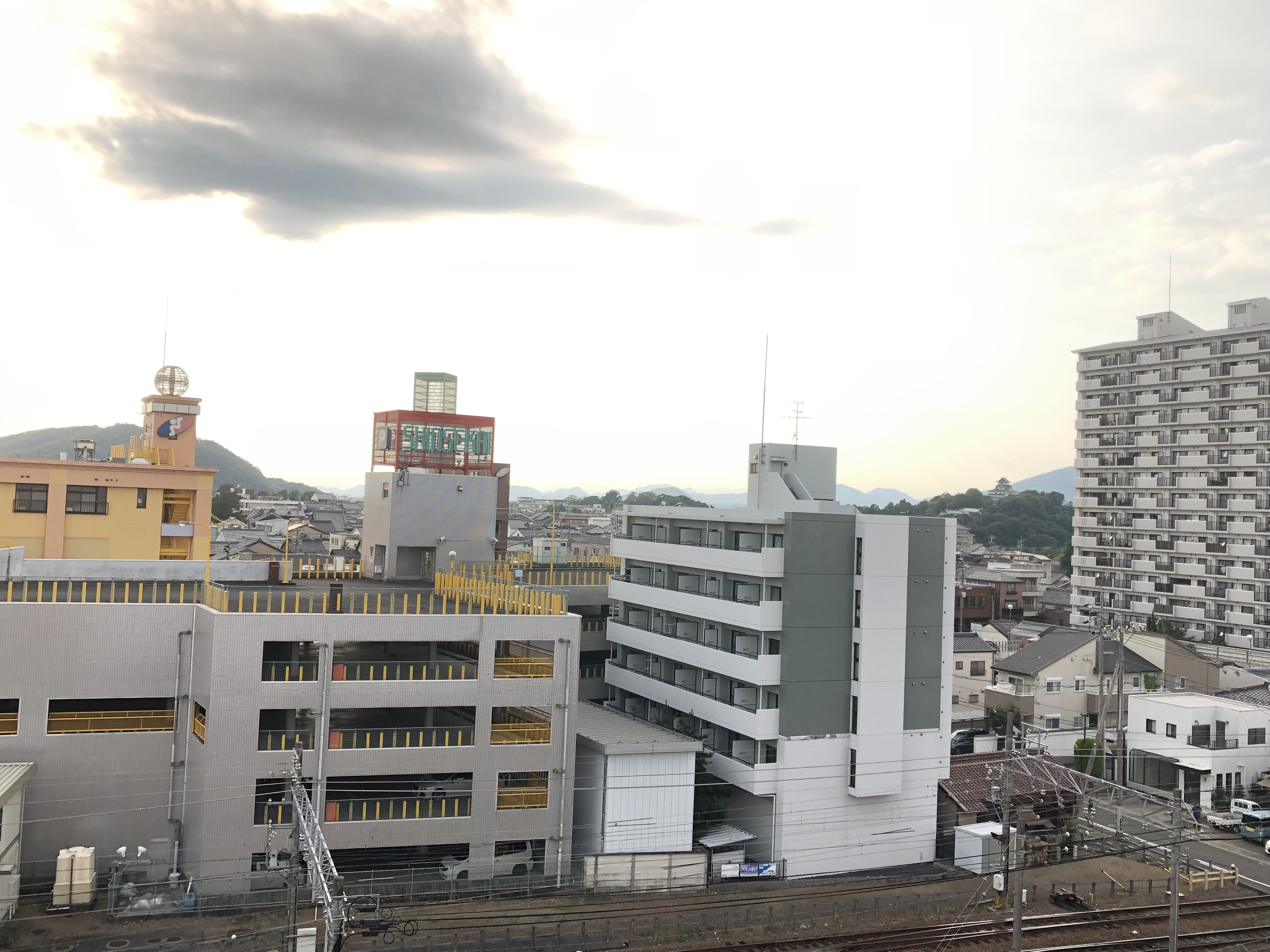
Downtown Inuyama

=== Secondary sector of the economy ===
==== Ceramic engineering ====
- Inuyama ware is a type of Japanese pottery made in the town in a number of kilns.

== Education ==
=== University ===
National Universities

- Kyoto University (Primate Research Institute)

Private Universities

- Nagoya Keizai University

=== Colleges ===
Private Colleges

- Nagoya Keizai University Junior College

=== Schools ===
Inuyama has ten public elementary schools and four public junior high schools operated by the city government, and two public high schools operated by the Aichi Prefectural Board of Education.

== Transportation ==
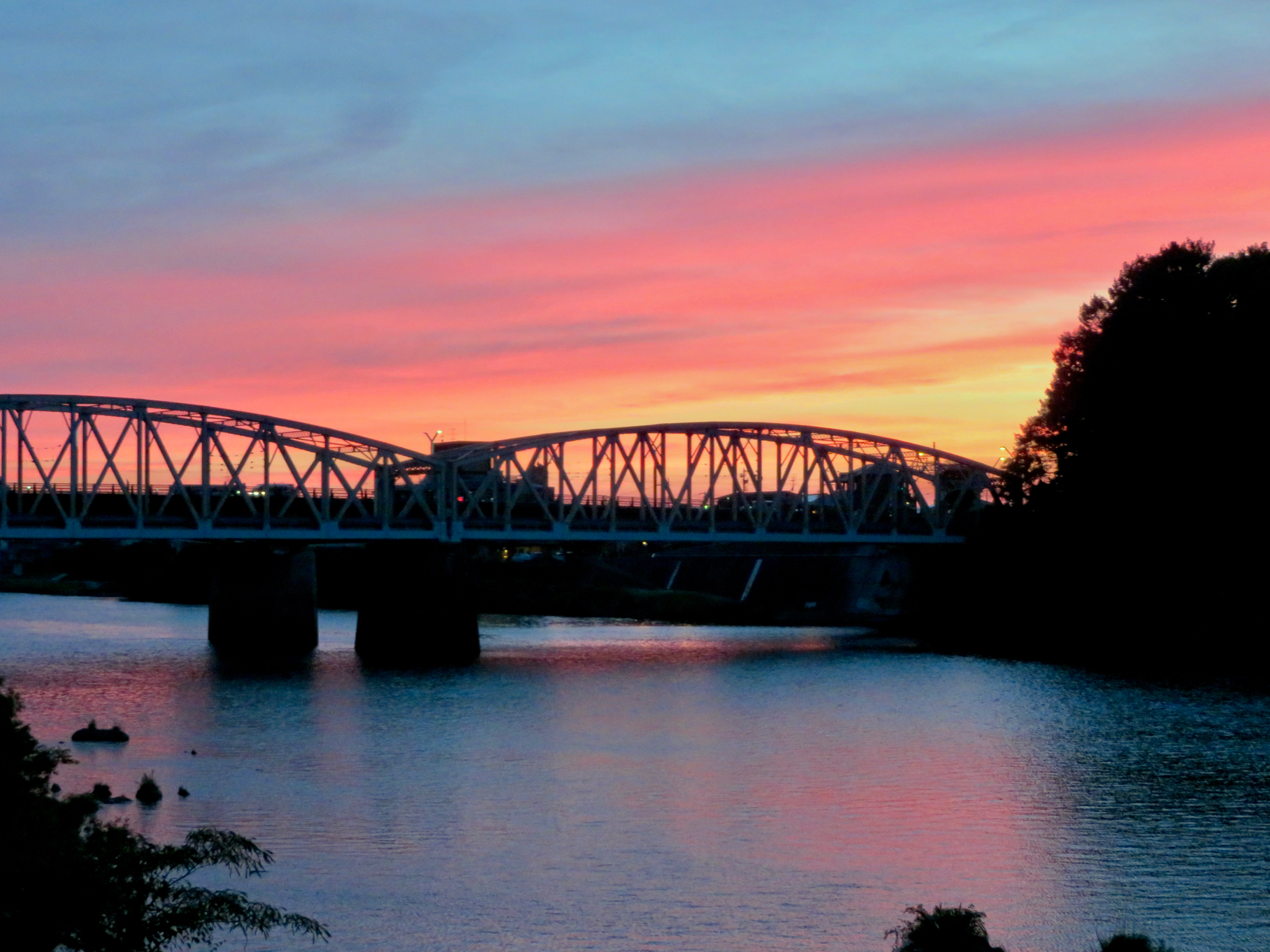
Inuyama Bridge

=== Railways ===
==== Conventional lines ====
Meitetsu

- Inuyama Line: - Inuyamaguchi - Inuyama - Inuyama-Yūen
- Komaki Line: - Gakuden - Haguro - Inuyama
- Hiromi Line: Inuyama - Tomioka-mae - Zenjino -

=== Roads ===
==== Japan National Route ====
- National Route 41

== Local attractions ==
=== Castles ===
- Inuyama Castle
- ruins of Gakuden Castle
- ruins of Kinoshita Castle

=== Museums ===
- Little World Museum of Man, an amusement park with an anthropological museum contained a large number of buildings built according to the native style of over 22 countries.
- Meiji Mura, an open-air architectural museum for preserving and exhibiting structures of the Meiji (1867–1912) and Taishō (1913–1926) eras. As of 2005, 67 historical buildings are preserved on an area of 1,000,000 m^{2}. The most famous one is the main entrance and lobby of Tokyo's old Imperial Hotel, designed by Frank Lloyd Wright and built in 1923.

=== Natural attractions ===
- Japan Monkey Park has different species of monkeys and other entertainment. Inuyama is the site of the Primate Research Institute of Kyoto University, one of the world's foremost centers for research in non-human primate biology and behavior. The chimpanzee Ai and her son Ayumu live there.
- The Kiso River has some very picturesque rapids upstream of Inuyama Castle. These rapids and rock formations are called the Nihon Rhine after the Rhine river in Germany, and boat tours are available. Cormorant fishing on the Kiso River is nowadays almost exclusively done for tourists.
- Lake Iruka, a reservoir listed by the International Commission on Irrigation and Drainage as a Heritage Irrigation Structure

=== Other structures ===
- Aigi Bridge, crossing the Kiso River into Kakamigahara in Gifu Prefecture
- Daishō-ji, a Shingon Buddhist temple
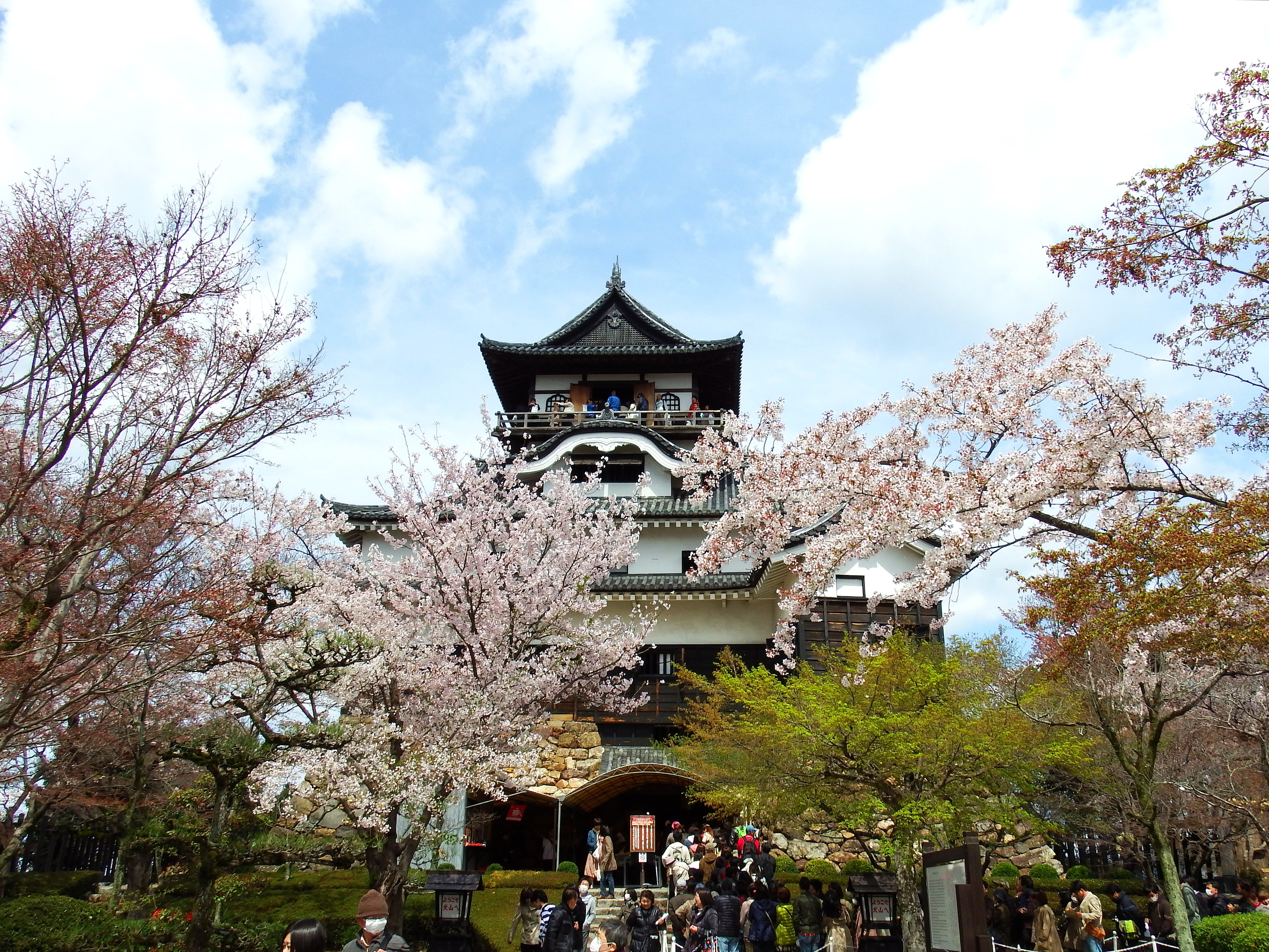
Inuyama Castle

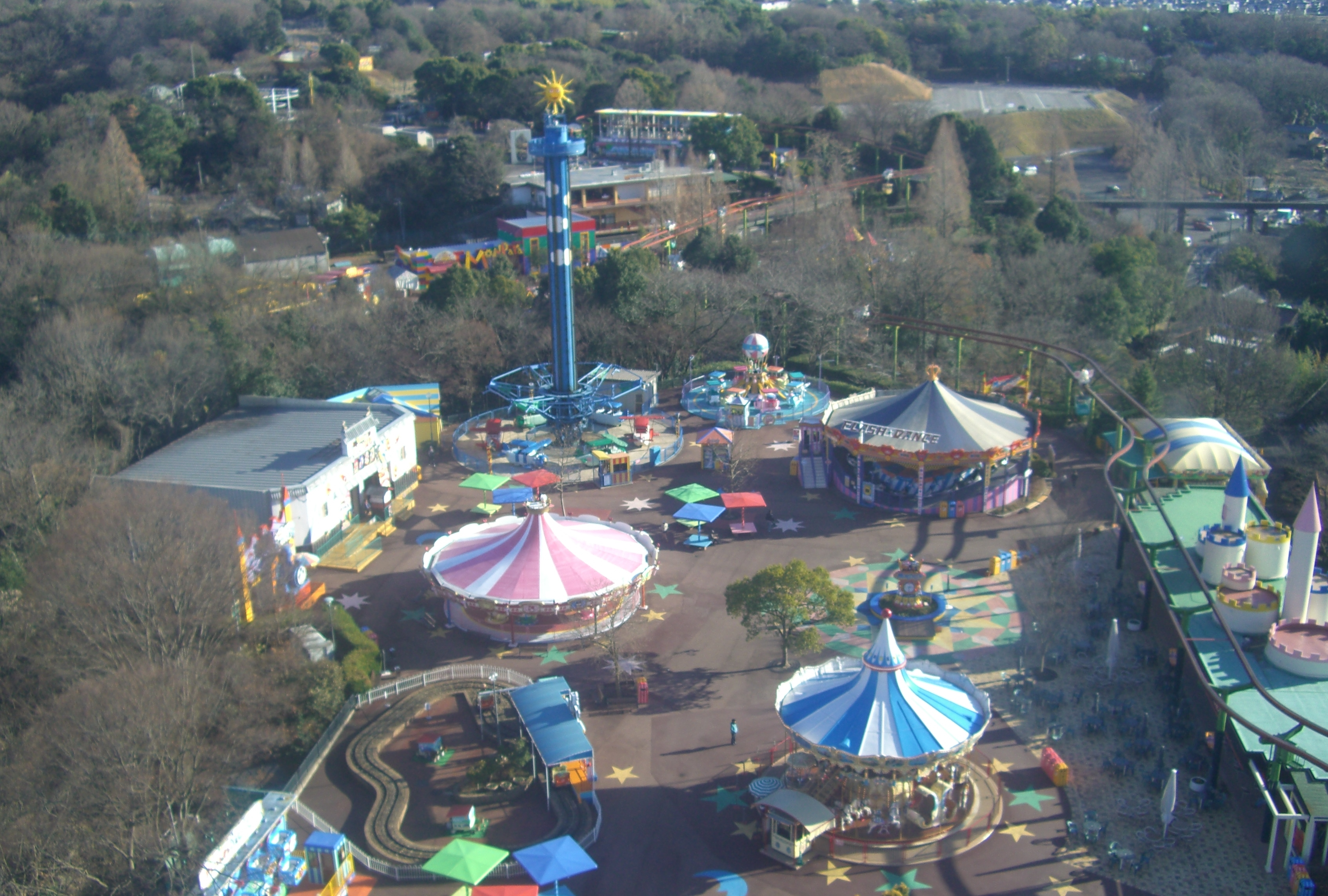
Japan Monkey Park

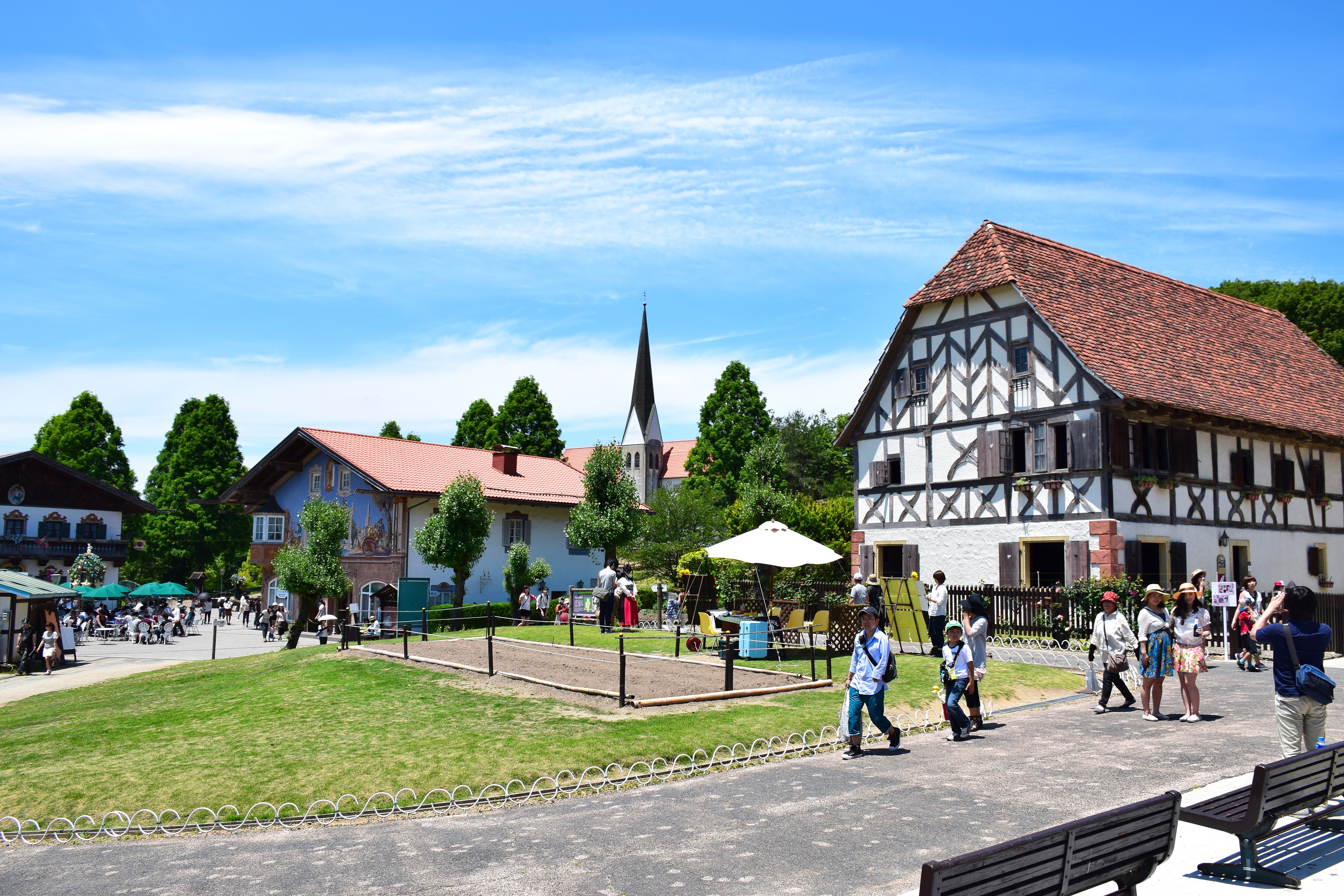
Little World Museum of Man

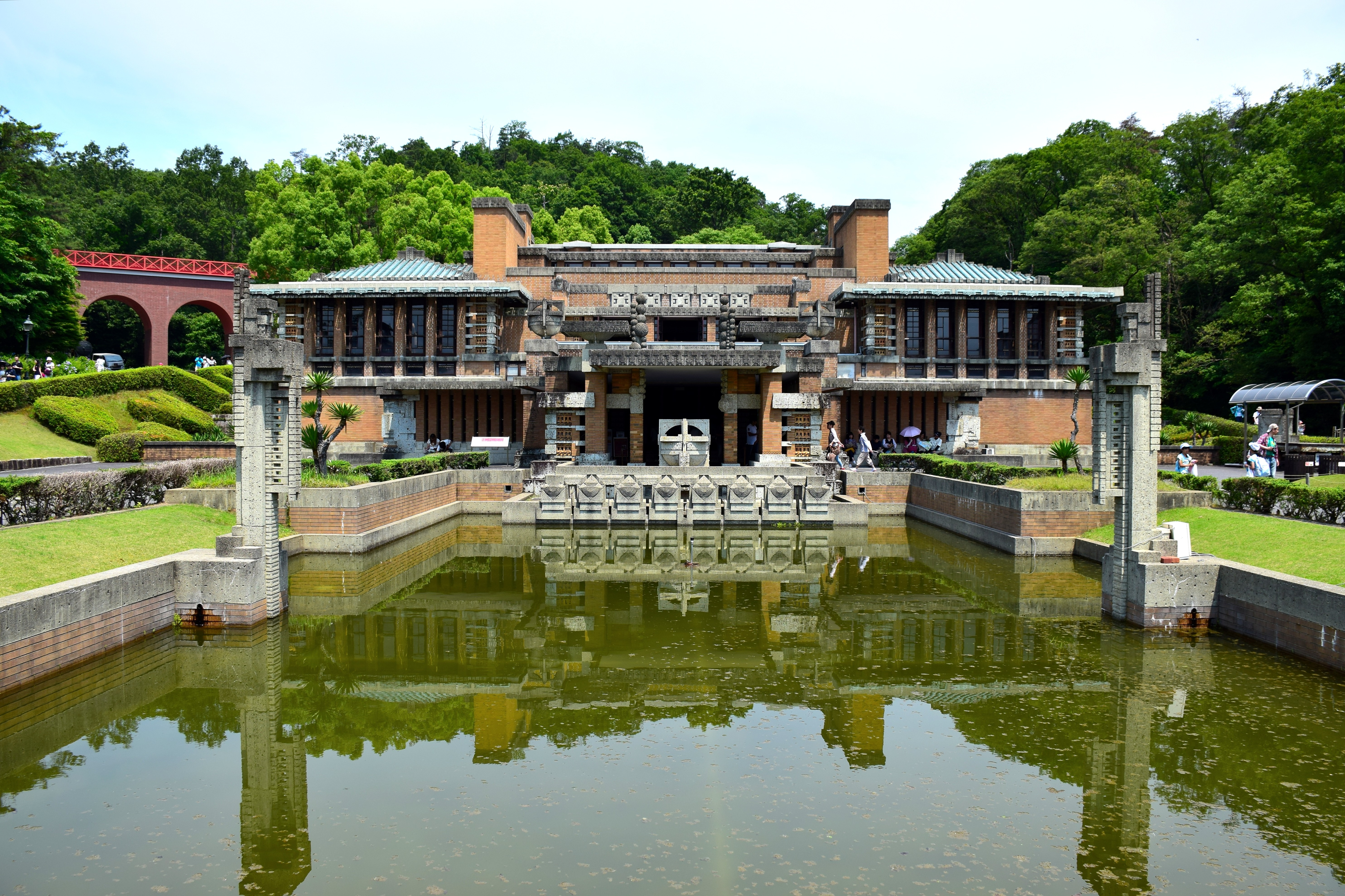
Meiji Mura

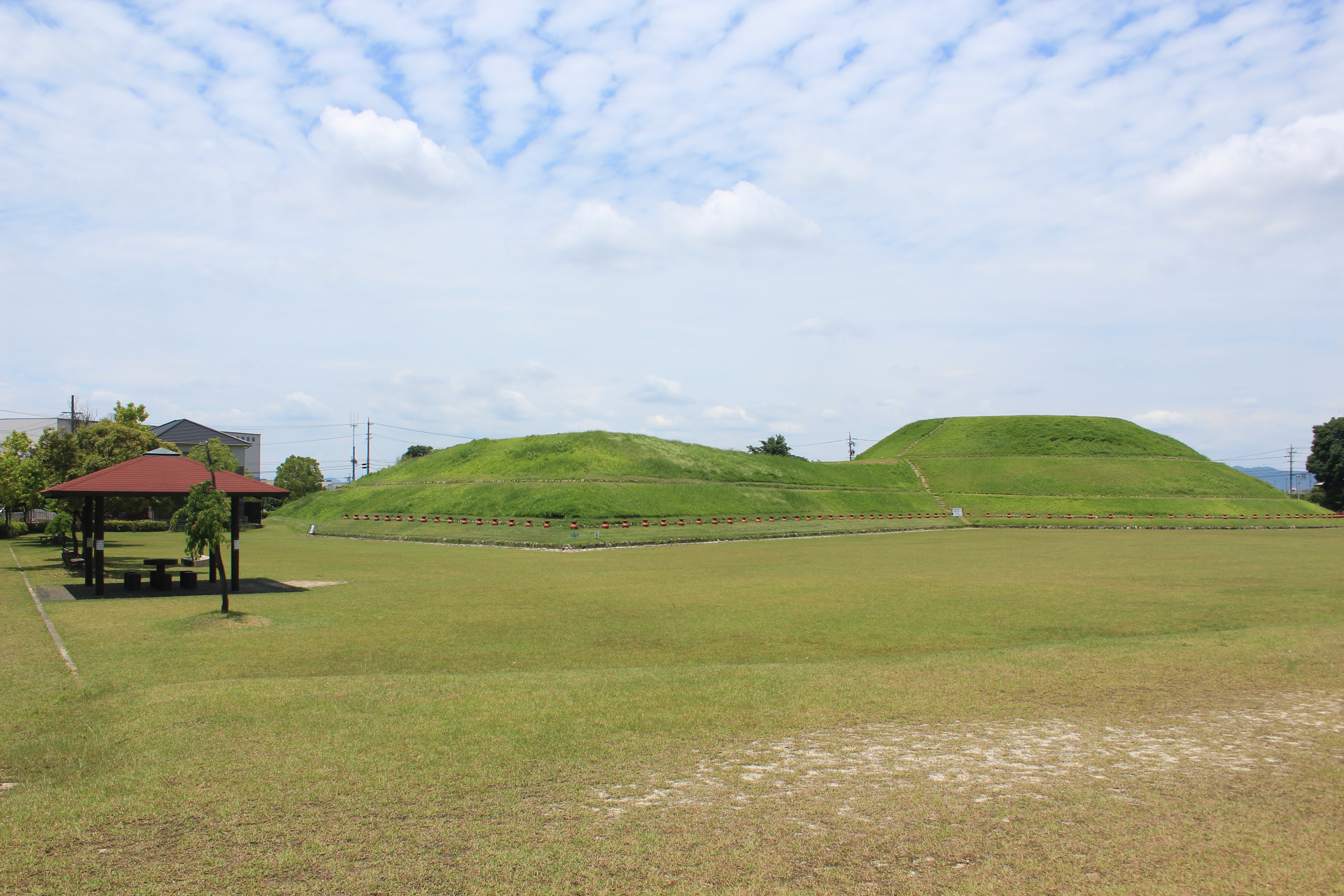
Aotsuka Kofun

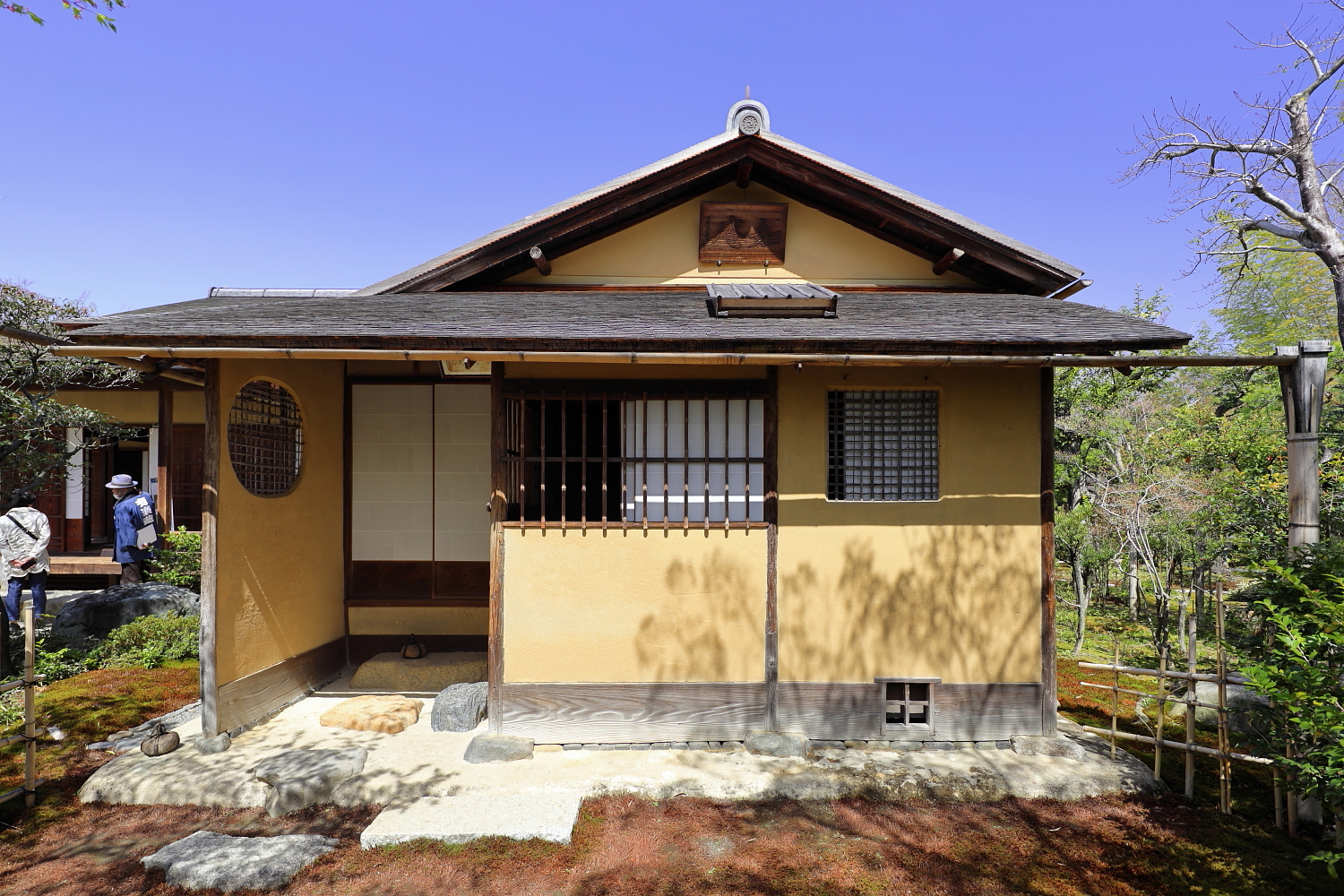
Jo-an tea house, a national treasure

== Culture ==
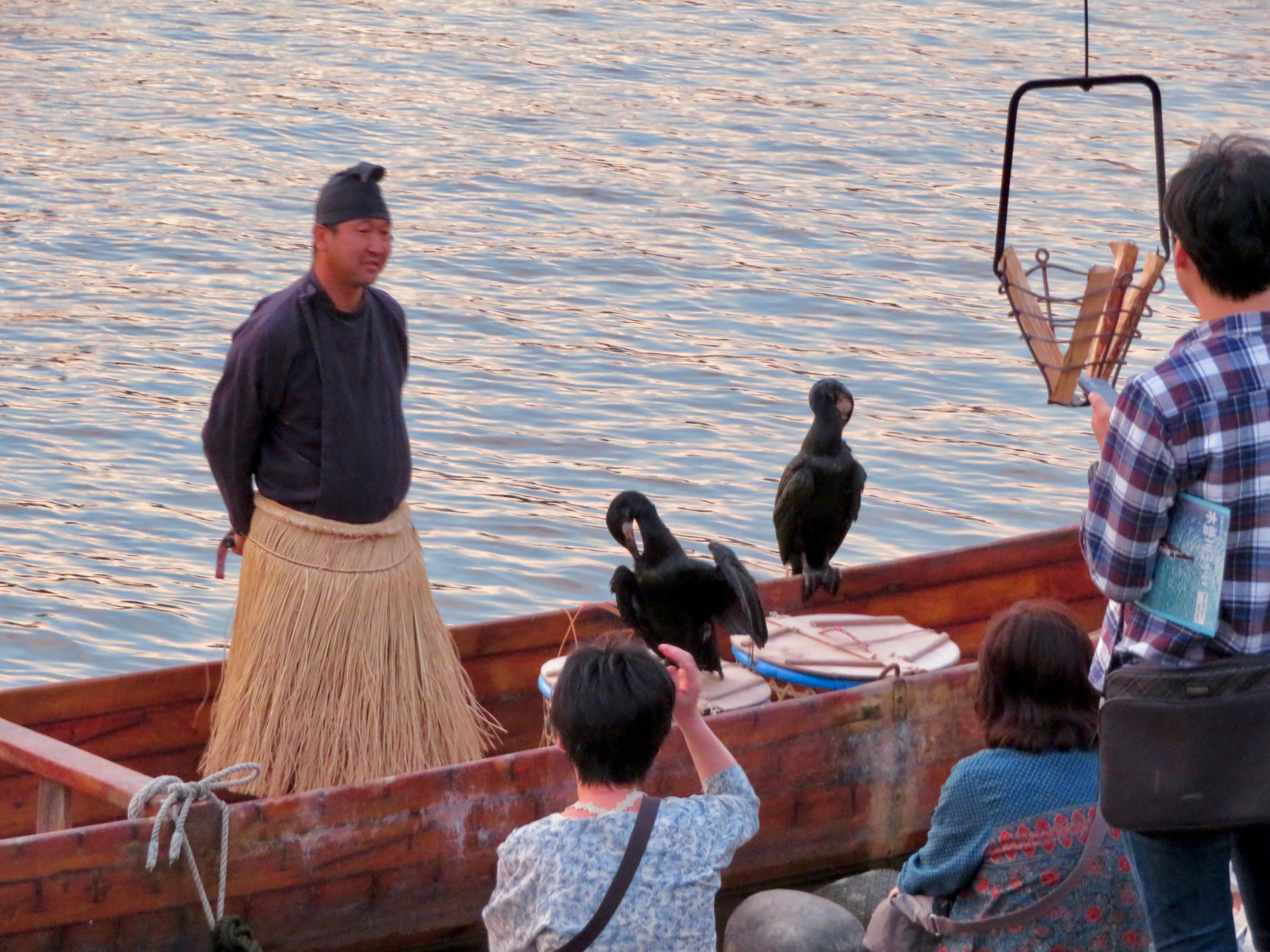
Cormorant fishing

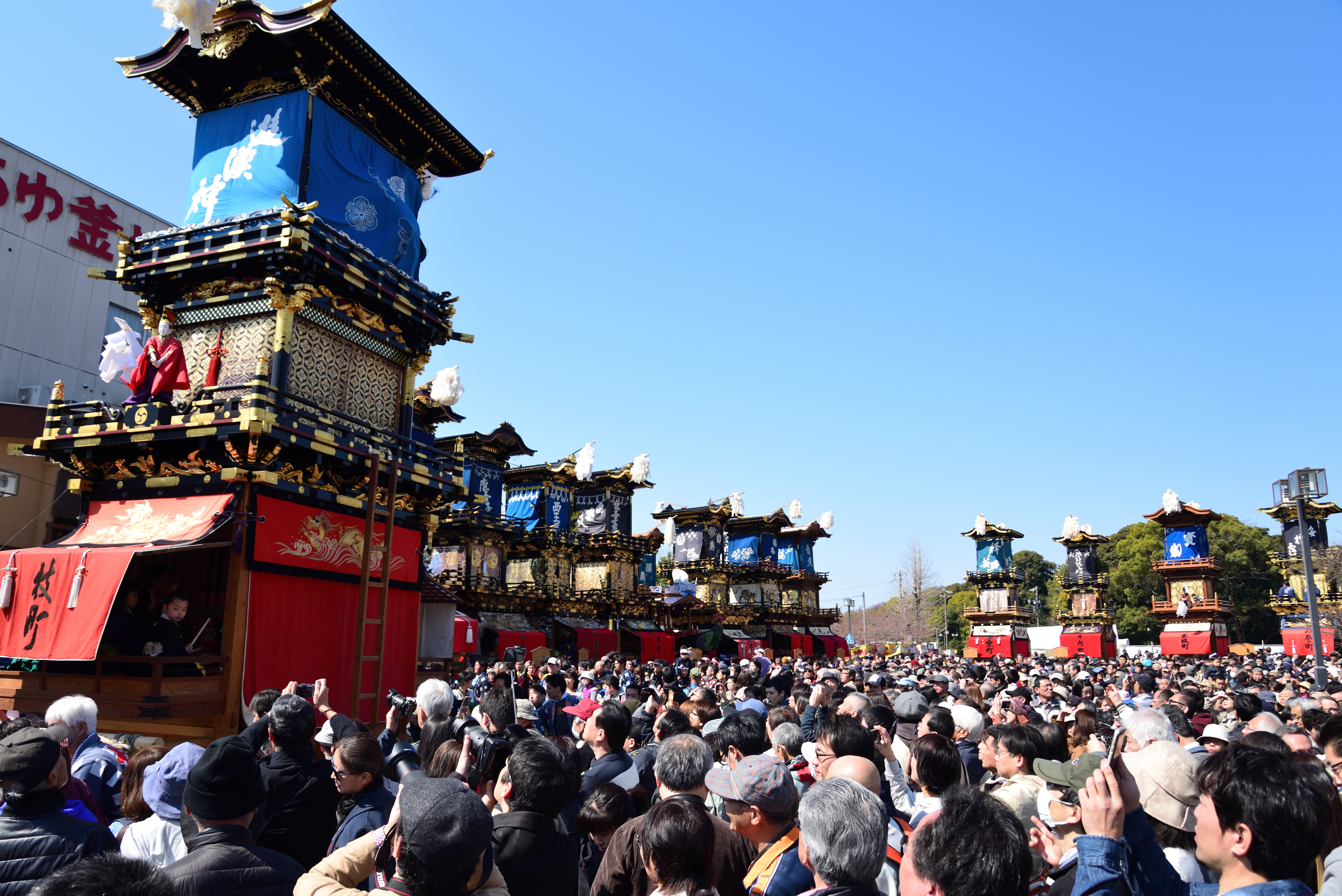
Inuyama Festival

- Cormorant fishing

=== Festival ===
- Inuyama Festival

== Notable people from Inuyama ==
- Kaori Moritani, musician
- Yashiro Rokurō, admiral in the Imperial Japanese Navy
- Masafumi Takada, composer and graphic designer
