= Shin Takamatsu =

Japanese architect

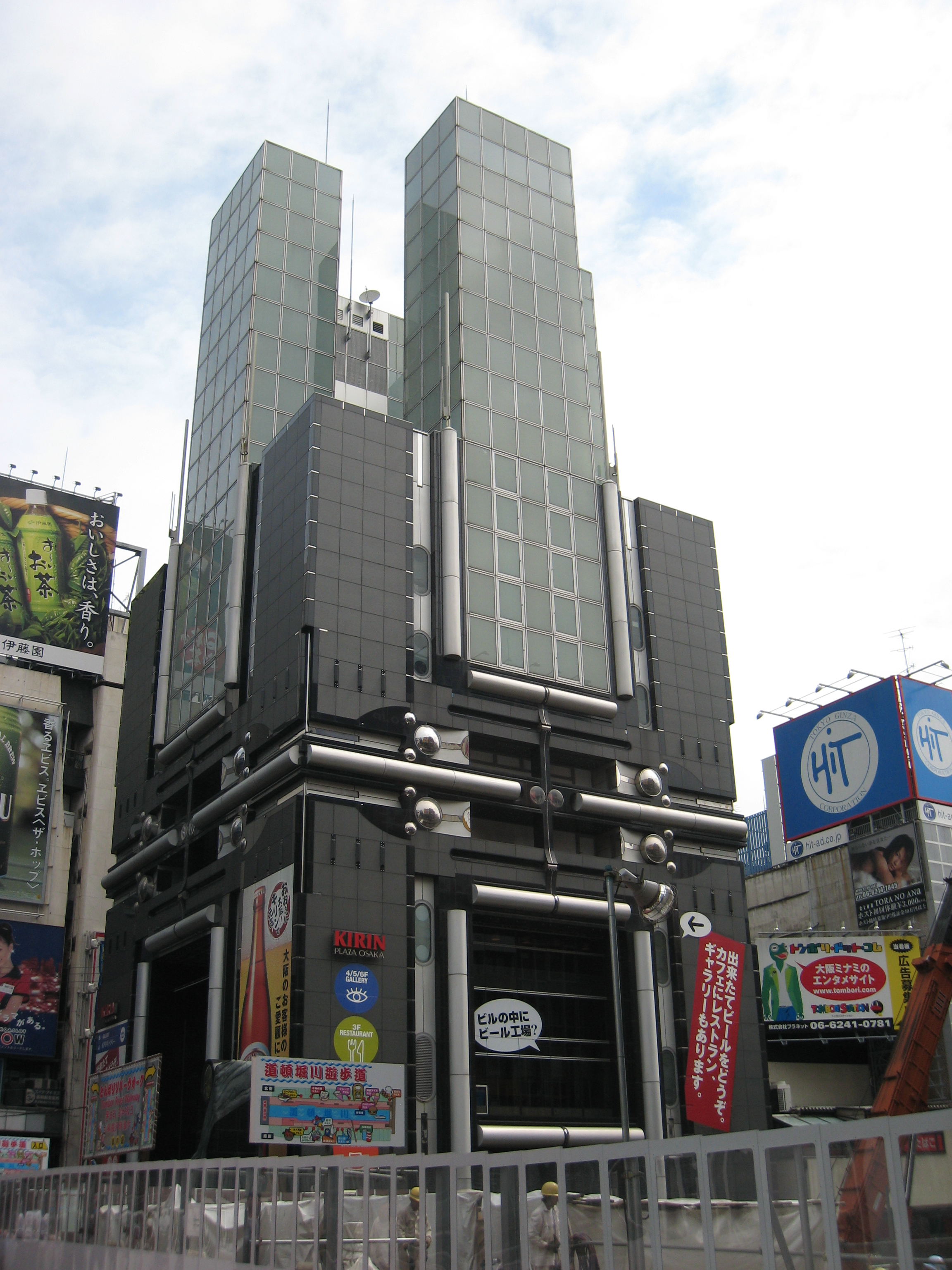
Kirin Plaza, Osaka (now demolished)

Shin Takamatsu (born August 5, 1948 in Nima, Shimane) is a Japanese architect. After obtaining his PhD from the Graduate School of Engineering at Kyoto University in 1980, he held various academic positions: lecturer at Osaka University of Arts in 1981, associate professor at Kyoto Seika University in 1987, professor at the Graduate School of Engineering, Kyoto University in 1997 and professor emeritus at Kyoto University in 2013. Takamatsu's futuristic designs often incorporate anthropomorphic or mechanical imagery.

== Notable projects ==
- Komakinetei, 1977, Hyogo Prefecture, Takarazuka, Japan
- Kido clinic, 1978, Kita-ku, Kyoto, Japan (not existing)
- Yamamoto Atelier, 1978, Nishikyo-ku, Kyoto, Japan
- Hubei electric second companies shop, 1978, Shimogyo-ku, Kyoto, Japan
- Ichon dyeing factory building, 1979, Ukyo-ku, Kyoto, Japan (not existing)
- Yamaguchi photo studio, 1980, Joyo, Kyoto, Japan
- Sasaki confectionery, 1978, Sakyo-ku, Kyoto, Japan
- Origin I, 1981, Kamigyo-ku, Kyoto, Japan (not existing)
- Shugakuin house I, 1981, Sakyo-ku, Kyoto, Japan
- Shimogamo house, 1982, Sakyo-ku, Kyoto, Japan
- Saifukuji Temple, 1982, Kani, Gifu, Japan
- Miyahara House, 1982, Kamigyo-ku, Kyoto, Japan
- Yoshida House, 1982, Nakagyo-ku, Kyoto, Japan
- Origin II, 1982, Kamigyo-ku, Kyoto, Japan (not existing)
- Terada of house, 1983, Joyo, Kyoto, Japan
- Ark Nishina dental clinic, 1983, Fushimi-ku, Kyoto, Japan
- Waterworks bureau staff's house, 1983, Higashisumiyoshi-ku, Osaka, Japan
- Pharaoh dental clinic, 1984, Minami-ku, Kyoto, Japan
- Garden, 1984, Nakagyo-ku, Kyoto, Japan
- Kyoto traditional craft Expo Theme Pavilion, 1984, Minami-ku, Kyoto, Japan (not existing)
- Dance Hall, 1984, Nagoya, Aichi Prefecture, Naka-ku, Japan
- Shugakuin house II, 1985, Sakyo-ku, Kyoto, Japan
- Week, 1986, Kita-ku, Kyoto, Japan (not existing)
- Ogura Flats, 1986, Uji, Kyoto, Japan
- Miyata House, 1986, Kita-ku, Kyoto, Japan
- Matsui House, 1986, Kita-ku, Kyoto, Japan
- Zach, 1986, Kita-ku, Kyoto, Japan
- Mon, 1986, Kita-ku, Kyoto, Japan
- School, 1986, Naka-ku, Nagoya, Japan
- Origin III, 1986, Kamigyo-ku, Kyoto, Japan (not existing)
- Unagidani Ining'23, 1987, Chuo-ku, Osaka, Japan
- Gazon-E, 1987, Moriyama, Shiga, Japan
- Cube Minamimukonoso, 1987, Amagasaki, Hyogo Prefecture, Japan
- Cube AMX, 1987, Amagasaki, Hyogo Prefecture, Japan
- '87 World castle Expo venue, 1987, Shiga Prefecture Hikone, Japan (not existing)
- Maruhigashi Gion building, 1987, Higashiyama-ku, Kyoto, Japan
- MK Oil Higashigojo gas station, 1987, Yamashina-ku, Kyoto, Japan
- Kirin Plaza, 1987, Chuo-ku, Osaka, Japan (not existing)
- Kitayama Ining'23, 1987, Sakyo-ku, Kyoto, Japan
- Orphe, 1987, Nishio, Aichi, Japan
- Yodoyabashi Imanishi Bill 3, 1987, Chuo-ku, Osaka, Japan
- Auberge, 1987, Ukyo-ku, Kyoto, Japan
- Tatoo, 1989, Sapporo, Hokkaido, Japan
- Station MK, 1989, Higashiyama-ku, Kyoto, Japan
- Strawberries and main building, 1989, Chofu, Tokyo, Japan (not existing)
- Solaris, 1990, Amagasaki, Hyogo Prefecture
- SYNTAX, 1990, Sakyo-ku, Kyoto, Japan (not existing)
- Nima Sand Museum, 1990, Oda, Shimane, Japan
- Imanishi Motoakasaka, 1991, Minato, Tokyo, Japan
- Earth Tech char sub-one, 1991, Shibuya, Tokyo, Japan
- Ueno Green Club, 1992, Taito, Tokyo, Japan
- Octagon, 1992, Shibuya, Tokyo, Japan
- ORC Project, 1992, (not realized)
- Kunibiki Messe hall, Shimane, 1993
- Shimane Prefectural Industrial Exchange Hall Kunibiki Messe, 1993, Matsue, Shimane Prefecture, Japan
- Hotel Ravie Kawaryo, 1994, Ito, Shizuoka, Japan
- Quasar, 1995, Berlin, Germany
- Shoji Ueda Museum of Photography, 1995, Hoki, Tottori, Japan
- Kirin Headquarters, 1995, Chuo, Tokyo, Japan (not existing)
- Nagasaki Port Passenger Terminal, 1995, Nagasaki, Japan
- Mihonoseki Sea Gakuen hometown Creation Museum Meteor Plaza, 1995, Matsue, Shimane Prefecture, Japan
- Hamada World Children's Museum, 1996, Hamada, Shimane, Japan
- Minato Sakai Exchange Center, 1997, Sakaiminato, Tottori, Japan
- Sugawara Lifelong Learning (Social) Center, 1997, Hirakata, Osaka, Japan
- Kitanagoya Community Center, 1997, Kitanagoya, Aichi Prefecture, Japan
- Fuchu Community Center, 1998, Fuchu, Hiroshima, Japan
- Nose Myoken-san Worship Hall, 1998, Kawanishi, Hyogo, Japan
- Higashi Honganji Reception Hall, 1998, Shimogyo-ku, Kyoto, Japan
- Wacoal Headquarters, 1998, Minami-ku, Kyoto, Japan
- Babelsberg fx. Center, 1999, Potsdam, Germany
- Shikatsu Community Center, 2000 Shikatsu, Aichi, Japan
- Black Pearl, 2002, Taipei, Taiwan
- National Theatre Okinawa, 2003, Urasoe, Okinawa, Japan
- Tianjin Museum, 2004, Tianjin, China
- Namba Hips, 2007, Chuo-ku, Osaka, Japan
- Bidzina Ivanishvili residence, Tbilisi, Georgia, 2007
- Formosa Boulevard Station of Kaohsiung MRT, 2008, Sinsing District, Kaohsiung, Taiwan
- Marumisangyo Headquarters, 2008, Nagoya, Japan
- Shitennoji Gakuen Elementary School, 2009, Fukushima-ku, Osaka, Japan
- Doshisha International Institute, 2011, Kizugawa, Kyoto, Japan
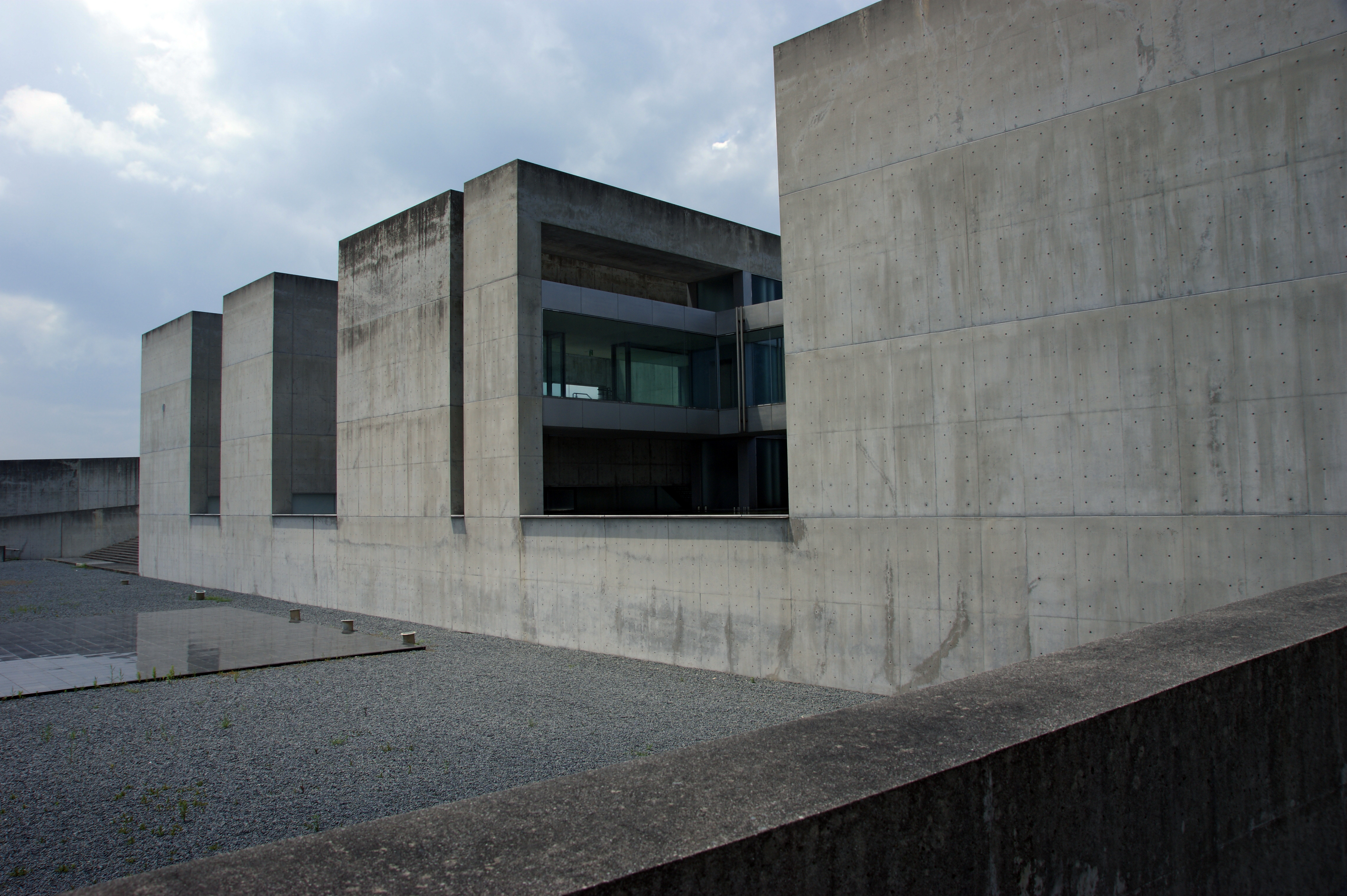
Shōji Ueda Museum of Photography, Hōki, Tottori

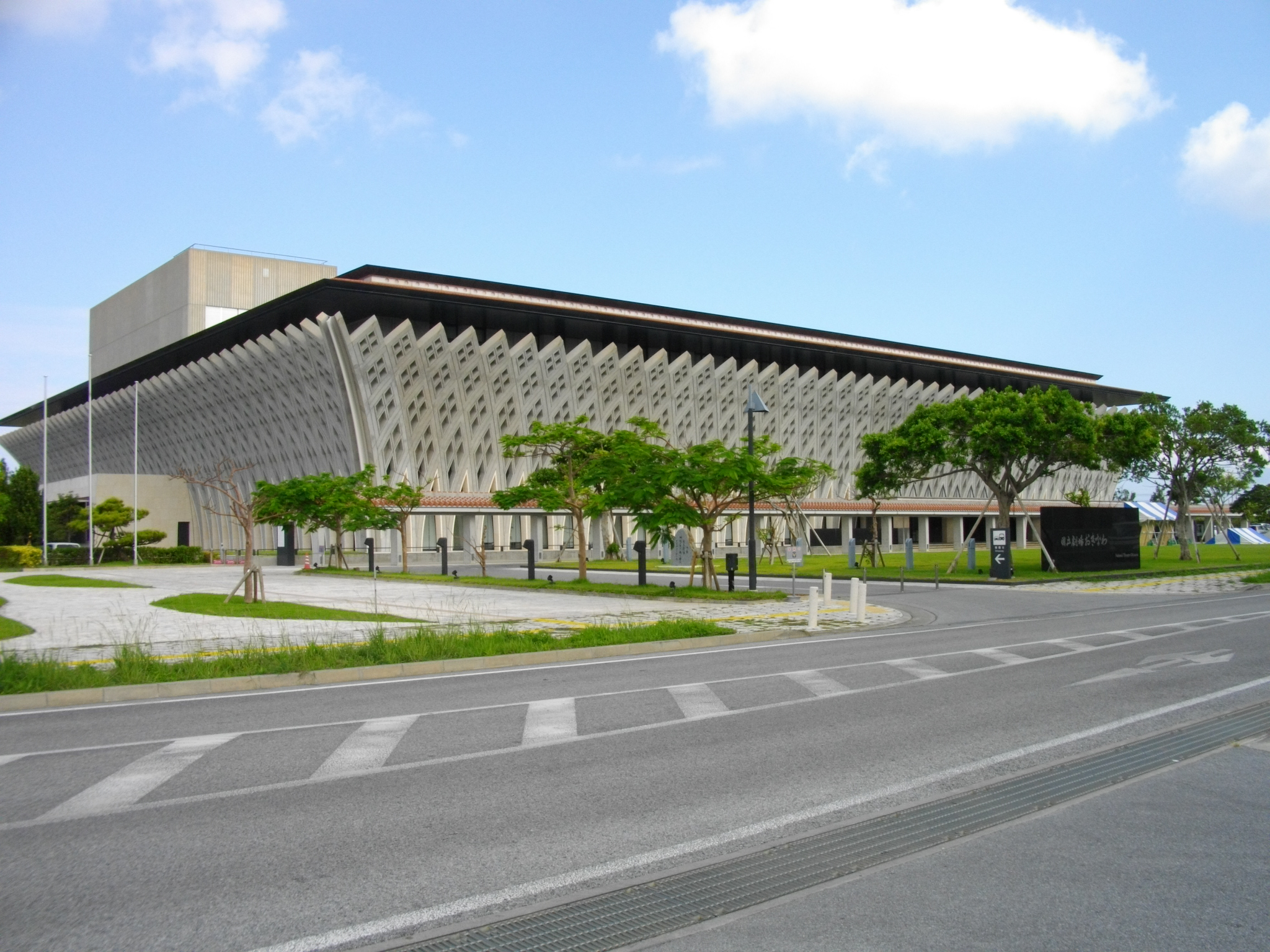
National Theater, Okinawa

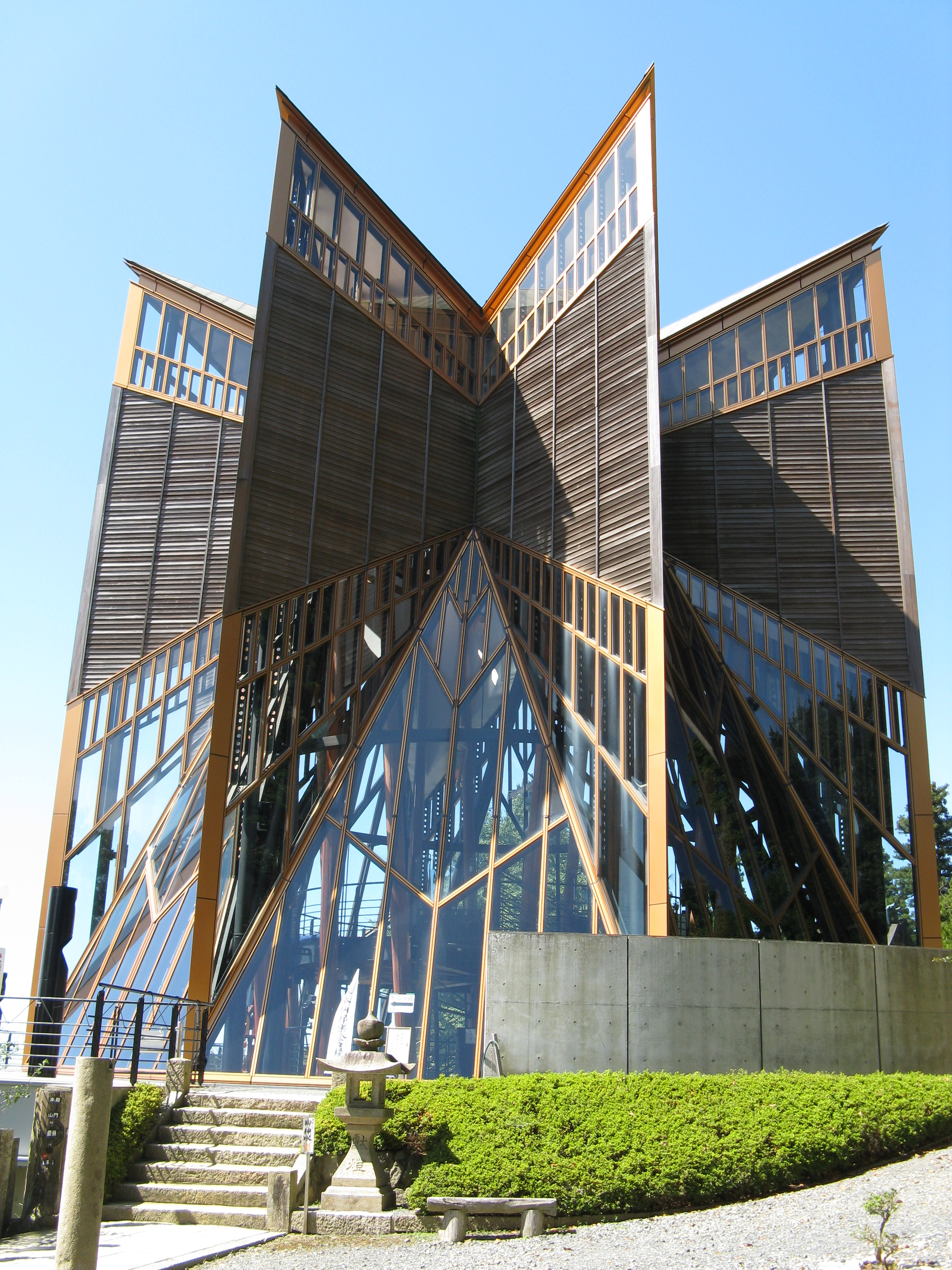
Nose Myoken-san Temple, Kawanishi, Hyogo

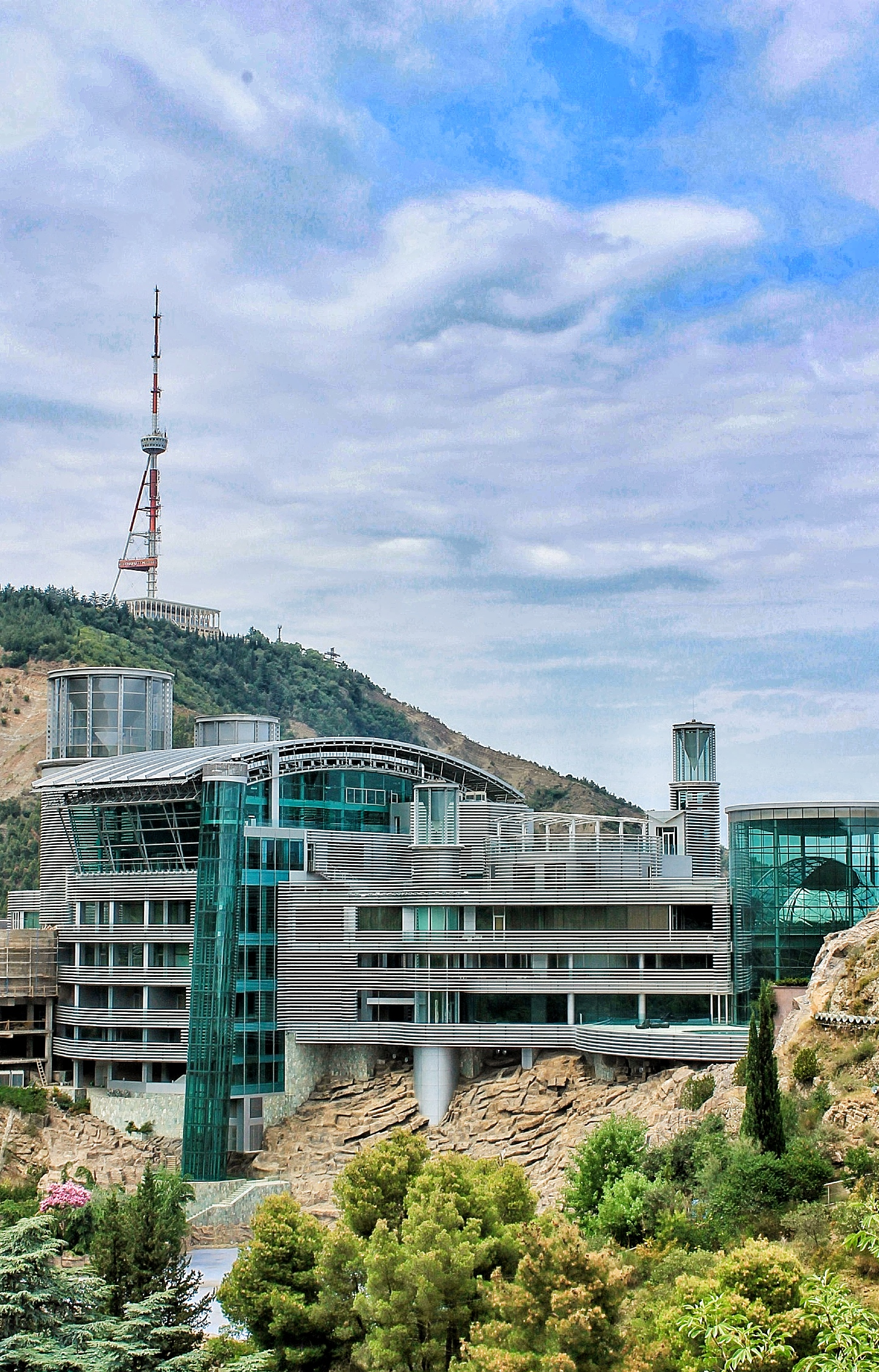
Bidzina Ivanishvili business center, Tbilisi
