= Yùn (surname) =

Chinese family name

Yùn (simplified Chinese: 恽; traditional Chinese: 惲) is a Chinese surname. It is not in the top 400 most common surnames in China, nor was it included in the Hundred Family Surnames poem.

== Notable people ==
- Yun Bing (惲冰, fl. 17th century), artist specialising in the "boneless" technique
- Yun Shouping (惲壽平, 1633 – 1690), also known as Yun Nantian (南田), one of the Six Masters of the early Qing period
- Yun Zhu (惲珠, 1771–1833), a poet, painter, and anthologist
- Yun Daiying (恽代英, 1895–1931), early leader of the Communist Party executed by the Kuomintang
- Yun Zhiwei (恽之玮, born 1982), mathematician specialising in number theory
