= Boneless =

Boneless may refer to:

- Meat sold without bones.
  - Boneless "buffalo wings," pieces of chicken made to resemble chicken wings.
- "Boneless" (song), a song by Steve Aoki and Chris Lake with music producer Tujamo
- Ivar the Boneless (died 873), Viking leader
- Mogu, "boneless" wash painting, a type of painting by ink washes without outlines
- A fictional 2 dimensional race from Doctor Who
