= Ma Yuanyu =

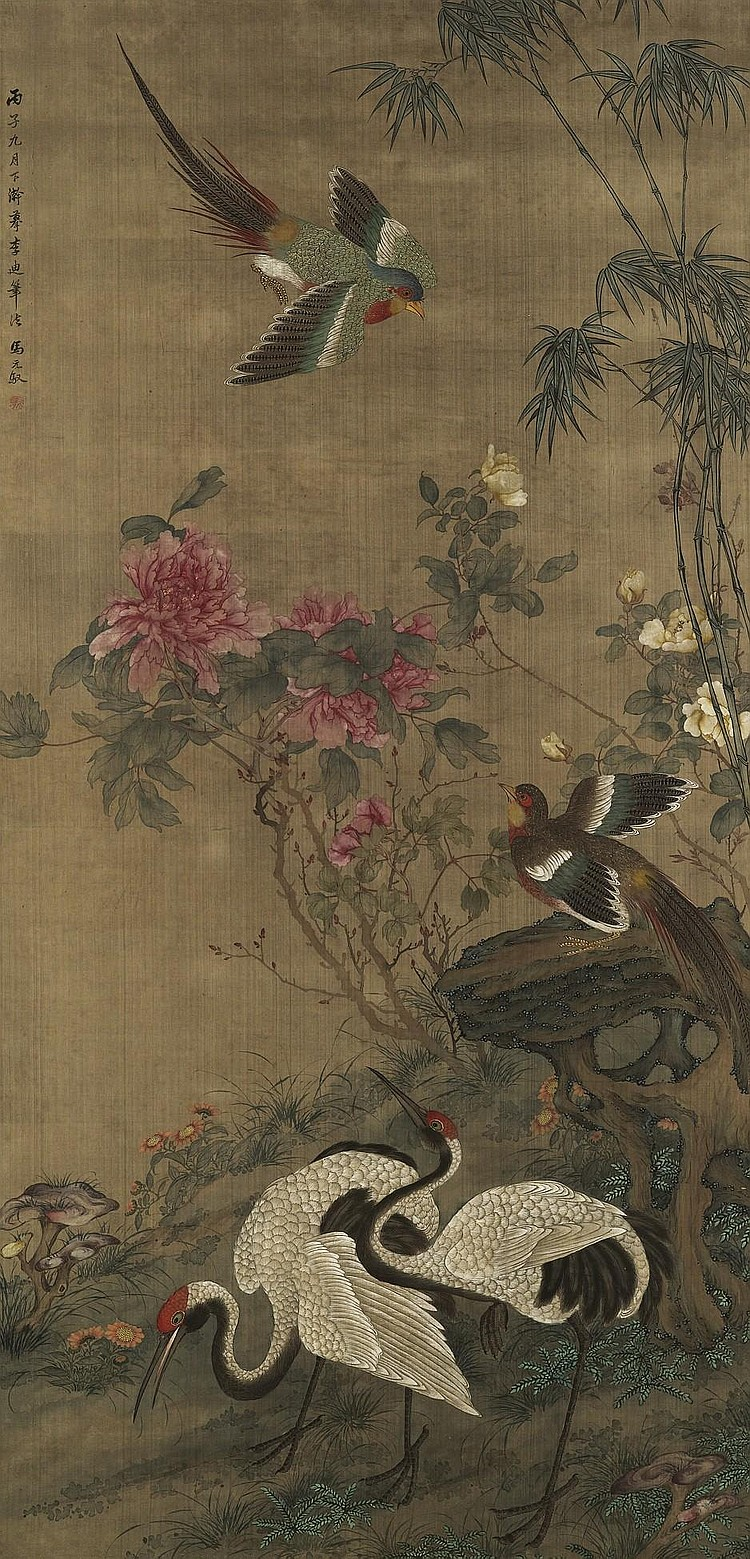
Cranes, Birds and Peonies

Ma Yuanyu (Wade–Giles: Ma Yüan-yü, traditional: 馬元馭, simplified: 马元驭; pinyin: Mă Yuányù); ca. 1669-1722 was a Chinese painter during the Qing Dynasty (1644–1912).

Ma was born in Changshu in the Jiangsu province. His style name was 'Fuxi' (伏羲) and his sobriquets were 'Xixia' (棲霞) and 'Tianyu shanren' (天虞山人). Ma was taught by Yun Shouping, and specialized in Bird-and-flower painting.

Ma's daughter, Ma Quan, continued his realistic painting style, though her subject matter was more of the bird and flower painting school.

== See also ==
- Ma Quan
