= Ma Quan =

Chinese artist

- 馬荃
- Born: Changshu, Jiangsu
- Notable work: Flowers and Plants (花卉图) (1711); Guanyin's Mien (观音像) (1734); Birds and Flowers (花鸟图) (1755)
- Style: Bird-and-flower painting
- Spouse: Gong Kehe (龚克和)

Chinese name
- Traditional Chinese: 馬荃
- Simplified Chinese: 马荃
Transcriptions
Standard Mandarin
- Hanyu Pinyin: Mǎ quán
- Wade–Giles: Ma Ch'üan

Jiangxiang
- Chinese: 江香
Transcriptions
Standard Mandarin
- Hanyu Pinyin: Jiāngxiāng
- Wade–Giles: Chiang-hsiang

Ma Quan (Chinese: 馬荃, dates unknown), courtesy name Jiangxiang (Chinese: 江香), was a Qing painter who lived during the late 17th–18th centuries, specialising in bird and flower painting. As a female artist who sold her paintings, Ma's art style is markedly different from both that of the imperial court and contemporary "talented young ladies" (Chinese: 名媛).

== Biography ==
Little information exists on Ma Quan's life, but sources suggest that she was born in Changshu and was either the daughter or granddaughter of the artist-scholar Ma Yuanyu. In later life, Ma suffered from blindness, and her students' paintings were sold with her signature.

She made bird and flower paintings to sell when she and her husband encountered financial difficulties. Gradually, her paintings became so popular that other people prepared the paint for her to allow her to make more works faster. In her later years, she was compared favourably to Ming dynasty artists like Shen Zhou, and many people in Changshu, particularly women, sought her out to request tuition, including an artist who would later gain fame, Jiang Lixi (Chinese: 蒋季锡).

== Art ==
Ma's subjects include butterflies, bees, and dragonflies, with modern critics identifying her brushwork as very controlled producing particularly fine strokes. She mainly painted flowers and birds seen in an ordinary garden, contrasting with the paintings of the imperial court. To one painting of chrysanthemums, Ma added a poem about how she has no place to plant such flowers but can tend them with her brush. In comparison with Ma Yuanyu, Ma Quan's works have been described as similarly realist, but capable of conveying an aesthetic essence. The later Qing artist Tai Zuyong (Chinese: 秦祖永) described her paintings as having alluring brushwork of serene interest. Ma was strongly influenced by Song dynasty art styles, which she expresses in her frequent tags that an image had been painted in the "style of the Song".

Ma's paintings have been compared with those of Yun Bing (Chinese: 恽冰), another female artist in the Jiangsu region and the aunt of Yun Zhu. Whilst Yun was known for her skill in painting subjects without outlines (Chinese: 没骨法), Ma was skilled at creating paintings with defined silhouettes (Chinese: 勾染法).

== Gallery ==
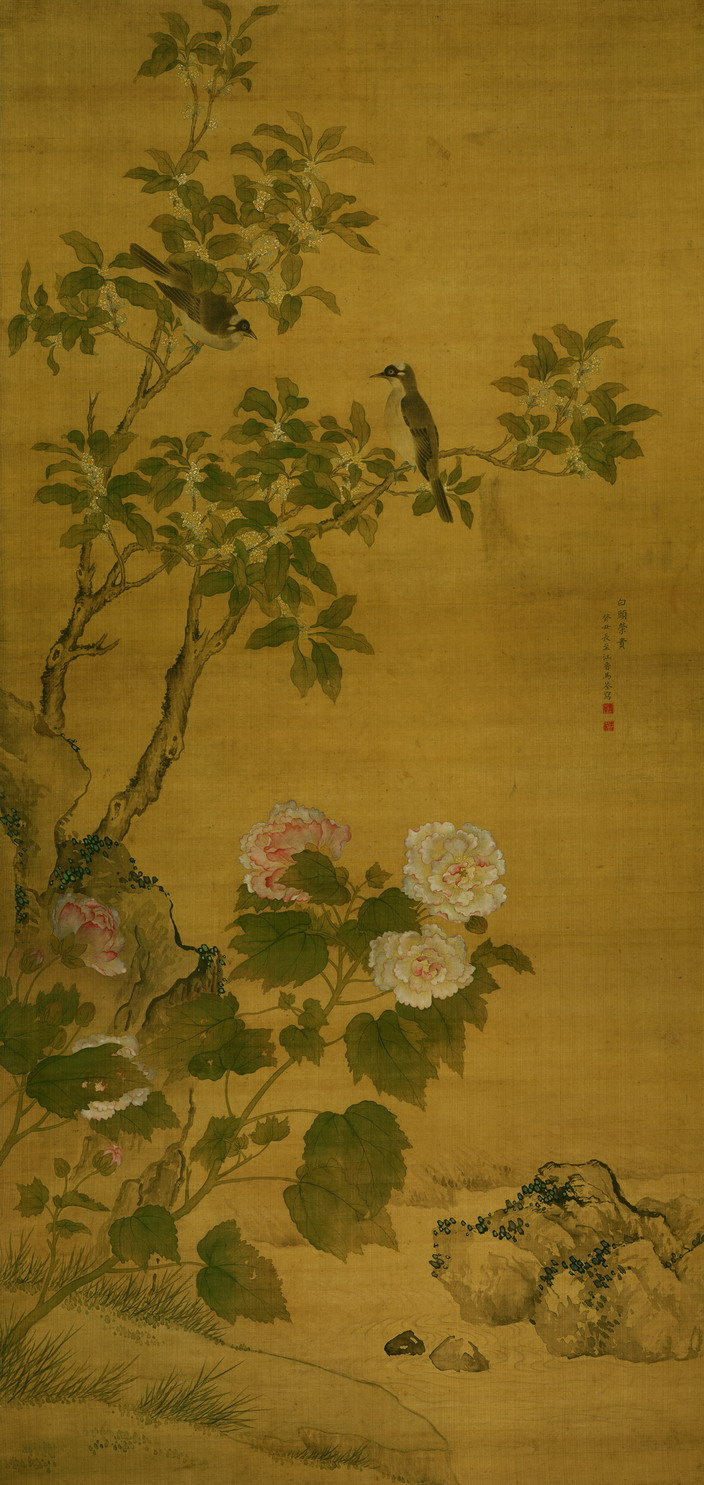
The White Head's Honour and Glory (白头荣贵图), Tianjin Museum

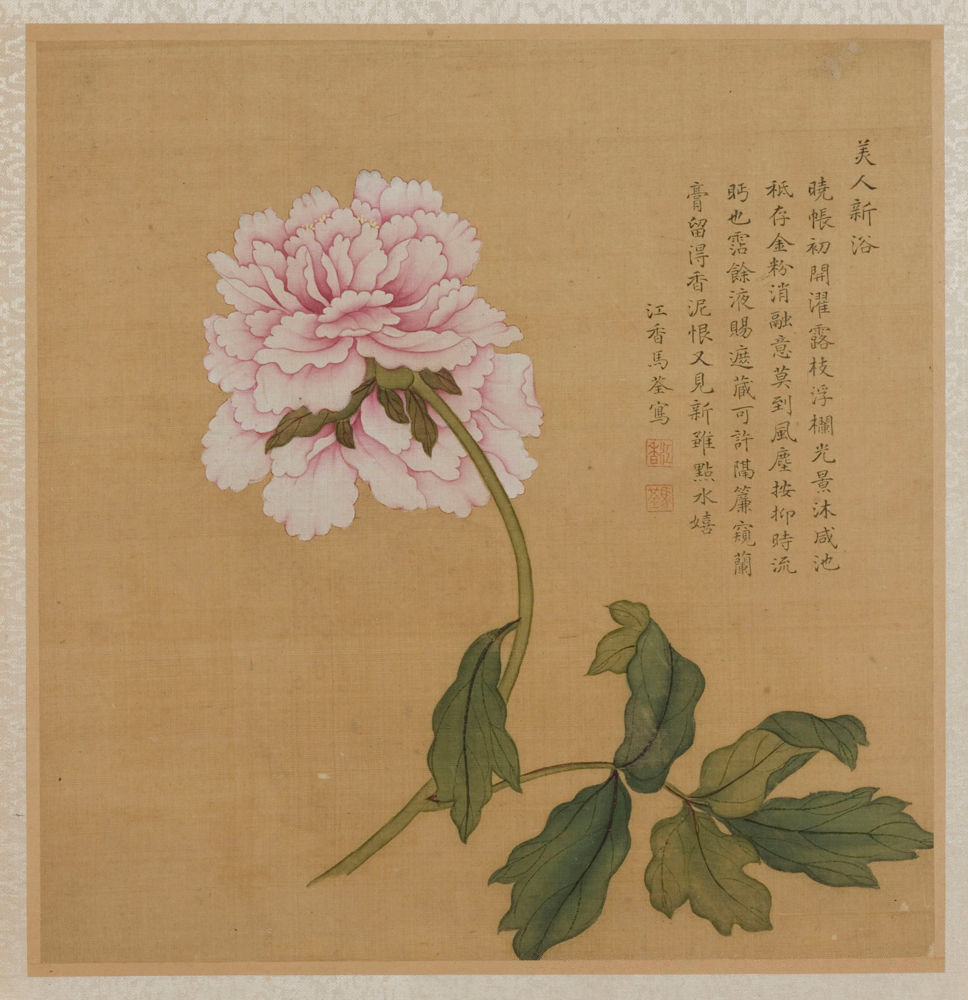
Flower Painted on a Folded Leaf (设色花卉折页）, Shenzhen Museum

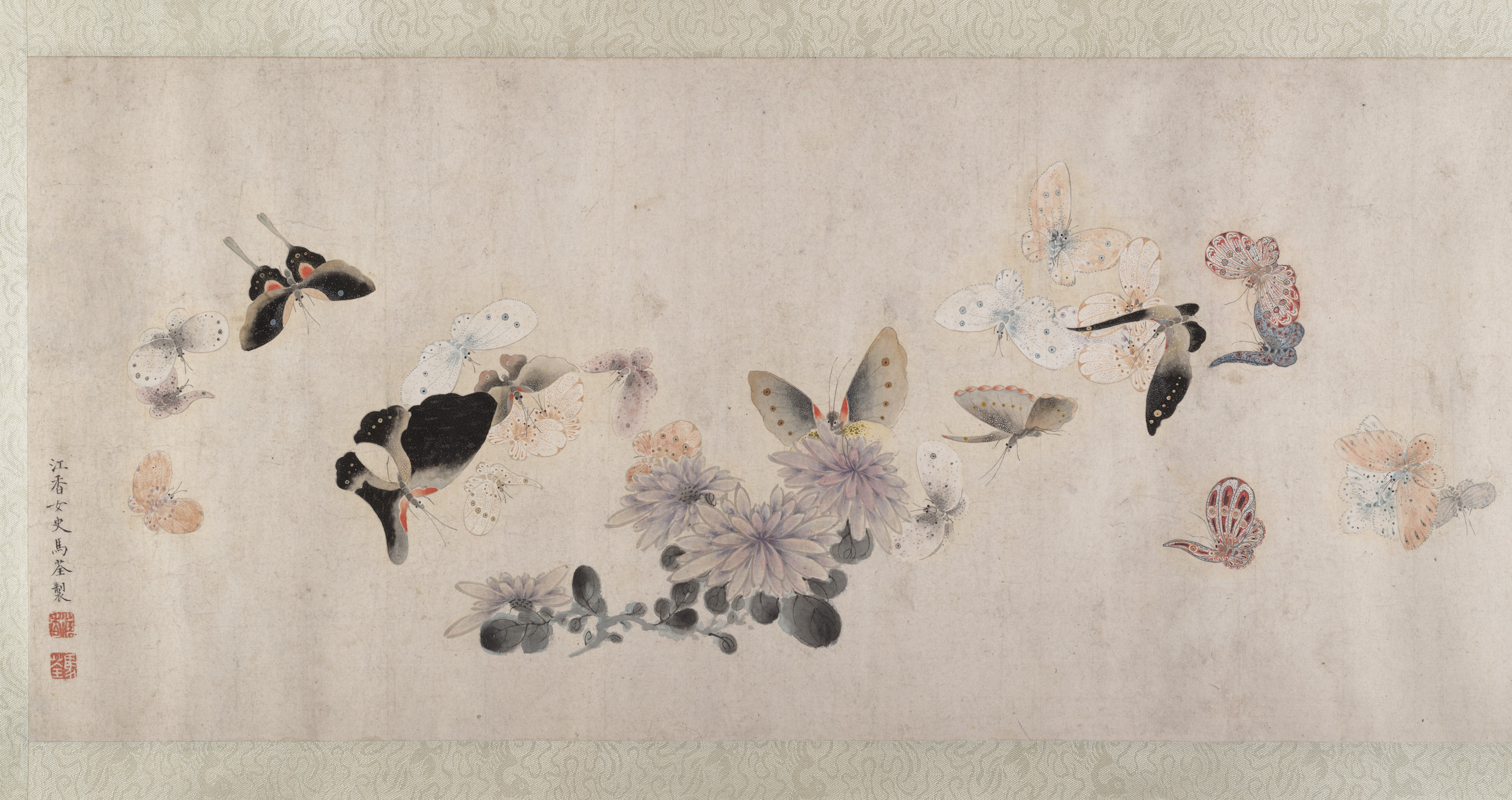
Flowers and Butterflies (花蝶圖), Metropolitan Museum of Art

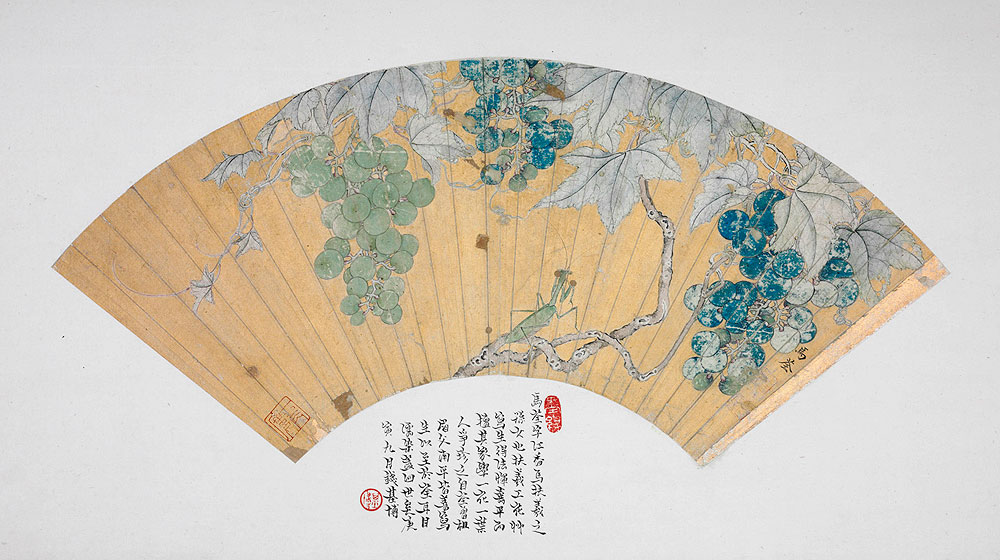
Grapes and Mantis (葡萄螳螂图), Hunan Museum

== See also ==
- Yun Zhu
