= Nagoya University of the Arts =

Private university in Japan

- 名古屋芸術大学
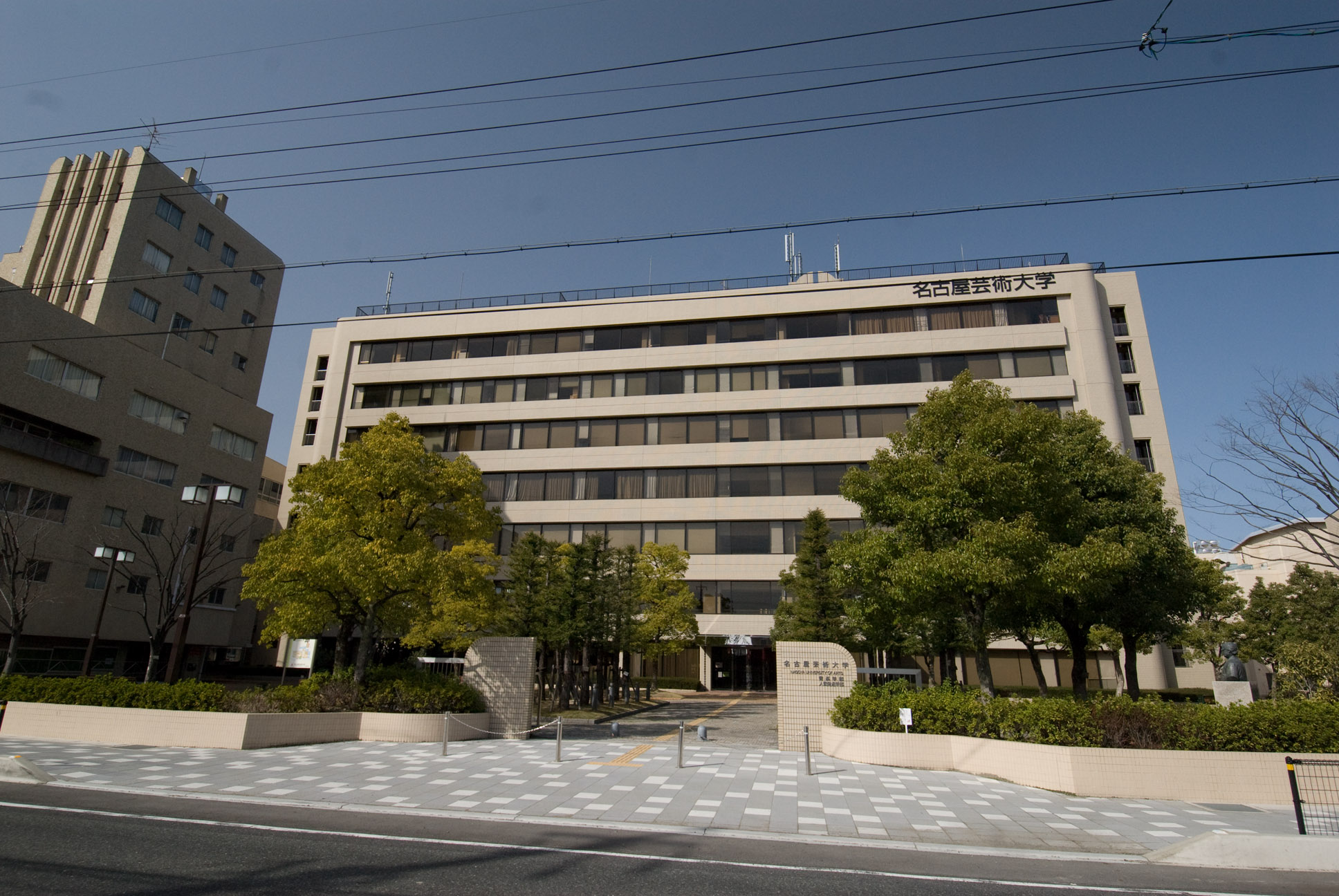
- Nagoya University of the Arts, East Campus
- Type: Private
- Established: 1970
- Location: Kitanagoya, Aichi, Japan; 35.255°N 136.862°E; 35.256°N 136.881°E
- Website: www.nua.ac.jp/en/

Nagoya University of the Arts (名古屋芸術大学, Nagoya Geijutsu Daigaku) is a private university in Kitanagoya, Aichi, Japan, founded in 1970.
