= Osaka City Museum of Fine Arts =

- 大阪市立美術館
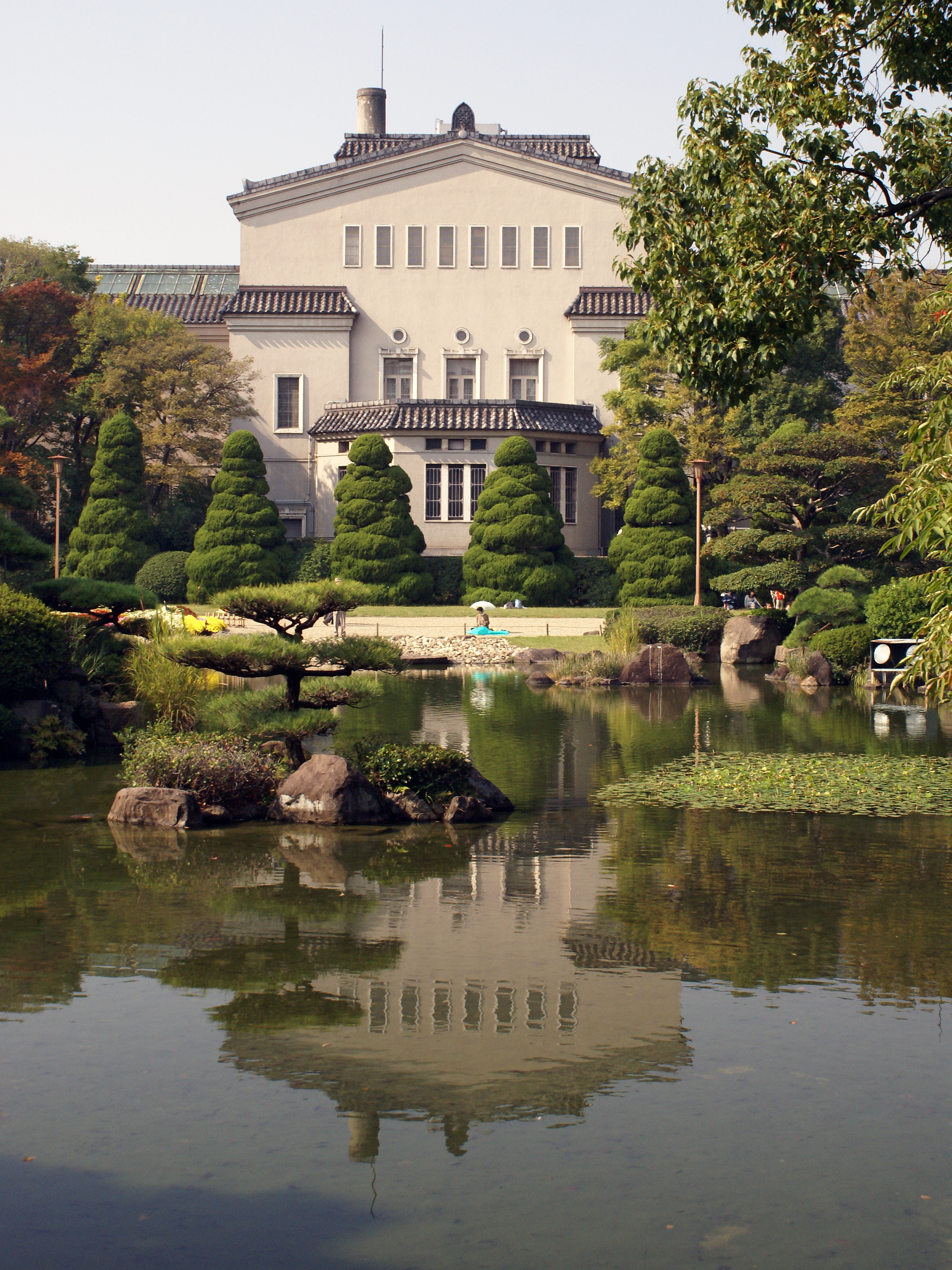
- Exterior of the museum

- Location within Japan
- Interactive fullscreen map
- Established: May 1, 1936
- Location: Osaka, Japan
- Coordinates: 34°39′00″N 135°30′38″E
- Type: Art museum
- Collection size: Over 8400
- Website: osaka-art-museum.jp

The Osaka City Museum of Fine Arts (大阪市立美術館) is a museum located in Tennōji Park, Tennōji-ku, Osaka, Japan. The museum focuses on Japanese and east Asian art.

== Collection ==
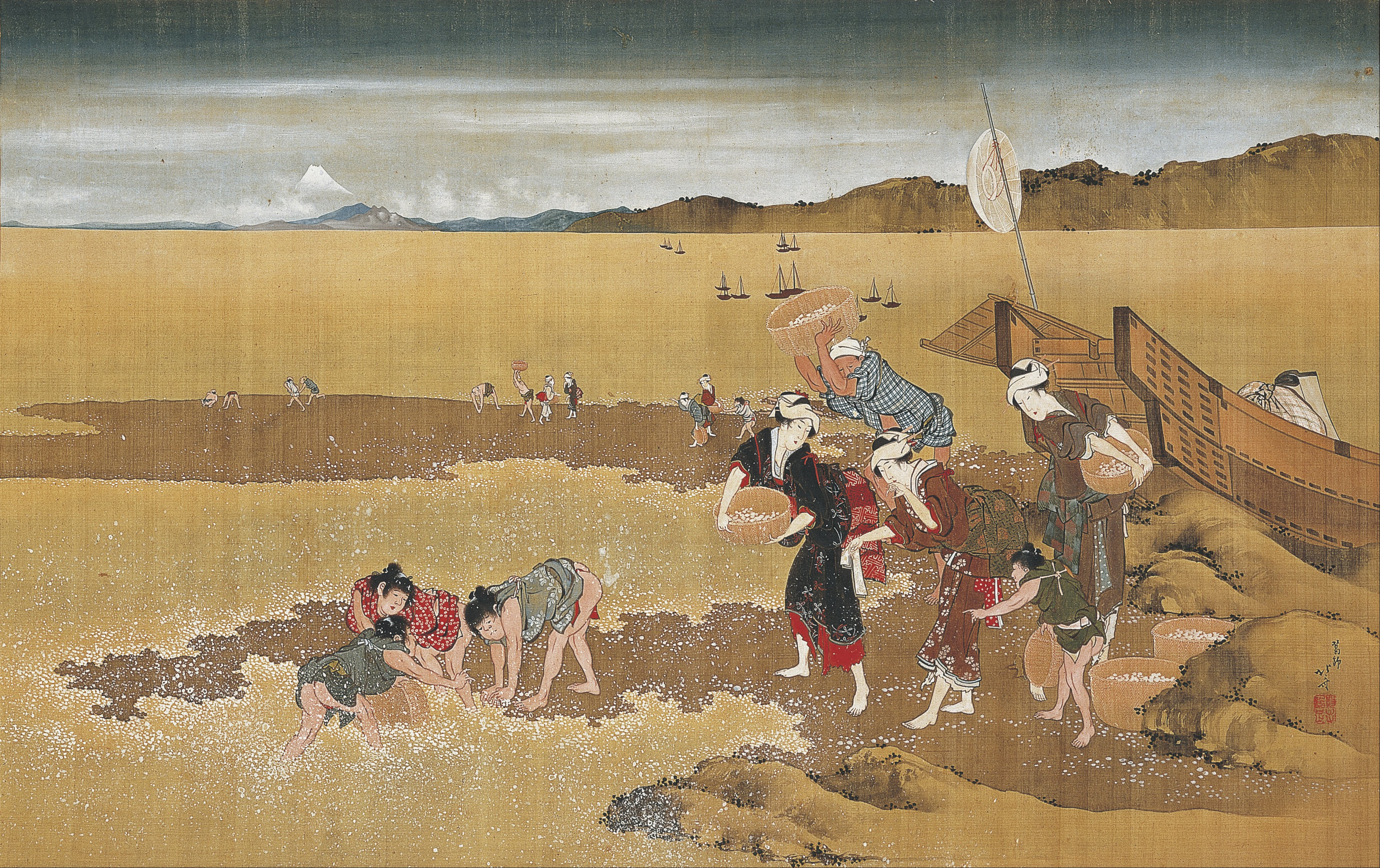
Hokusai, Shell Gathering, 19th century

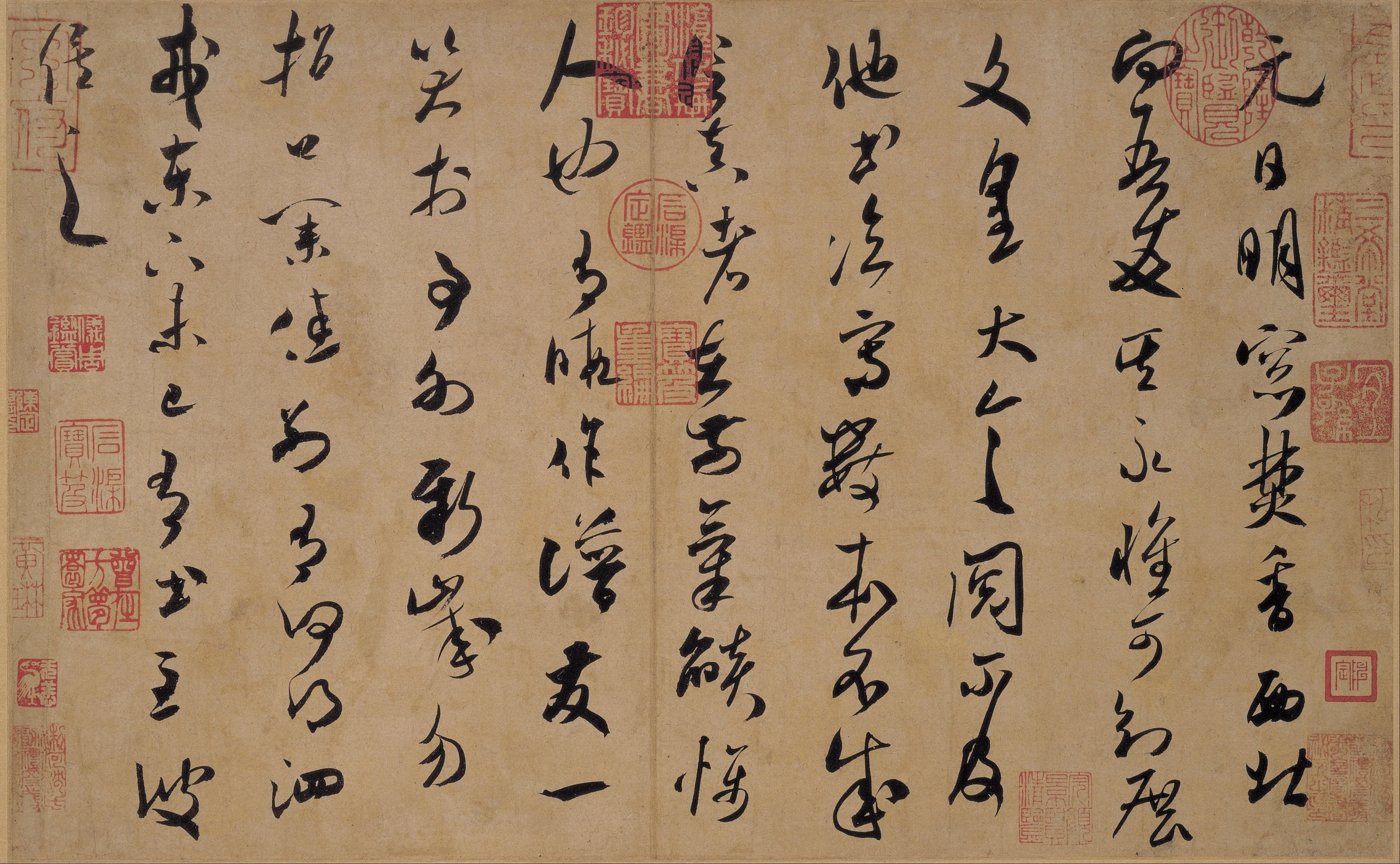
Mi Fu, Calligraphy in Grass Script, late 11th century

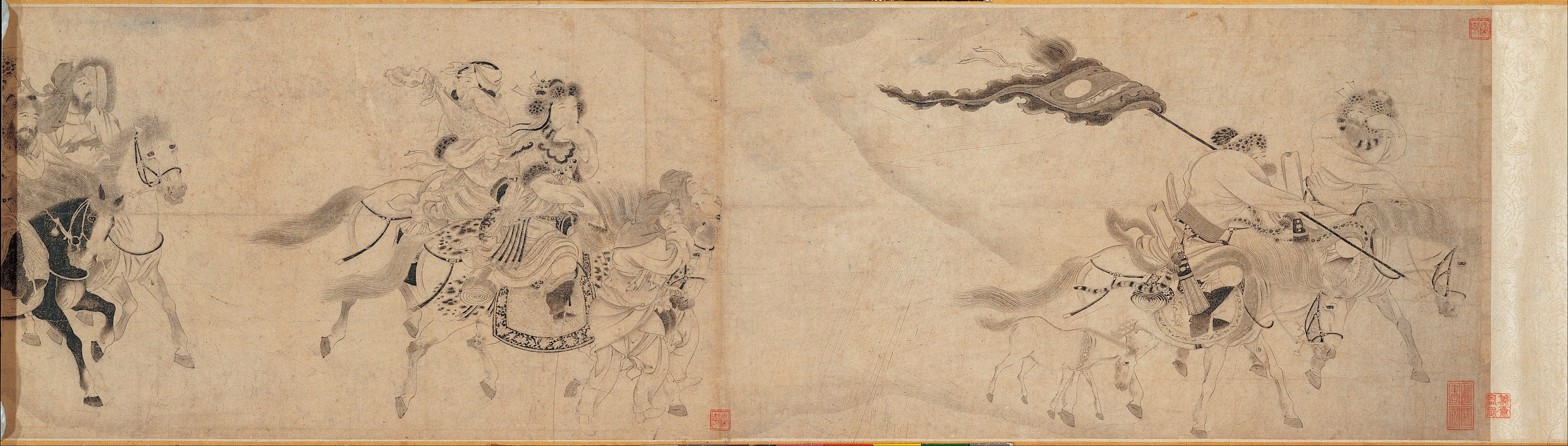
Gong Suran, 12th-13th century

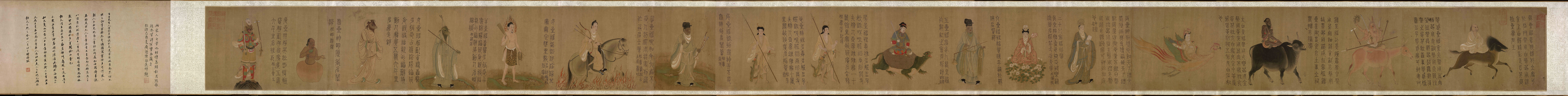
The Five Stars and 28 Heavenly Abodes, Zhang Sengyou, Liang dynasty (5-6th century)

== Access ==
- Osaka Municipal Subway
  - Midosuji Line, Tanimachi Line: Tennoji Station
- JR West
  - Yamatoji Line, Osaka Loop Line, Hanwa Line: Tennoji Station
- Kintetsu
  - Minami Osaka Line: Osaka Abenobashi Station
