= Zhang Sengyou =

Liang dynasty painter

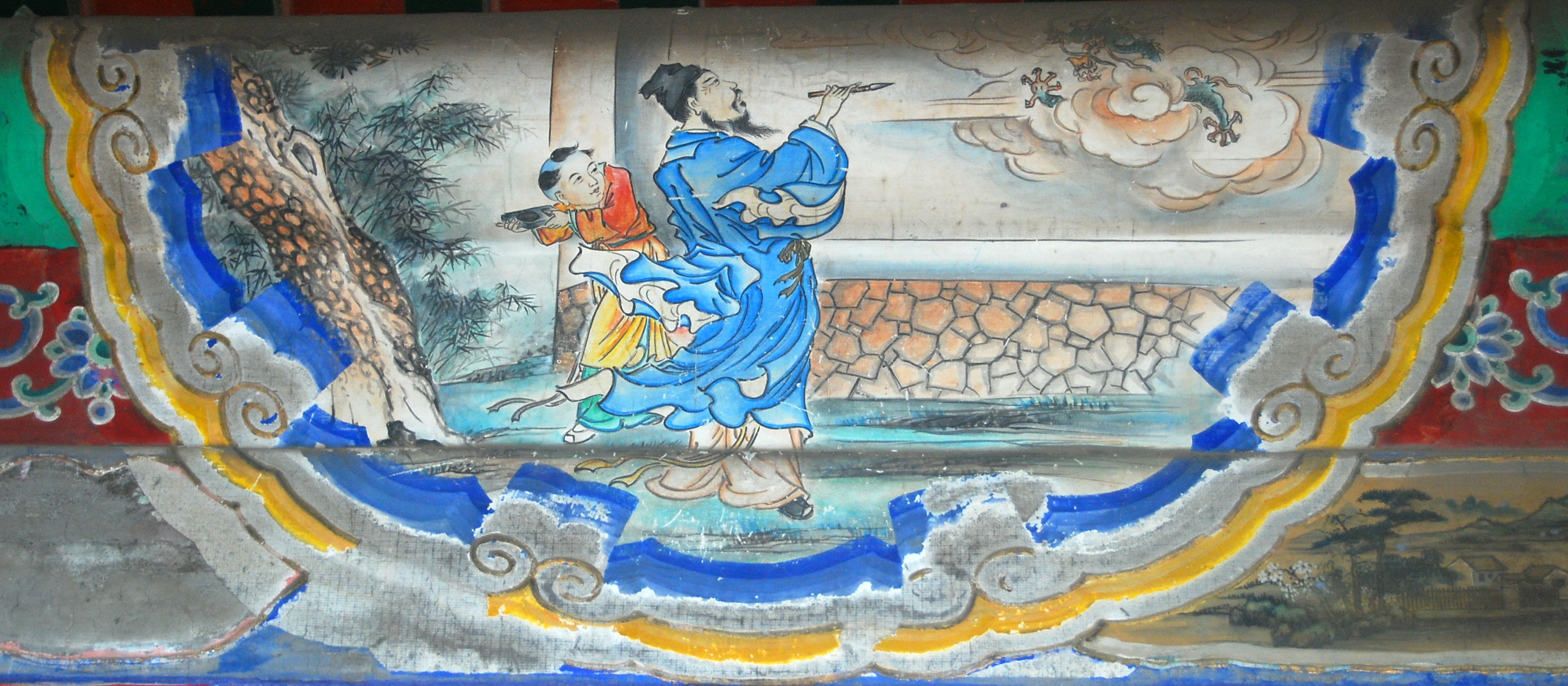
Zhang Sengyao (Long Corridor)

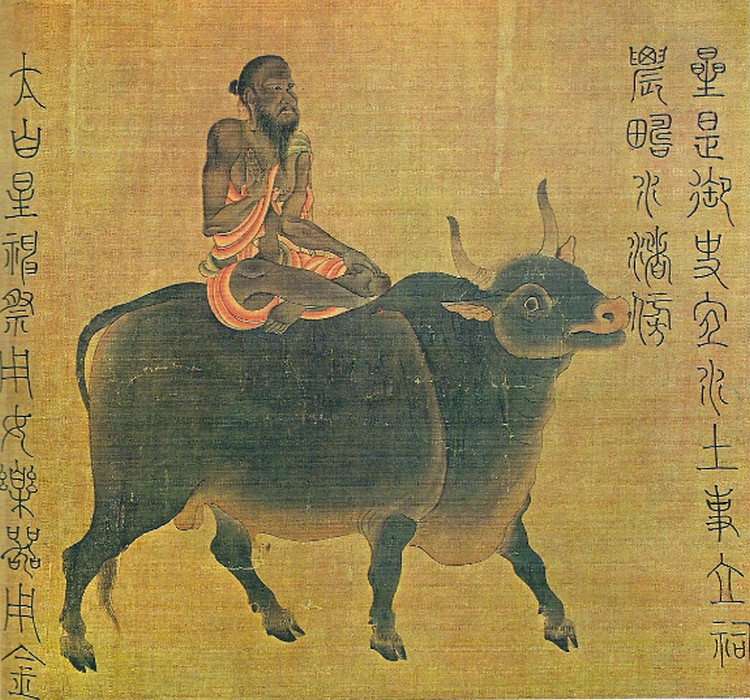
"The personification of the planet Saturn" by Zhang Sengyou (sixth century)

Zhang Sengyou (simplified Chinese: 张僧繇; traditional Chinese: 張僧繇; pinyin: Zhāng Sēngyóu) was a Liang dynasty painter in the ink style in the reign of Emperor Wu of Liang.

His birth and death years are unknown, but he was active c. 490 – c. 540. He was from the Wu Commandery (around present-day Suzhou, Jiangsu).

== Background and reputation ==
Zhang was a member of the Zhang clan of Wu, one of the four prominent clans in Wu Commandery.

According to Tang dynasty art critic Zhang Yanyuan's "Notes of Past Famous Paintings", Zhang served as an official during the reign of Emperor Wu of Liang. He was the director of the imperial library and was also in charge of any painting related affairs in the court of Emperor Wu. Later, Zhang served the country as the general of right flank army and the governor of Wuxing Commandery. His works were rated the finest quality by Zhang Yanyuan. He also listed Zhang's artistic style as one of the four "Standards" of the traditional Chinese paintings; the other three artists were Gu Kaizhi, Lu Tanwei and Wu Daozi.

Yao Zui, a Chen dynasty art critic, described Zhang as a diligent painter who paints "without the notion of day and night".

Zhang was especially skillful in depicting human or animal figures. According to the History of the Southern Dynasties, Zhang painted a portrait for Prince Wuling, one of the sons of Emperor Wu. After viewing his son's portrait, the Emperor was amazed by the resemblance of Zhang's painting to his son.

Buddhism, with all its iconography, came to China from India. Zhang Sengyou, working in the early sixth century, painted large murals of Buddhist shrines in Nanjing. He was one of the first to use these influences with happy results. He was also well known for landscapes, especially snow scenery, with a reputation for the so-called "boneless" technique (mogu).

Zhang is also associated with a famous story. It is said that one day, having painted four dragons on the walls of Anle temple in what is now Nanjing, he did not draw the eyes. He believed they were so realistic that if he dotted the eyes, they would come alive and fly away. People thought this was absurd, and Zhang painted in the eyes of two dragons, causing the dragons to immediately flee to heaven riding on clouds with crashing thunder. This story is summarized in the chengyu “to draw a dragon and dot in the eyes” (traditional Chinese: 畫龍點睛; simplified Chinese: 画龙点睛; pinyin: huàlóng-diǎnjīng), and is used in Chinese to describe a work that is one step from perfection, or to put on the finishing touches.

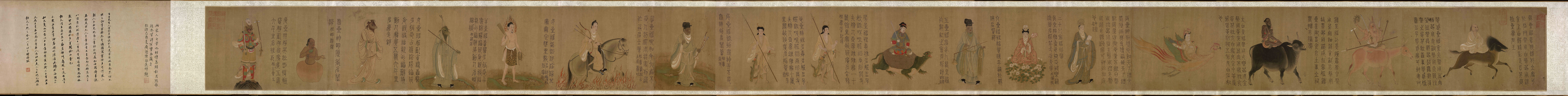
"The Five Stars and 28 Heavenly Abodes" Osaka City Museum of Fine Arts
