= Nishiharu, Aichi =

Dissolved municipality in Aichi prefecture, Japan

Nishiharu (西春町, Nishiharu-chō) was a town located in Nishikasugai District, Aichi Prefecture, Japan.

As of 2003, the town had an estimated population of 33,752 and a density of 3,381.96 persons per km^{2}. The total area was 9.98 km^{2}.

On March 20, 2006, Nishiharu, along with the town of Shikatsu (also Nishikasugai District), was merged to create the city of Kitanagoya.
