= Yun Bing =

Chinese painter

- 惲冰
- Born: Wujin District, Changzhou
- Notable work: Hairpin Scroll (簪花图轴) (1735–1796), Quiet Provisions of the Studio (书房清供图) (1735–1796)
- Style: Bird-and-flower painting, "Boneless" technique
- Spouse: Mao Hongtiao (毛鸿调)

Chinese name
- Traditional Chinese: 惲冰
- Simplified Chinese: 恽冰
Transcriptions
Standard Mandarin
- Hanyu Pinyin: Yùn Bīng
- Wade–Giles: Yün Ping

Qingyu
- Chinese: 清於
Transcriptions
Standard Mandarin
- Hanyu Pinyin: Qīngyū
- Wade–Giles: Ch'ing-yü

Yun Bing (Chinese: 惲冰, dates unknown), courtesy names Qingyu (Chinese: 清於) and Haoru (Chinese: 浩如), was a Chinese painter during the Qianlong era. She is well known for her bird-and-flower paintings executing the "boneless" technique, and became the most famed of the Yun family's female artists.

== Biography ==
Yun was born to an artistic family in Wujin District of Changzhou, the granddaughter of the famed painter Yun Shouping. Her niece Yun Zhu was also a talented artists. Though her birth and death dates are unknown, one of her paintings in the Shanghai Museum is dated to 1750. She married Mao Hongtiao, also from Wujin, and the two sold paintings and wrote poetry to support their family. One of Yun's granddaughters, named Zhou (Chinese: 周), was recorded in the Yun family genealogy book, which has been used to suggest that her artistic skills were worthy of the Yun clan.

== Art ==
Yun's painting style was heavily influenced by her family's preference for the "boneless" technique. She predominantly painted bird-and-flower paintings, but also painted people, one of which depicts a woman doing her hair known as the Hairpin Scroll (簪花图轴). Yun is often compared with her contemporary Ma Quan, who similarly specialised in bird-and-flower painting but favoured strong outlines. The Chuyue jiexu wenjian lu (初月接续闻见录), compiled in 1818, describes how people throughout the Jiangnan region described them as the "two without parallel" (Chinese: 两绝)

During his tenure as governor-general of Liangjiang, Yi Jishan presented some of Yun's works to Empress Dowager Chongqing who in turn showed them to the Qianlong Emperor. The emperor was reportedly so impressed that he wrote a poem praising her art, after which Yun's reputation as a painter spread.

== Gallery ==
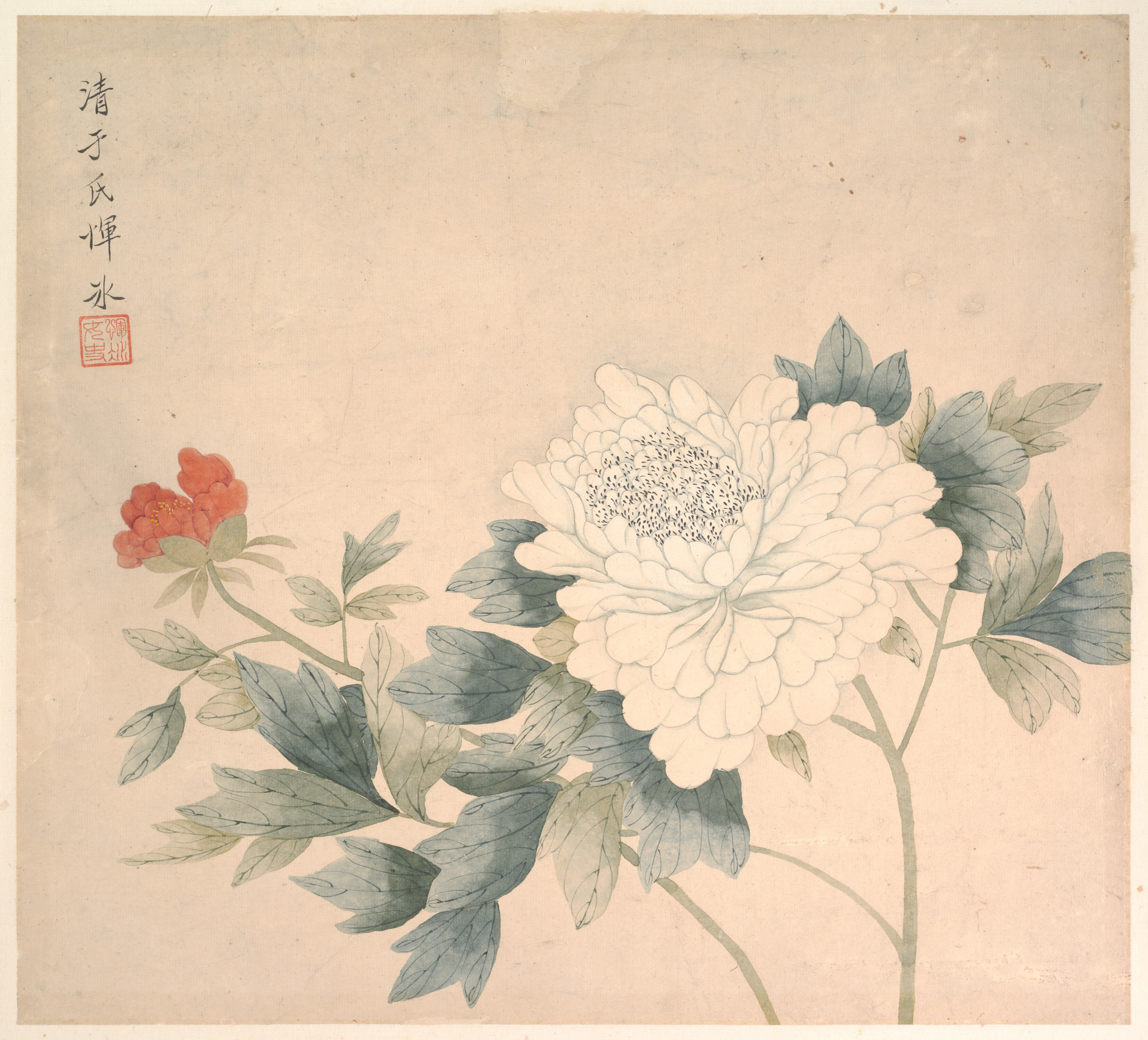
Flower Study (花卉圖), Metropolitan Museum of Art

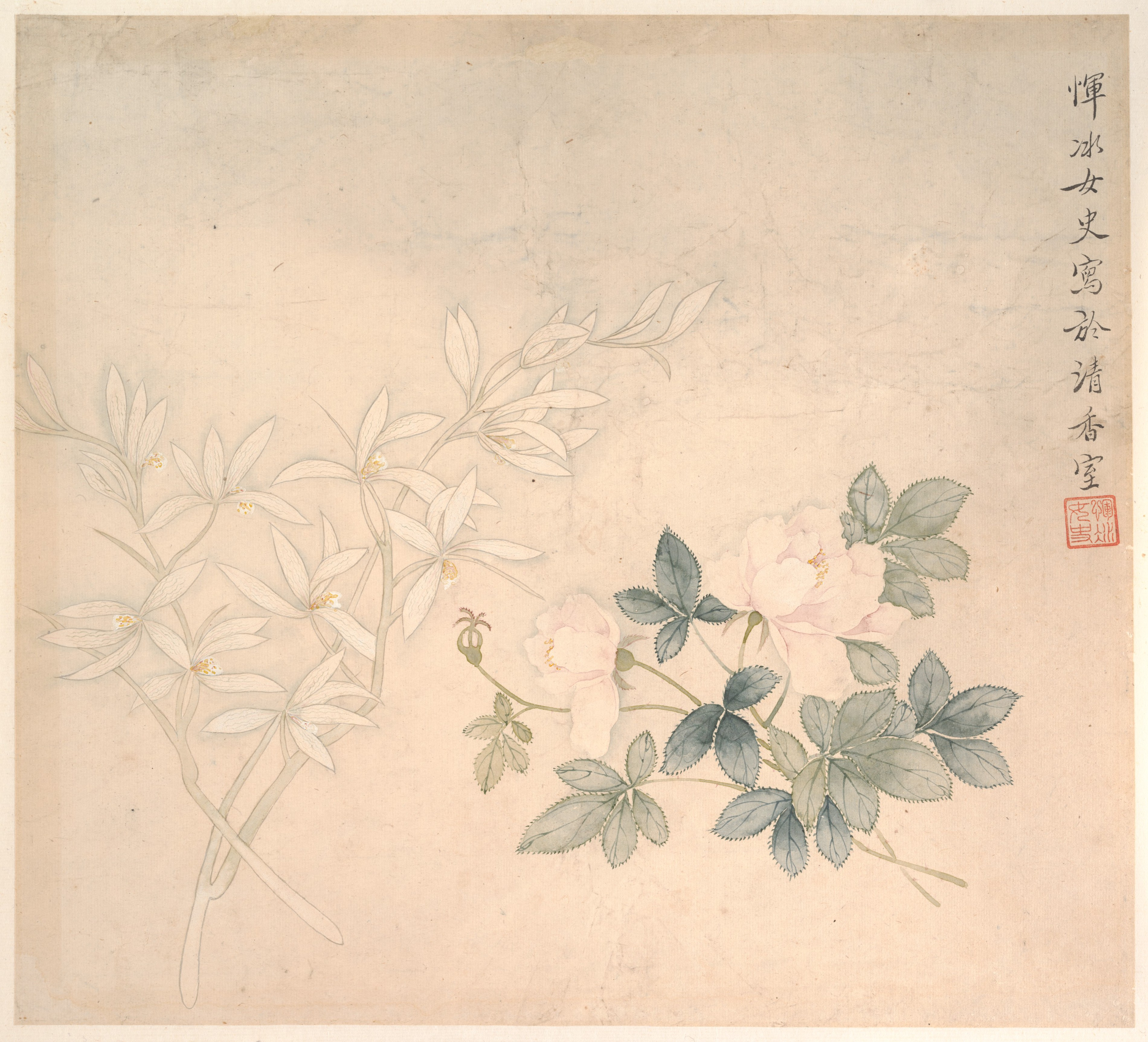
Flower Study (花卉圖), Metropolitan Museum of Art
