= Kitanagoya =

Kitanagoya 北名古屋市
- City
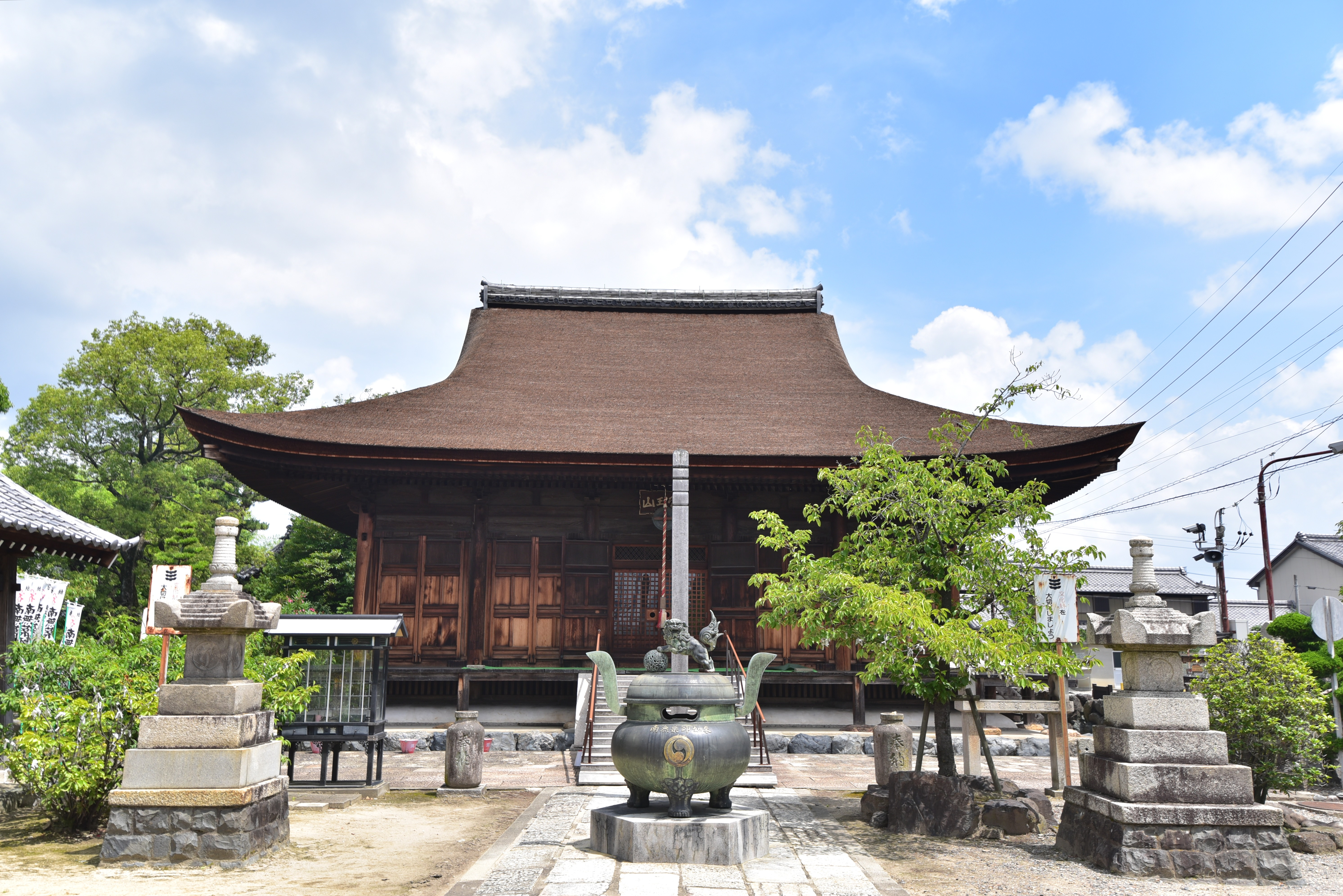
- Kodenji-Temple

- Flag Emblem

- Location of Kitanagoya in Aichi Prefecture

- Coordinates: 35°14′44.3″N 136°51′57.4″E
- Country: Japan
- Region: Chūbu (Tōkai)
- Prefecture: Aichi
- Town Settled in Nishiharu: November 1, 1963
- Town Settled in Shikatsu: April 1, 1961
- merged and city settled: March 20, 2006

Government
  - Mayor: Tamotsu Nagase

Area
  - Total: 18.37 km^{2} (7.09 sq mi)

Population (October 1, 2019)
  - Total: 86,068
  - Density: 4,685/km^{2} (12,130/sq mi)
- Time zone: UTC+9 (Japan Standard Time)
  - Tree: Osmanthus
  - Flower: Azalea
- Phone number: 0568-22-1111
- Address: 15 Shimizuda, Nishinoho, Kitanagoya-shi, Aichi-ken 481-8531
- Website: Official website

Kitanagoya (北名古屋市, Kitanagoya-shi) is a city in Aichi Prefecture, Japan. As of 1 October 2019, the city had an estimated population of 86,068 in 36,904 households, and a population density of 4,685 inhabitants per square kilometre (12,130/sq mi). The total area of the city is 18.37 square kilometres (7.09 sq mi). Kitanagoya is a member of the World Health Organization’s Alliance for Healthy Cities (AFHC).

== Geography ==
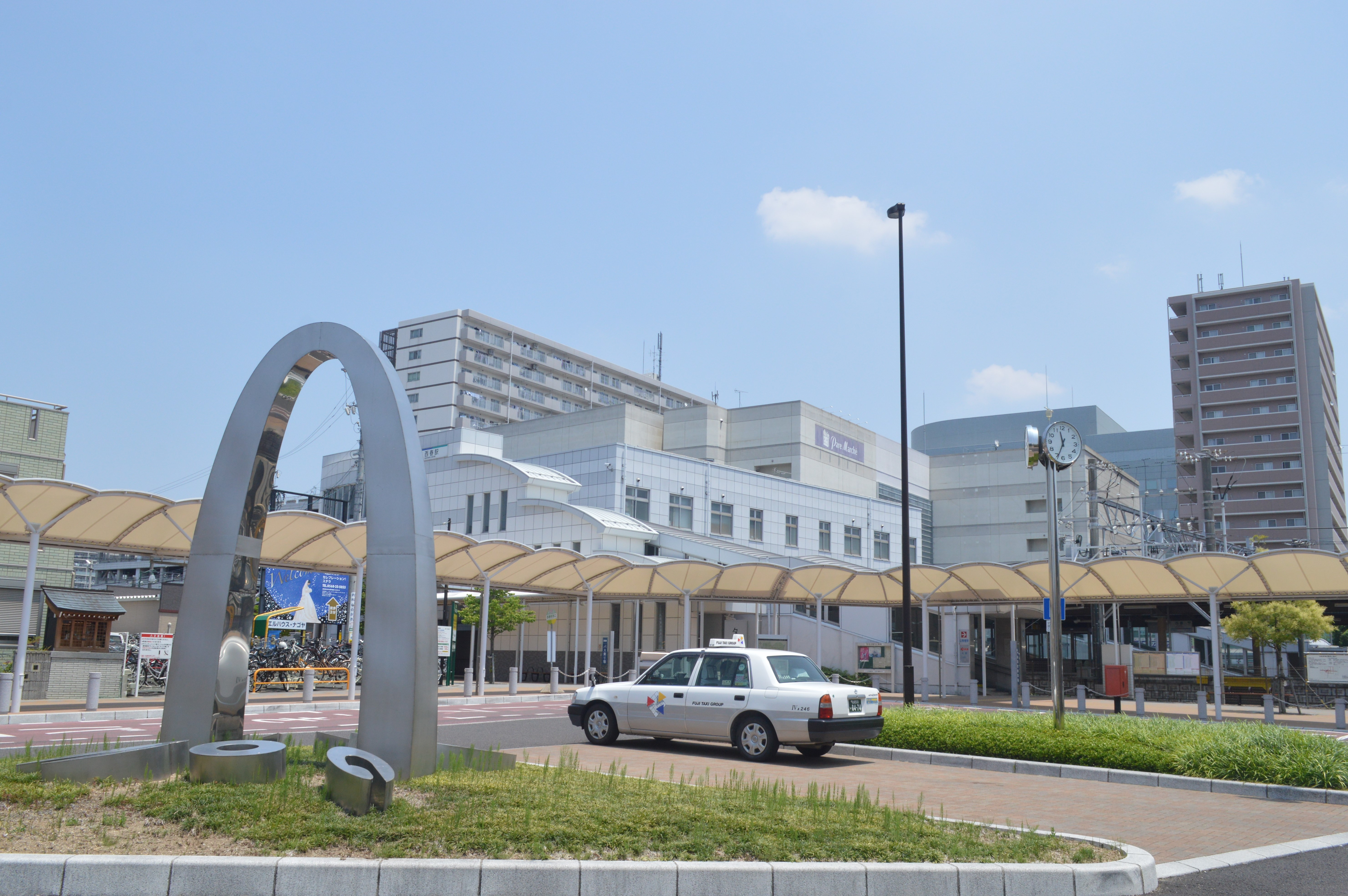
Downtown of Kitanagoya

Kitanagoya is located in the northwest region of Aichi Prefecture. The city lies within a 10 kilometers range of downtown Nagoya and is relatively small. The city is about 6 kilometers from east to west, and about 4 kilometers from north to south. The city is located in the heart of Nōbi Plain, approximately five meters above sea level. There are numerous rivers, including the Gojō River, Shin River, and Aise River, which create a natural biosphere.

=== Climate ===
The city has a climate characterized by hot and humid summers, and relatively mild winters (Köppen climate classification Cfa). The average annual temperature in Kitanagoya is 15.7 °C. The average annual rainfall is 1718 mm with September as the wettest month. The temperatures are highest on average in August, at around 28.2 °C, and lowest in January, at around 4.3 °C.

=== Demographics ===
Per Japanese census data, the population of Kitanagoya has increased rapidly over the past 60 years.

Historical population
Year	Pop.	±%
1960	16,847	—
1970	46,740	+177.4%
1980	69,078	+47.8%
1990	72,582	+5.1%
2000	75,728	+4.3%
2010	81,550	+7.7%

=== Surrounding municipalities ===
- Aichi Prefecture
  - Ichinomiya
  - Iwakura
  - Kiyosu
  - Komaki
  - Nagoya
  - Toyoyama

== History ==
=== Late modern period ===
The area of present-day Kitanagoya was part of rural Nishikasugai District, Aichi from 1889. The area began to develop in the Taishō period with the development of the Meitetsu Inuyama train line.

=== Contemporary history ===
The town of Shikatsu was created on April 1, 1961, followed by Nishiharu on November 1, 1963, as the population increased due to increasing industrialization of the area. The two towns were merged to create the city of Kitanagoya on March 20, 2006.

== Government ==
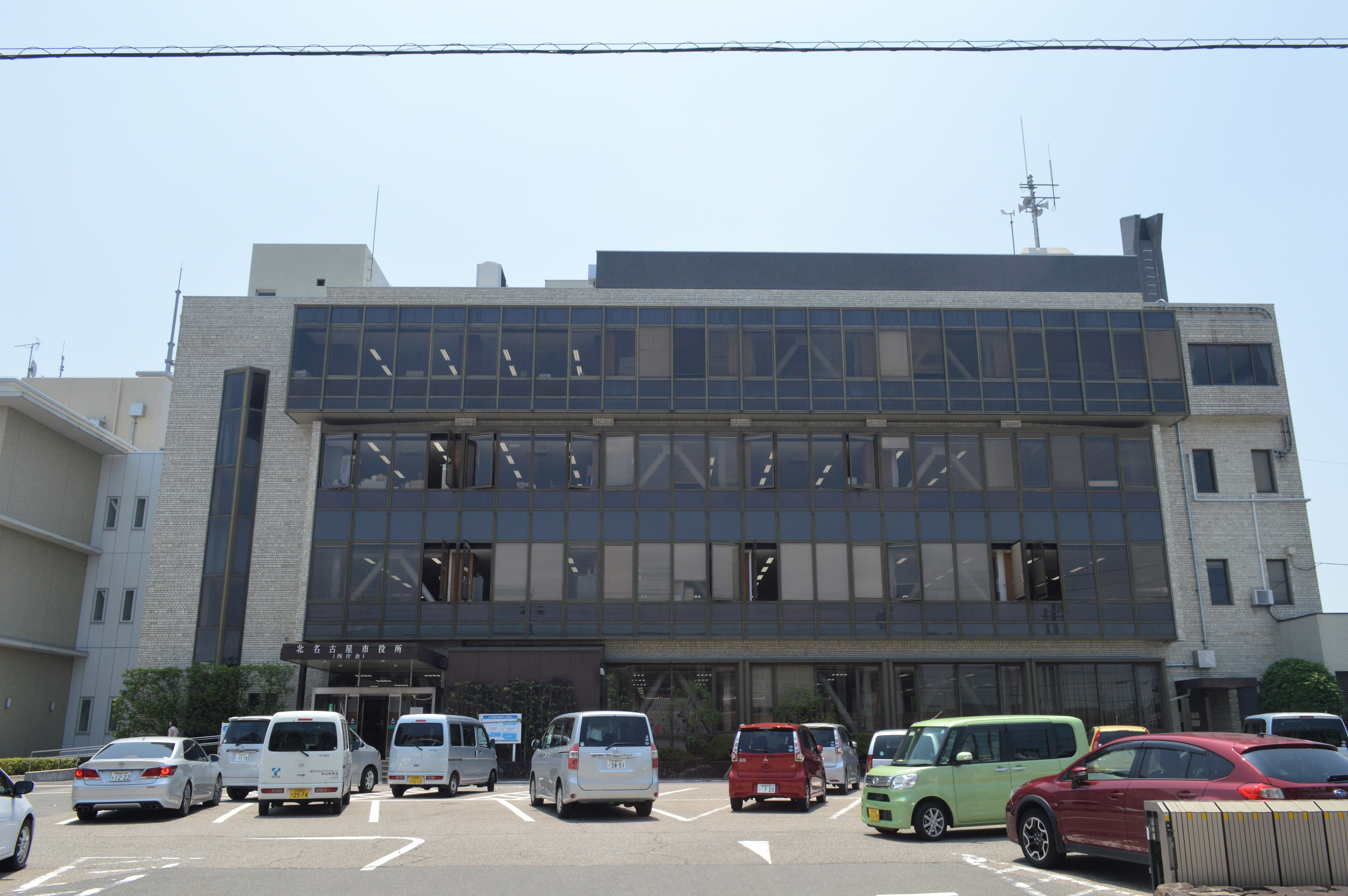
Kitanagoya City Hall West branch

Kitanagoya has a mayor-council form of government with a directly elected mayor and a unicameral city legislature of 21 members. The city contributes two members to the Aichi Prefectural Assembly. In terms of national politics, the city is part of Aichi District 5 of the lower house of the Diet of Japan.

== Sister cities ==
- Muan County, South Jeolla Province, South Korea, since January 9, 2008

== Economy ==
Due to its location adjacent to the Nagoya metropolis, which is only ten minutes away by express train, Kitanagoya is largely a commuter town. However, agriculture is also highly developed, using the productive fertile soil and land with an alluvial fan created by Kiso and Shōnai River.

== Education ==
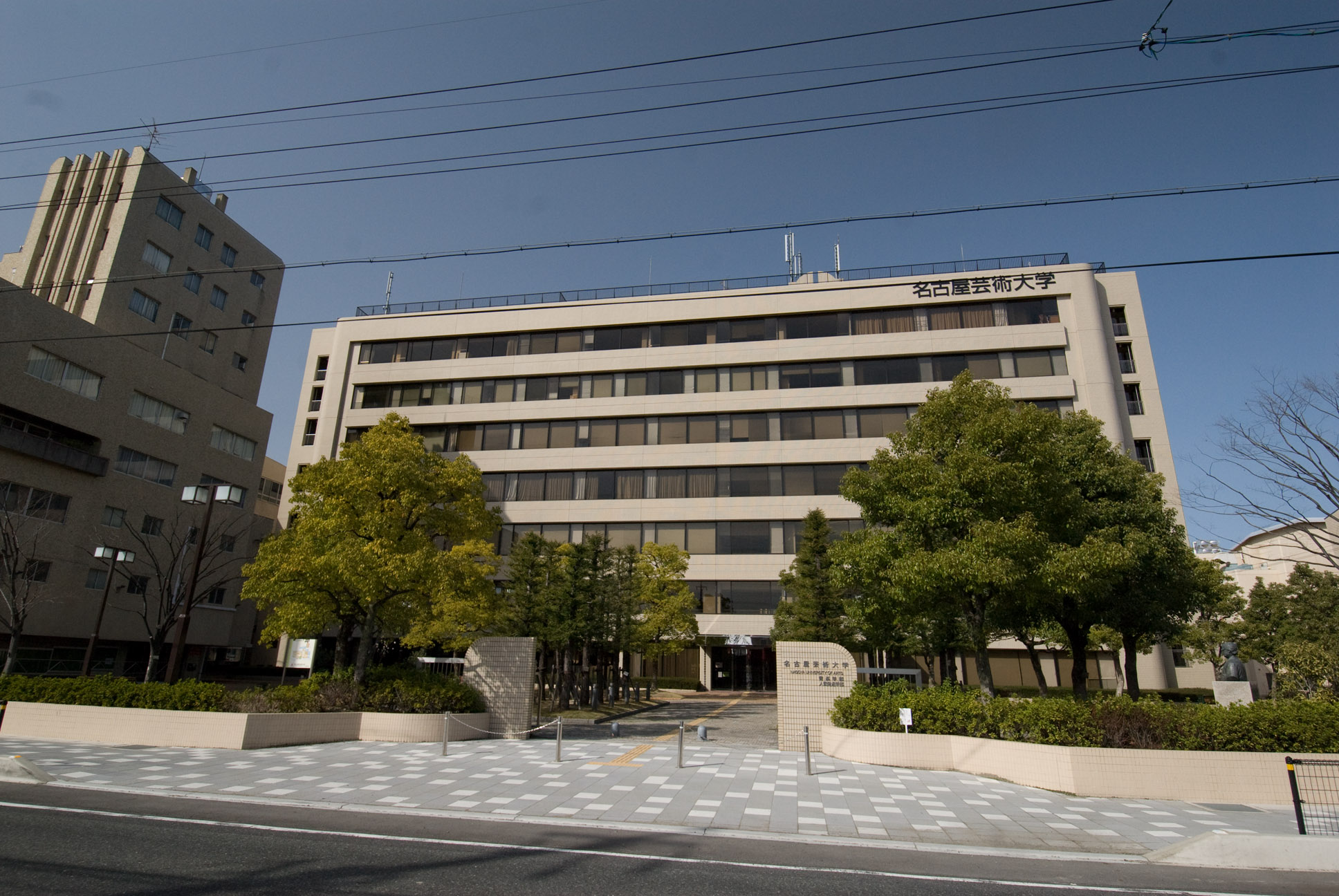
Nagoya University of Arts

=== University ===
The Nagoya University of Arts is also located in Kitanagoya.

- Nagoya University of Arts

=== Schools ===
Kitanagoya has ten public elementary schools and six public junior high schools operated by the city government, and one public high school operated by the Aichi Prefectural Board of Education.

== Transportation ==
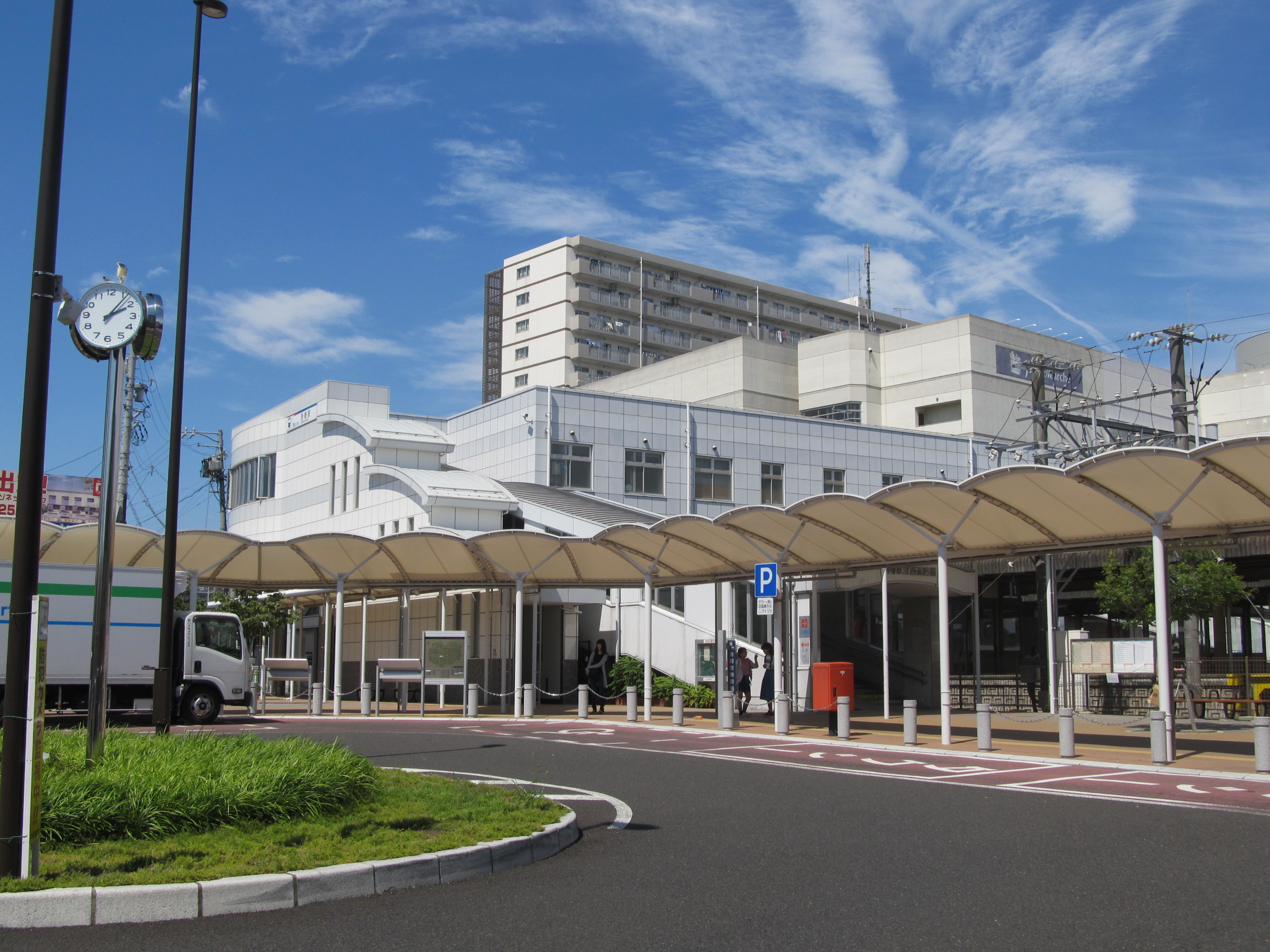
Nishiharu Station

=== Railways ===
==== Conventional lines ====
Meitetsu

- Inuyama Line: - Nishiharu – Tokushige-Nagoya-Geidai –

=== Roads ===
==== Expressway ====
- Route 16 (Nagoya Expressway)

==== Japan National Route ====
- National Route 22

== Notable people from Kitanagoya ==
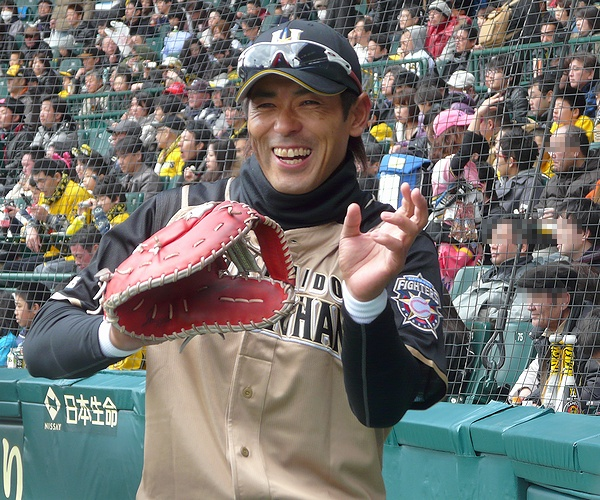
Atsunori Inaba

- Kiyoshi Hatanaka, professional boxer
- Atsunori Inaba, professional baseball player
- Takuya Ishida, actor
