= Tianjin Museum =

Museum in Tianjin, China

Coordinates: 39.086062°N 117.201532°E

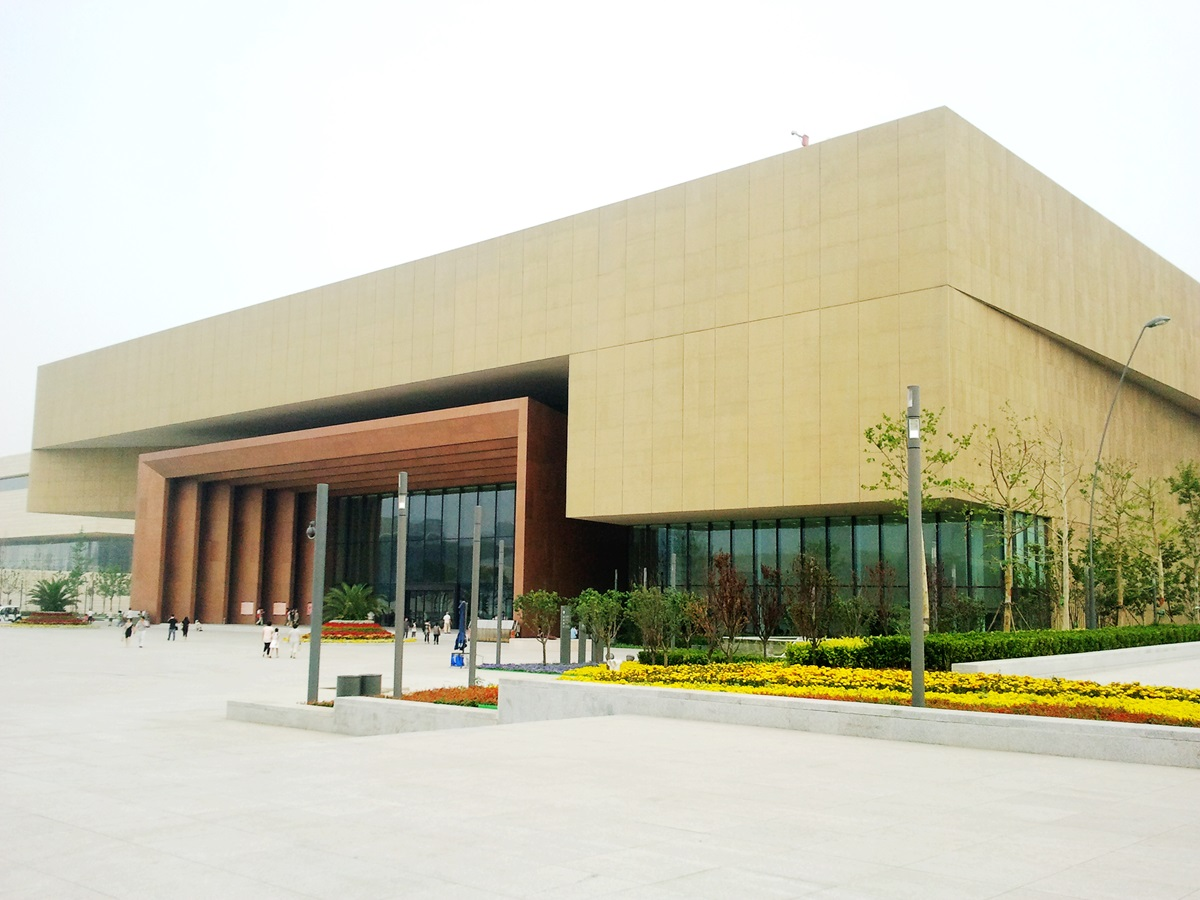
- Established: 2006
- Location: Tianjin, China
- Director: Chen Zhuo
- Website: www.tjbwg.com

The Tianjin Museum (Chinese: 天津博物馆; pinyin: Tiānjīn Bówùguǎn) is the largest museum in Tianjin, China, exhibiting a range of cultural and historical relics significant to Tianjin. The museum lies in Yinhe Plaza in the Hexi District of Tianjin and covers an area of about 50,000 sq metres. The unique architectural style of the museum, whose appearance resembles that of a swan spreading its wings, has meant that it is quickly becoming one of the city's iconic buildings. The museum was designed by the Japanese architect Mamoru Kawaguchi and constructed by Shin Takamatsu Architect and Associates.

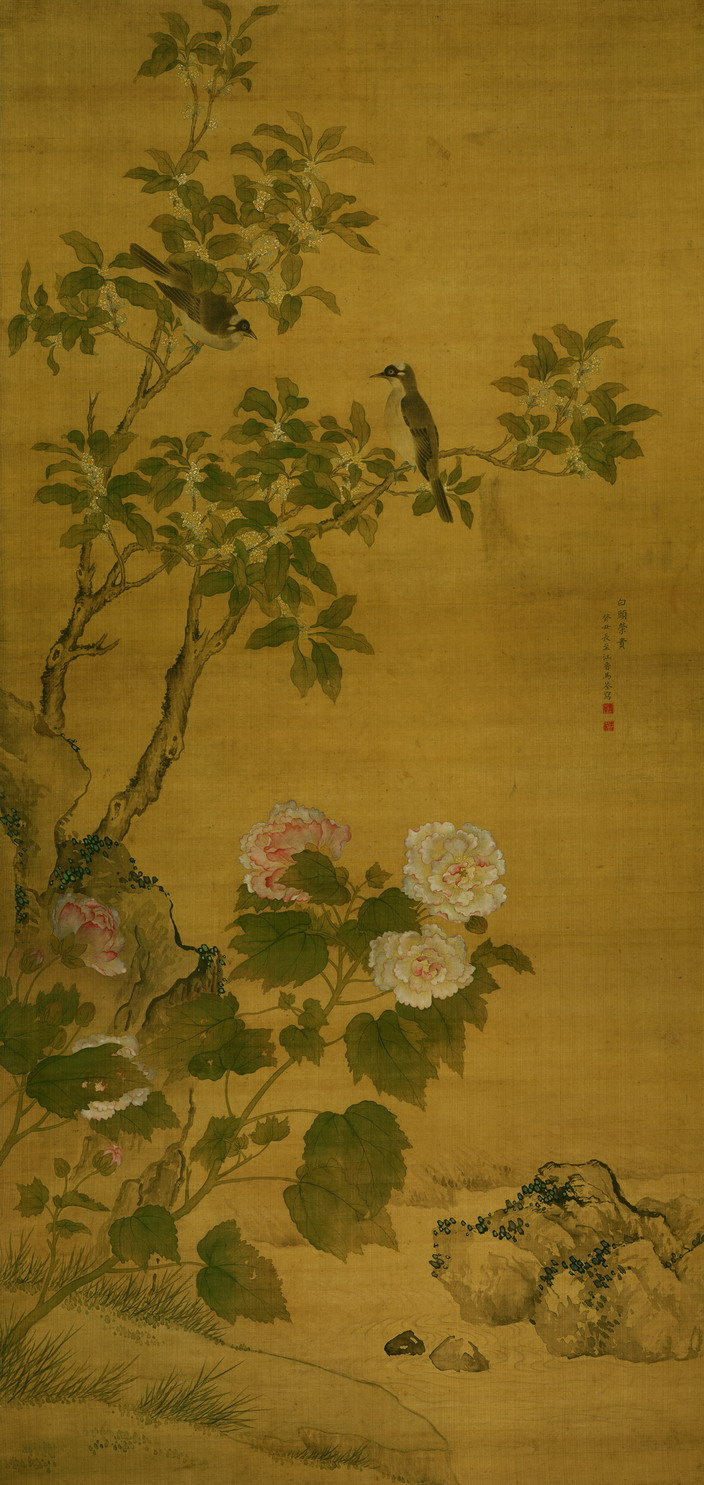
Eighteenth century painting by Ma Quan, The White Head's Honour and Glory (白头荣贵图), held in the Tianjin Museum.

The Tianjin Museum has an extensive collection of ancient Chinese fine arts and exhibits on Tianjin's history. There are nearly 200,000 collections of art and relics, including calligraphy, paintings, bronzeware, ceramics, jadeware, seals, inkstone, Jiagu (bones or tortoise shells with inscriptions of the Shang Dynasty), coins, historic documents and relics of modern times.

== See also ==
- List of museums in China
