= Shikatsu, Aichi =

Dissolved municipality in Aichi prefecture, Japan

Shikatsu (師勝町, Shikatsu-chō) was a town located in Nishikasugai District, Aichi Prefecture, Japan.

== Population ==
As of 2003, the town has an estimated population of 43,299 and a density of 5,160.79 persons per km^{2}. The total area is 8.39 km^{2}.

== History ==
On March 20, 2006, Shikatsu, along with the town of Nishiharu (also Nishikasugai District), was merged to create the city of Kitanagoya.
