= Mogu =

Technique in traditional Chinese painting

Mogu (Chinese: 沒骨) is a painting skill or technique in traditional Chinese painting. It literally means "boneless". In these paintings, forms are made by ink and color washes rather than by outlines.

== Etymology ==
There are mainly two derivatives:

- Mogu-Hua (Traditional Chinese: 沒骨畫, or 沒骨畵; Simplified Chinese: 没骨画; Pinyin: Mògǔ Huà; "Huà" means "to paint"), mainly mentions the painting or work has such style or created by such technique.
- Mogu-Fa (Traditional Chinese: 沒骨法; Simplified Chinese: 没骨法; Pinyin: Mògǔ Fǎ; "Fǎ" means method or technique) emphasizes the technique.

== History ==
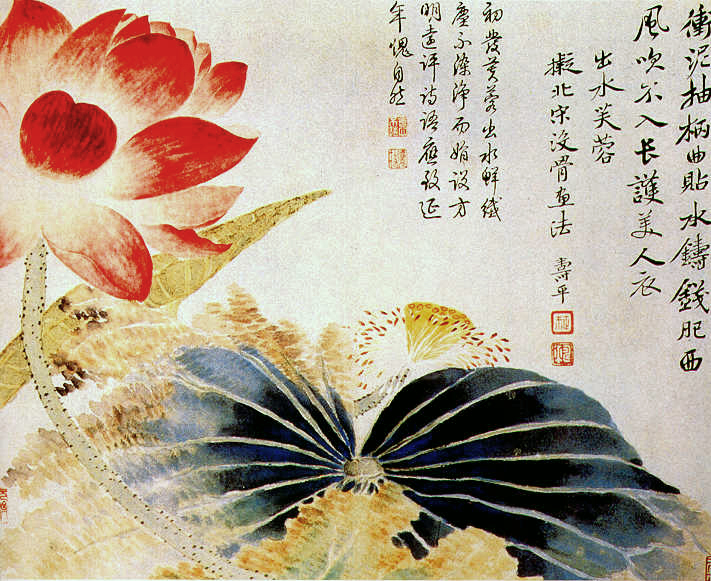
Yun Shouping's Mogu painting: Lotus Flower Breaking the Surface (出水芙蓉圖) (Palace Museum, Beijing)

According to some ancient records, the technique was first created and theorized by Zhang Sengyou of the Liang dynasty in 557 during the Southern dynasties period.

During the period of the Five Dynasties and Ten Kingdoms period, a painter named Huang Quan (黄筌) from Former Shu significantly developed the techniques in bird-and-flower painting, especially in painting trees and flowers, and his painting was called as the fine-sounding name Mogu Huazhi (沒骨花枝).

During the Tang dynasty, notable painters mastered this technique includes Yang Sheng (楊升).

Xu Chongsi (徐崇嗣) during the Northern Song dynasty continued developing the technique from Huang, and his paintings were named Mogu-Tu (沒骨圖). Xu started applying this technique in shan shui painting.

The technique gained popularity during the Late-Ming dynasty and Qing dynasty, and the most famous master would be Yun Shouping.

== Technique ==
The method mainly is a staining and dying one, by using ink brush pens. Less or absolutely no sketch or drawing, so people can hardly observe solid lines or curves in the painting.

There are basically three Mogu staining methods: the staining by smearing (渲染; Xuàn-Rǎn), the staining by dotting (点染; Diǎn-Rǎn), and the staining by just filling colours (填染; Tián-Rǎn).

== See also ==
- Yun Shouping: widely regarded as the top Mogu painter.
- Mogu painting is mainly applied in:
  - Chinese painting
  - Danqing
  - Ink wash painting
  - Shan shui painting
  - Blue-green shan shui painting
  - Bird-and-flower painting
