= Yun Zhu =

Chinese poet and painter

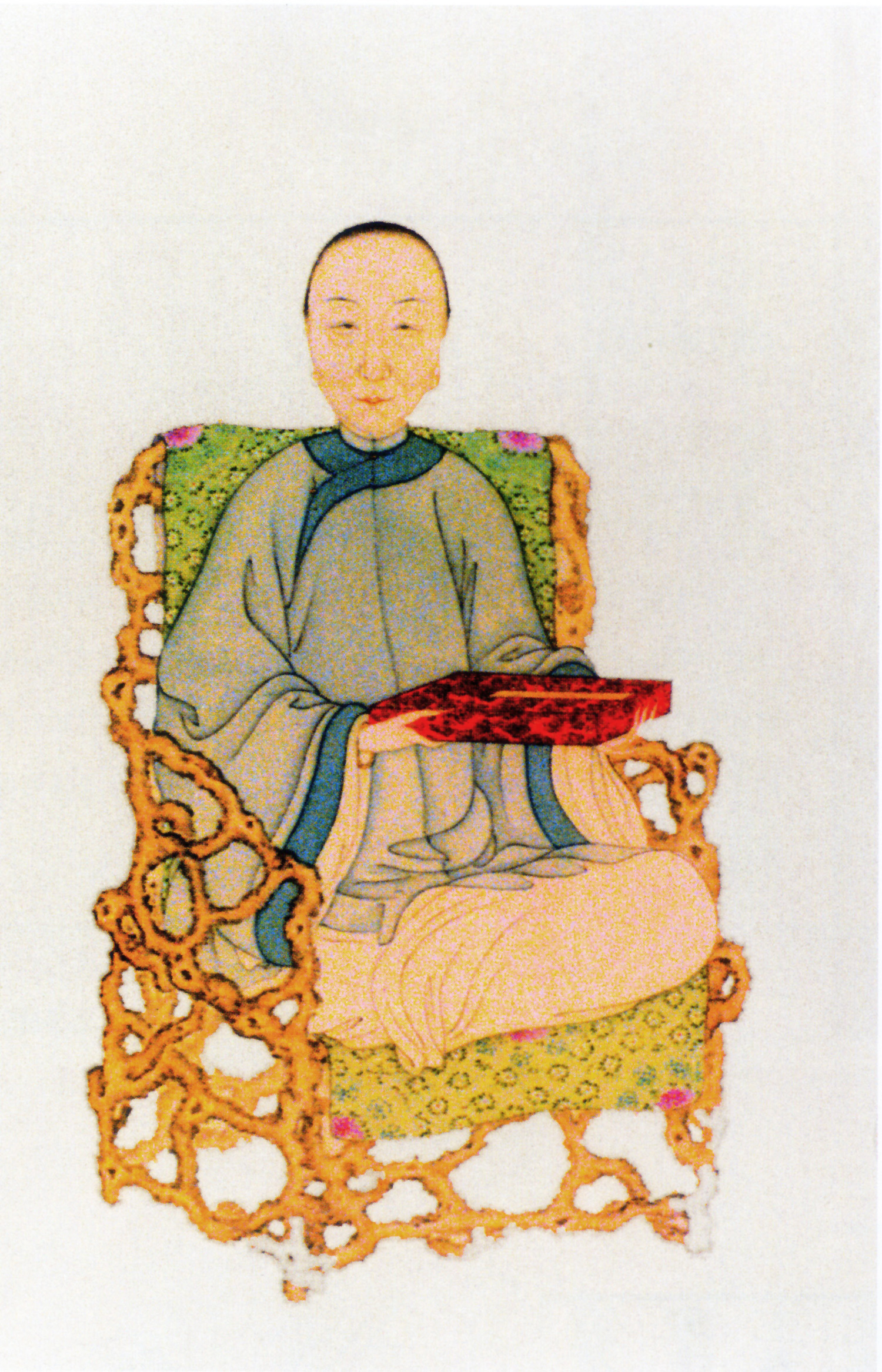
- Born: Yun Zhu; 29 July 1771; Yanghu, Changzhou province
- Died: 1 June 1833 (aged 61)
- Spouse: Wanyan Tinglu
- Children: 4

Yun Zhu (惲珠) or Wanyan Yun Zhu (完顏惲珠) aka Adept of the Lotus Lake (蓉湖散人) (29 July 1771 – 1 June 1833) was a Qing dynasty poet, painter, anthologist and moralist. She gathered together thousands of poems written by hundreds of women.

== Life ==
She was born in 1771 into an artistic family in Yanghu in Changzhou. Her aunt, Yun Bing, was a skilled artist. and her great grandfather, Yun Shouping, was a renowned painter. During her birth her grandmother had a dream that a stranger gave her a large shining pearl. Taking this as a sign she was called "Zhu" the word for pearl.

Her father was a jailer but she married Wanyan Tinglu who was a Manchu aristocrat. They had four children Wanyan Linqing in 1791, Wanyan Linchang in 1792, Wanyan Linshu in 1794 and a daughter the following year.

She wrote and collected poems. Her favourite son Linqing discovered that his mother had collected over 3,000 poems by women during her childhood and as an adult. Possibly without her consent Linqing arranged for some to published in 1814. Yun was annoyed as she felt that only poems intended for posterity should be published. Her Drafts poems and Lyrics from Hongxiang Library went to be reprinted in 1866 and 1928.

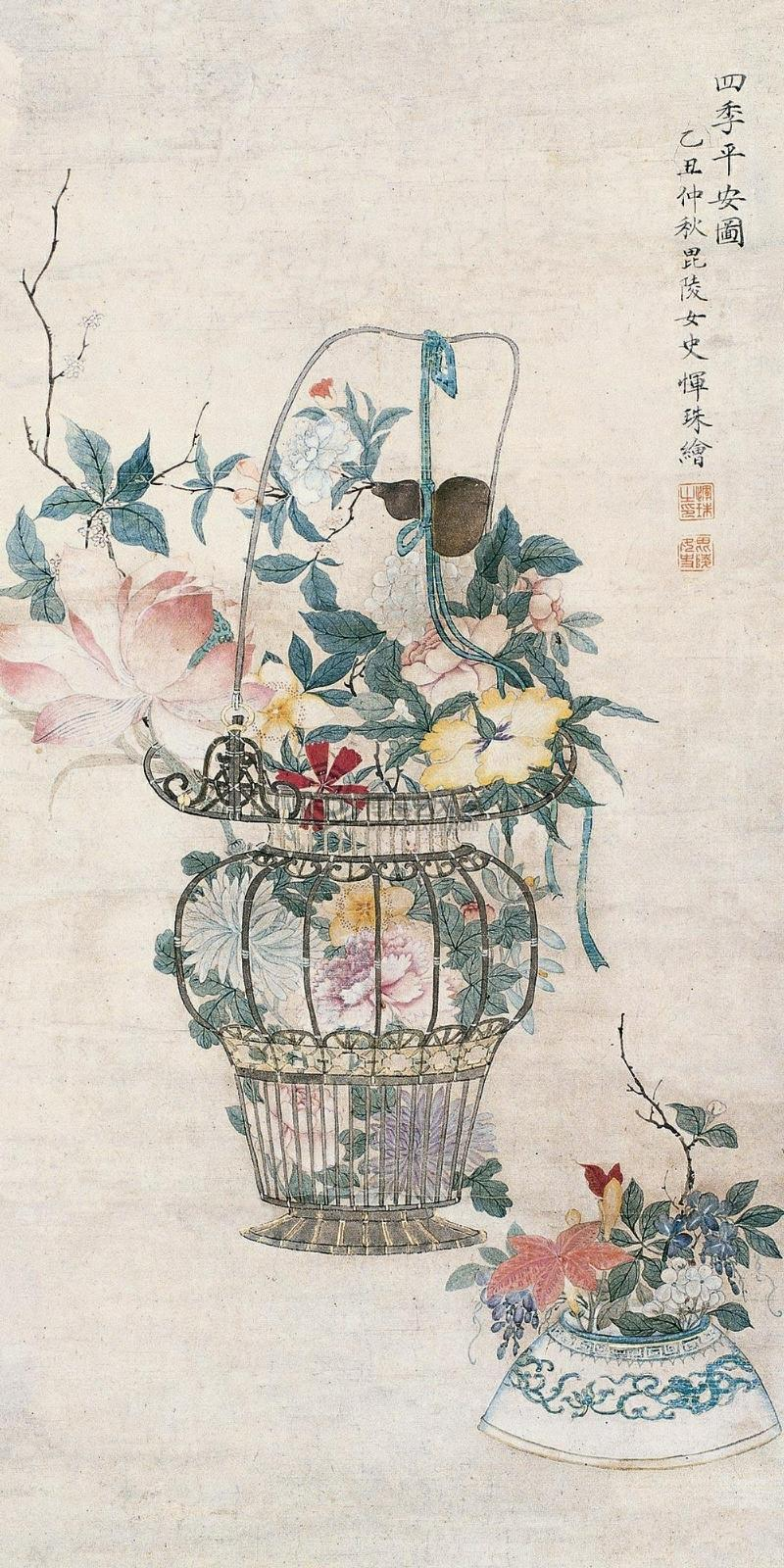
A painting by Yun Zhu

She restarted her life at the age of 50 following the death of her husband in 1820, the year before. She took a pen name of Adept of the Lotus Lake. She went to live with her son and this meant that we know of her life from his autobiography. He was an expert in water conservation in Anhui province. When he moved from the Huizhou prefecture, she wanted to travel via the sights of Xin'an, so she wanted a route through the Dahong mountain. Linqing obliged and he led the way giving her a commentary. Linqing decided to get a painting made of her following his lead up steep mountain paths in a sedan chair.

Her pre-eminent work was a book of poetry called Women's Poetry: anthology for a Correct Beginning. The book included 933 different authors and 1,700 poems. It took twenty years to complete and it included poets from Korea and Mongolia. Yun was able to travel widely as accompanied her father on his business trips. The proof reading of the book was completed by her granddaughters and her daughters in law.

She was known as "Dame dowager of the first rank" and had been given other honours by the Imperial court. She taught three sons and fourteen grandchildren before she died in 1833. She died without her favourite son as he had been ordered by the emperor to become the Governor of Guizhou. This was a challenge for Linqing as he did not want to leave. However fear of bandits and of disobeying the emperor meant that he had to journey alone. His split loyalties are shown in the paintings and poetry he created en route. After she died Linqing took her remains to Beijing for burial.
