= Yun Shouping =

Chinese calligrapher and painter

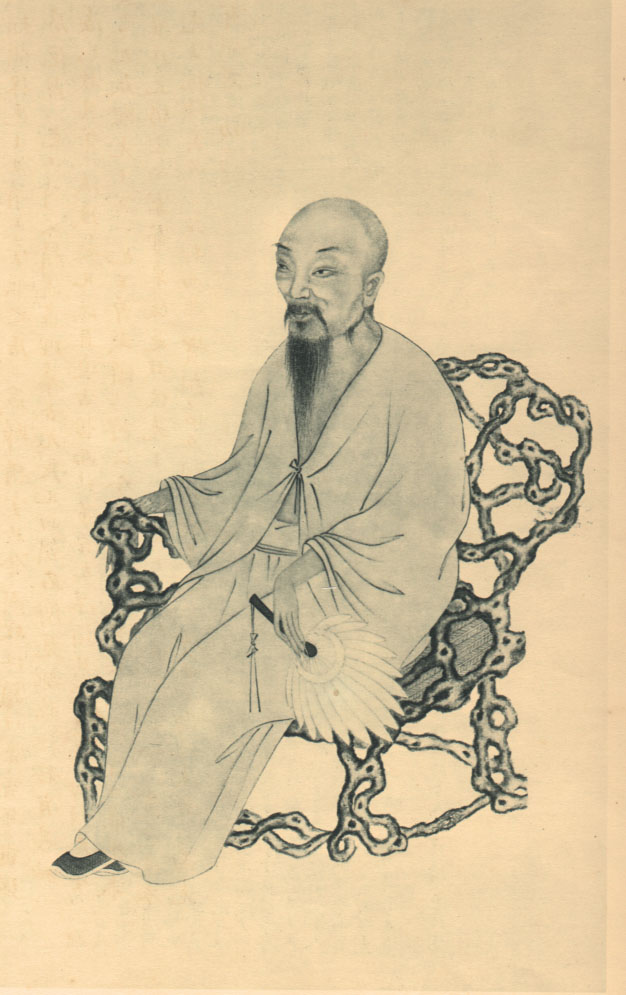
- Born: 1633
- Died: 1690
- Style: mogu
- Movement: Ch'ang-chou school

Yun Shouping (Chinese: 惲壽平; 1633 – 1690), also known as Nantian (Chinese: 南田), was a Chinese calligrapher and painter. He was a major artist of the early Chinese Qing dynasty. Along with the Four Wangs and Wú Lì, he was regarded as one of the "Six Masters" of the Qing period.

== Biography ==
Yun Shouping was born to an impoverished family in Wujin, Jiangsu province. Although he excelled in his classes, his family could not afford for him to attend the civil service examinations. Yun Shouping devoted himself to art. As a child, he composed poetry on lotus blossoms.

== Career ==
As an artist, poet, and calligrapher, Yun Shouping has been said to have mastered the three perfections. He is the founder of the Ch'ang-chou school of painting, and he is credited with reviving the popularity of flower paintings. The mogu bird-and-flower motif experienced a resurgence through Yun Shouping's works and school of art.

Yun Shouping was initially a landscape painter, but he was reportedly so impressed by the works of the artist Wang Hui that he abandoned his training in favor of flower, animal, and insect paintings. Yun Shouping has been mistakenly credited with influencing the works of Jiang Tingxi.

Yun was also recognized as a prominent calligrapher, in which he followed the style of Chu Suiliang.

== Style ==
Yun imitated the 11th-century artist Xu Xi's mogu (or 'boneless') method, an approach that tried to express art without rigidly defined outlines and forms. This style became a hallmark of the Yun family's artistic style, and Yun's daughter Bing continued to develop the technique.

Yun's style was vibrant and expressive; he attempted to display the inner vitality and spirit of his subjects in painting. Yun sought inspiration from the past; his Flower and Fruit imitated the style of the masters of the Yuan dynasty. He used strong colors such as reds and purples, which had traditionally been considered gaudy and offensive by Chinese painters.

== Gallery ==
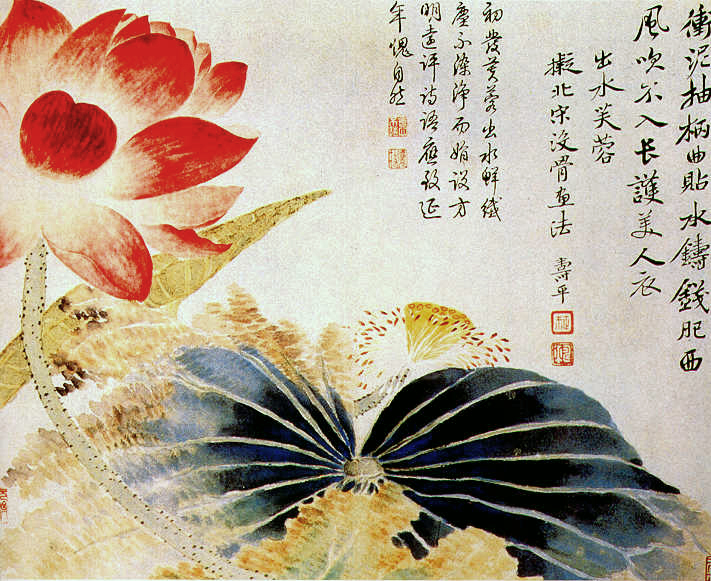
Lotus Flower Breaking the Surface (出水芙蓉圖), Palace Museum, Beijing

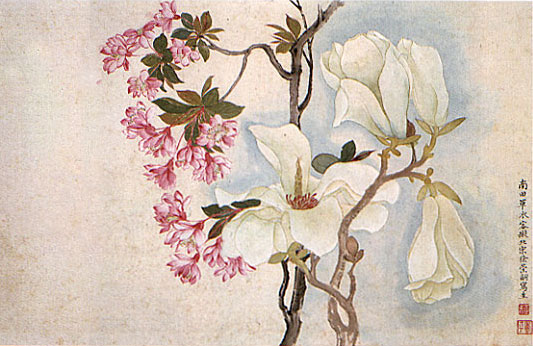
Magnolias

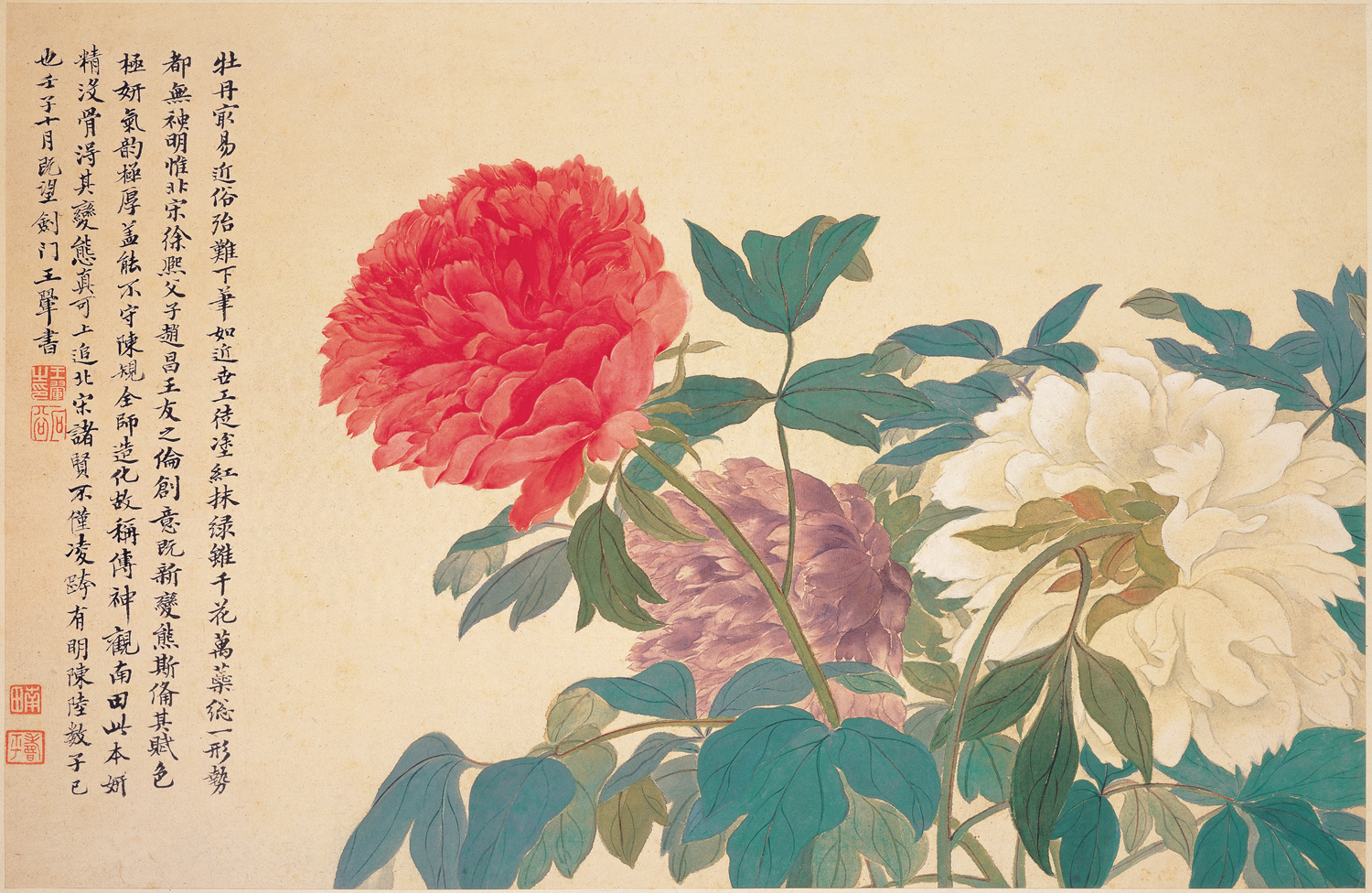
Peonies

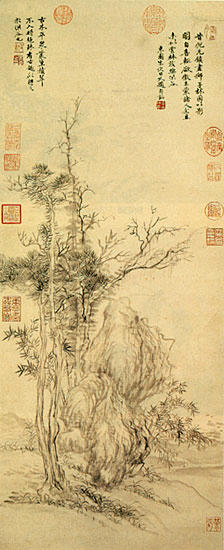
Old Trees and Bamboo

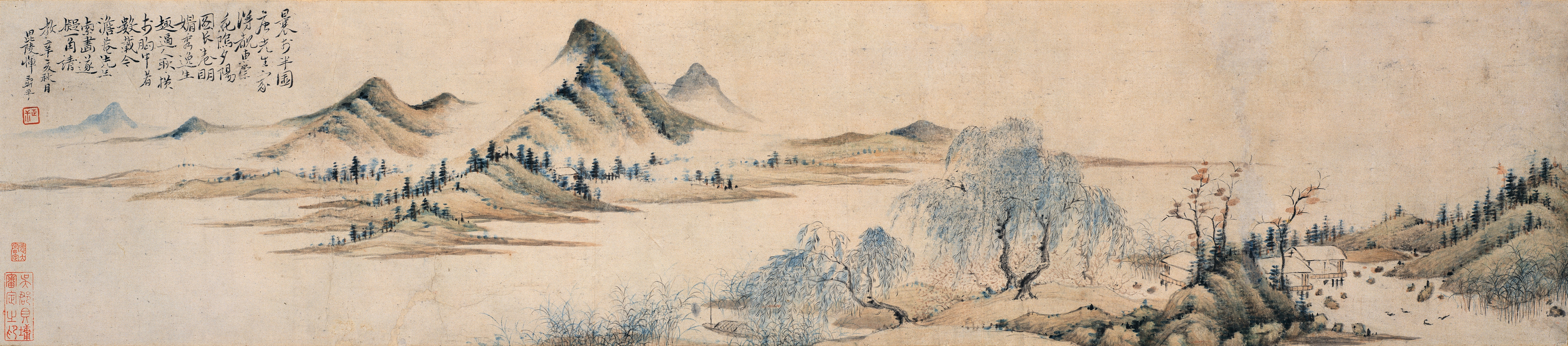
Sunset along Floral Embankment (花隝夕陽圖), Kyoto National Museum

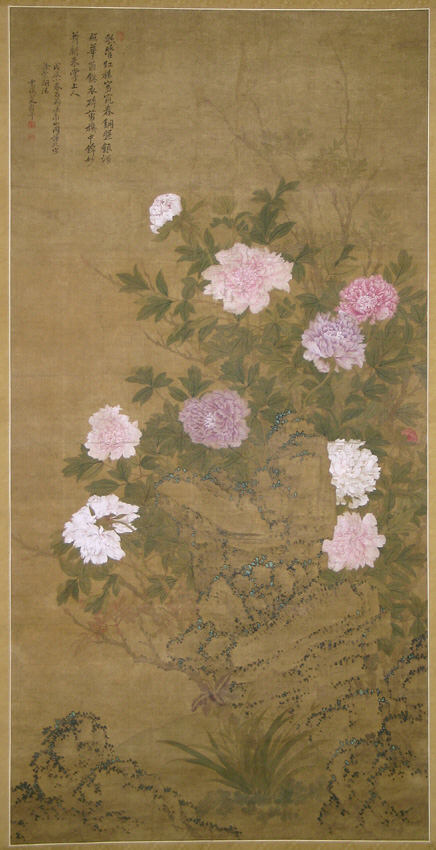
Tree Peonies, Metropolitan Museum of Art

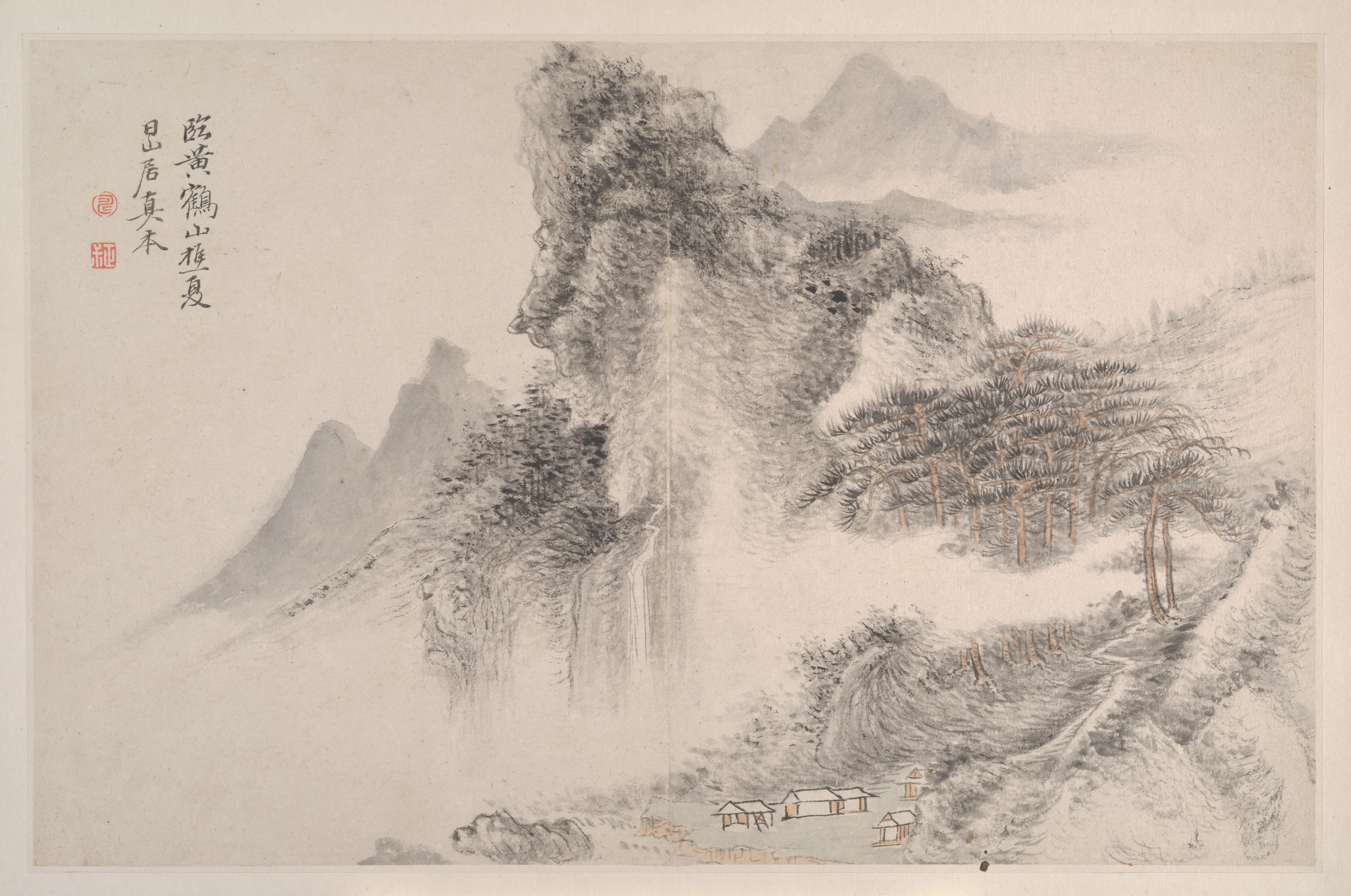
Landscapes in the Manner of Song and Yuan Masters, Metropolitan Museum of Art

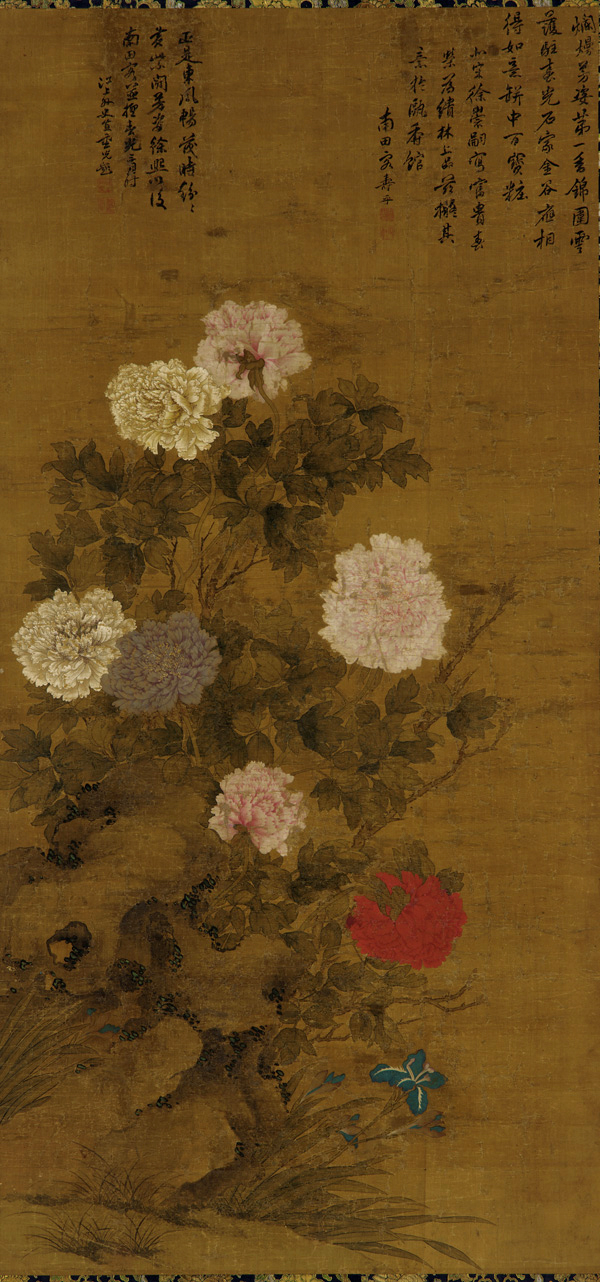
Peonies
