= Kanigawa Station =

Railway station in Kani, Gifu Prefecture, Japan

Kanigawa Station 可児川駅

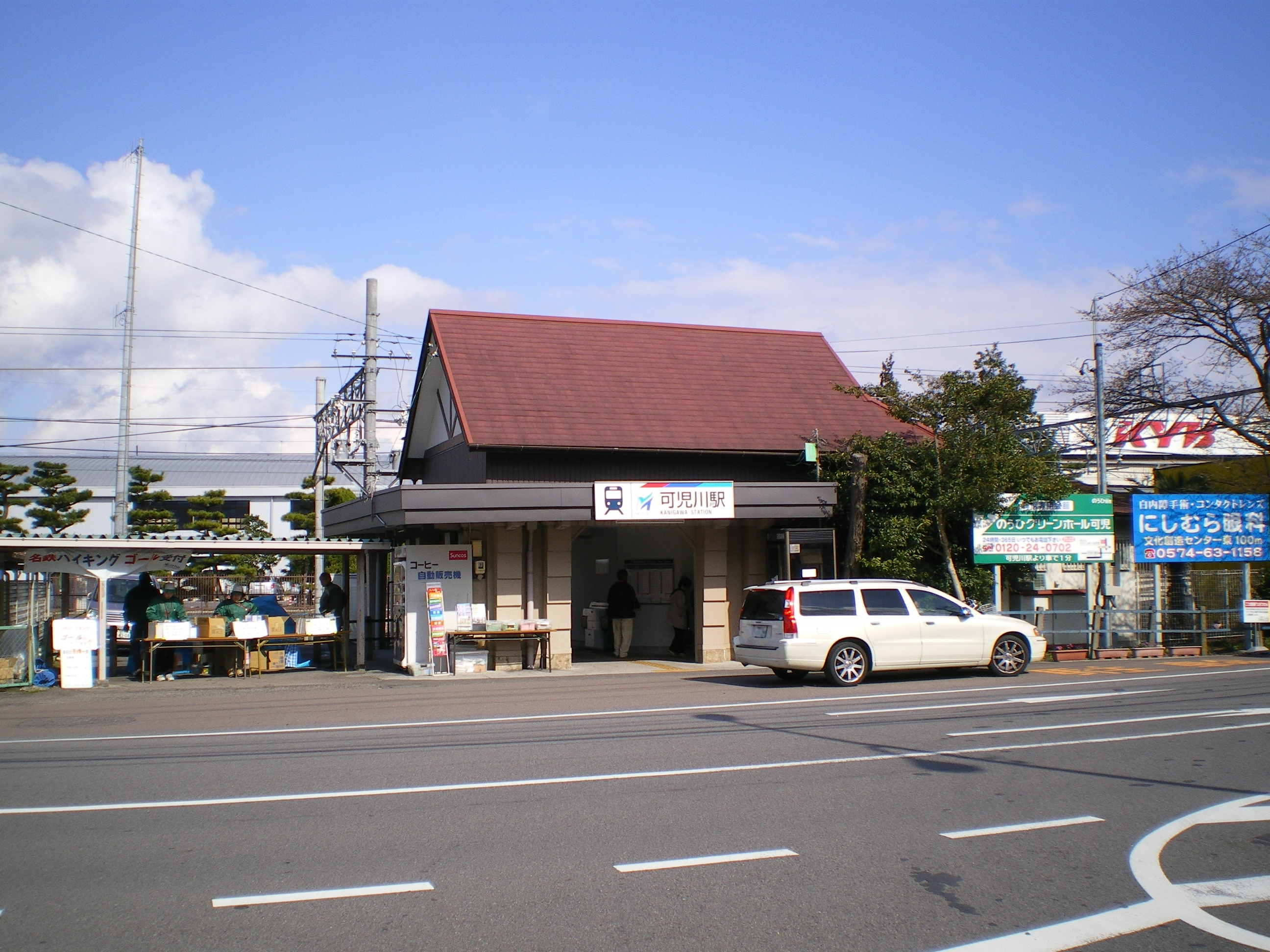
- Kanigawa Station, March 2010

General information
- Location: 1356-7 Dota, Kani-shi, Gifu-ken 509-0206; Japan
- Coordinates: 35.4180°N 137.0187°E
- Operator: Meitetsu
- Line: ■Meitetsu Hiromi Line
- Distance: 9.7 km from Inuyama
- Platforms: 2 side platforms

Other information
- Status: Unstaffed
- Station code: HM04
- Website: Official website (in Japanese)

History
- Opened: April 24, 1925

Passengers
- FY2015: 1520

Services
Preceding station	Meitetsu	Following station
Nishi Kani towards Inuyama	Hiromi Line μSky Limited Express Local	Nihonrain-imawatari towards Shin Kani
Nishi Kani towards Inuyama	Hiromi Line Local (for Mitake)	Nihonrain-imawatari towards Mitake
Location
- Location within Gifu Prefecture Location within Japan

Kanigawa Station (可児川駅, Kanigawa-eki) is a railway station in the city of Kani, Gifu Prefecture, Japan.

== Lines ==
Kanigawa Station is a station on the Hiromi Line, and is located 9.7 kilometers from the terminus of the line at Inuyama.

== Station layout ==
Kanigawa Station has two opposed ground-level side platforms connected by a level crossing. The station is unattended.

=== Platforms ===
1	■ Hiromi Line	for Shin Kani; Change trains at Shin Kani for Mitake
2	■ Hiromi Line	for Inuyama, Nagoya and Central Japan International Airport

== History ==
Kanigawa Station opened on opened on April 24, 1925; 101 years ago, as Rhine Yūen Station (ライン遊園駅). It was renamed Dota Station (土田駅) from November 1, 1943 to December 1, 1949, when it reverted to it former name. It was renamed to its present name on November 10, 1949.

== Surrounding area ==
- Kayaba Industry
- Kani River

== See also ==
- List of railway stations in Japan
