= Aigi Tunnel =

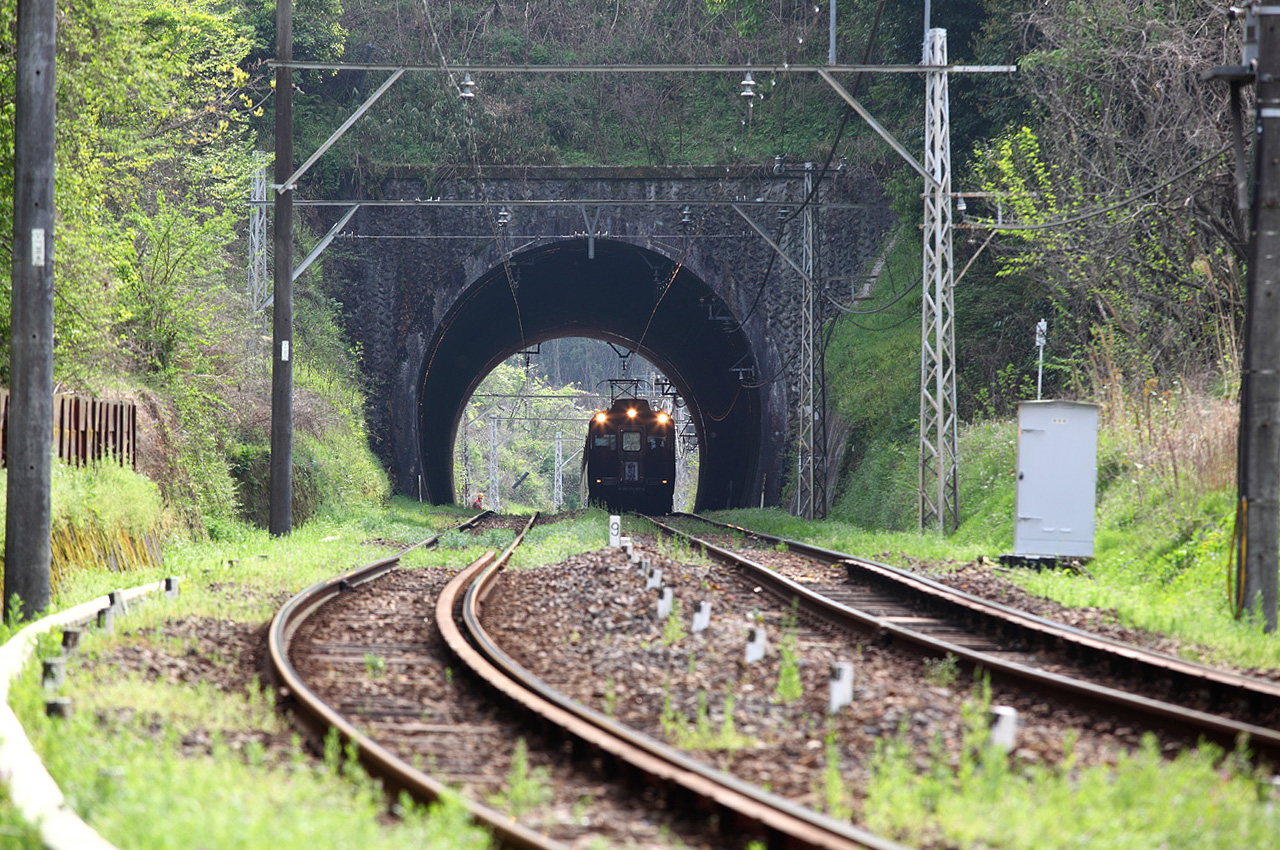
- Aigi Tunnel (From Nishi Kani)
- Interactive map of Aigi Tunnel

Overview
- Official name: 愛岐トンネル
- Line: Meitetsu Hiromi Line
- Location: Kani, Gifu, Japan
- Coordinates: 35°23′25.38″N 136°59′56.68″E

Technical
- Length: 73.28 metres (240.4 ft)

The Aigi Tunnel (愛岐トンネル, Aigi Tonneru) is a 73.28 meters (240.42ft) long railway tunnel located between Zenjino Station and Nishi Kani Station on the Meitetsu Hiromi Line in Japan. The name "Aigi Tunnel" as a portmanteau of "Aichi" and "Gifu" because the tunnel is on the border between Aichi (Ai-) Prefecture and Gifu (-gi) Prefecture. The nearest stations are Zenjino Station in Aichi Prefecture and Nishi Kani Station in Gifu Prefecture.

== History ==
Construction was completed in January 1925. On April 24 of the same year, the former Nagoya Railroad company's Imawatari Line (renamed to Hiromi Line in 1929) from Inuyama Station to Imawatari Station (renamed to Nihon Rhine Imawatari Station in 1969) opened, together with the tunnel. When it was opened it could support two tracks, but at the time only had one. Another track was added in 1969.
