= Zenjino Station =

Railway station in Inuyama, Aichi Prefecture, Japan

Zenjino Station 善師野駅

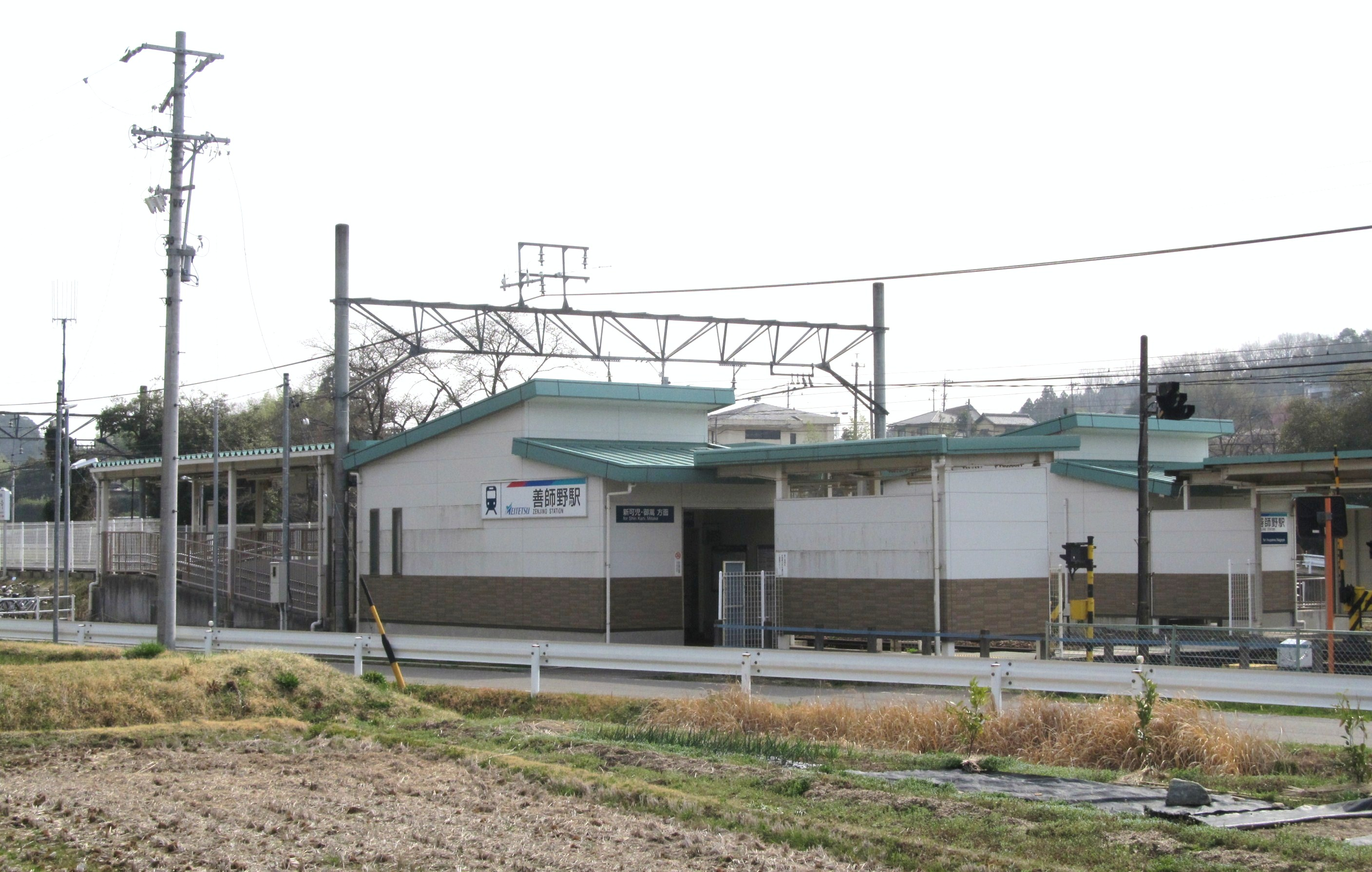
- Zenjino Station

General information
- Location: Fushiyamiyashita Zenjino, Inuyama-shi, Aichi-ken 484-0003; Japan
- Coordinates: 35°23′23.29″N 136°58′47.54″E
- Operator: Meitetsu
- Line: ■ Meitetsu Hiromi Line
- Distance: 4.0 kilometers from Inuyama
- Platforms: 2 side platforms

Other information
- Status: Unstaffed
- Station code: HM02
- Website: Official website

History
- Opened: 24 April 1925

Passengers
- FY2015: 1263

Services
Preceding station	Meitetsu	Following station
Tomioka-mae towards Inuyama	Hiromi Line Local	Nishi Kani towards Mitake
Location
- Location within Aichi Prefecture Location within Japan

Zenjino Station (善師野駅, Zenjino-eki) is a railway station in the city of Inuyama, Aichi Prefecture, Japan, operated by Meitetsu.

== Lines ==
Zenjino Station is served by the Meitetsu Hiromi Line, and is located 4.0 kilometers from the starting point of the line at Inuyama.

== Station layout ==
The station has two opposed side platforms connected by a level crossing. The station has automated ticket machines, Manaca automated turnstiles and is unattended.

=== Platforms ===
1	■ Hiromi Line	For Shin Kani
2	■ Hiromi Line	For Inuyama and Meitetsu Nagoya

== Station history ==
Zenjino Station was opened on 24 April 1925.

== Passenger statistics ==
In fiscal 2015, the station was used by an average of 1263 passengers daily.

== Surrounding area ==
- Aigi Tunnel

== See also ==
- List of railway stations in Japan
