= Tomioka-mae Station =

Railway station in Inuyama, Aichi Prefecture, Japan

Tomioka-mae Station 富岡前駅

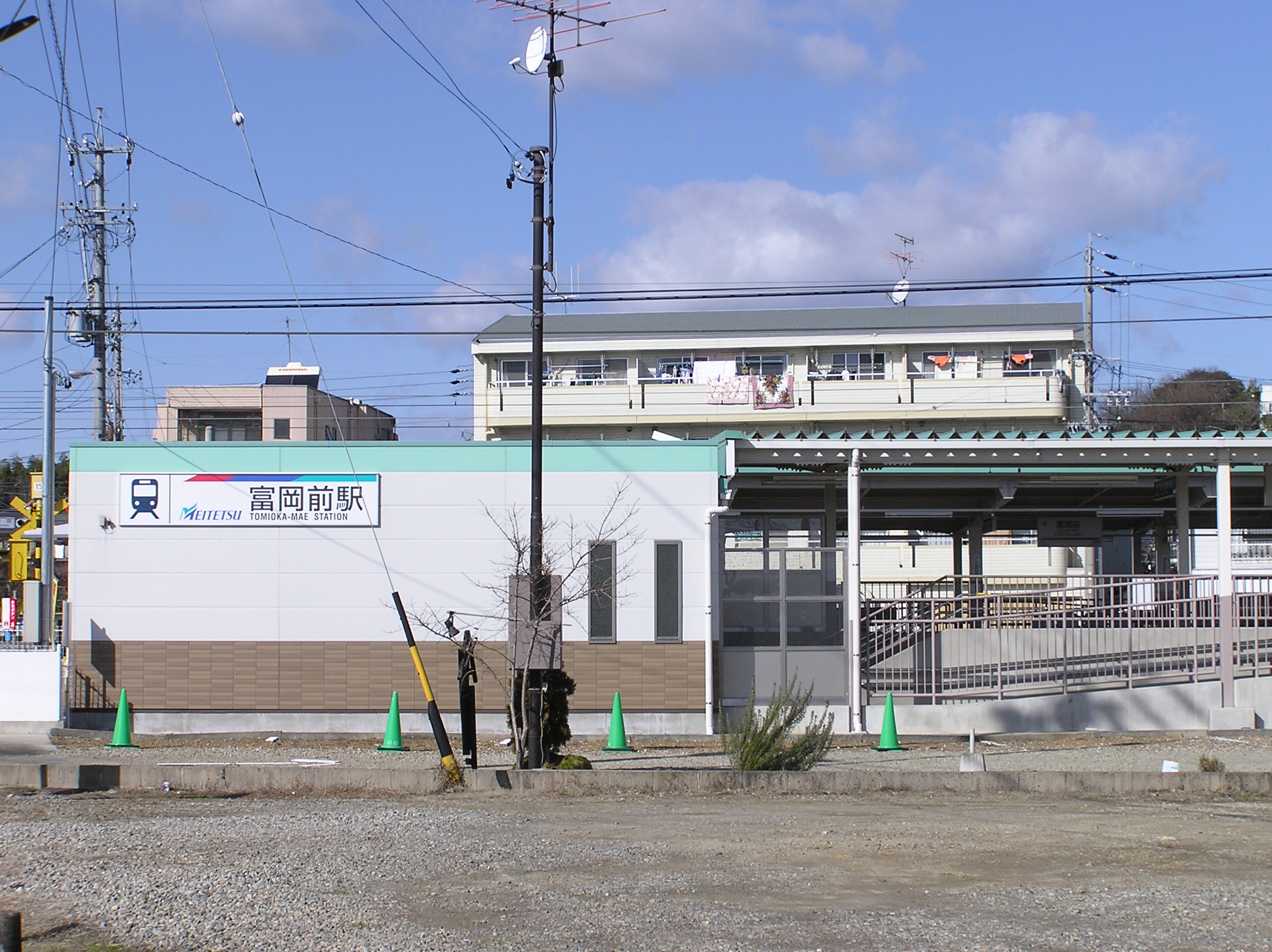
- Tomioka-mae Station in February 2010

General information
- Location: Kabuike-127 Tomioka Inuyama-shi, Aichi-ken 484-0092; Japan
- Coordinates: 35.3796°N 136.9619°E
- Operator: Meitetsu
- Line: ■ Meitetsu Hiromi Line
- Distance: 1.9 kilometers from Inuyama
- Platforms: 1 side platform

Other information
- Status: Unstaffed
- Station code: HM01
- Website: Official website

History
- Opened: 24 April 1925

Passengers
- FY2015: 886

Services
Preceding station	Meitetsu	Following station
Inuyama Terminus	Hiromi Line Local	Zenjino towards Mitake
Location
- Location within Aichi Prefecture Location within Japan

Tomioka-mae Station (富岡前駅, Tomioka-mae-eki) is a railway station in the city of Inuyama, Aichi Prefecture, Japan, operated by Meitetsu.

== Lines ==
Tomioka-mae Station is served by the Meitetsu Hiromi Line, and is located 1.9 kilometers from the starting point of the line at Inuyama.

== Station layout ==
The station has two opposed side platforms connected by a level crossing. The station has automated ticket machines, Manaca automated turnstiles and is unattended.

=== Platforms ===
1	■ Hiromi Line	For Shin Kani
2	■ Hiromi Line	For Inuyama and Meitetsu Nagoya

== Station history ==
Tomioka-mae Station was opened on 24 April 1925.

== Passenger statistics ==
In fiscal 2015, the station was used by an average of 886 passengers daily.

== Surrounding area ==
- Primate Research Institute

== See also ==
- List of railway stations in Japan
