= Gōdo Station (Gifu) =

Railway station in Mitake, Gifu Prefecture, Japan

Gōdo Station 顔戸駅

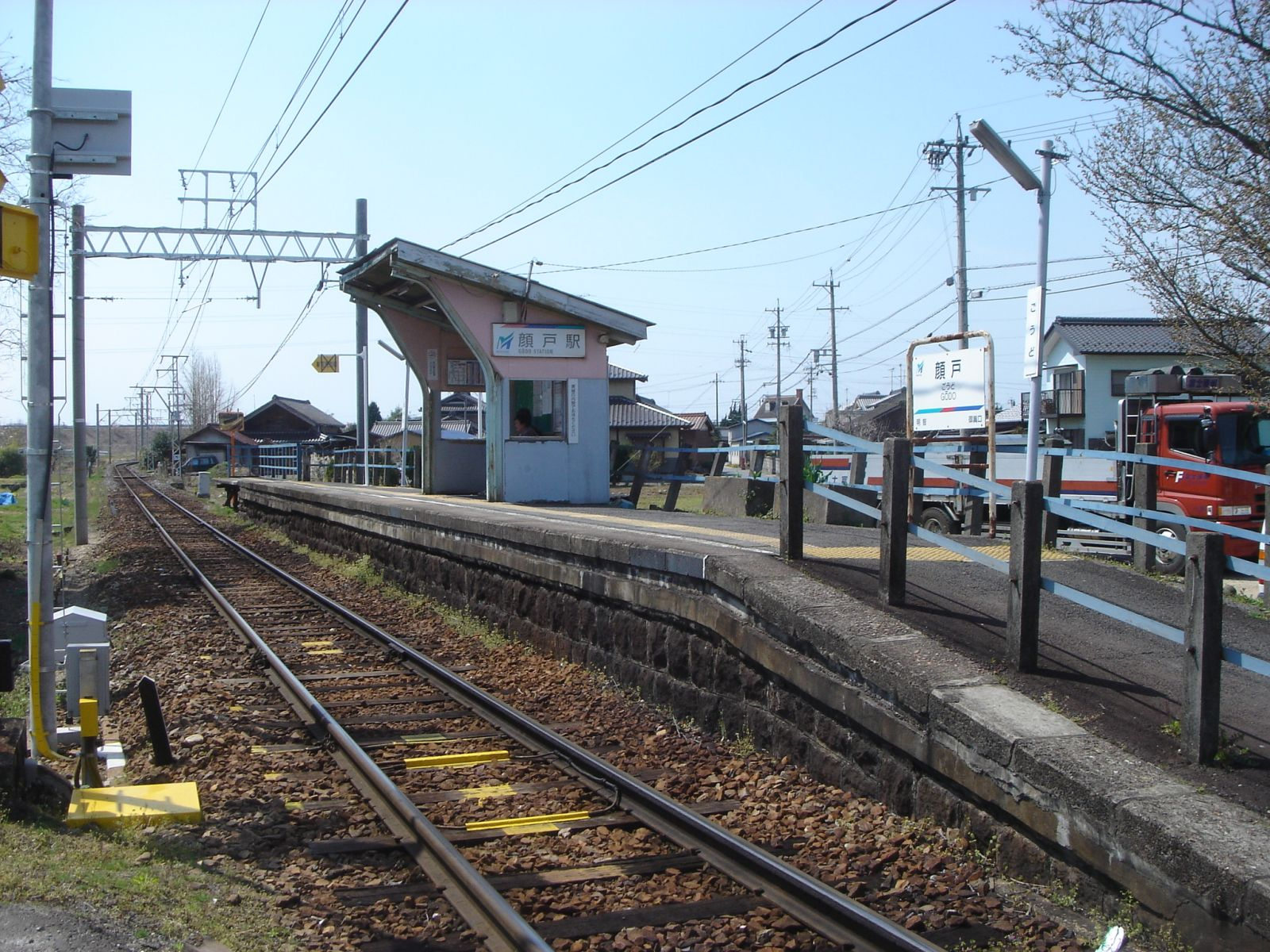
- Gōdo Station, April 2008

General information
- Location: Gōdo , Mitake-chō, Kani District, Gifu Prefecture 505-0122; Japan
- Coordinates: 35.4347°N 137.1050°E
- Operator: Meitetsu
- Line: ■Meitetsu Hiromi Line
- Distance: 20.0 km from Inuyama
- Platforms: 1 side platform

Other information
- Status: Unstaffed
- Station code: HM08
- Website: Official website (in Japanese)

History
- Opened: October 1, 1928

Passengers
- FY2013: 184

Services
Preceding station	Meitetsu	Following station
Akechi towards Inuyama	Hiromi Line Local	Mitakeguchi towards Mitake
Location
- Location within Gifu Prefecture Location within Japan

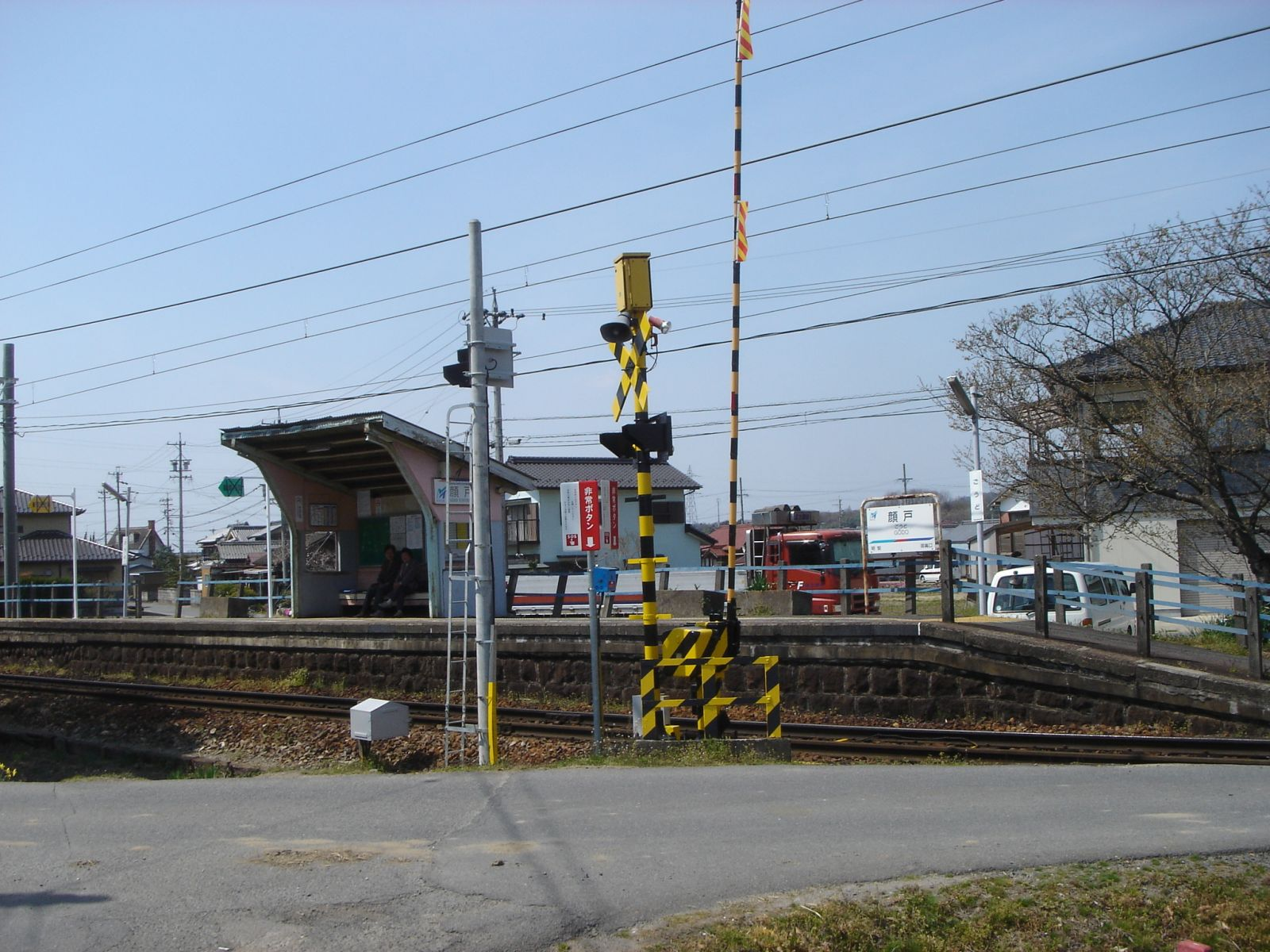
Gōdo Station

Gōdo Station (顔戸駅, Gōdo-eki) is a railway station located in the town of Mitake, Gifu Prefecture, Japan, operated by the private railway operator Meitetsu.

== Lines ==
Gōdo Station is a station on the Hiromi Line, and is located 20.0 kilometers from the terminus of the line at Inuyama.

== Station layout ==
Gōdo Station has one ground-level side platform serving a single bi-directional track. There is no station building. The station is unattended.

== History ==
Gōdo Station opened on October 1, 1928.

== Surrounding area ==
The station is located in a residential area.

== See also ==
- List of railway stations in Japan
