= Kotsuyōsui Station =

Railway station in Fusō, Aichi Prefecture, Japan

Kotsuyōsui Station 木津用水駅

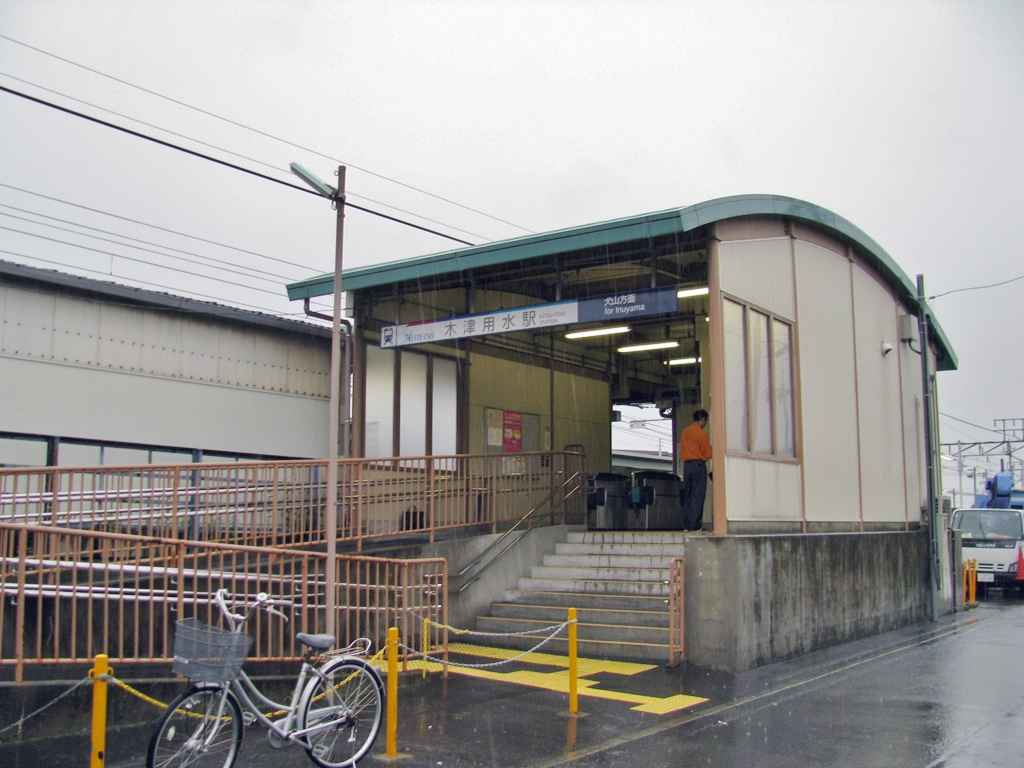
- Kotsuyōsui Station building, April 2009

General information
- Location: 266 Komenoyama Takao, Fusō-machi, Niwa-gun, Aichi-ken 480-0102; Japan
- Coordinates: 35.3671°N 136.9258°E
- Operator: Meitetsu
- Line: ■ Meitetsu Inuyama Line
- Distance: 22.6 kilometers from Biwajima
- Platforms: 2 side platforms

Other information
- Status: Unstaffed
- Station code: IY13
- Website: Official website

History
- Opened: August 6, 1912

Passengers
- FY2013: 2009

Services
| Preceding station | Meitetsu | Following station |
|---|---|---|
| Fusō towards Shimo Otai | Inuyama Line Semi-Express Local | Inuyamaguchi towards Shin-Unuma |
Location
- Location within Aichi Prefecture Location within Japan

Kotsuyōsui Station (木津用水駅, Kotsuyōsui-eki) is a railway station in the town of Fusō, Aichi Prefecture, Japan, operated by Meitetsu.

== Lines ==
Kotsuyōsui Station is served by the Meitetsu Inuyama Line, and is located 22.6 kilometers from the starting point of the line at Biwajima.

== Station layout ==
The station has two opposed side platforms connected by an underpass. The platforms are of uneven length. The platform for Nagoya-bound trains is longer, and can handle trains of up to eight carriages in length, whereas the platform for Inuyama-bound trains is shorter, and can handle trains of only up to six carriages in length. The station is unattended.

=== Platforms ===
| 1 | ■ Inuyama Line | For Inuyama and Shin Kani |
| 2 | ■ Inuyama Line | For Kōnan, Iwakura, Meitetsu-Nagoya, and the Tsurumai Line |

== Station history ==
Kotsuyōsui Station was opened on August 6, 1912. The station was closed in 1944, and reopened on November 18, 1952. It has been unattended since June 1974. A new station building was completed in January 2004.

== Surrounding area ==
- Toyobo Inuyama factory

== See also ==
- List of railway stations in Japan
