= Kobuchi Dam =

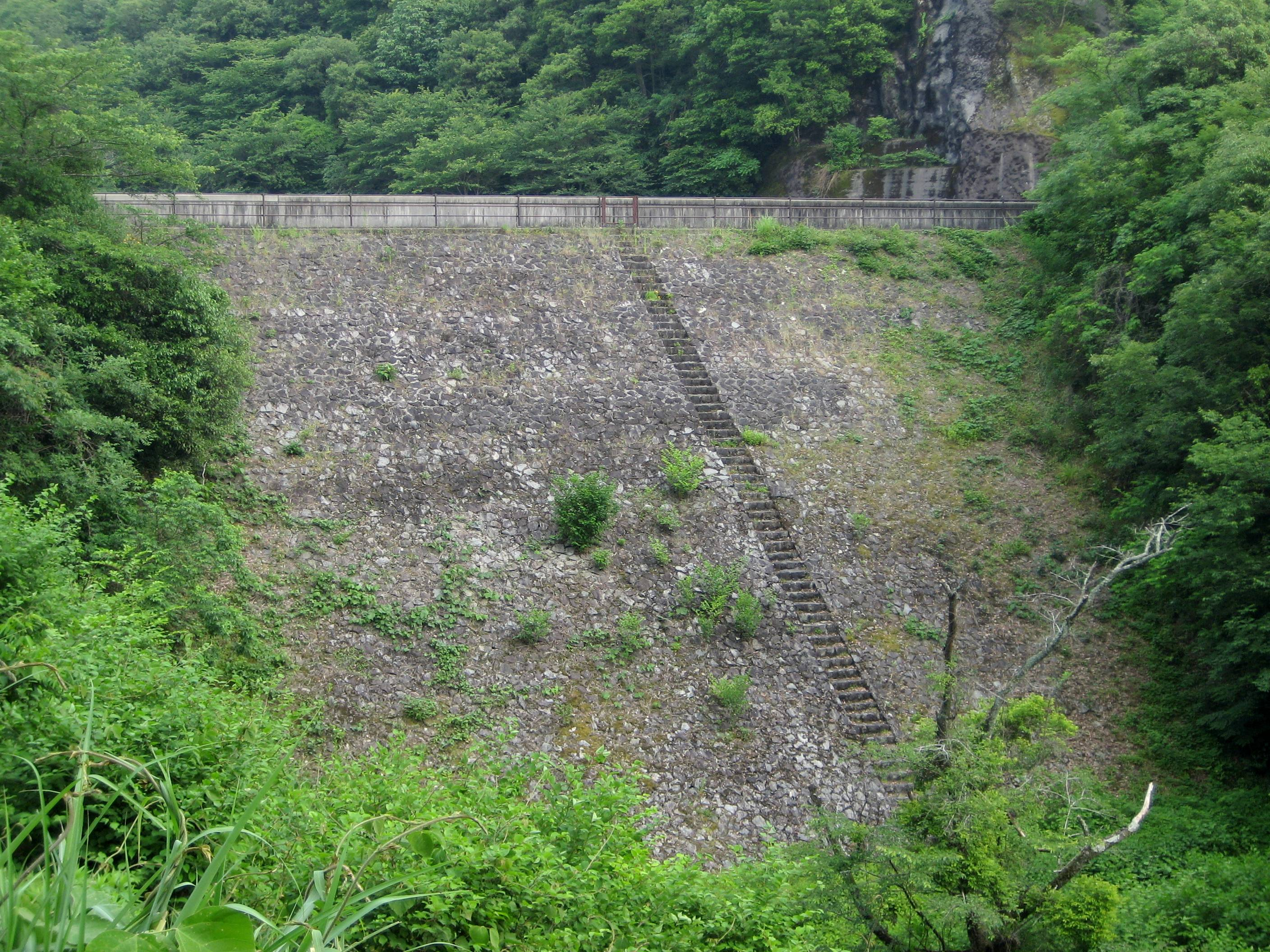
- Interactive map of Kobuchi Dam
- Location: Gifu Prefecture, Japan
- Coordinates: 35°24′02″N 137°07′08″E
- Construction began: 1946
- Opening date: 1951

Dam and spillways
- Impounds: Kukuri River
- Height: 18.4 m
- Length: 53.0 m

Reservoir
- Total capacity: 552,000 m^{3}
- Catchment area: 7.5 km^{2}
- Surface area: 9 hectares

Kobuchi Dam (小渕ダム, Kobuchi damu) is a dam in Kani, Gifu, Japan. It dams the Kukuri River in the Kiso River network. It is 18.4 metres (60 ft) tall, is Japan's first rock-fill embankment dam, and is intended to prevent damage to farmland from flooding. It is also known as the Kobuchi Reservoir, Kobuchi Disaster Prevention Reservoir, and Kani River Disaster Prevention Kobuchi Dam.

== Summary ==
In 1951, the Kobuchi Dam became the first rock-fill dam built in Japan. A rock-fill dam is a dam built up of stone, so the dam must have an impermeable wall, and there are various types of dams classified depending on the type of wall. In the case of Kobuchi Dam, the upstream side is covered with a concrete cement surface making it a concrete-face rock-fill dam.

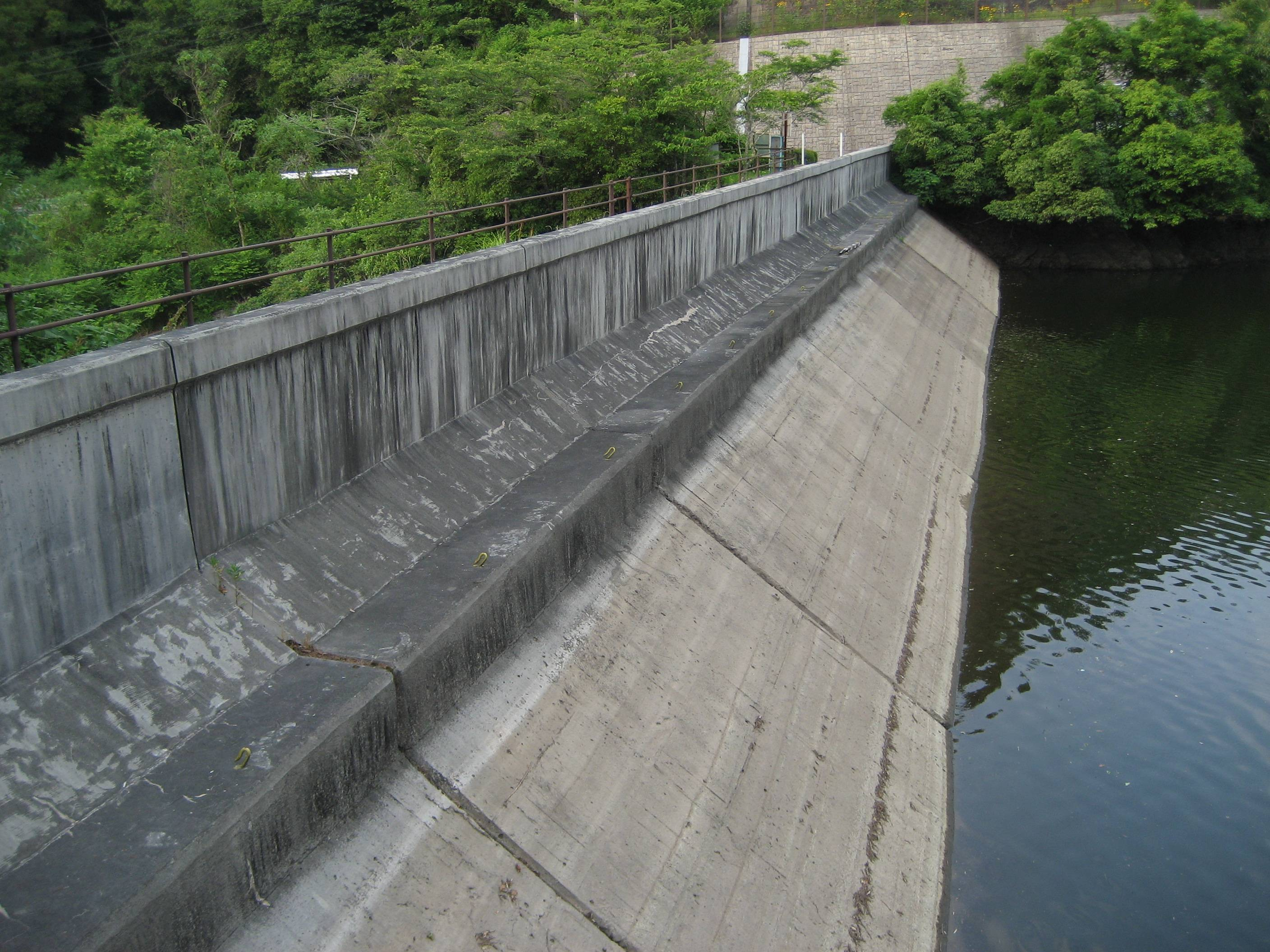
Kobuchi Dam's cement face

Most rock-fill dams with an upstream-facing impermeable wall subsequently tended to use asphalt in the wall, so among the many dams in Japan, there are only four dams with concrete walls, Kobuchi Dam, Ishibuchi Dam, Minase Dam, and Nozori Dam.

In particular, Ishibuchi Dam in Iwate Prefecture's Iwasa River was built at the same time as Kobuchi Dam. That dam was finished in the same year, 1953, but construction of Kobuchi Dam began in 1945, earlier than Ishibuchi Dam, and from this fact Kobuchi Dam holds the honor of being Japan's first rock-fill dam. Currently, Isawa Dam is under construction downstream of Ishibuchi Dam, and Ishibuchi dam will be submerged when Iwasa Dam is finished in 2013.

== Sightseeing ==
=== Transportation ===
From Kani Station on the Taita Line, there is a bus on Tohtetsu's Kukuri Line which stops at a bus stop named Kobuchi Dam, which is right next to the dam itself.

=== Vicinity of the Reservoir ===
A park was created in vicinity of the reservoir which is known for its cherry blossoms in spring and fall colors in autumn. The Tōkai Nature Trail extends through the area. The Kobuchi Bridge is a walkway spanning the reservoir, and in the past a melody was played automatically when one crossed the bridge, so it is also called the "melody bridge." There are also other recreation areas, as well as parking lots and so on.

One is allowed to fish in the reservoir, but it is necessary to pay a 500 yen fee to the Kani Fishing Cooperative.

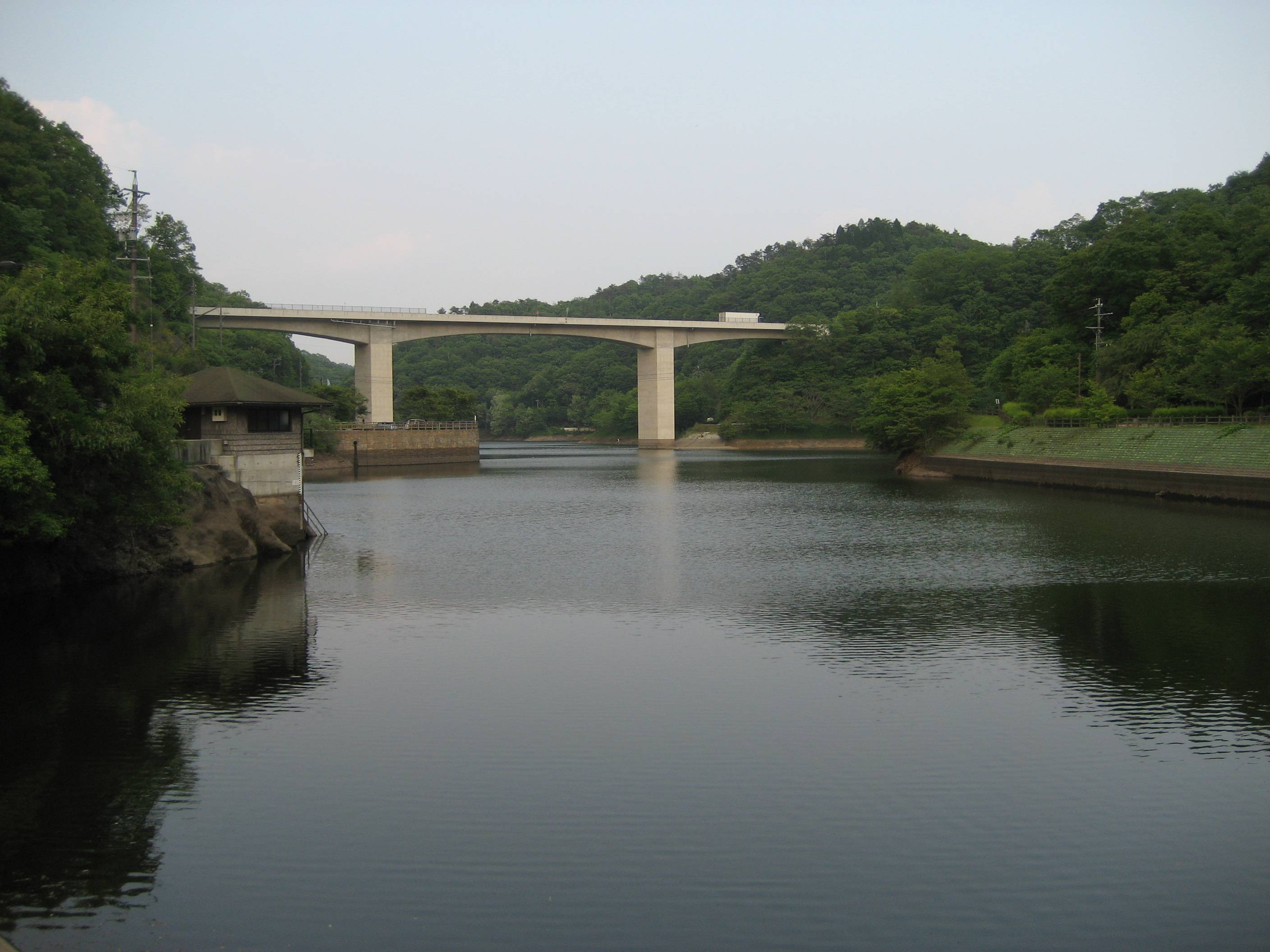
The Tōkai-Kanjō Expressway crosses the reservoir

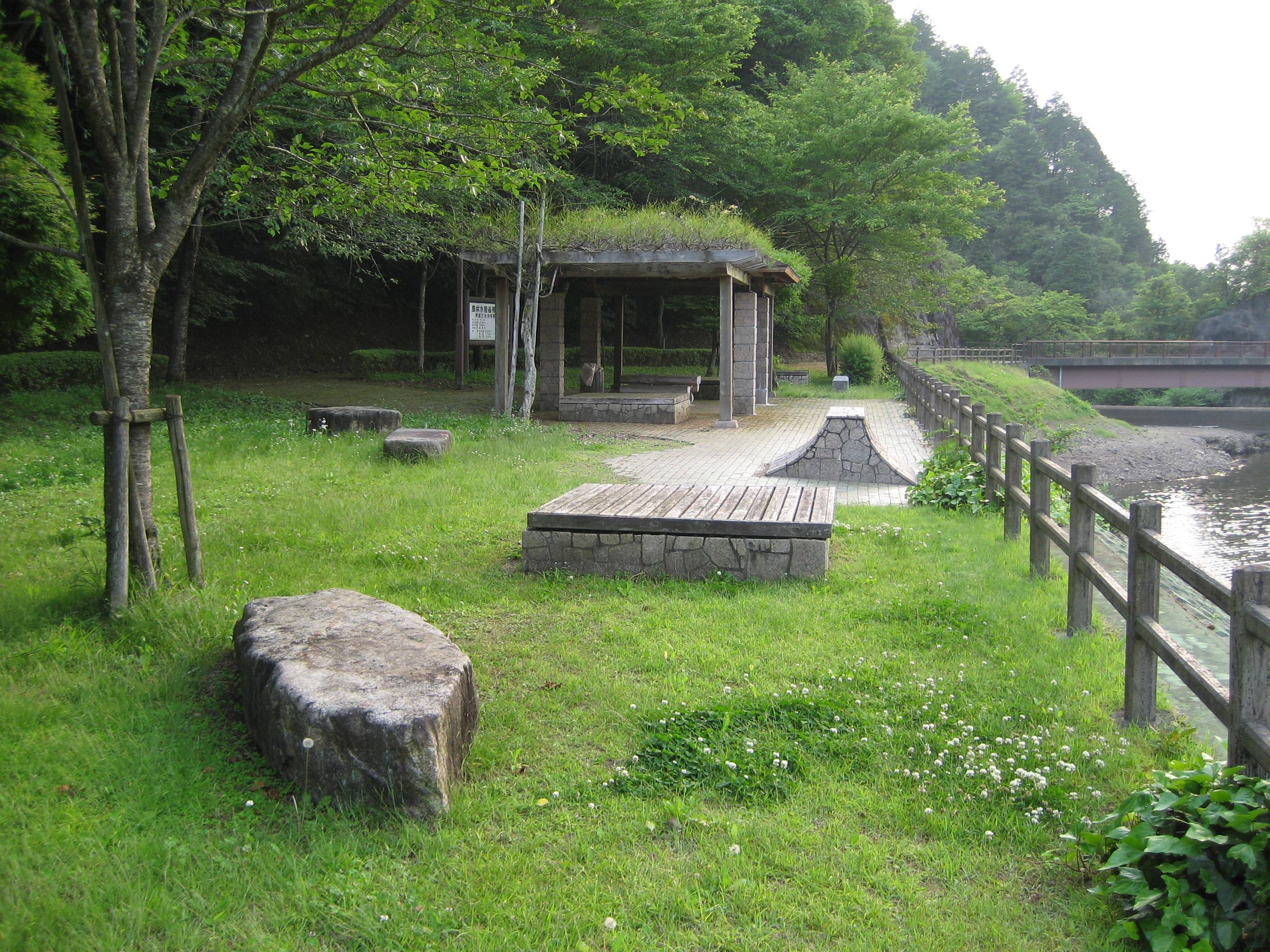
Kobuchi Dam Park

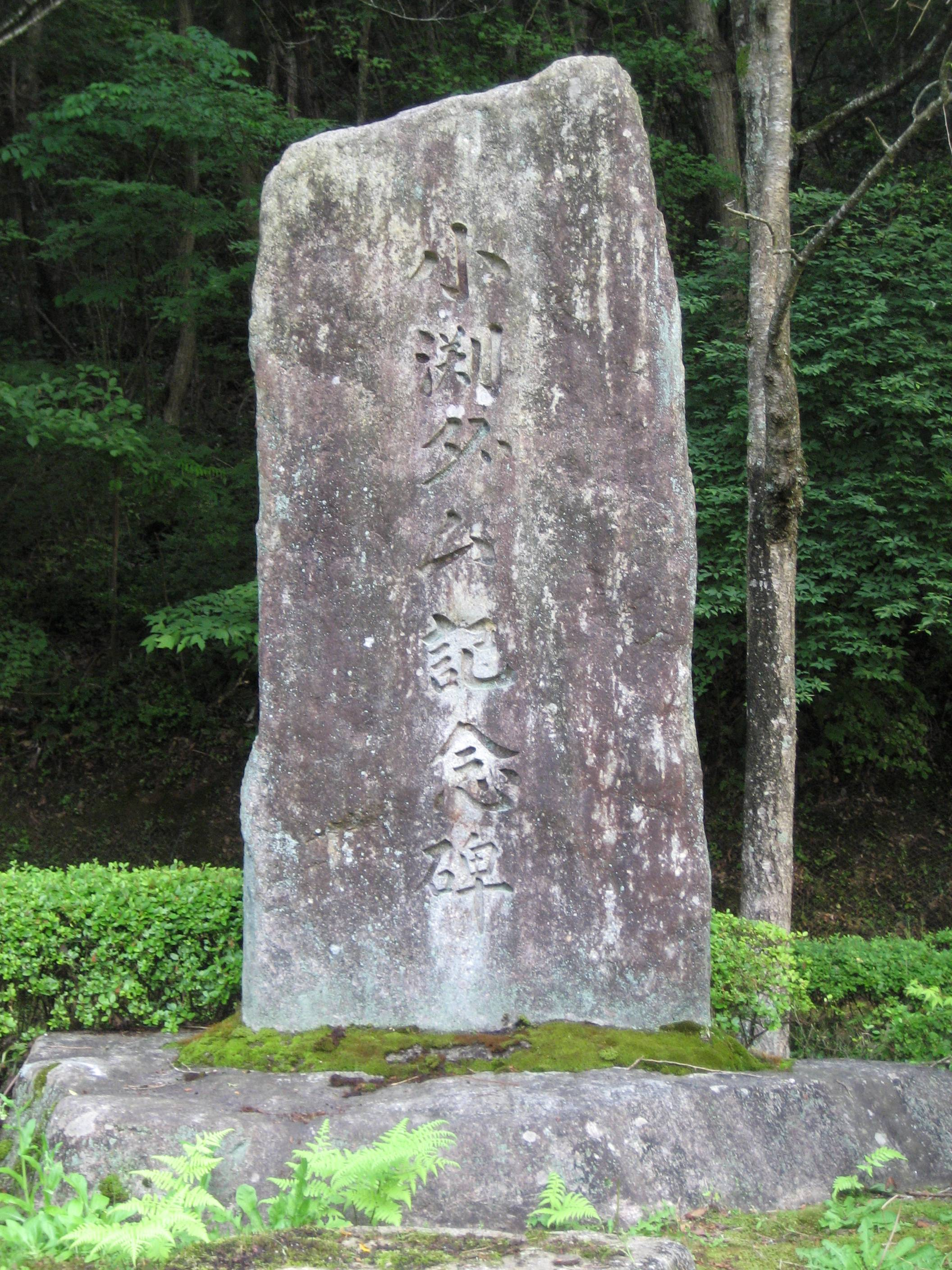
Kobuchi Dam monument
