= Nishi Kani Station =

Railway station in Kani, Gifu Prefecture, Japan

Nishi Kani Station 西可児駅

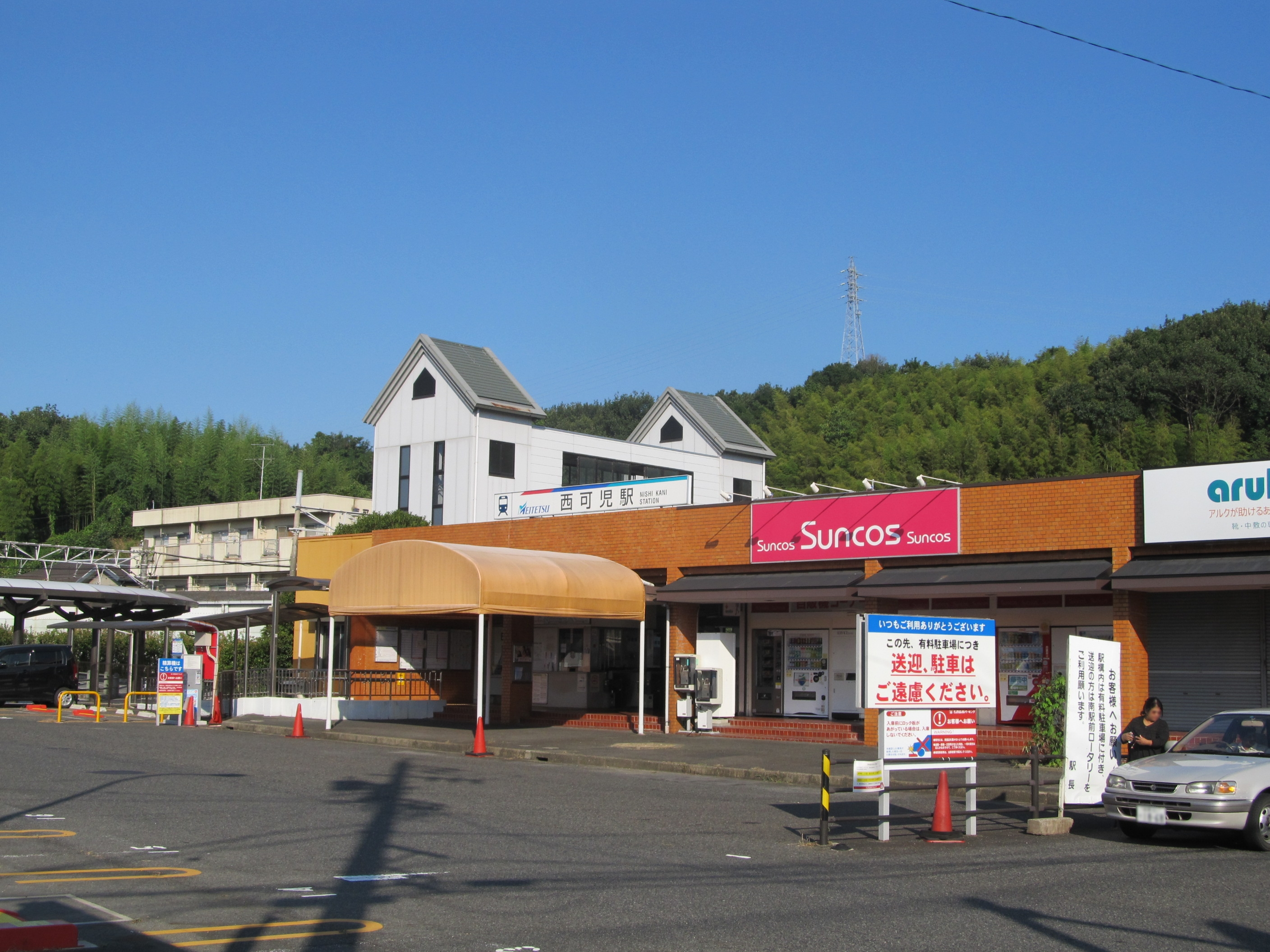
- Nishi Kani Station in August 2008

General information
- Location: Higashikatabira 2-26, Kani-shi, Gifu-ken 509-0266 （可児市帷子新町二丁目26番地） Japan
- Coordinates: 35.4045°N 137.0108°E
- Operator: Meitetsu
- Line: ■Meitetsu Hiromi Line
- Distance: 7.7 km from Inuyama
- Platforms: 2 side platforms
- Connections: Bus stop

Other information
- Status: Staffed
- Station code: HM03
- Website: Official website (in Japanese)

History
- Opened: April 24, 1925

Passengers
- 2015: 4,890 daily

Services
Preceding station	Meitetsu	Following station
Inuyama Terminus	Hiromi Line μSky Limited Express	Kanigawa towards Shin Kani
Zenjino towards Inuyama	Hiromi Line Local	Kanigawa towards Mitake
Location
- Location within Gifu Prefecture Location within Japan

Nishi Kani Station (西可児駅, Nishi Kani-eki) is a railway station in the city of Kani, Gifu Prefecture, Japan.

== Lines ==
Nishi Kani Station is a station on the Hiromi Line, and is located 7.7 kilometers from the terminus of the line at Inuyama.

== Station layout ==
Nishi Kani Station has two ground-level side platforms connected by a footbridge. The station is staffed.

=== Platforms ===
1	■ Hiromi Line	for Shin Kani; Change trains at Shin Kani for Mitake
2	■ Hiromi Line	for Inuyama, Nagoya and Central Japan International Airport

== History ==
Nishi Kani Station opened on April 24, 1925; 101 years ago.

== Surrounding area ==
- Aigi Tunnel
- Meijo University, Kani campus

== See also ==
- List of railway stations in Japan
