= Nihonrain-imawatari Station =

Railway station in Kani, Gifu Prefecture, Japan

Nihonrain-imawatari Station 日本ライン今渡駅

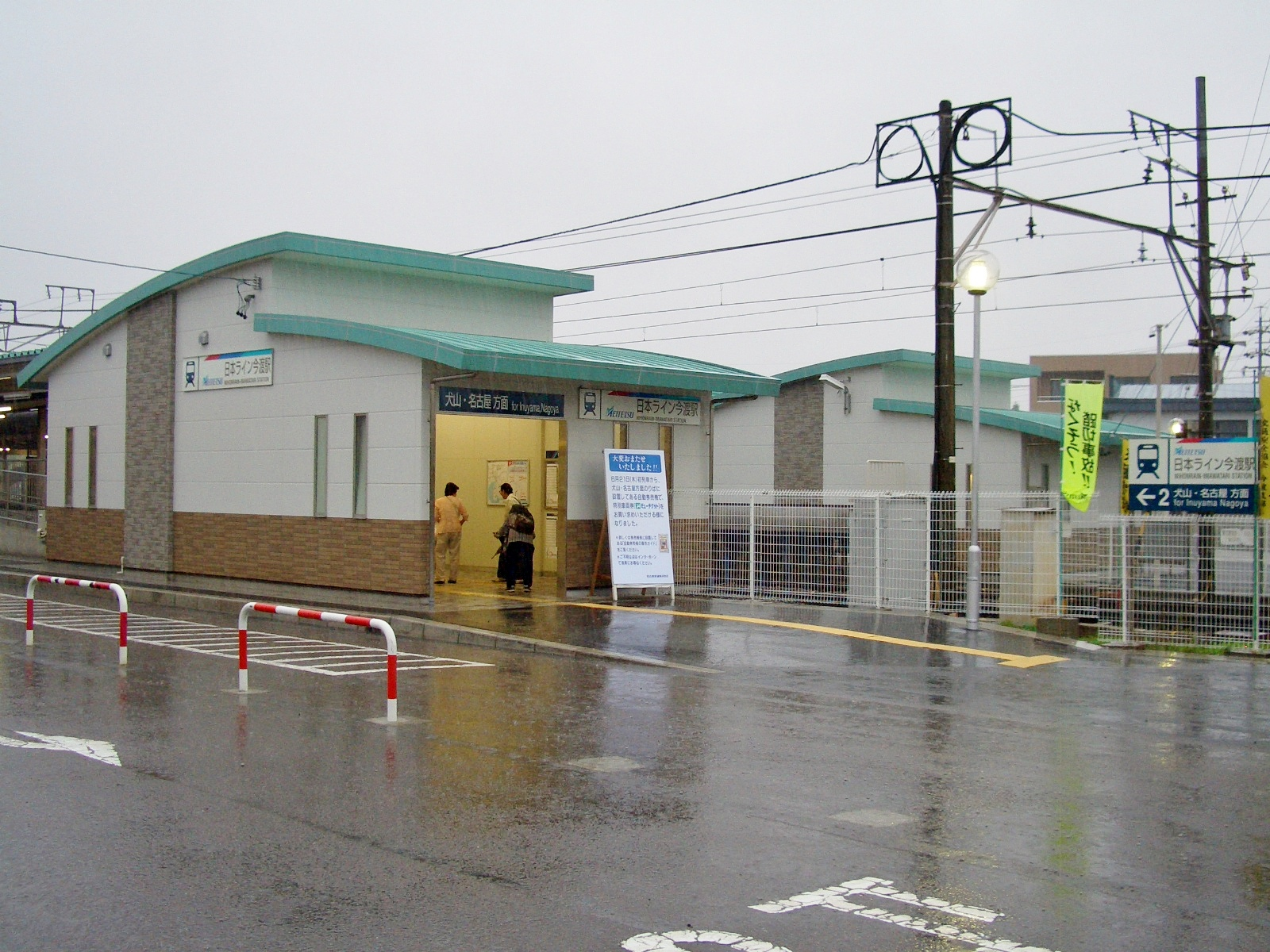
- Nihonrain-imawatari Station in June 2007

General information
- Location: 406-2 Imawatari, Kani-shi, Gifu-ken 509-0207; Japan
- Coordinates: 35.4325°N 137.0370°E
- Operator: Meitetsu
- Line: ■ Meitetsu Hiromi Line
- Distance: 12.2 km from Inuyama
- Platforms: 2 side platforms
- Connections: Bus stop

Other information
- Status: Unstaffed
- Station code: HM05
- Website: Official website

History
- Opened: April 4, 1925
- Former names: Imawatari (until 1969)

Passengers
- FY2015: 1,626 daily

Services
Preceding station	Meitetsu	Following station
Kanigawa towards Inuyama	Hiromi Line μSky Limited Express Local	Shin Kani Terminus
Kanigawa towards Inuyama	Hiromi Line Local (for Mitake)	Shin Kani towards Mitake
Location
- Location within Gifu Prefecture Location within Japan

Nihonrain-imawatari Station (日本ライン今渡駅, Nihonrain-imawatari-eki) is a railway station on the Meitetsu Hiromi Line in the city of Kani, Gifu, Japan, operated by the private railway operator Meitetsu. Its name refers to the nearby Japan Rhine valley.

== Lines ==
Nihonrain-imawatari Station is served by the 22.3 km Meitetsu Hiromi Line from Inuyama in Aichi Prefecture to Mitake in Gifu Prefecture. It is 12.2 kilometers from the starting point of the line at Inuyama.

== Station layout ==
The station has two opposed ground-level side platforms, connected by a level crossing. The station is unattended.

=== Platforms ===
1	■ Meitetsu Hiromi Line	for Shin Kani and Mitake
2	■ Meitetsu Hiromi Line	for Inuyama, Nagoya, and Central Japan International Airport

== History ==
The station opened on April 4, 1925 as Imawatari Station (今渡駅). It was renamed Nihonrain-imawatari Station on November 10, 1969.
