= Kukuri River =

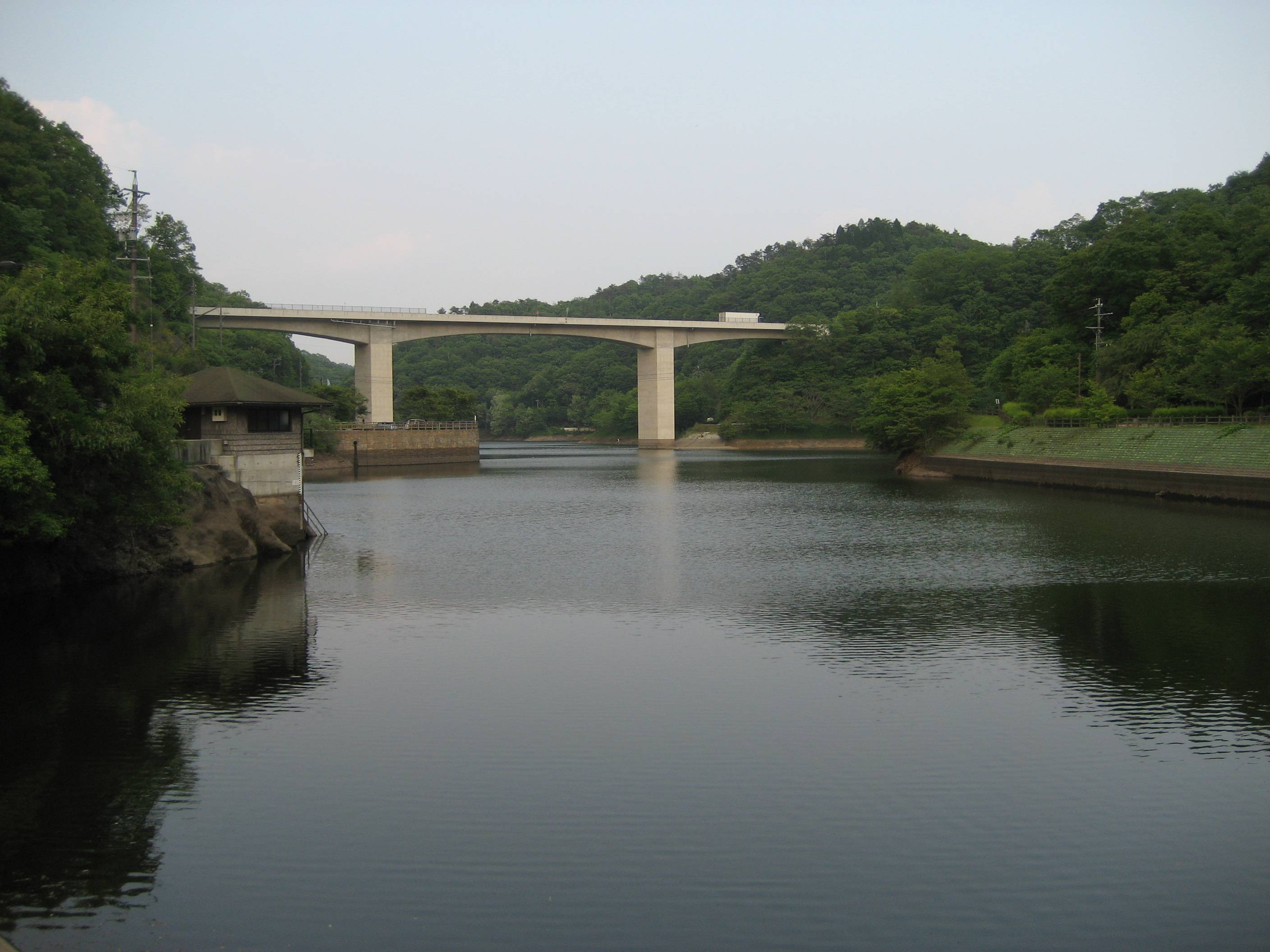
- Lake at Kobuchi Dam on the Kukuri River
- Native name: 久々利川 (Japanese)

Location
- Country: Japan

Physical characteristics
- Source
  - location: Kani
- Mouth: Kani River
  - coordinates: 35°24′46″N 137°03′15″E

Basin features
- River system: Kiso River

The Kukuri River (久々利川, Kukuri-gawa) is a river which flows through the city of Kani in Gifu Prefecture, Japan. It is part of the Kiso River system.

== Geography ==
The river originates in the Kukuri neighborhood in eastern Kani. It flows westward to the Kani River.

On the upper part of the river is the Kobuchi Dam, which was the first rock-filled dam built in Japan.
