= Akechi Station =

Akechi Station (明智駅) is the name of two train stations located in Gifu Prefecture, Japan:

- Akechi Station (Ena)
- Akechi Station (Kani)
