= Akechi Station (Kani) =

Railway station in Kani, Gifu Prefecture, Japan

Akechi Station 明智駅

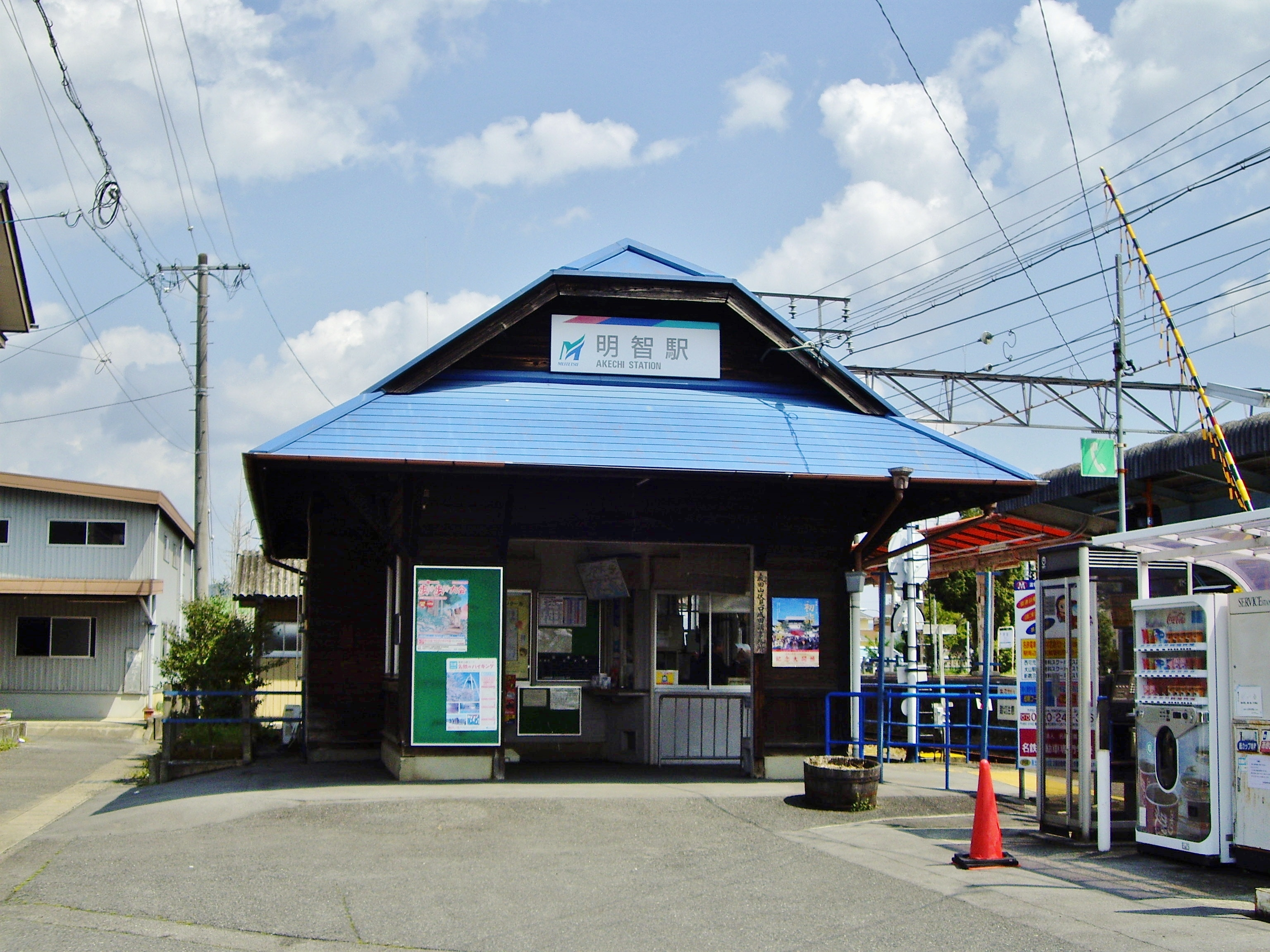
- Akechi Station, April 2008

General information
- Location: 26-4 Hiragaito, Kani-shi, Gifu-ken 509-0217; Japan
- Coordinates: 35.4332°N 137.087°E
- Operator: Meitetsu
- Line: ■Meitetsu Hiromi Line
- Distance: 18.4 km from Inuyama
- Platforms: 1 island + 1 side platform

Other information
- Status: Unstaffed
- Station code: HM07
- Website: Official website (in Japanese)

History
- Opened: August 21, 1920
- Former names: Fushimiguchi Station (to 1982)

Passengers
- FY2013: 853

Services
Preceding station	Meitetsu	Following station
Shin Kani towards Inuyama	Hiromi Line Local	Gōdo towards Mitake
Location
- Location within Gifu Prefecture Location within Japan

Akechi Station (明智駅, Akechi-eki) is a railway station located in the city of Kani, Gifu Prefecture, Japan, operated by the private railway operator Meitetsu.

== Lines ==
Akechi Station is a station on the Hiromi Line, and is located 18.4 kilometers from the terminus of the line at Inuyama.

== Station layout ==
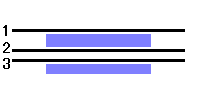
← Shin Kani	Gōdo →

Akechi Station has one ground-level side platform and one island platform connected to the station building by a level crossing. The station is unattended.

=== Platforms ===
1	■ Meitetsu Hiromi Line	(not in normal use)
2	■ Meitetsu Hiromi Line	For Mitake
3	■ Meitetsu Hiromi Line	For Shin Kani

== History ==
Akechi Station opened on August 21, 1920, as Fushimi Station (伏見口駅). It was renamed to its present name on April 1, 1982.

== Surrounding area ==
- National Route 21

== See also ==
- List of railway stations in Japan
