= Mitake Station =

Mitake Station is the name of two train stations in Japan:

- Mitake Station (Gifu)
- Mitake Station (Tokyo)
