= Mitakeguchi Station =

Railway station in Mitake, Gifu Prefecture, Japan

Mitakeguchi Station 御嵩口駅

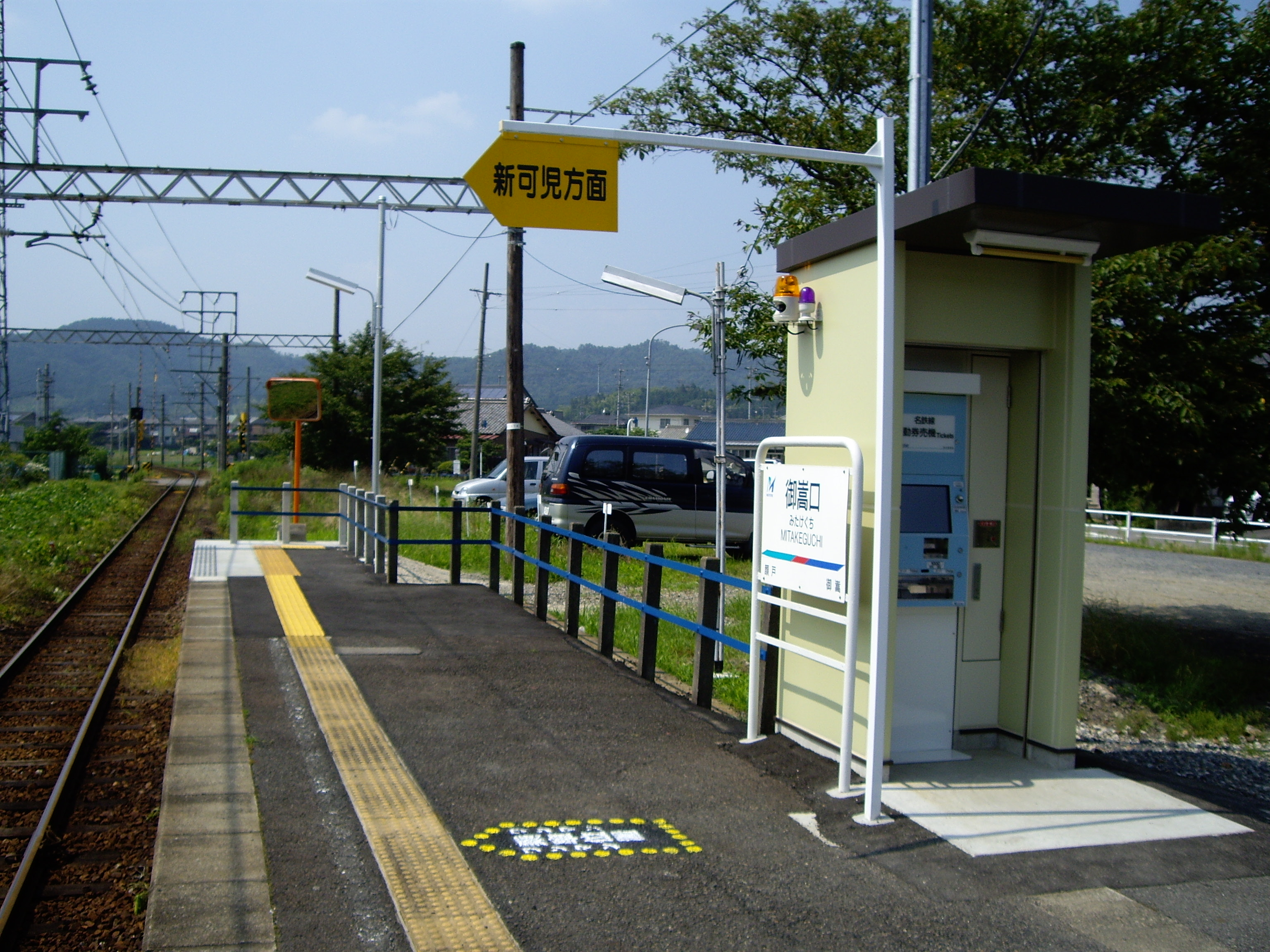
- Ticket vending machine and part of platform, July 2008

General information
- Location: 473 Naka, Mitake-chō, Kani-gun, Gifu-ken 505-0121; Japan
- Coordinates: 35.4314°N 137.1219°E
- Operator: Meitetsu
- Line: ■Meitetsu Hiromi Line
- Distance: 21.7 km from Inuyama
- Platforms: 1 side platform

Other information
- Status: Unstaffed
- Station code: HM09
- Website: Official website (in Japanese)

History
- Opened: August 21, 1920
- Former names: Mitake Station (to 1952)

Passengers
- FY2013: 336

Services
Preceding station	Meitetsu	Following station
Gōdo towards Inuyama	Hiromi Line Local	Mitake Terminus
Location
- Location within Gifu Prefecture Location within Japan

Mitakeguchi Station (御嵩口駅, Mitakeguchi-eki) is a railway station located in the town of Mitake, Gifu Prefecture, Japan, operated by the private railway operator Meitetsu.

== Lines ==
Mitakeguchi Station is a station on the Hiromi Line, and is located 21.7 kilometers from the terminus of the line at Inuyama.

== Station layout ==
Mitakeguchi Station has one ground-level side platform serving a single bi-directional track. There is no station building. The station is unattended.

== History ==
Mitakeguchi Station opened on August 21, 1920 as Mitake Station (御嵩駅, Mitake-eki). It was renamed to its present name on April 1, 1952.

== Surrounding area ==
- Japan National Route 21

== See also ==
- List of railway stations in Japan
