= Minase =

Minase may refer to:

== People ==
- Inori Minase (水瀬 いのり) (born 1995), Japanese actress, voice actress, and singer
- Yuki Minase, Japanese idol and former member of Yumemiru Adolescence
- Minase Yashiro (八代 みなせ) (born 1985), Japanese gravure idol and actress

== Character ==
- Nayuki Minase a character from the visual novel Kanon (video game)
- Minase Rio, Japanese Virtual YouTuber associated with Hololive Production

== Places ==
- Minase, Akita (皆瀬村, Minase-mura), former village in Ogachi District, Akita, Japan
- Minase Dam (皆瀬ダム, Minase-damu), rockfill dam located in Akita Prefecture in Japan
- Minase Shrine (水無瀬神宮, Minase jingū), Shinto shrine in Shimamoto, Mishima District, Osaka Prefecture, Japan
- Minase Station (水無瀬駅, Minase-eki), train station in Shimamoto

== Other uses ==
- Minase, a discontinued Japanese Sendai-class cruiser
