= Mitake, Gifu =

Mitake 御嵩町
- Town
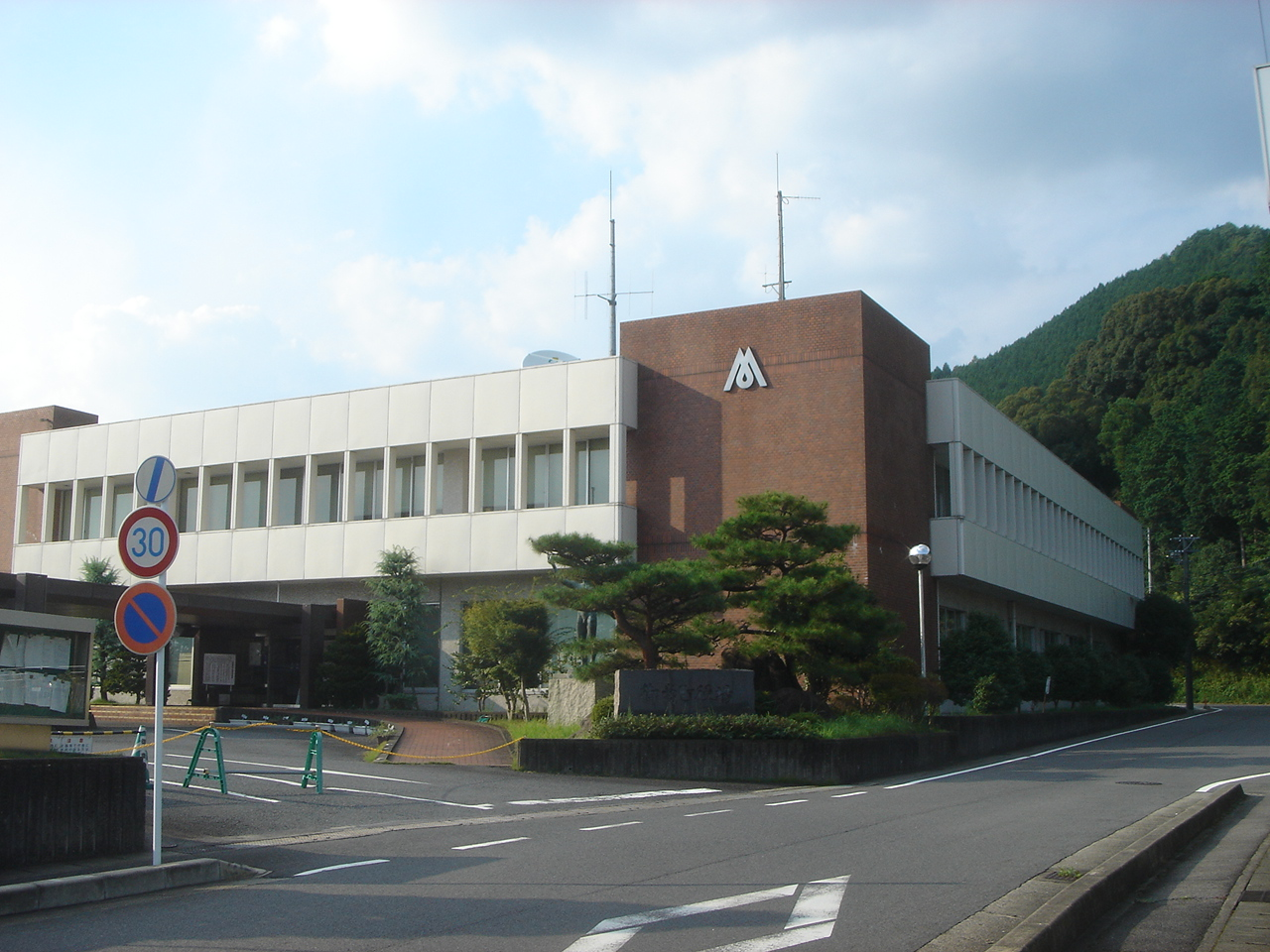
- Mitake Town Hall

- Flag Seal

- Location of Mitake in Gifu Prefecture

- Coordinates: 35°26′3.9″N 137°07′50.6″E
- Country: Japan
- Region: Chūbu
- Prefecture: Gifu
- District: Kani

Government
  - Mayor: Kimio Watanabe

Area
  - Total: 56.69 km^{2} (21.89 sq mi)

Population (January 1, 2019)
  - Total: 18,363
  - Density: 323.9/km^{2} (838.9/sq mi)
- Time zone: UTC+9 (Japan Standard Time)
- City symbols
- Tree: Japanese red pine
- Flower: Chrysanthemum morifolium
- Phone number: 0574-67-2111
- Address: Mitake 1239-1, Mitake-chō, Kani-gun, Gifu-ken 505-0192
- Website: Official website (in Japanese)

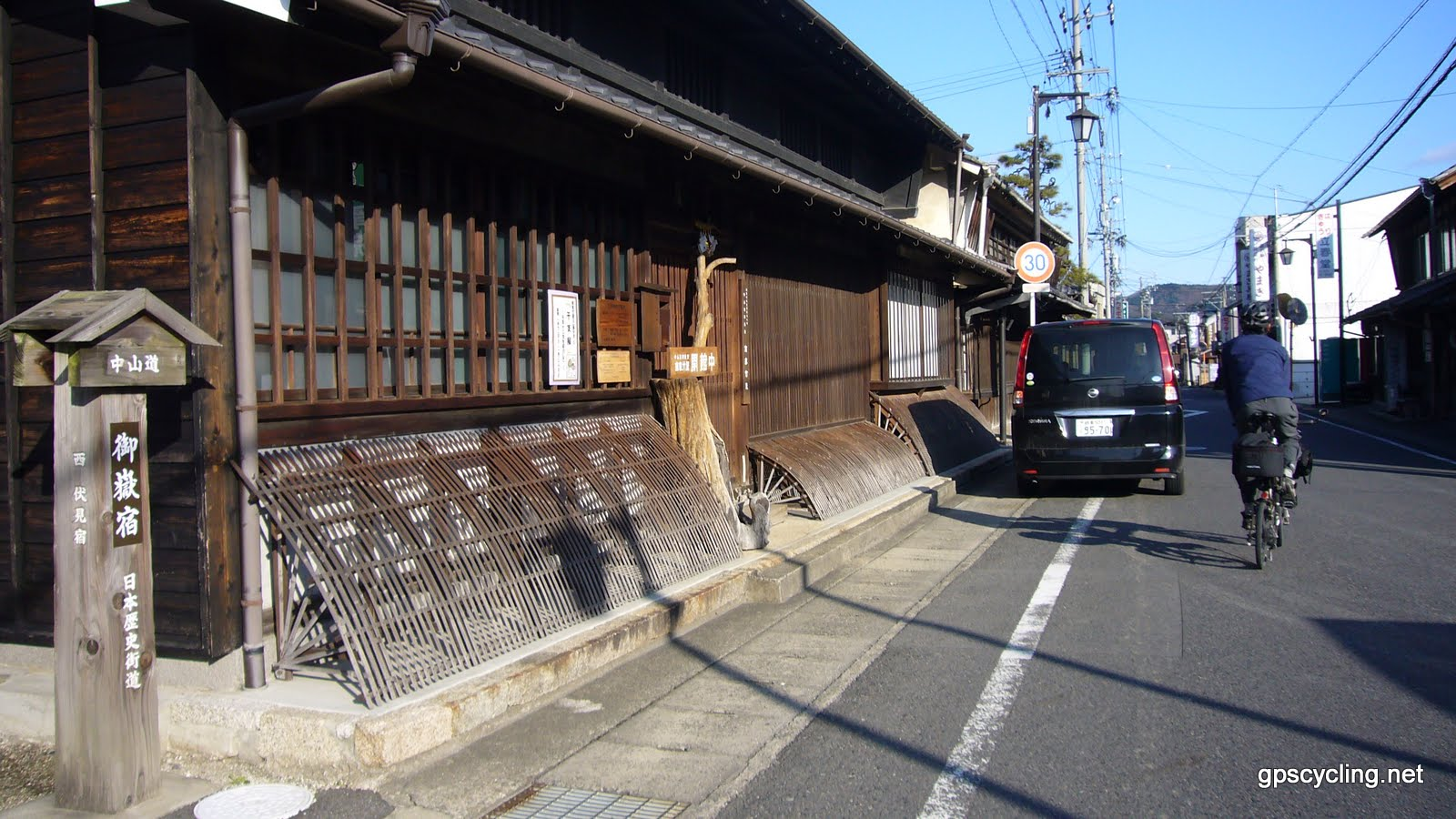
Mitake-juku

Mitake (御嵩町, Mitake-chō) is a town located in Kani District, Gifu Prefecture, Japan. As of 1 January 2019, the town had an estimated population of 18,363 and a population density of 330 persons per km^{2}, in 7,348 households. The total area of the town was 56.69 square kilometres (21.89 sq mi).

== Geography ==
Mitake is located at the edge of the Nōbi Plain in south-central Gifu Prefecture. The Kiso River runs through the town. The town has a climate characterized by characterized by hot and humid summers, and mild winters (Köppen climate classification Cfa). The average annual temperature in Mitake is 14.9 °C. The average annual rainfall is 1986 mm with September as the wettest month. The temperatures are highest on average in August, at around 27.5 °C, and lowest in January, at around 3.0 °C.

=== Neighbouring municipalities ===
- Gifu Prefecture
  - Kani
  - Minokamo
  - Mizunami
  - Toki
  - Yaotsu

== Demographics ==
Per Japanese census data, the population of Mitake peaked around the year 2000 and has declined slightly since.

Historical population
Year	Pop.	±%
1970	14,798	—
1980	16,794	+13.5%
1990	18,830	+12.1%
2000	19,653	+4.4%
2010	18,824	−4.2%
2020	17,516	−6.9%

== History ==
The area around Mitake was part of traditional Mino Province. During the Edo period, Fushimi-juku and Mitake-juku prospered as post stations on the Nakasendō highway connecting Edo with Kyoto. During the post-Meiji restoration cadastral reforms, the area was organised into Kani District, Gifu Prefecture. The town of Mitake was formed in 1889 with the establishment of the modern municipalities system. On February 1, 1955, Mitake absorbed the neighbouring towns on Fushimi and Naka, and the village of Kaminogo.

== Economy ==
Mitake was once a major producing area of lignite coal, with more than 100 coal mines operating during its peak around 1947, producing more than a quarter of the nation's output; however by 1968 the last mines closed. Land subsidence is now a growing problem in the town.

== Education ==
Mitake has three public elementary schools and three public middle school operated by the town government and one public junior high school operated by neighbouring Kani city. The town has two public high schools operated by the Gifu Prefectural Board of Education.

== Transportation ==
=== Railway ===
- Meitetsu - Hiromi Line
  - Gōdo - Mitakeguchi - Mitake

=== Highway ===
The town is not located on any national highways.
