= Kani River =

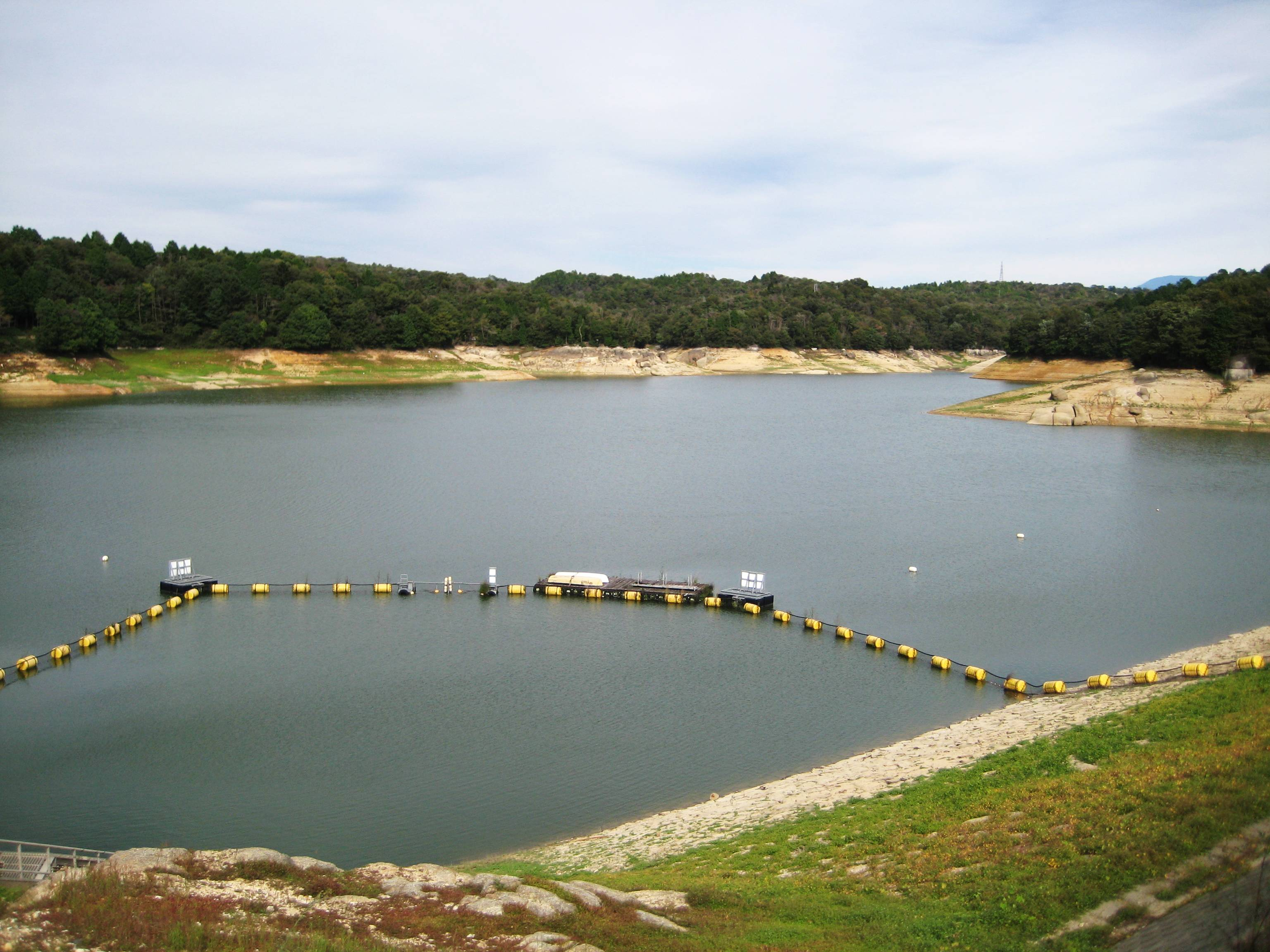
- Lake at Matsuno Dam on the Kani River

- Native name: 可児川 (Japanese)

Location
- Country: Japan

Physical characteristics
- Source
  - location: Mizunami, Gifu
- Mouth
  - location: Kiso River

Basin features
- River system: Kiso River

The Kani River (可児川, Kani-gawa) is a river in Japan which originates in the city of Mizunami in Gifu Prefecture, and flows into the Kiso River.

== Geography ==
The river originates in the western portion of Mizunami, and flows through the city of Kani. On the upper portion of the river, the Kobuchi Dam was constructed to improve flood control and protect the water for agricultural use.
