= Meitetsu Hiromi Line =

Railway line in Aichi Prefecture, Japan

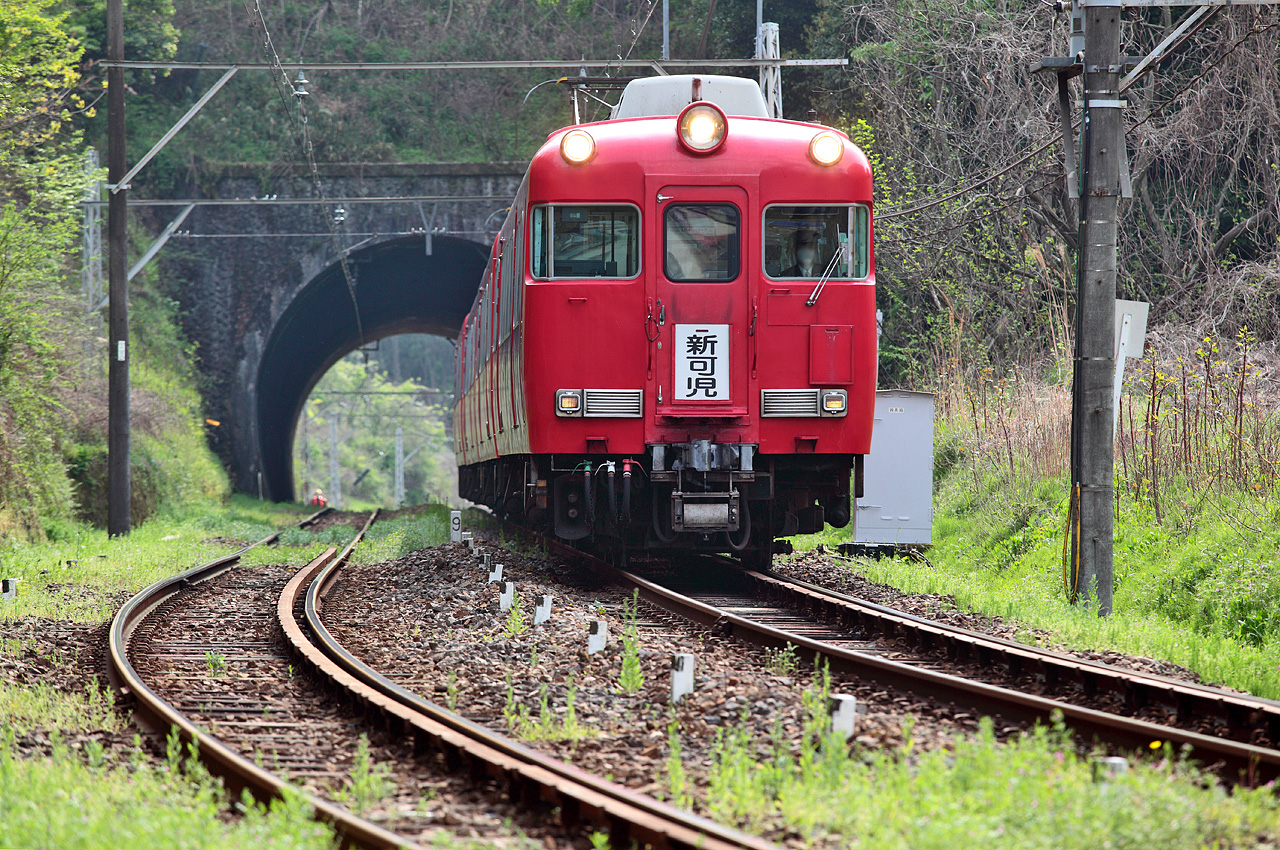
- A Meitetsu 7700 series EMU on the Hiromi Line train near Aigi Tunnel, between Zenjino and Nishi Kani stations in April 2009

Overview
- Native name: 名鉄広見線
- Owner: Meitetsu
- Locale: Aichi Prefecture, Gifu Prefecture
- Termini: Inuyama; Mitake
- Stations: 11

Service
- Type: Commuter rail
- Daily ridership: 6,521 (2008)

History
- Opened: 1920; 106 years ago

Technical
- Line length: 22.3 km (13.86 mi)
- Track gauge: 1,067 mm (3 ft 6 in)
- Old gauge: 762 mm (2 ft 6 in)
- Electrification: 1,500 V DC, overhead catenary
- Operating speed: 90 km/h (55 mph)

The Meitetsu Hiromi Line (名鉄広見線, Meitetsu Hiromi-sen) is a railway line in Japan operated by the private railway operator Meitetsu (Nagoya Railroad). It connects Inuyama Station in Inuyama, Aichi with Mitake Station in Mitake, Gifu.

== Services ==
The Meitetsu Hiromi Line operates in two sections, with through passengers required to change trains and pass through a transfer gate at Shin Kani Station.

Section	Approximate train frequency	Through services
Inuyama to Shin Kani	15 minutes (Early morning/late night: 20–30 minutes)	Weekday morning peak, inbound services only: To Meitetsu Nagoya and onwards via Meitetsu Inuyama Line, including 2 μSKY Limited Express services to Central Japan International Airport (Centrair)
Shin Kani to Mitake	30 minutes	-

Manaca and other Nationwide Mutual Usage Service IC cards are only available for use between Inuyama and Shin Kani.

== Stations ==
● Local: Local (普通, futsū) services stop at every station.
● μSKY: μSKY Limited Express (ミュースカイ, myū sukai) services to Central Japan International Airport (Centrair).

Through services other than μSKY Limited Express operate as Local services on the Hiromi Line, stopping at all stations between Shin Kani and Inuyama, then continue on the Meitetsu Inuyama Line as an Express or Rapid Express service.

All trains stop at stations marked "●" and pass stations marked "|".

No.	Name	Japanese	Distance (km)	Local	μSKY	Transfers	Location	
IY15	Inuyama	犬山	0.0	●	●	Inuyama Line; Komaki Line	Inuyama	Aichi
HM01	Tomioka-mae	富岡前	1.9	●	|		Inuyama	Aichi
HM02	Zenjino	善師野	4.0	●	|		Inuyama	Aichi
HM03	Nishi Kani	西可児	7.7	●	●		Kani	Gifu
HM04	Kanigawa	可児川	9.7	●	●		Kani	Gifu
HM05	Nihonrain-imawatari	日本ライン今渡	12.2	●	●		Kani	Gifu
HM06	Shin Kani	新可児	14.9	●	●	Taita Line (Kani Station)	Kani	Gifu
HM07	Akechi	明智	18.4	●			Kani	Gifu
HM08	Gōdo	顔戸	20.0	●			Mitake	Gifu
HM09	Mitakeguchi	御嵩口	21.7	●			Mitake	Gifu
HM10	Mitake	御嵩	22.3	●			Mitake	Gifu

=== Closed stations ===
- Aiki Station (between Zenjino and Katabira)
- Katabira Station (between Aiki and Nishi Kani)
- Harusato Station (between Nishi Kani and Kanigawa)
- Maeba Station (between Shin Kani and Gakkōmae)
- Gakkōmae Station (between Maeba and Akechi)

== History ==
The Shin Kani to Hiromi section was opened in 1920 by the Tobi Railway as a 762 mm (2 ft 6 in) gauge light railway. In 1928, the line was converted to 1,067 mm (3 ft 6 in) gauge, electrified at 600 V DC, and extended to Inuyama. The company merged with Meitetsu in 1943. The voltage was raised to 1,500 V DC in 1965, and the Inuyama to Shin Kani section was double-tracked between 1967 and 1970. Freight services ceased in 1982.

In 2007, all stations from Inuyama to Shin Kani began to accept the Tranpass prepaid magnetic fare card, transitioned to the manaca system in 2011.

From June 29, 2008, the line will be split into two sections at Shin Kani, with through passengers required to change trains and pass through a transfer gate at Shin Kani due to the introduction of one-person operation on the Shin Kani–Mitake portion of the line.

From March 18, 2023, due to the removal of passing facilities at Akechi Station, only one train is permitted to enter the Shin Kani–Mitake section of line.

From March 16, 2024, the Inuyama–Shin Kani section also commenced one-person operation, but the two sections of line will not be connected and will continue to operate separately.

On August 3, 2026, it was officially announced that operations on the 7.4 km (4.6 mi) section between Shin Kani and Mitake are scheduled to cease on April 1, 2029, owing to declining ridership.

=== Former connecting lines ===
- Akechi Station: The Tobi Railway opened a 7 km (4.3 mi) line to Yaotsu, electrified at 600 V DC, in 1930. The company merged with Meitetsu in 1943. Between 1952 and 1954, the line was extended to Nishikori to supply construction materials for the Maruyama Dam and hydro-electric power station. The voltage was increased to 1,500 V DC in 1965, but the overhead catenary was decommissioned in 1984. DMUs were then operated on the line until it closed in 2001.

== See also ==
- List of railway lines in Japan
