= Minase Dam =

Dam in Akita Prefecture, Japan

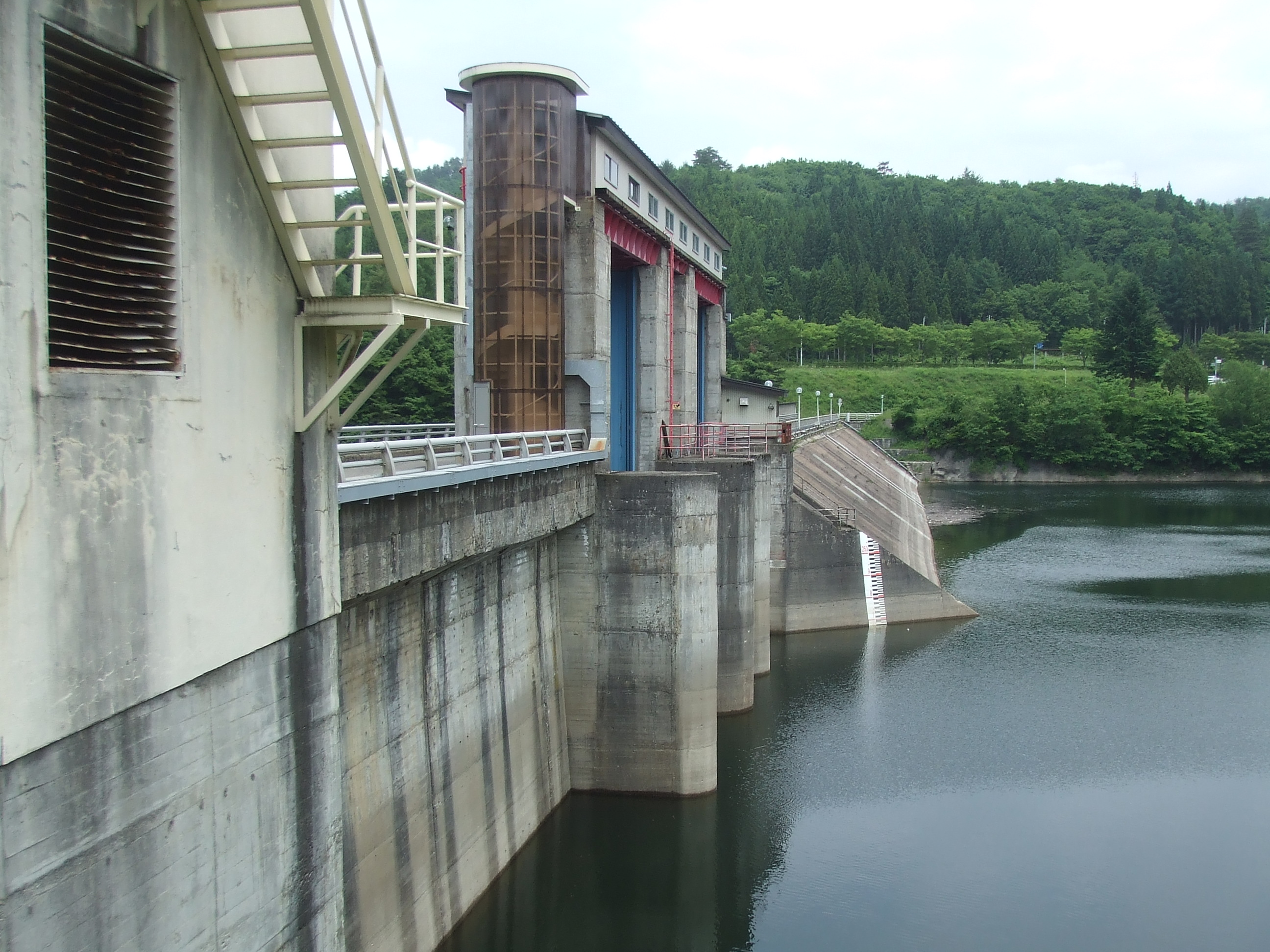

- Location within Japan
- Location: Akita Prefecture, Japan
- Coordinates: 39°3′24″N 140°37′47″E
- Construction began: 1957
- Opening date: 1963

Dam and spillways
- Height: 66.5 m (218 ft)
- Length: 215 m (705 ft)

Reservoir
- Total capacity: 31600 thousand cubic meters
- Catchment area: 172 sq. km
- Surface area: 150 hectares

Minase Dam is a rockfill dam located in Akita Prefecture in Japan. The dam is used for flood control, irrigation and power production. The catchment area of the dam is 172 km^{2}. The dam impounds about 150 ha of land when full and can store 31600 thousand cubic meters of water. The construction of the dam was started on 1957 and completed in 1963.
