= Kani, Gifu =

Kani 可児市
- City
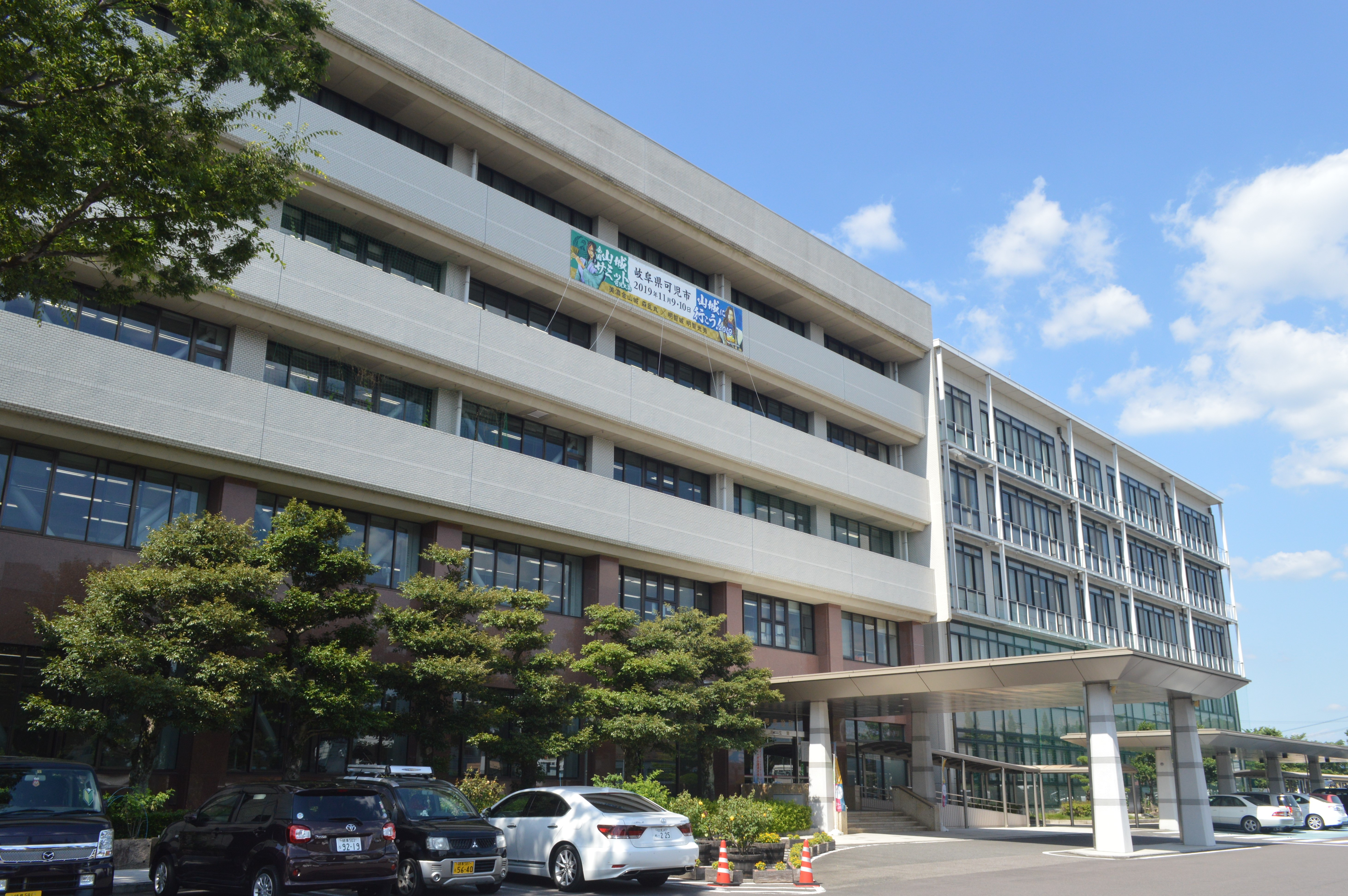
- Kani City Hall

- Flag Seal

- Location of Kani in Gifu Prefecture

- Coordinates: 35°25′33.8″N 137°03′40.8″E
- Country: Japan
- Region: Chūbu
- Prefecture: Gifu

Government
  - Mayor: Shigeki Tomida

Area
  - Total: 87.57 km^{2} (33.81 sq mi)

Population (April 1, 2024)
  - Total: 99,826
  - Density: 1,140/km^{2} (2,952/sq mi)
- Time zone: UTC+9 (Japan Standard Time)
- City symbols
- Tree: Japanese black pine
- Flower: Satsuki azalea and rose
- Phone number: 0574-62-1111
- Address: Hiromi 1-1, Kani-shi, Gifu-ken 509-0292
- Website: Official website

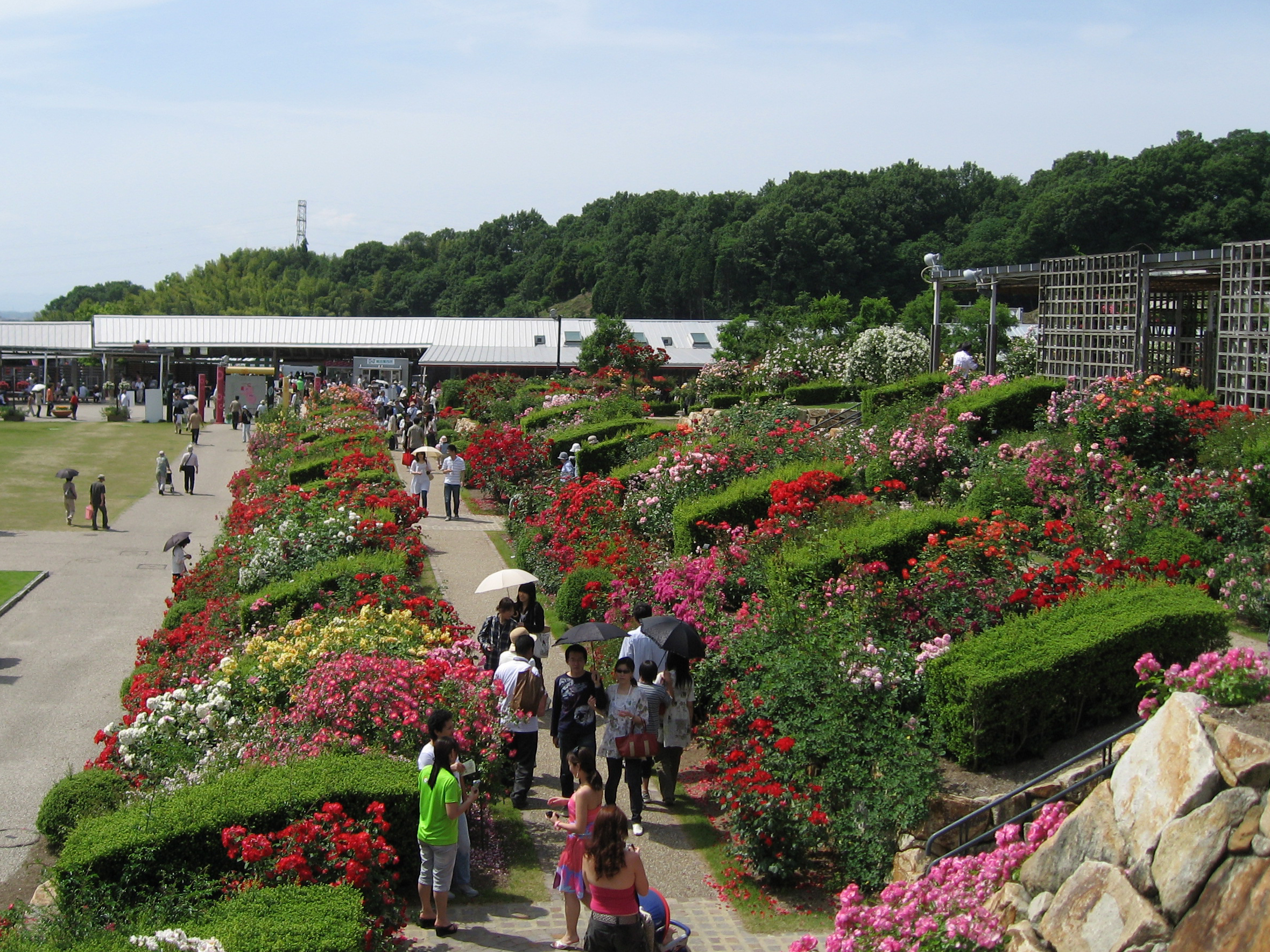
Flower Festival Commemorative Park

Kani (可児市, Kani-shi) is a city located in Gifu, Japan. As of 1 April 2024, the city had an estimated population of 99,826 and a population density of 1100 persons per km^{2}, in 42,286 households. The total area of the city was 87.57 square kilometres (33.81 sq mi).

== Geography ==
Kani is located in the south-central Gifu Prefecture, about 30 km from either Gifu city or Nagoya city, in the Kani basin. The Kiso River flows in the northern part of the city and roughly flat terrain continues to the Ota Basin on the opposite bank. The eastern portion of the city is hilly, and has many golf courses (golf courses occupy nearly 10% of the city area).

=== Climate ===
The city has a climate characterized by characterized by hot and humid summers, and mild winters (Köppen climate classification Cfa). The average annual temperature in Kani is 15.0 °C. The average annual rainfall is 1984 mm with September as the wettest month. The temperatures are highest on average in August, at around 27.6 °C, and lowest in January, at around 3.2 °C.

=== Neighbouring municipalities ===
- Aichi Prefecture
  - Inuyama
- Gifu Prefecture
  - Minokamo
  - Mitake
  - Sakahogi
  - Tajimi
  - Toki
  - Yaotsu

== Demographics ==
Per Japanese census data, the population of Kani has recently plateaued after a period of rapid growth.

Historical population
Year	Pop.	±%
1970	30,390	—
1980	57,290	+88.5%
1990	81,968	+43.1%
2000	93,463	+14.0%
2010	97,436	+4.3%
2020	99,968	+2.6%

== History ==
The area around Kani was part of traditional Mino Province. During the Edo period, the area was divided between the holding of Owari Domain and tenryō territory under direct control of the Tokugawa shogunate. The Nakasendō highway connecting Edo and Kyoto passed through the area, with several post stations located in what is now Kani. In the post-Meiji restoration cadastral reforms, Kani District in Gifu prefecture was created, and with the establishment of the modern municipalities system on July 1, 1889 the town of Imawatari was created. On February 1, 1955, Imawatari merged with the villages of Dota, Katabira, Harusato, Kukuri, Hiromaki and Hiromi to form the town of Kani. On April 1, 1982 Kani was raised to city status. On May 1, 2005, the town of Kaneyama (also from Kani District) was merged into Kani.

== Government ==
Kani has a mayor-council form of government with a directly elected mayor and a unicameral city legislature of 22 members.

== Economy ==
The population of Kani has increased rapidly over the past 40 years as a bedroom community for Gifu and Nagoya. Local industry is dominated by manufacturers of automobile parts.

== Education ==
Kani has 11 public elementary schools and 5 public middle schools operated by the city government, and one private elementary and one private junior high school. The city has two public high schools operated by the Gifu Prefectural Board of Education and one private high school. Both Meijo University and the Gifu University of Medical Science have a campus in Kani.

The Sociedade Educacional Brazilian School (ソシエダーデ・エドカショナル・ブラジリアン・スクール) - Brazilian school is an international school located in Kani.

== Transportation ==
=== Railway ===
- JR Central - Taita Line
  - Shimogiri - Kani
- Meitetsu Hiromi Line
  - Nishi Kani - Kanigawa - Nihonrain-imawatari - Shin Kani - Akechi

=== Highway ===
- National Route 21
- National Route 41
- National Route 248

== Sister cities ==
- (Northern Mariana Islands) Rota, Northern Marianas, since 1995
- Redland City, Queensland, Australia, since November 2015
