= Shin Kani Station =

Railway station in Kani, Gifu Prefecture, Japan

Shin Kani Station 新可児駅

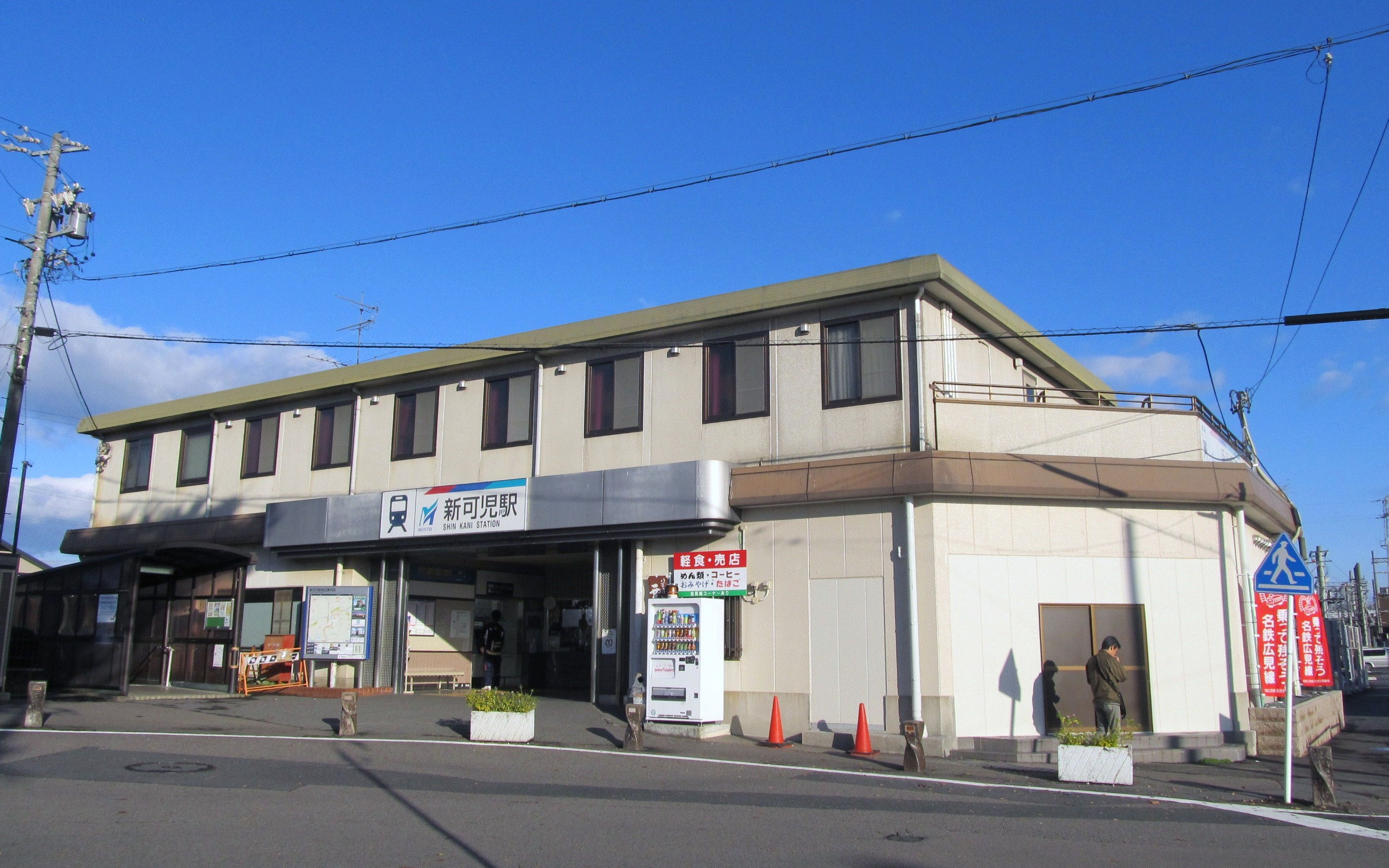
- Shin Kani station building in 2014

General information
- Location: 228 Shimoedo Imahiro, Kani-shi, Gifu-ken 509-0203; Japan
- Coordinates: 35.4233°N 137.0559°E
- Operator: Meitetsu
- Line: ■ Meitetsu Hiromi Line
- Distance: 14.9 km from Inuyama
- Platforms: 1 bay platform
- Tracks: 3

Other information
- Status: Staffed
- Station code: HM06
- Website: Official website

History
- Opened: 1 October 1928

Passengers
- FY2015: 2,510 daily

Services
Preceding station	Meitetsu	Following station
Nihonrain-imawatari towards Inuyama	Hiromi Line μSky Limited Express Local	Terminus
Nihonrain-imawatari towards Inuyama	Hiromi Line Local (for Mitake)	Akechi towards Mitake
Location
- Location within Gifu Prefecture Location within Japan

Shin Kani Station (新可児駅, Shin-Kani-eki) is a railway station on the Meitetsu Hiromi Line in the city of Kani, Gifu, Japan, operated by the private railway operator Nagoya Railroad (Meitetsu).

== Lines ==
Shin Kani Station is served by the Meitetsu Hiromi Line, and is located 14.9 kilometers from the starting point of the line at Inuyama. It is located close to Kani Station operated by JR Central on the Taita Line for Tajimi and Mino-Ōta.

== Layout ==
The station has a bay platform with two bays, serving three tracks. Platform 1 serves trains bound for Mitake. Although the line from Shin Kani to Mitake is a continuation of the same Hiromi Line from Inuyama, the lines are physically disconnected at Shin Kani Station and passengers wishing to go beyond Shin Kani must transfer at this station. There is a second wicket within the station for such passengers. Therefore, passengers transferring must pass through one set of gates, and passengers starting their trip at Shin Kani must pass through two sets of gates. Platform 1 supports trains with up to two cars, so only conductorless driver-only operation trains can go from Shin Kani to Mitake.

Platform 2 and Platform 3 both serve trains bound for Inuyama. Platform 2 can support trains with up to 4 cars, and Platform 3 can support trains with up to 6 cars.

There is one exit. When leaving, there is a convenience store on the left and ticket machines and a staff window on the right. A taxi stand is located outside on the station. JR Central Kani Station is located to the right.

=== Platforms ===
1	■ Meitetsu Hiromi Line	for Mitake
2,3	■ Meitetsu Hiromi Line	for Inuyama, Meitetsu Nagoya, and Central Japan International Airport

Station track diagram

== History ==
The station opened on 1 October 1928 as Hiromi Station (広見駅). It was renamed Shin Hiromi Station (新広見駅) on 16 February 1930, and was renamed Shin Kani Station on 1 April 1982.

== Surrounding area ==
- Kani Station (JR Central)
- Kani City Hall

== See also ==
- List of railway stations in Japan
