= Inuyama Station =

Railway station in Inuyama, Aichi Prefecture, Japan

Inuyama Station 犬山駅

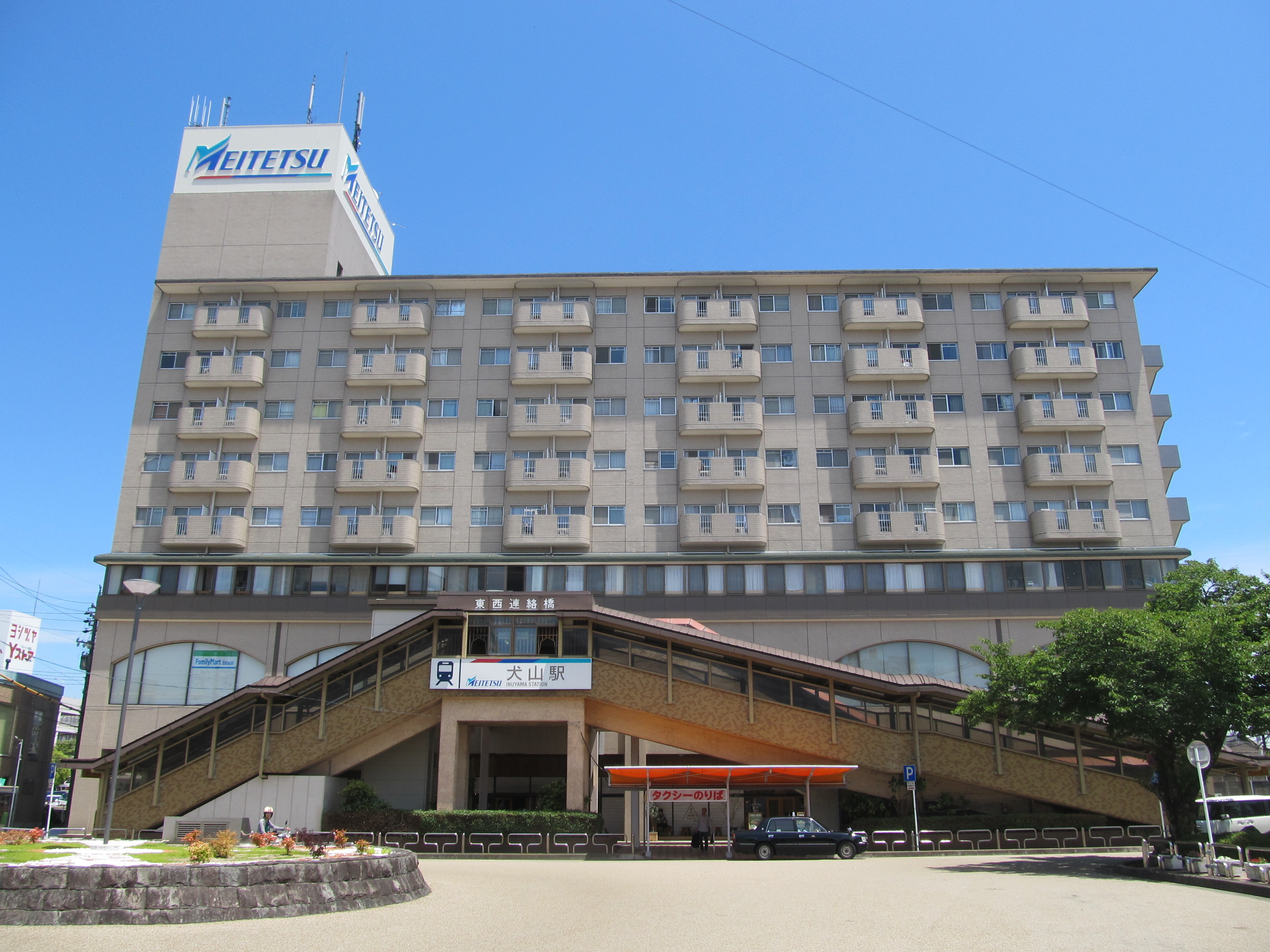
- Inuyama station in June 2018

General information
- Location: Fujimichō-14 Inuyama-shi, Aichi-ken 484-0081; Japan
- Coordinates: 35.3802373°N 136.9456637°E
- Operator: Meitetsu
- Lines: ■ Inuyama Line; ■ Komaki Line; ■ Hiromi Line
- Distance: 20.6 kilometers from Kamiiida
- Platforms: 3 island platforms

Other information
- Status: Staffed
- Station code: IY15
- Website: Official website

History
- Opened: August 8, 1912

Passengers
- FY2015: 17,050

Services
| Preceding station | Meitetsu | Following station |
|---|---|---|
| Kōnan towards Central Japan International Airport | μSky | Inuyama-Yūen towards Shin-Unuma |
| Kashiwamori One-way operation | μSky (last train for Shin-Unuma) | Inuyama-Yūen towards Shin-Unuma |
| Kashiwamori towards Shimo Otai | Inuyama Line Rapid Limited Express Limited Express | Inuyama-Yūen towards Shin-Unuma |
| Fusō towards Shimo Otai | Inuyama Line Rapid Express Express | Inuyama-Yūen towards Shin-Unuma |
| Inuyamaguchi towards Shimo Otai | Inuyama Line Semi Express Local | Inuyama-Yūen towards Shin-Unuma |
| through to Inuyama Line | Hiromi Line μSky Limited Express | Nishi Kani towards Shin Kani |
| through to Inuyama Line | Hiromi Line Local | Tomioka-mae towards Mitake |
| Terminus | Komaki Line | Haguro towards Kamiiida |
Location
- Location within Aichi Prefecture Location within Japan

Track Layout

Inuyama Station (犬山駅, Inuyama-eki) is a railway station in the city of Inuyama, Aichi Prefecture, Japan, operated by Meitetsu.

== Lines ==
Inuyama Station is served by the Meitetsu Komaki Line and is 20.6 kilometers from the starting point of the line at Kamiiida. It is also served by the Meitetsu Inuyama Line and is 29.4 kilometers from the starting point of the line at Biwajima. Inuyama station is also a terms of the 22.3 kilometer Meitetsu Hiromi Line.

== Station layout ==
The station has three elevated island platforms with an elevated station building. After a renovation completed in mid-December 2010, there are two wickets. The renovated portions of the station entered service on December 20, 2010, at which time the station became handicapped-accessible. Previously, there was one wicket, but after renovation this became the South Wicket, and the newly completed wicket became the North Wicket. The renovation also included new LED displays indicating the next trains arriving at the station, which replaced displays which mechanically flipped cards. There are two exits, the East Exit and the West Exit. The station has automated ticket machines, Manaca automated turnstiles and is staffed.

=== Platforms ===
| 1 | ■ Inuyama Line | from Meitetsu Nagoya for Shin Unuma, Meitetsu Gifu returning for Kōnan and Iwakura |
| 2 | ■ Inuyama Line | from Shin Unuma for Kōnan, Iwakura and Meitetsu Nagoya |
| 3 | ■ Komaki Line | returning for Komaki and Heian-dōri |
| 4; 5 | ■ Inuyama Line | returning for Shin Unuma and Meitetsu Gifu |
| 4; 5; 6 | ■ Inuyama Line | for Shin Kani, Meitetsu Nagoya and Meitetsu Gifu |
| 4; 5; 6 | ■ Hiromi Line | returning for Shin Kani |

== Station history ==
Inuyama Station opened on August 8, 1912.

== Passenger statistics ==
In fiscal 2015, the station was used by an average of 17,050 passengers daily.

== Surrounding area ==
- Inuyama Castle
- Inuyama City Hall

== See also ==
- List of railway stations in Japan
