= Mitake Station (Gifu) =

Railway station in Mitake, Gifu Prefecture, Japan

Mitake Station 御嵩駅

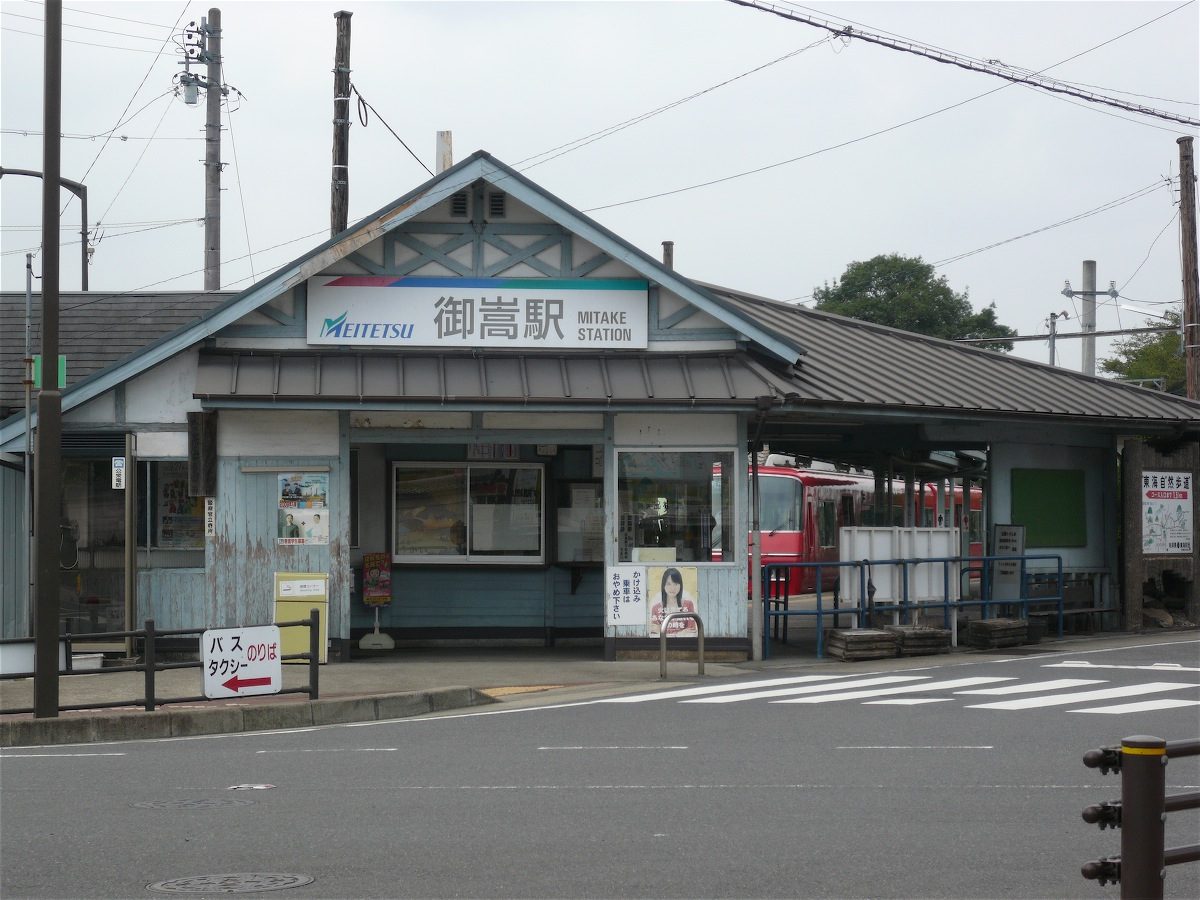
- Mitake Station, September 2007

General information
- Location: 2302-2 Naka, Mitake-chō, Kani-gun, Gifu-ken 505-0121; Japan
- Coordinates: 35.4296°N 137.1274°E
- Operator: Meitetsu
- Line: ■Meitetsu Hiromi Line
- Distance: 22.3 km from Inuyama
- Platforms: 1 side platform

Other information
- Status: Unstaffed
- Station code: HM10
- Website: Official website (in Japanese)

History
- Opened: July 1, 1952

Passengers
- FY2013: 1311

Services
Preceding station	Meitetsu	Following station
Mitakeguchi towards Inuyama	Hiromi Line Local	Terminus
Location
- Location within Gifu Prefecture Location within Japan

Mitake Station (御嵩駅, Mitake-eki) is a railway station located in the town of Mitake, Gifu Prefecture, Japan, operated by the private railway operator Meitetsu.

== Lines ==
Mitake Station is a terminal station of the Hiromi Line, and is located 22.3 kilometers from the opposing terminus of the line at Inuyama.

== Station layout ==
Mitake Station has a single ground-level dead-headed side platform. The station is unattended.

== History ==
Mitake Station opened on July 1, 1952.

== Surrounding area ==
- Mitake-juku

== See also ==
- List of railway stations in Japan
