= Kamiasō Station =

Railway station in Hichisō, Gifu Prefecture, Japan

Kamiasō Station 上麻生駅
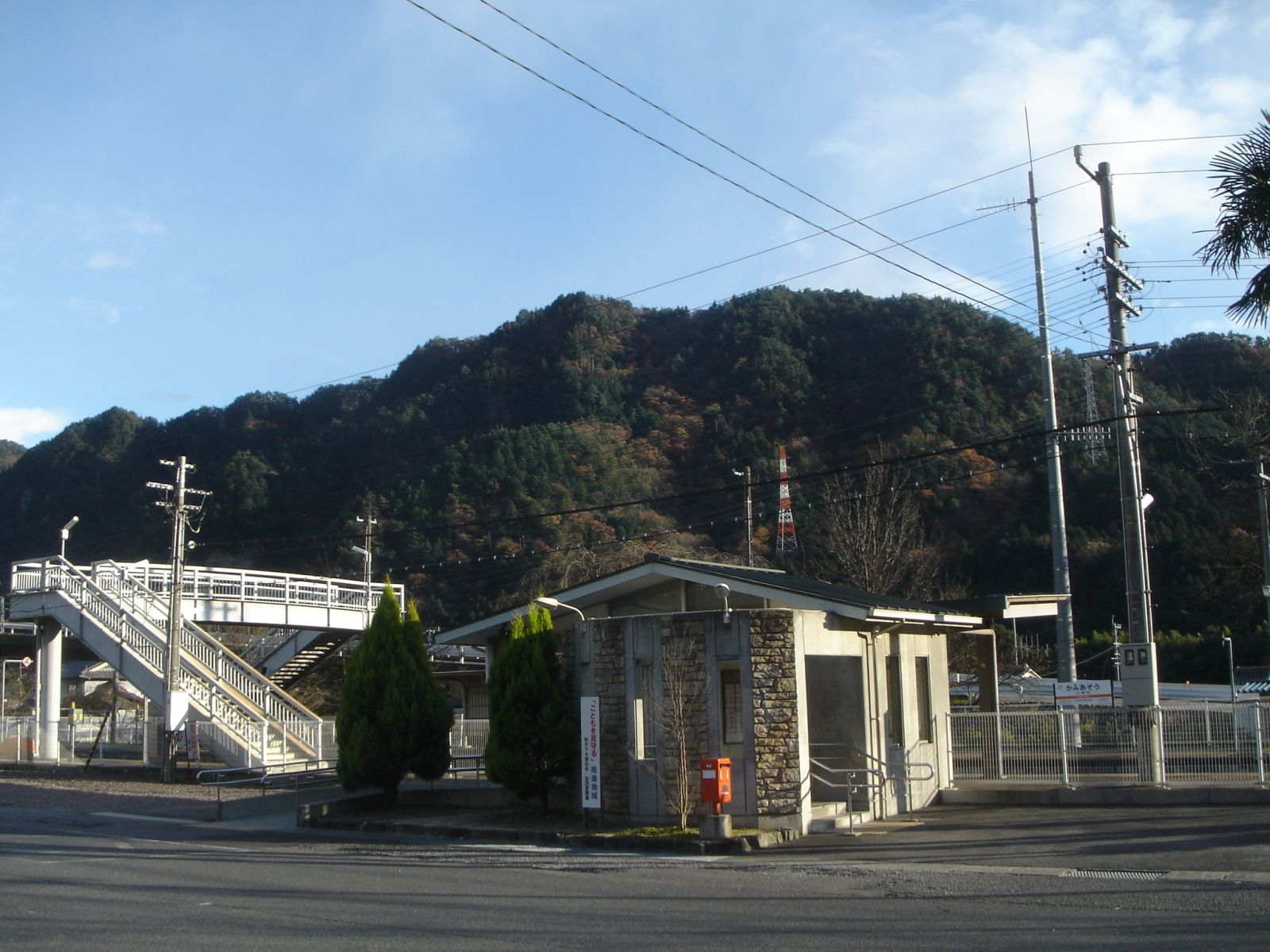
- Kamiasō Station in December 2008

General information
- Location: 2272 Kamiasō, Hichisō-cho, Kamo-gun, Gifu-ken 509-0401; Japan
- Coordinates: 35.5414°N 137.1186°E
- Operator: JR Central
- Line: Takayama Main Line
- Distance: 43.2 km from Gifu
- Platforms: 2 side platforms
- Tracks: 2

Other information
- Status: Unstaffed

History
- Opened: March 20, 1924; 102 years ago
Location
- Location within Gifu Prefecture Location within Japan

Kamiasō Station (上麻生駅, Kamiasō-eki) is a railway station on the Takayama Main Line in the town of Hichisō, Kamo District, Gifu Prefecture, Japan, operated by Central Japan Railway Company (JR Central).

== Lines ==
Kamiasō Station is served by the Takayama Main Line, and is located 43.2 kilometers from the official starting point of the line at Gifu.

== Station layout ==
Kamiasō Station has two opposed ground-level side platforms connected by a footbridge. The station is unattended.

=== Platforms ===
1	■ Takayama Main Line	for Gero and Takayama
2	■ Takayama Main Line	for Mino-Ōta and Gifu

== Adjacent stations ==
«	Service	»
Takayama Main Line
Limited Express "Hida": Does not stop at this station
Shimoasō	Local	Shirakawaguchi

== History ==
Kamiasō Station opened on March 20, 1924. The station was absorbed into the JR Central network upon the privatization of Japanese National Railways (JNR) on April 1, 1987.

== See also ==
- List of railway stations in Japan
