= Shimoyui Station =

Railway station in Shirakawa, Gifu Prefecture, Japan

Shimoyui Station 下油井駅
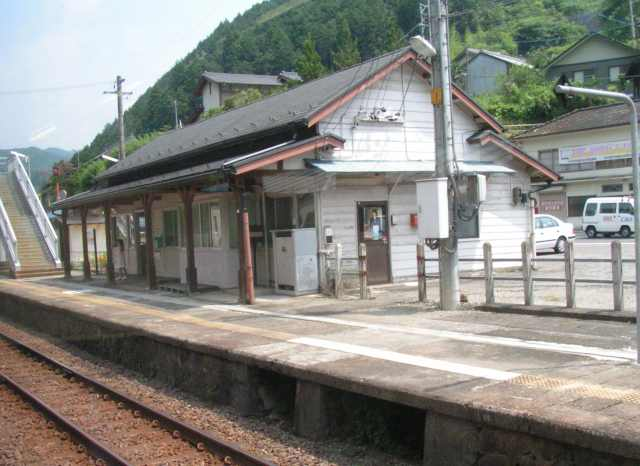
- Shimoyui Station in December 2011

General information
- Location: 1570 Shirayama, Shirakawa-cho, Kamo-gun, Gifu-ken 509-1101; Japan
- Coordinates: 35.6335°N 137.1834°E
- Operator: JR Central
- Line: ■ Takayama Main Line
- Distance: 61.7 km from Gifu
- Platforms: 2 side platforms
- Tracks: 2

Other information
- Status: Unstaffed

History
- Opened: March 21, 1928; 98 years ago
Location
- Location within Gifu Prefecture Location within Japan

Shimoyui Station (下油井駅, Shimoyui-eki) is a railway station on the Takayama Main Line in the town of Shirakawa, Kamo District, Gifu Prefecture, Japan, operated by Central Japan Railway Company (JR Central).

== Lines ==
Shimoyui Station is served by the JR Central Takayama Main Line, and is located 61.7 kilometers from the official starting point of the line at Gifu.

== Station layout ==
Shimoyui Station has two ground-level opposed side platforms connected by a footbridge. The station is unattended.

=== Platforms ===
1	■ Takayama Main Line	for Mino-Ōta and Gifu
2	■ Takayama Main Line	for Gero and Takayama

== Adjacent stations ==
«	Service	»
Takayama Main Line
Limited Express "Hida": Does not stop at this station
Shirakawaguchi	Local	Hida-Kanayama

== History ==
Shimoyui Station opened on March 21, 1928. The station was absorbed into the JR Central network upon the privatization of Japanese National Railways (JNR) on April 1, 1987.

== Surrounding area ==
- Hida River
- National Route 41

== See also ==
- List of railway stations in Japan
