= Shirakawaguchi Station =

Railway station in Shirakawa, Gifu Prefecture, Japan

Shirakawaguchi Station 白川口駅
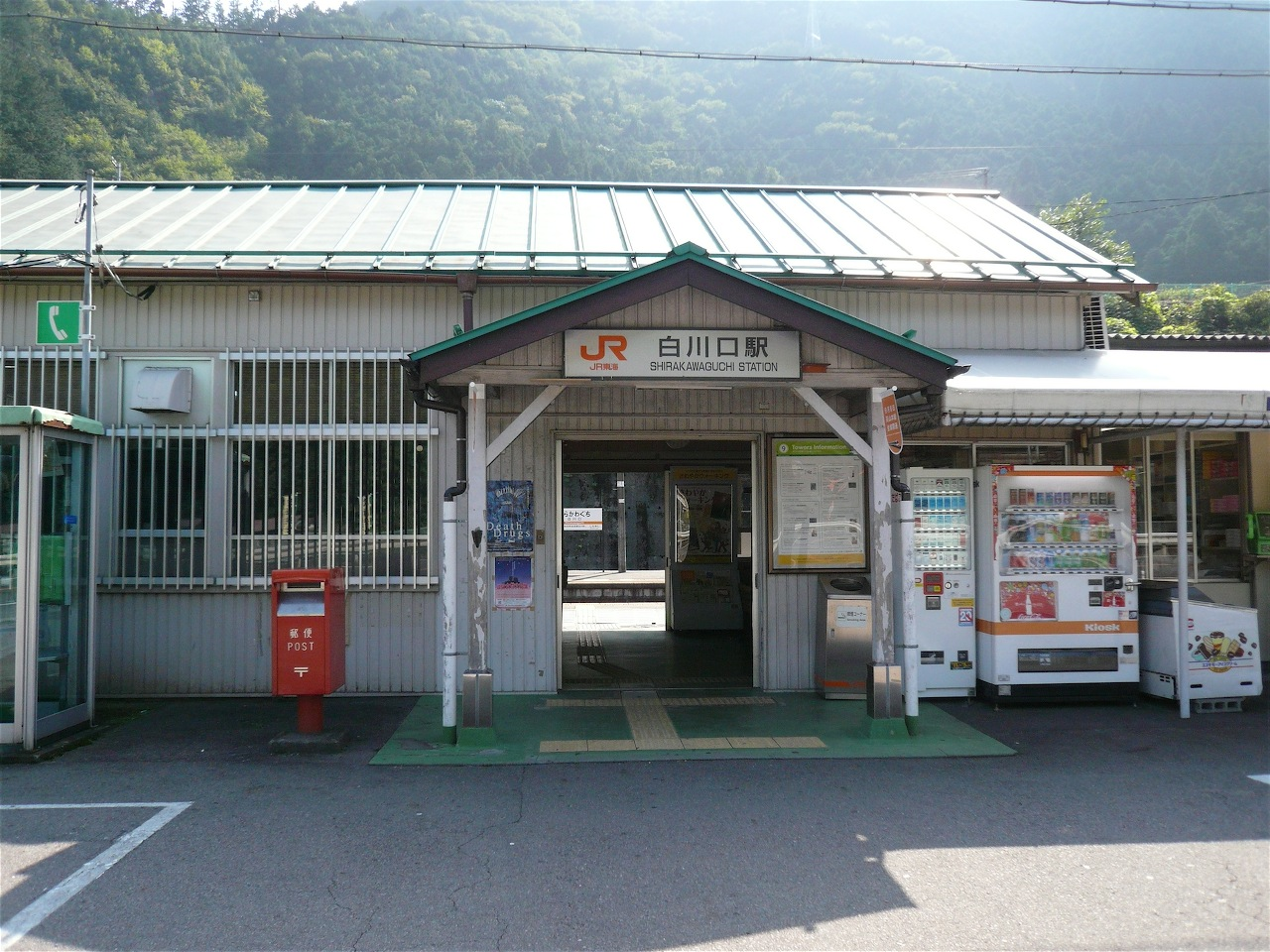
- Shirakawaguchi Station in September 2007

General information
- Location: Sakanohigashi, Shirakawa-cho, Kamo-gun, Gifu-ken 509-1106; Japan
- Coordinates: 35.5795°N 137.1851°E
- Operator: JR Central
- Line: ■ Takayama Main Line
- Distance: 53.1 km from Gifu
- Platforms: 1 island + 1 side platform
- Tracks: 3

Other information
- Status: Staffed

History
- Opened: December 28, 1918; 107 years ago

Passengers
- FY2016: 186 daily
Location
- Location within Japan

Shirakawaguchi Station (白川口駅, Shirakawaguchi-eki) is a railway station on the Takayama Main Line in the town of Shirakawa, Kamo District, Gifu Prefecture, Japan, operated by Central Japan Railway Company (JR Central).

== Lines ==
Shirakawaguchi Station is served by the JR Central Takayama Main Line, and is located 53.1 kilometers from the official starting point of the line at Gifu.

== Station layout ==
Shirakawaguchi Station has one ground-level island platform and one ground-level side platform connected by a footbridge. The station is staffed.

=== Platforms ===
1	■ Takayama Main Line	for Mino-Ōta and Gifu
2	■ Takayama Main Line	for Gero and Takayama
3	■ Takayama Main Line	(starting trains only)

== Adjacent stations ==
«	Service	»
Takayama Main Line
Kamiasō	Local	Shimoyui
Mino-Ōta	Limited Express Hida	Hida-Kanayama

== History ==
Shirakawaguchi Station opened on March 16, 1926. The station was absorbed into the JR Central network upon the privatization of Japanese National Railways (JNR) on April 1, 1987.

== Passenger statistics ==
In fiscal 2016, the station was used by an average of 186 passengers daily (boarding passengers only).

== Surrounding area ==
- Shirakawa Town Hall

== See also ==
- List of railway stations in Japan
