= Shimoasō Station =

Railway station in Kawabe, Gifu Prefecture, Japan

Shimoasō Station 下麻生駅
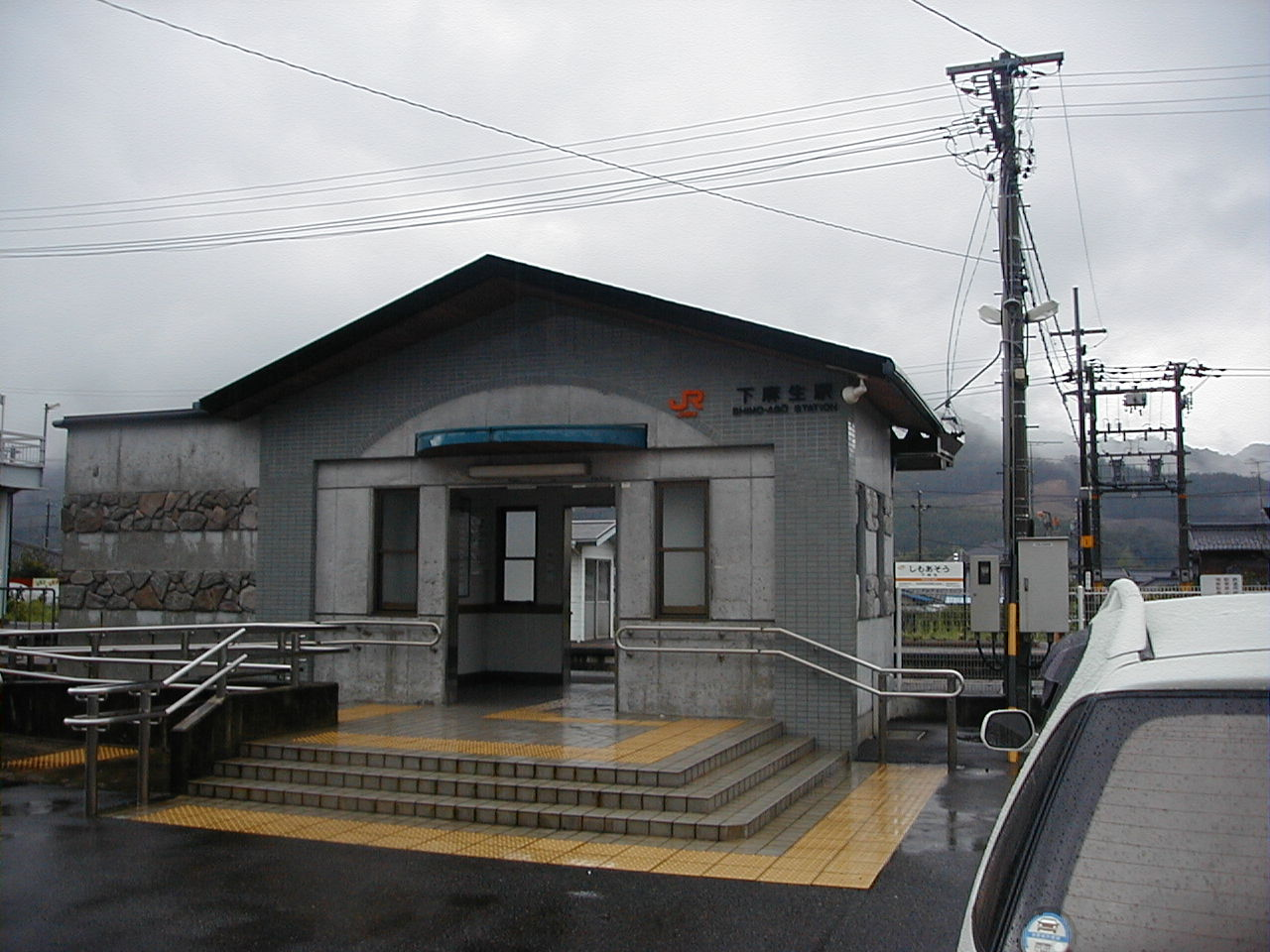
- Shimoasō Station in September 2009

General information
- Location: 295 Kitakawabe, Kawabe-cho, Kamo-guni, Gifu-ken 509-0302; Japan
- Coordinates: 35.5150°N 137.0870°E
- Operator: JR Central
- Line: Takayama Main Line
- Distance: 37.9 km from Gifu
- Platforms: 1 side + 1 island platforms
- Tracks: 3

Other information
- Status: Unstaffed

History
- Opened: November 25, 1922; 103 years ago
Location
- Location within Gifu Prefecture Location within Japan

Shimoasō Station (下麻生駅, Shimoasō-eki) is a railway station on the Takayama Main Line in the town of Kawabe, Kamo District, Gifu Prefecture, Japan, operated by Central Japan Railway Company (JR Central).

== Lines ==
Shimoasō Station is served by the Takayama Main Line, and is located 37.9 kilometers from the official starting point of the line at Gifu.

== Station layout ==
Shimoasō Station has one ground-level island platform and one ground level side platform connected by a footbridge. The station is unattended.

=== Platforms ===
| 1 | ■ Takayama Main Line | for Gero and Takayama |
| 2, 3 | ■ Takayama Main Line | for Mino-Ōta and Gifu |

== Adjacent stations ==
| « | Service | » |
Takayama Main Line
Limited Express "Hida": Does not stop at this station
| Nakakawabe | Local | Kamiasō |

== History ==
Shimoasō Station opened on November 25, 1922. The station was absorbed into the JR Central network upon the privatization of Japanese National Railways (JNR) on April 1, 1987.

== Surrounding area ==
- Kawabe Kita Elementary School
- Hida River

== See also ==
- List of railway stations in Japan
