= Utsubo Station =

Railway station in Hida, Gifu Prefecture, Japan

Utsubo Station 打保駅
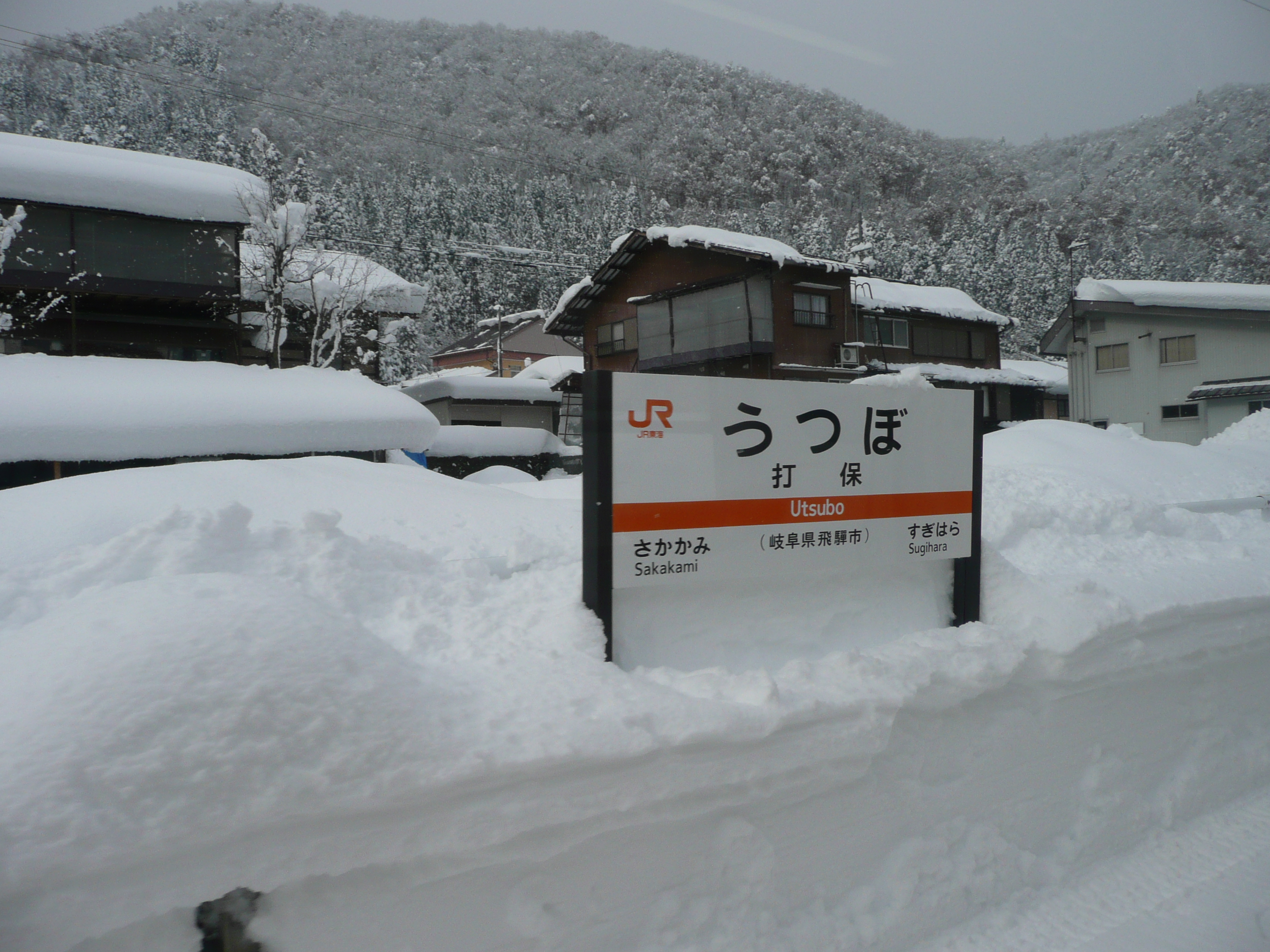
- Utsubo Station in December 2012

General information
- Location: Miyakawa-cho Utsubo, Hida-shi, Gifu-ken 509-4545; Japan
- Coordinates: 36.3841°N 137.1821°E
- Operator: JR Central
- Line: Takayama Main Line
- Distance: 176.5 km from Gifu
- Platforms: 2 side platforms
- Tracks: 2

Other information
- Status: Unstaffed

History
- Opened: November 12, 1933
Location
- Location within Gifu Prefecture Location within Japan

Utsubo Station (打保駅, Utsubo-eki) is a railway station on the Takayama Main Line in the city of Hida, Gifu Prefecture, Japan, operated by Central Japan Railway Company (JR Central).

== Lines ==
Utsubo Station is served by the JR Central Takayama Main Line, and is located 176.5 kilometers from the official starting point of the line at Gifu.

== Station layout ==
Utsubo Station has two opposed ground-level side platforms connected by a level crossing. The station is unattended.

=== Platforms ===
1	■ Takayama Main Line	for Toyama
2	■ Takayama Main Line	for Takayama and Gero

== Adjacent stations ==
«	Service	»
Takayama Main Line
Limited Express "Hida": Does not stop at this station
Sakakami	Local	Sugihara

== History ==
Utsubo Station opened on November 12, 1933. The station was absorbed into the JR Central network upon the privatization of the Japanese National Railways (JNR) on April 1, 1987.

== Surrounding area ==
- National Route 360

== See also ==
- List of railway stations in Japan
