= Nishi-Toyama Station =

Railway station in Toyama, Toyama Prefecture, Japan

Nishi-Toyama Station 西富山駅
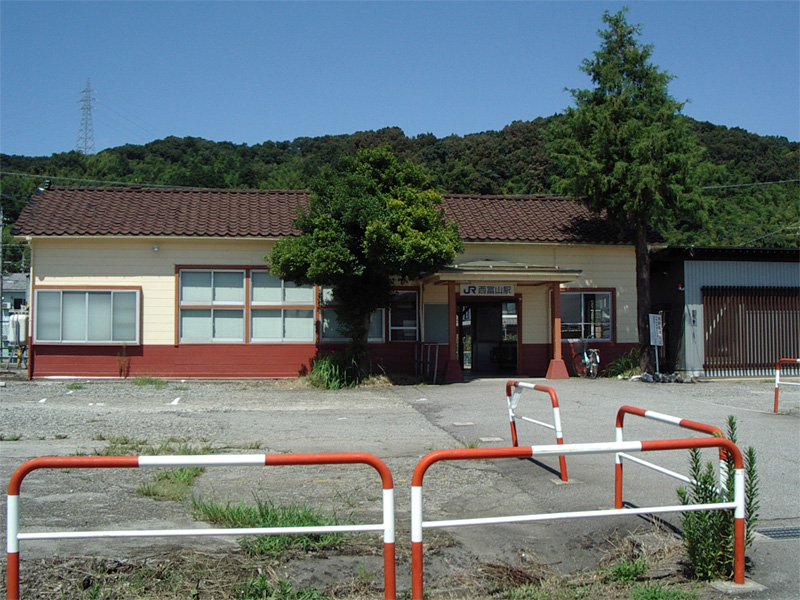
- Nishi-Toyama Station in August 2008

General information
- Location: 860 Teramachi, Toyama-shi, Toyama-ken 930-0874; Japan
- Coordinates: 36.6998°N 137.1774°E
- Operator: JR West; JR Freight
- Line: ■ Takayama Main Line
- Distance: 222.2 km from Gifu
- Platforms: 2 side platforms
- Tracks: 2

Construction
- Structure type: At grade

Other information
- Status: Unstaffed
- Website: Official website

History
- Opened: 1 September 1927

Passengers
- FY2015: 364 daily
Location
- Location within Japan

Nishi-Toyama Station (西富山駅, Nishi-Toyama-eki) is a railway station on the Takayama Main Line in city of Toyama, Japan, operated by West Japan Railway Company (JR West). It is also a freight terminal for the Japan Freight Railway Company.

== Lines ==
Nishi-Toyama Station is a station on the Takayama Main Line, and is located 222.2 kilometers from the end of the line at Gifu and 33.3 kilometers from the dividing point on the line between JR West and JR East at Inotani.

== Layout ==
The station has two ground-level opposed side platforms serving two tracks. The station is unattended.

=== Platforms ===
1	■ Takayama Main Line	for Inotani and Takaoka
2	■ Takayama Main Line	for Toyama

== Adjacent stations ==
«	Service	»
JR West
Takayama Main Line
Limited Express "Hida": Does not stop at this station
Fuchū-Usaka	Local	Toyama

== History ==
The station opened on 1 September 1927. With the privatization of Japanese National Railways (JNR) on 1 April 1987, the station came under the control of JR West.

== Passenger statistics ==
In fiscal 2015, the station was used by an average of 364 passengers daily (boarding passengers only).

== Surrounding area ==
- Toyama University Gofuku campus
- Toyama Industrial High School
- Toyama Commercial High School

== See also ==
- List of railway stations in Japan
