= Sakakami Station =

Railway station in Hida, Gifu Prefecture, Japan

Sakakami Station 坂上駅
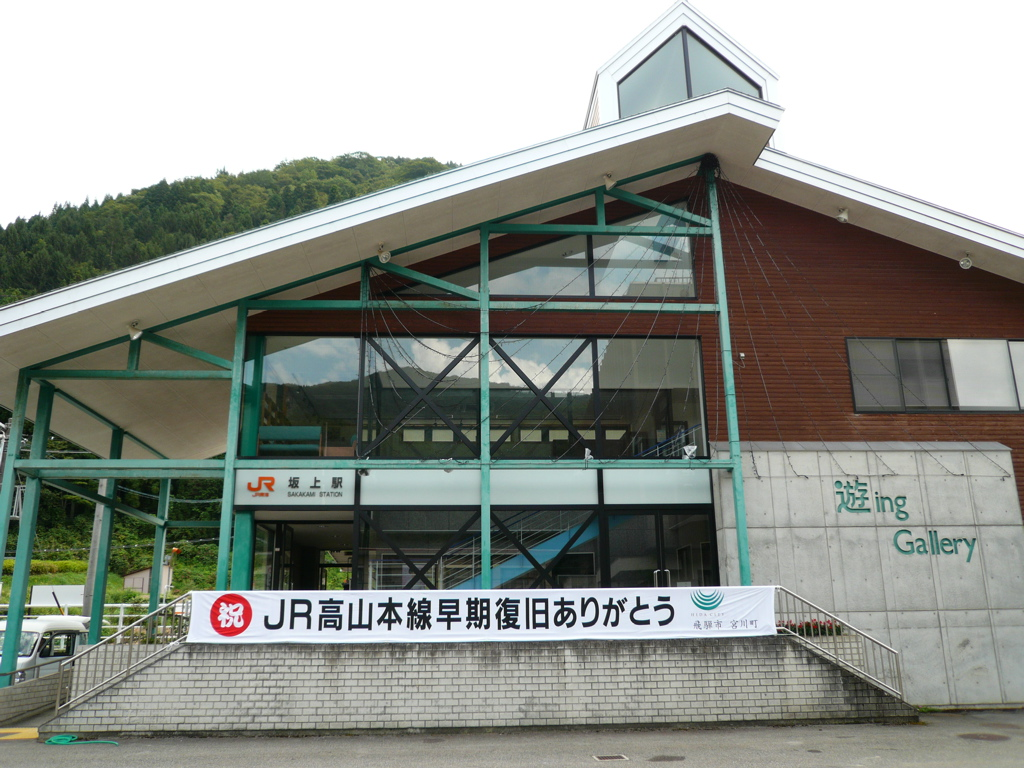
- Sakakami Station in September 2007

General information
- Location: Miyakawa-cho Hayashi, Hida-shi, Gifu-ken 09-4423; Japan
- Coordinates: 36.3271°N 137.1414°E
- Operator: JR Central
- Line: Takayama Main Line
- Distance: 166.6 km from Gifu
- Platforms: 1 side + 1 island platforms
- Tracks: 3

Other information
- Status: Unstaffed

History
- Opened: November 12, 1933
Location
- Location within Gifu Prefecture Location within Japan

Sakakami Station (坂上駅, Sakakami-eki) is a railway station on the Takayama Main Line in the city of Hida, Gifu Prefecture, Japan, operated by Central Japan Railway Company (JR Central).

== Lines ==
Sakakami Station is served by the JR Central Takayama Main Line, and is located 166.6 kilometers from the official starting point of the line at Gifu.

== Station layout ==
Sakakami Station has one ground-level side platform and one ground-level island platform connected by a footbridge. The station is unattended.

=== Platforms ===
1	■ Takayama Main Line	for Toyama
2, 3	■ Takayama Main Line	for Takayama and Gero

== Adjacent stations ==
«	Service	»
Takayama Main Line
Limited Express "Hida": Does not stop at this station
Tsunogawa	Local	Utsubo

== History ==
Sakakami Station opened on November 12, 1933. The station was absorbed into the JR Central network upon the privatization of the Japanese National Railways (JNR) on April 1, 1987.

== Surrounding area ==
- Former Miyazawa Village Hall

== See also ==
- List of railway stations in Japan
