= Hida-Hosoe Station =

Railway station in Hida, Gifu Prefecture, Japan

Hida-Hosoe Station 飛騨細江駅
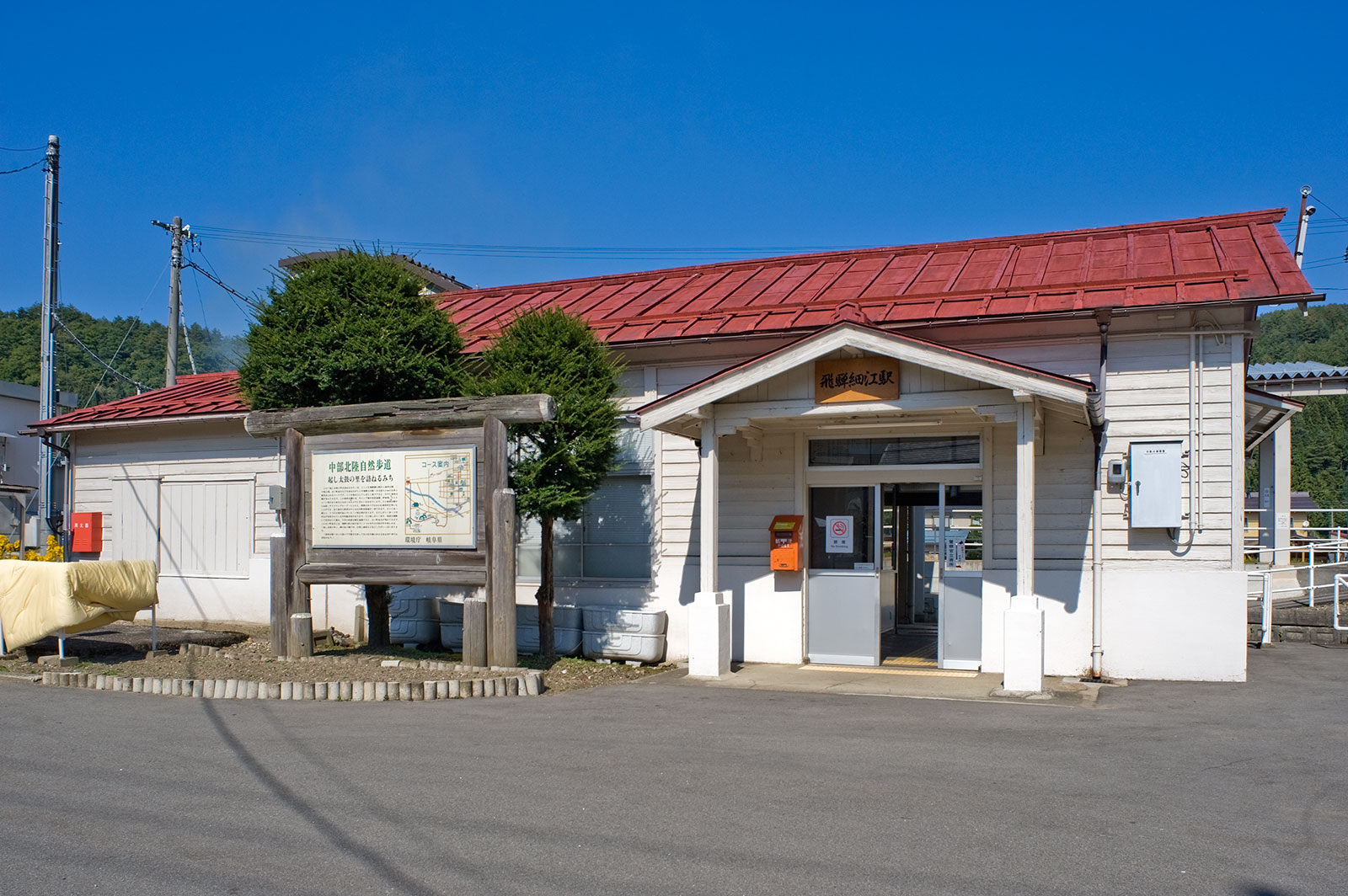
- Hida-Hosoe Station in October 2008

General information
- Location: Furukawa-cho Ukesamaru, Hida-shi, Gifu-ken 509-4203; Japan
- Coordinates: 36.2615°N 137.1454°E
- Operator: JR Central
- Line: Takayama Main Line
- Distance: 156.0 km from Gifu
- Platforms: 2 side platforms
- Tracks: 2

Other information
- Status: Unstaffed

History
- Opened: October 25, 1934
Location
- Location within Gifu Prefecture Location within Japan

Hida-Hosoe Station (飛騨細江駅, Hida-Hosoe-eki) is a railway station on the Takayama Main Line in the city of Hida, Gifu Prefecture, Japan, operated by Central Japan Railway Company (JR Central).

== Lines ==
Hida-Hosoe Station is served by the JR Central Takayama Main Line, and is located 156.0 kilometers from the official starting point of the line at Gifu.

== Station layout ==
Hida-Hosoe Station has two opposed ground-level side platforms connected by a footbridge. The station is unattended.

=== Platforms ===
1	■ Takayama Main Line	for Toyama
2	■ Takayama Main Line	for Takayama and Gero

== Adjacent stations ==
«	Service	»
Takayama Main Line
Limited Express "Hida": Does not stop at this station
Sugisaki	Local	Tsunogawa

== History ==
Hida-Hosoe Station opened on October 25, 1934. The station was absorbed into the JR Central network upon the privatization of Japanese National Railways (JNR) on April 1, 1987.

== Surrounding area ==
- National Route 41
- National Route 471

== See also ==
- List of railway stations in Japan
