= Hichisō =

Hichisō 七宗町
- Town
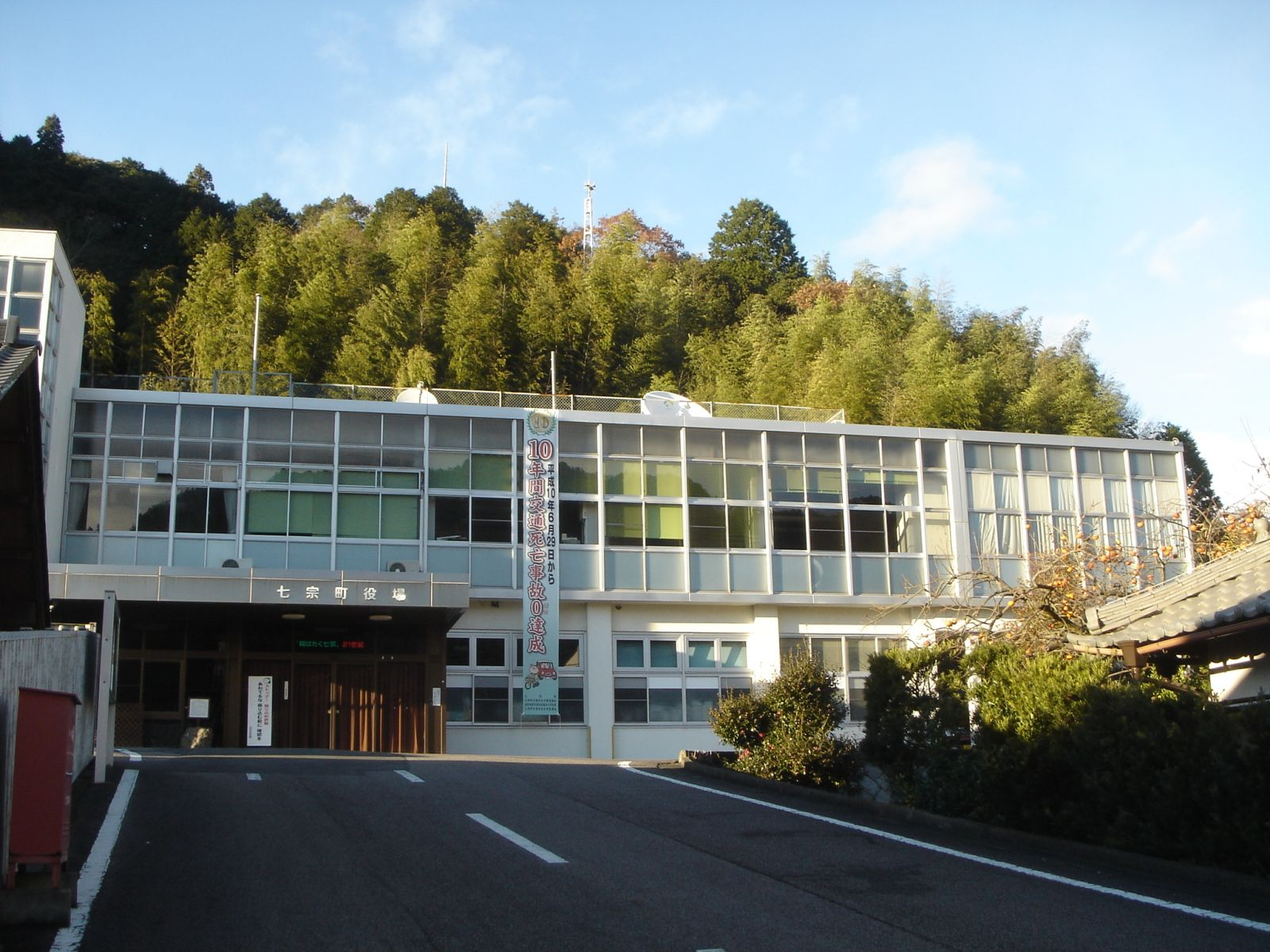
- Hichisō Town Hall

- Flag Seal

- Location of Hichisō in Gifu Prefecture

- Coordinates: 35°32′37.4″N 137°7′11.8″E
- Country: Japan
- Region: Chūbu
- Prefecture: Gifu
- District: Kamo

Area
  - Total: 40.4 km^{2} (15.6 sq mi)

Population (January 1, 2019)
  - Total: 3,801
  - Density: 94.1/km^{2} (244/sq mi)
- Time zone: UTC+9 (Japan Standard Time)
- City symbols
- Tree: Japanese cypress
- Flower: Rhododendron
- Phone number: 0574-48-1111
- Address: Kamiasō 2442-3, Hichisō-chō, Kamo-gun, Gifu-ken 509-0492
- Website: Official website

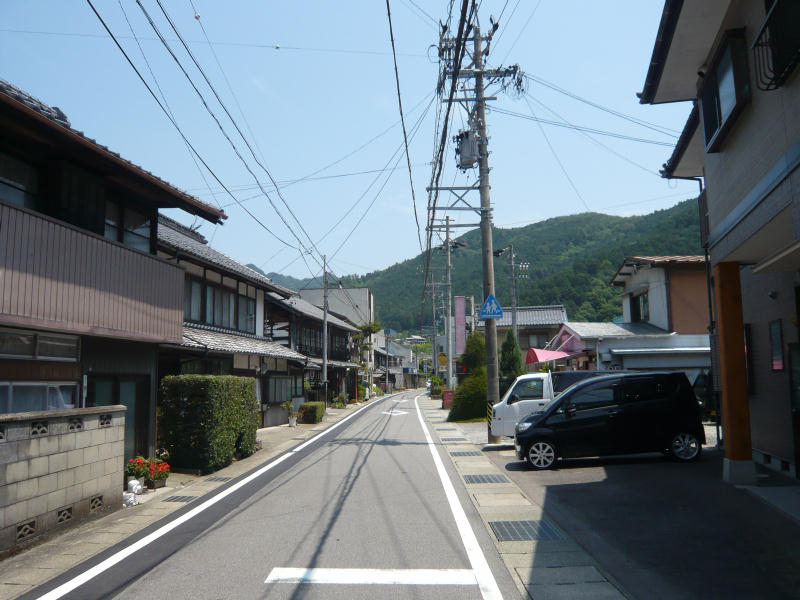
Kamiaso area in Hichisō

Hichisō (七宗町, Hichisō-chō) is a town located in Kamo District, Gifu, Japan. As of 1 January 2019, the town had an estimated population of 3,801 in and a population density of 94 persons per km^{2}, in 1437 households. The total area of the town was 7.91 square kilometres (3.05 sq mi).

== Geography ==
Hichisō is located in the Nōbi Plain of southern Gifu Prefecture, approximately 50 kilometers north of Nagoya metropolis. The Hida River flow through the town. The town has a climate characterized by characterized by hot and humid summers, and mild winters (Köppen climate classification Cfa). The average annual temperature in Hichisō is 14.4 °C. The average annual rainfall is 2153 mm with September as the wettest month. The temperatures are highest on average in August, at around 27.1 °C, and lowest in January, at around 2.4 °C.

=== Neighbouring municipalities ===
- Gifu Prefecture
  - Gero
  - Kawabe
  - Minokamo
  - Seki
  - Shirakawa
  - Yaotsu

== Demographics ==
Per Japanese census data, the population of Hichisō has declined at an accelerating rate over the past 50 years.

Historical population
Year	Pop.	±%
1970	6,688	—
1980	6,435	−3.8%
1990	6,097	−5.3%
2000	5,234	−14.2%
2010	4,484	−14.3%
2020	3,402	−24.1%

== History ==
The area around Hichisō was part of traditional Mino Province. During the Edo period, it was part of the territory controlled by Owari Domain. During the post-Meiji restoration cadastral reforms, the villages of Kabuchi and Kamiaso were created within Mugi District, Gifu with the establishment of the modern municipalities system on July 1, 1889. Kamiaso was transferred to Kamo District in 1952, followed by Kabuki in 1955. The two villages merged on February 11, 1955, to form the village of Hichisō. Hichisō was elevated to town status on April 1, 1971. Plans to merge with the neighbouring city of Minokamo were rejected by a referendum in December 2004.

== Economy ==
The mainstay of the local economy is agriculture.

== Education ==
Hichisō has two public elementary schools and two public middle schools operated by the town government. The town does not have a high school.

== Transportation ==
=== Railroad ===
- Central Japan Railway Company - Takayama Main Line
  - Kamiasō

=== Highway ===
- National Route 41
