= Fuchū-Usaka Station =

Railway station in Toyama, Toyama Prefecture, Japan

Fuchū-Usaka Station 婦中鵜坂駅
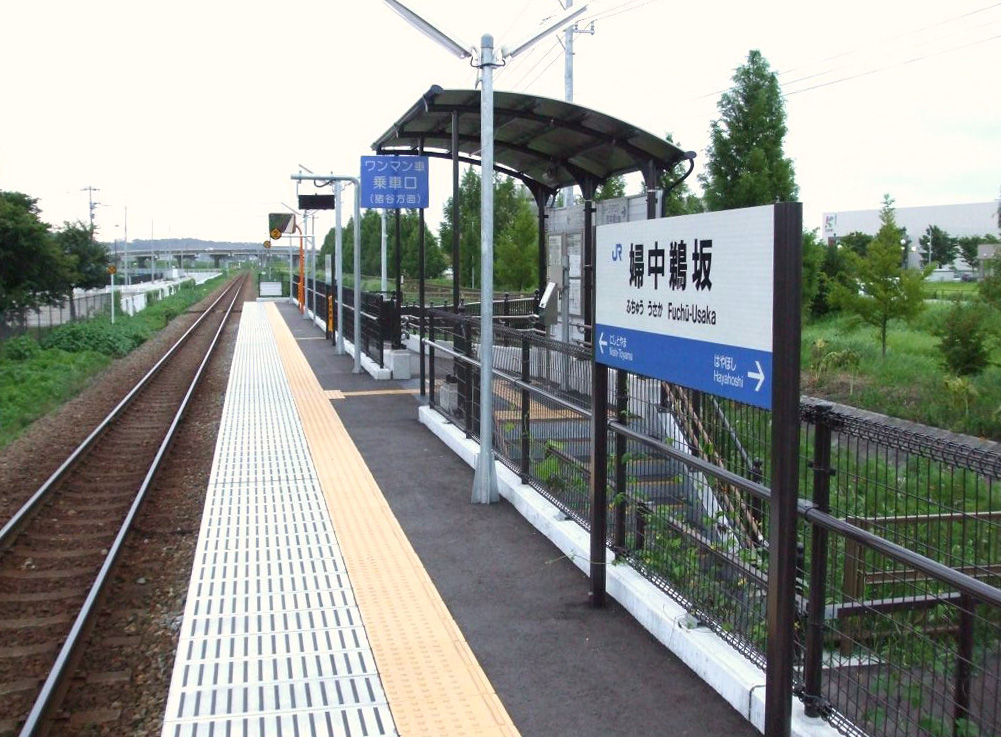
- View of the platform, August 2008

General information
- Location: 1162-3 Nishi-hongō, Fuchū-machi, Toyama-shi, Toyama-ken 939-2701; Japan
- Coordinates: 36.6646°N 137.1605°E
- Operator: JR West
- Line: ■ Takayama Main Line
- Distance: 219.6 km from Gifu
- Platforms: 1 side platform
- Tracks: 1

Construction
- Structure type: At grade

Other information
- Status: Unstaffed
- Website: Official website

History
- Opened: 15 March 2008

Passengers
- FY2015: 193 daily
Location
- Location within Japan

Fuchū-Usaka Station (婦中鵜坂駅, Fuchū-Usaka-eki) is a railway station on the Takayama Main Line in Toyama, Toyama, Japan, operated by the West Japan Railway Company (JR West).

== Lines ==
Fuchū-Usaka Station is served by the Takayama Main Line, and is located 219.6 kilometers from the end of the line at Gifu and 30.4 kilometers from the dividing point on the line between JR West and JR East at Inotani.

== Station layout ==
The station consists of one ground-level side platform serving a bidirectional single track. The station is unattended.

== Adjacent stations ==
«	Service	»
Takayama Main Line
Limited Express "Hida": Does not stop at this station
Hayahoshi	Local	Nishi-Toyama

== History ==
The station opened on 15 March 2008.

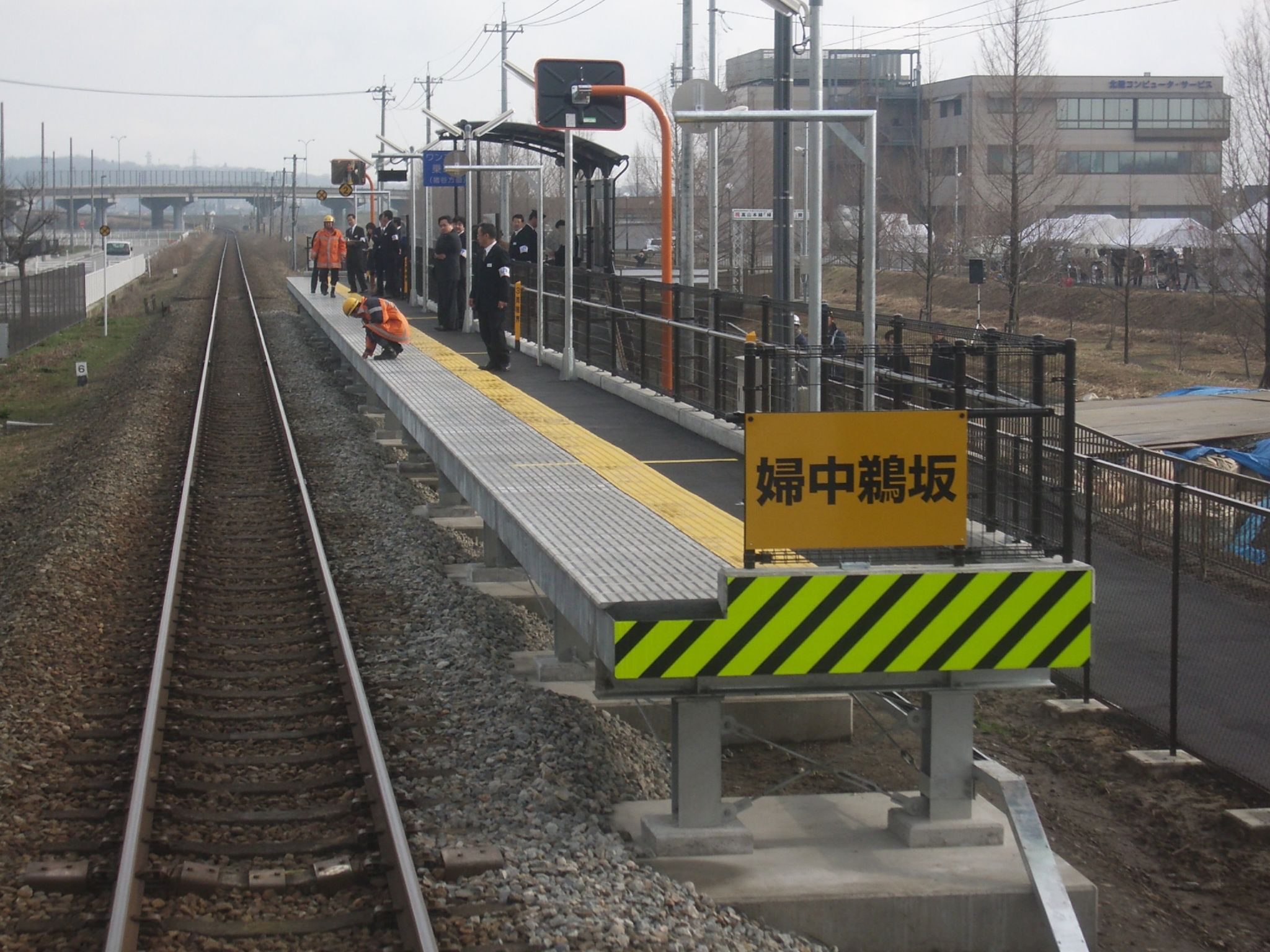
Fuchū-Usaka Station on the day of opening, 15 March 2008

== Passenger statistics ==
In fiscal 2015, the station was used by an average of 193 passengers daily (boarding passengers only).

== See also ==
- List of railway stations in Japan
