= Takayama Main Line =

Railway line in Japan

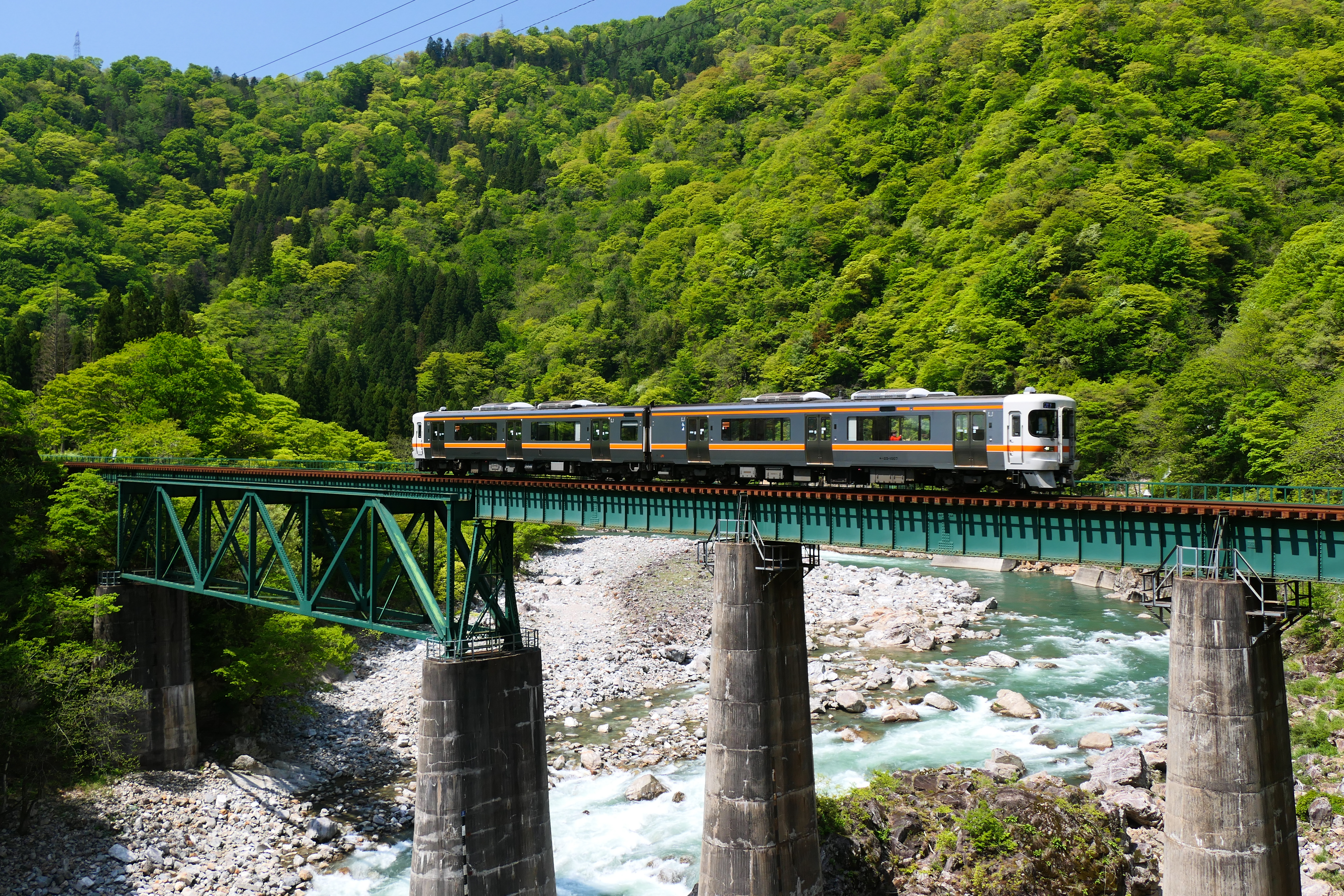
- Local train running on the Takayama Main Line in May 2022

Overview
- Native name: 高山本線
- Status: Operational
- Owner: JR Central, JR West
- Locale: Japan
- Termini: Gifu; Toyama
- Stations: 45

Service
- Type: Heavy rail
- Operator(s): JR Central, JR West
- Rolling stock: See section

History
- Opened: 1920; 106 years ago
- Last extension: 25 October 1934

Technical
- Line length: 225.8 km (140.3 mi)
- Number of tracks: Entire line single tracked
- Character: Rural
- Track gauge: 1,067 mm (3 ft 6 in)
- Electrification: Not electrified
- Operating speed: 110 km/h (68 mph)
Route map
Line map

The Takayama Main Line (高山本線, Takayama Honsen) is a Japanese railway line between Gifu Station in Gifu and Toyama Station in Toyama, operated by Central Japan Railway Company (JR Central) and West Japan Railway Company (JR West). The line directly links the Chūkyō Metropolitan Area (metropolitan Nagoya) and Hokuriku region in a shorter distance, but with a longer travel time, than by using the combination of the Tōkaidō Shinkansen and Hokuriku Main Line. Now the line primarily functions as a way to access the scenic areas of Hida (ancient Hida Province), in the rugged mountains of northern Gifu Prefecture, such as Gero onsen (hot spring), Takayama, Shirakawa-gō, and the Kiso River. The first section of the line, between Gifu and Kagamigahara, opened in 1920. The whole line was completed in 1934.

== History ==
The route to Mino-Ōta Station was initially planned to connect directly to Nagoya Station, influenced by Rikken Seiyūkai. However, the Kenseikai pressured the Railway Construction Committee of the House of Representatives to revise the route through Gifu Station. After this change, the Kenseikai, supporting the revised route, clashed with the Rikken Seiyūkai, who now proposed for a route through Seki. The Mino Electric Railroad then planned constructing a line connecting Seki and Ōta. The route favored by the Kenseikai was adopted, passing the House of Representatives on February 9, 1918, and the House of Peers on March 1.

Until the line's completion, the line terminating at Gifu Station and the line terminating at Toyama Station were referred to as separate railway lines. The former was named Takayama Line while the latter was named Hietsu Line. The Takayama Line's first section between Gifu and Kakamigahara opened on November 1, 1920. The Takayama Line opened in phases, with the line gradually extending to Mino-Ōta, Shimoasō, Kamiasō, Shirakawaguchi, Hida-Kanayama, Yakeishi, Gero, and Hida-Hagiwara between 1921 and 1931. The last section of the line to Hida-Osaka opened on August 25, 1933. Hietsu Line also began extending south from Toyama Station, with the section to Etchū-Yatsuo opening on September 1, 1927. The construction southwards continued, with the line reaching Sasazu in 1929, Inotani in 1930, Sugihara in 1932, and Sakakami on November 12, 1933. The Takayama Line and Hietsu Line were connected on October 25, 1934. Hietsu Line was merged into Takayama Line, which renamed to Takayama Main Line on the same date.

As a part of a social experiment, the city of Toyama opened the Fuchū-Usaka Station as a temporary station on March 15, 2008. The station continued operations after the experiment ended in 2011, as the city determined that the station had enough riders to be feasible as a permanent station. The station was officially made permanent on March 15, 2014.

The line introduced station numbering and line coloring in March 2018; the line was assigned the color dark red and line code CG. Most stations north of Mino-Ōta does not have a station number assigned, with an exception of Gero, Takayama, and Hida-Furukawa. The station numbering for these three stations still count the number of stations in between them.

=== Damages by natural disasters and recoveries ===
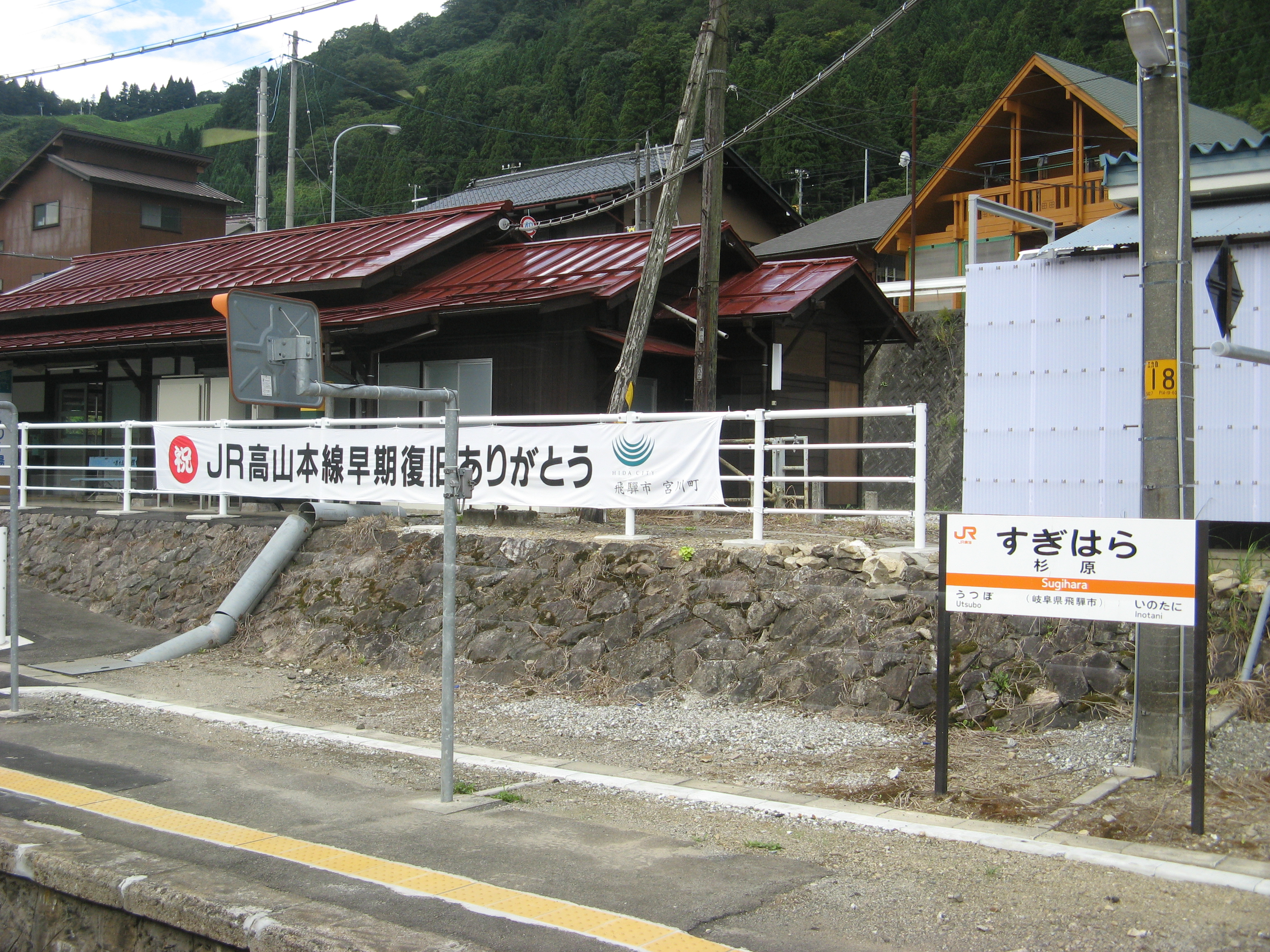
Banner in Sugihara Station after the services in the line resumed in 2007

Operation on the line has been suspended several times in history, due to heavy rain and typhoons. From October 22, 2004, the section between Tsunogawa Station and Inotani Station was closed due to flood damage from Typhoon Tokage. The line returned to service in sections, with the last section reopening on September 8, 2007. Heavy rain which have caused the 2018 Japan floods triggered a landslide on June 29, leading to the closure of the section between Hida-Hagiwara and Hida-Osaka. This closure spread further due to dirt entering tracks, with the section between Mino-Ōta and Toyama affected by July 8. While most of the line reopened over the next week, the section between Sakakami and Inotani did not reopen until November 21.

== Services and operation ==
The Hida limited express train operates between Nagoya and Takayama, Hida-Furukawa, and Toyama, with ten return services a day, and trains to and from Nagoya reversing direction at Gifu en route.

All trains, except for Hida services, stop at all stations. Local trains are sometimes one-man operated. Some trains provide through service to Tajimi Station via the Taita Line. For the section operated by JR Central, the number of train services on the line decreases as it goes closer to the Inotani Station, as most local trains terminate at Mino-Ōta, or continues to Taita Line. Trains on the section operated by JR West also terminate at Etchū-Yatsuo or Inotani.

== Infrastructure ==
=== Rolling stock ===
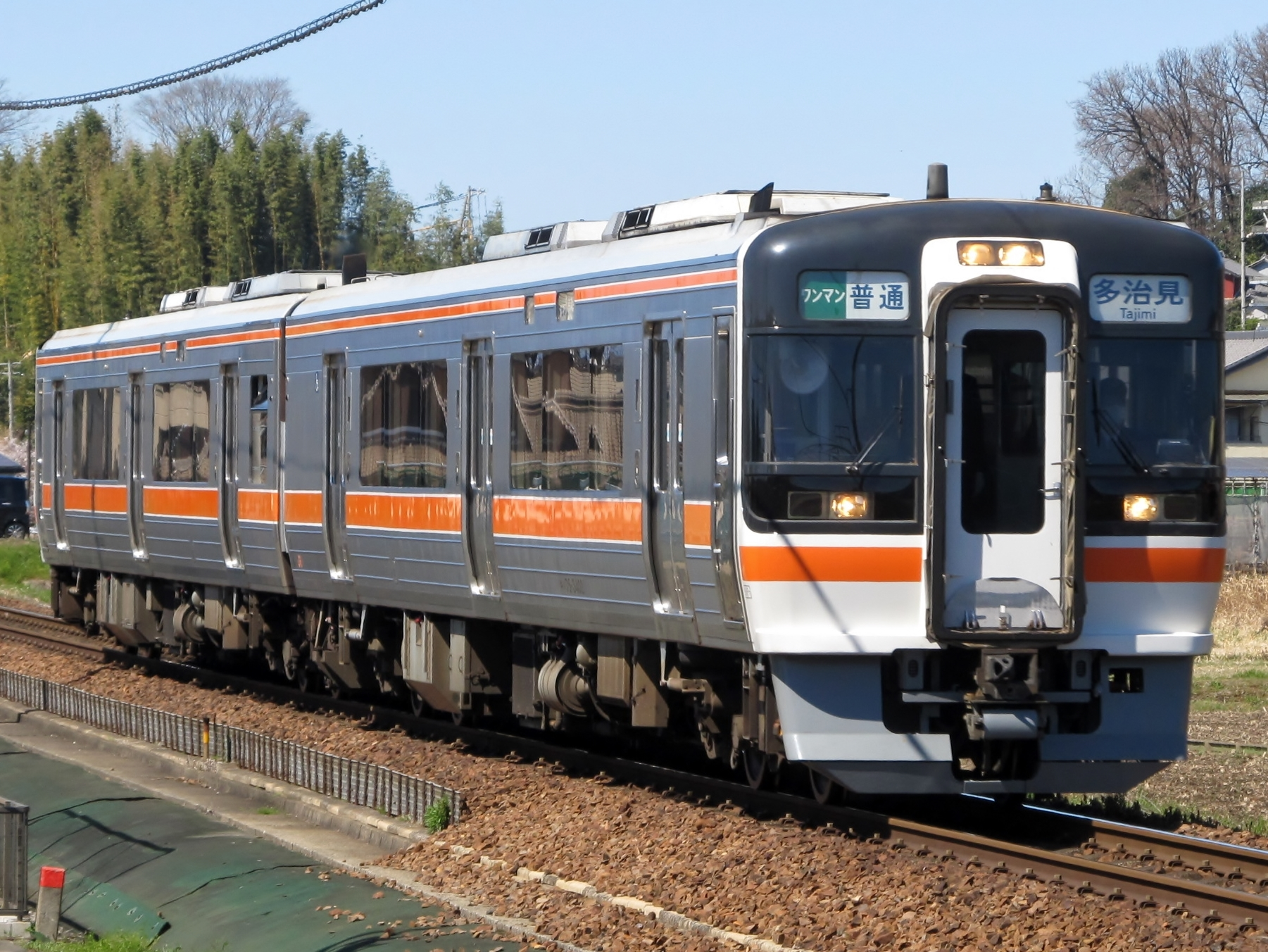
KiHa 75 series DMU heading for Tajimi

The Takayama Main Line uses four different diesel multiple unit (DMU) trains that are operated in split two-car sets. JR Central uses KiHa 25 and KiHa 75 series DMU on the section they operate. From the start of the March 2015 timetable revision, JR Central KiHa 25 series diesel multiple unit (DMU) trains displaced from the Taketoyo Line were phased in on Takayama Line services, with the last remaining KiHa 40 series DMU trains withdrawn from the line on 30 June 2015. JR West uses KiHa 120 DMU trains on the section they operate. The HC85 series trains are used for the limited express Hida services.

=== Stations list ===
| No. | Station | | Distance | Transfers | Location | |
JR Central
| CG00 | Gifu | 岐阜 | 0.0 | Tōkaidō Main Line; Meitetsu: (at Meitetsu Gifu); ■ Meitetsu Kakamigahara Line; ■ Meitetsu Nagoya Line | Gifu | Gifu |
| CG01 | Nagamori | 長森 | 4.2 | | Gifu | Gifu |
| CG02 | Naka | 那加 | 7.2 | | Kakamigahara | Gifu |
| CG03 | Sohara | 蘇原 | 10.4 | | Kakamigahara | Gifu |
| CG04 | Kagamigahara | 各務ヶ原 | 13.2 | | Kakamigahara | Gifu |
| CG05 | Unuma | 鵜沼 | 17.3 | Meitetsu: (at Shin-Unuma); ■ Meitetsu Inuyama Line; ■ Meitetsu Kakamigahara Line | Kakamigahara | Gifu |
| CG06 | Sakahogi | 坂祝 | 22.5 | | Sakahogi, Kamo | Gifu |
| CG07 | Mino-Ōta | 美濃太田 | 27.3 | Taita Line; ■ Nagaragawa Railway Etsumi-Nan Line | Minokamo | Gifu |
| | Kobi | 古井 | 30.3 | | Minokamo | Gifu |
| | Nakakawabe | 中川辺 | 34.1 | | Kawabe, Kamo | Gifu |
| | Shimoasō | 下麻生 | 37.9 | | Kawabe, Kamo | Gifu |
| | Kamiasō | 上麻生 | 43.2 | | Hichisō, Kamo | Gifu |
| | Shirakawaguchi | 白川口 | 53.1 | | Shirakawa, Kamo | Gifu |
| | Shimoyui | 下油井 | 61.7 | | Shirakawa, Kamo | Gifu |
| | Hida-Kanayama | 飛驒金山 | 66.7 | | Gero | Gifu |
| | Yakeishi | 焼石 | 75.7 | | Gero | Gifu |
| CG16 | Gero | 下呂 | 88.3 | | Gero | Gifu |
| | Zenshōji | 禅昌寺 | 93.5 | | Gero | Gifu |
| | Hida-Hagiwara | 飛驒萩原 | 96.7 | | Gero | Gifu |
| | Jōro | 上呂 | 100.8 | | Gero | Gifu |
| | Hida-Miyada | 飛驒宮田 | 105.4 | | Gero | Gifu |
| | Hida-Osaka | 飛驒小坂 | 108.8 | | Gero | Gifu |
| | Nagisa | 渚 | 115.9 | | Takayama | Gifu |
| | Kuguno | 久々野 | 123.2 | | Takayama | Gifu |
| | Hida-Ichinomiya | 飛驒一ノ宮 | 129.5 | | Takayama | Gifu |
| CG25 | Takayama | 高山 | 136.4 | | Takayama | Gifu |
| | Hozue | 上枝 | 141.0 | | Takayama | Gifu |
| | Hida-Kokufu | 飛驒国府 | 147.6 | | Takayama | Gifu |
| CG28 | Hida-Furukawa | 飛驒古川 | 151.3 | | Hida | Gifu |
| | Sugisaki | 杉崎 | 153.6 | | Hida | Gifu |
| | Hida-Hosoe | 飛驒細江 | 156.0 | | Hida | Gifu |
| | Tsunogawa | 角川 | 161.7 | | Hida | Gifu |
| | Sakakami | 坂上 | 166.6 | | Hida | Gifu |
| | Utsubo | 打保 | 176.5 | | Hida | Gifu |
| | Sugihara | 杉原 | 180.5 | | Hida | Gifu |
| | Inotani | 猪谷 | 189.2 | | Toyama | Toyama |
JR West
| | Inotani | 猪谷 | 189.2 | | Toyama | Toyama |
| | Nirehara | 楡原 | 196.2 | | Toyama | Toyama |
| | Sasazu | 笹津 | 200.5 | | Toyama | Toyama |
| | Higashi-Yatsuo | 東八尾 | 205.0 | | Toyama | Toyama |
| | Etchū-Yatsuo | 越中八尾 | 208.7 | | Toyama | Toyama |
| | Chisato | 千里 | 213.6 | | Toyama | Toyama |
| | Hayahoshi | 速星 | 217.9 | | Toyama | Toyama |
| | Fuchū-Usaka | 婦中鵜坂 | 219.6 | | Toyama | Toyama |
| | Nishi-Toyama | 西富山 | 222.2 | | Toyama | Toyama |
| | Toyama | 富山 | 225.8 | Hokuriku Shinkansen; Ainokaze Toyama Railway Line; ■ Toyama Chiho Railway Main Line; ■ Toyama Chiho Railway Tateyama Line; ■ Toyama Chiho Railway Fujikoshi Line; ■ Toyama City Tram Lines; ■ Toyama Light Rail Toyamako Line | Toyama | Toyama |

== See also ==
- List of railway lines in Japan
