= Yakeishi Station =

Railway station in Gero, Gifu Prefecture, Japan

Yakeishi Station 焼石駅
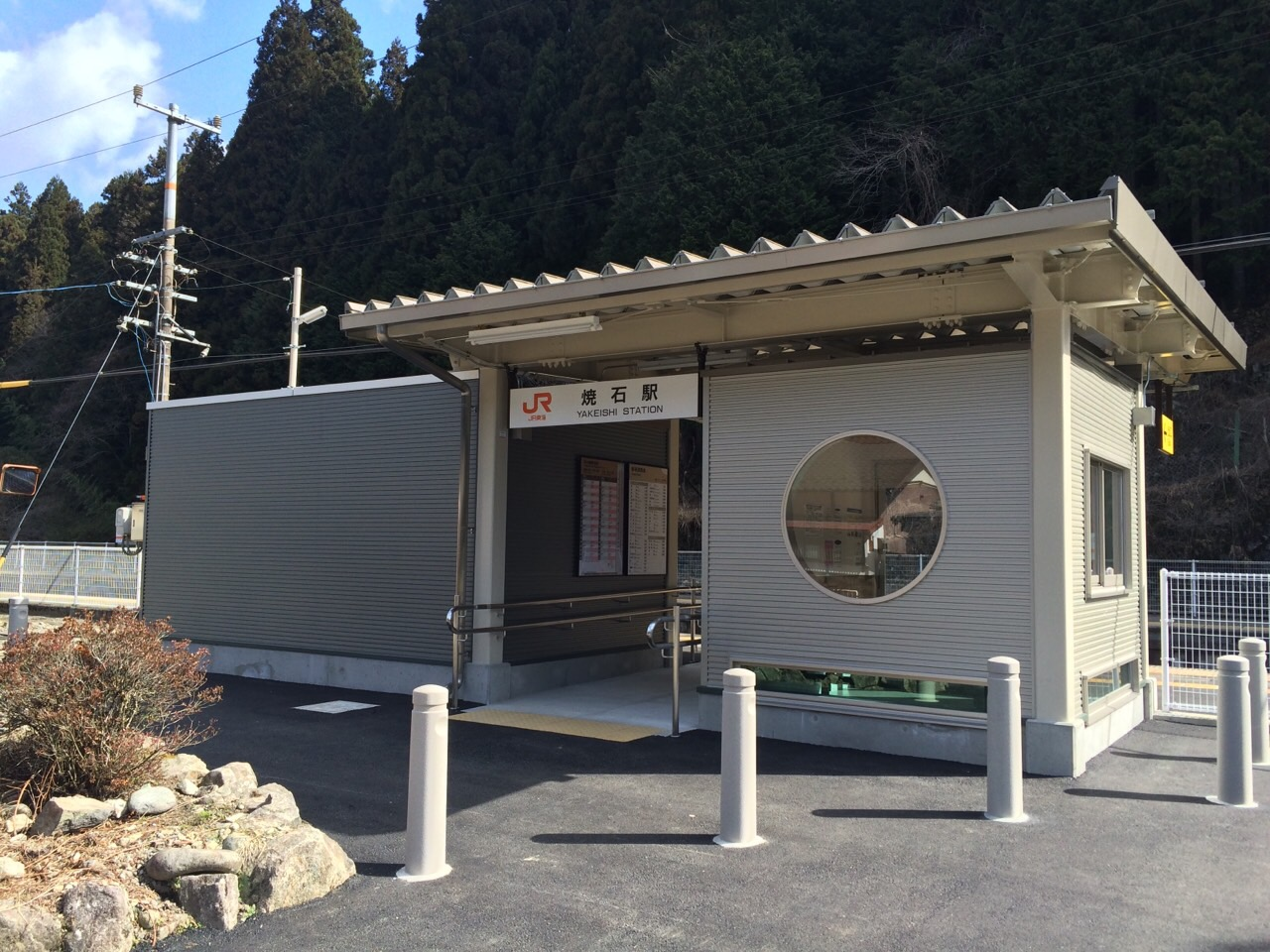
- Yakeishi Station in March 2015

General information
- Location: 2828 Yakeishi, Gero-shi, Gifu-ken 509-1614; Japan
- Coordinates: 35.7258°N 137.2009°E
- Operator: JR Central
- Line: Takayama Main Line
- Distance: 75.7 km from Gifu
- Platforms: 2 side platforms
- Tracks: 2

Other information
- Status: Unstaffed

History
- Opened: April 14, 1929; 97 years ago
Location
- Location within Gifu Prefecture Location within Japan

Yakeishi Station (焼石駅, Yakeishi-eki) is a railway station on the Takayama Main Line in the city of Gero, Gifu Prefecture, Japan, operated by Central Japan Railway Company (JR Central).

== Lines ==
Yakeishi Station is served by the JR Central Takayama Main Line, and is located 75.7 kilometers from the official starting point of the line at Gifu.

== Station layout ==
Yakeishi Station has two opposed ground-level side platforms connected by a footbridge. The station is unattended.

=== Platforms ===
1	■ Takayama Main Line	for Gero and Takayama
2	■ Takayama Main Line	for Mino-Ōta and Gifu

== Adjacent stations ==
«	Service	»
Takayama Main Line
Limited Express "Hida": Does not stop at this station
Hida-Kanayama	Local	Gero

== History ==
Yakeishi Station opened on April 14, 1929. The station was absorbed into the JR Central network upon the privatization of Japanese National Railways (JNR) on April 1, 1987. A new station building was completed on March 19, 2015.

== Surrounding area ==
- National Route 41
- Hida River
- Shimohara Dam

== See also ==
- List of railway stations in Japan
