= Kagamigahara Station =

Railway station in Kakamigahara, Gifu Prefecture, Japan

CG04 Kagamigahara Station 各務ヶ原駅
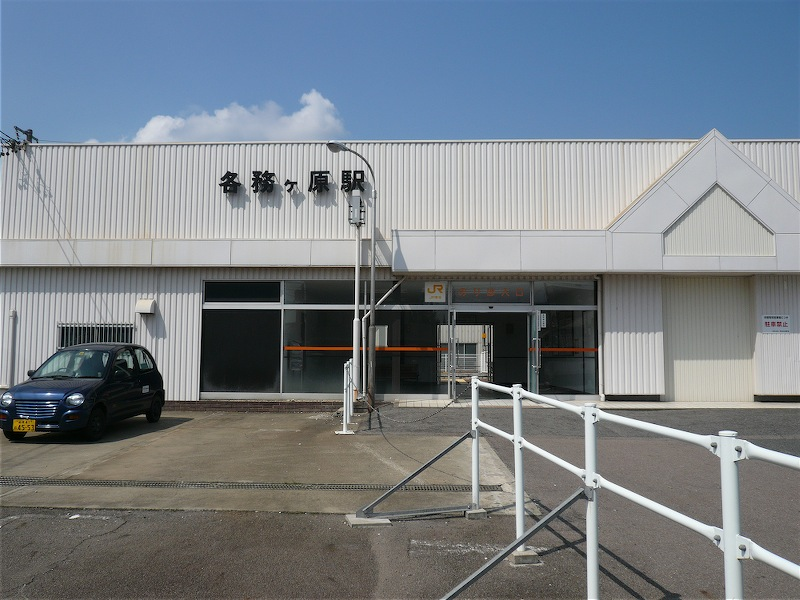
- Kagamigahara Station in September 2007

General information
- Location: 1-243 Unuma Kakaigahara-cho, Kakamigahara-shi, Gifu-ken 509-0141; Japan
- Coordinates: 35.4038°N 136.9011°E
- Operator: JR Central
- Line: Takayama Main Line
- Distance: 13.2 km from Gifu
- Platforms: 2 side platforms
- Tracks: 2

Other information
- Status: Unstaffed
- Station code: CG04

History
- Opened: November 1, 1920; 105 years ago

Passengers
- FY2015: 434 daily
Location
- Location within Gifu Prefecture Location within Japan

Kagamigahara Station (各務ヶ原駅, Kagamigahara-eki) is a railway station on the Takayama Main Line in the city of Kakamigahara, Gifu Prefecture, Japan, operated by Central Japan Railway Company (JR Central).

== Lines ==
Kagamigahara Station is served by the JR Central Takayama Main Line, and is located 13.2 kilometers from the official starting point of the line at Gifu.

== Station layout ==
Kagamigahara Station has two opposed ground-level side platforms connected by a footbridge. The station is unattended.

=== Platforms ===
1	■ Takayama Main Line	for Gifu and Nagoya
2	■ Takayama Main Line	for Mino-Ōta and Takayama

== Adjacent stations ==
«	Service	»
Takayama Main Line
Limited Express "Hida": Does not stop at this station
Sohara	Local	Unuma

== History ==
Kagamigahara Station opened on November 1, 1920. The station was absorbed into the JR Central network upon the privatization of Japanese National Railways (JNR) on April 1, 1987.

== Passenger statistics ==
In fiscal 2015, the station was used by an average of 434 passengers daily (boarding passengers only).

== Surrounding area ==
- National Route 21

== See also ==
- List of railway stations in Japan
