= Hida-Kanayama Station =

Railway station in Gero, Gifu Prefecture, Japan

Hida-Kanayama Station 飛騨金山駅
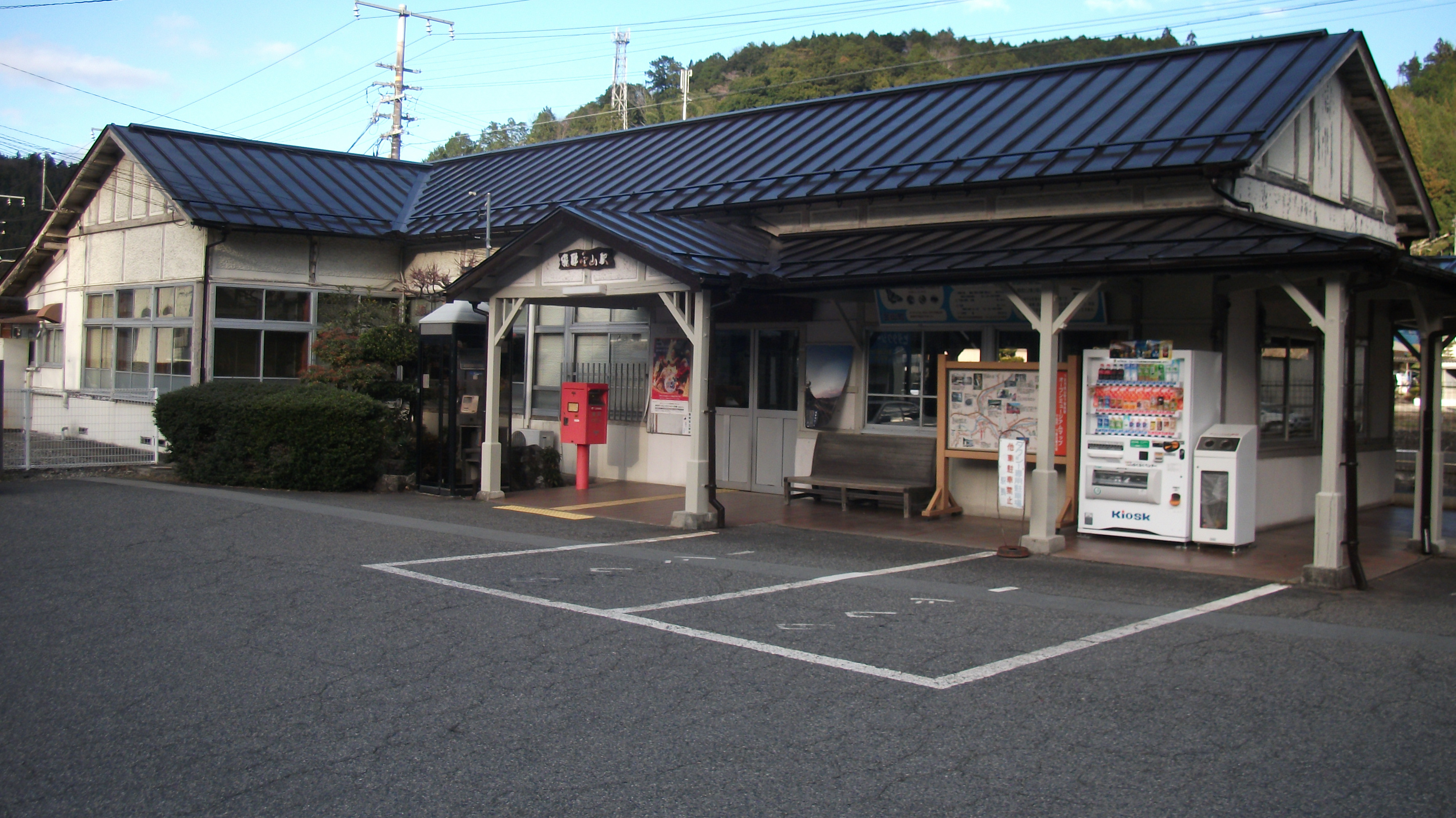
- Hida-Kanayama Station in December 2011

General information
- Location: Kanayama-cho Ofunato, Gero-shi, Gifu-ken 509-1614; Japan
- Coordinates: 35.6625°N 137.1641°E
- Operator: JR Central
- Line: Takayama Main Line
- Distance: 66.7 km from Gifu
- Platforms: 1 island + 1 side platform
- Tracks: 3

Other information
- Status: Staffed

History
- Opened: March 21, 1928; 98 years ago

Passengers
- FY2016: 209 daily
Location
- Location within Gifu Prefecture Location within Japan

Hida-Kanayama Station (飛騨金山駅, Hida-Kanayama-eki) is a railway station on the Takayama Main Line in the city of Gero, Gifu Prefecture, Japan, operated by Central Japan Railway Company (JR Central).

== Lines ==
Hida-Kanayama Station is served by the JR Central Takayama Main Line, and is located 66.7 kilometers from the official starting point of the line at Gifu.

== Station layout ==
Hida-Kanayama Station has one ground-level island platform and one ground-level side platform connected by a footbridge. The station is staffed.

=== Platforms ===
1	■ Takayama Main Line	for Gero and Takayama
2, 3	■ Takayama Main Line	for Mino-Ōta and Gifu

== Adjacent stations ==
«	Service	»
Takayama Main Line
Shimoyui	Local	Yakeishi
Shirakawaguchi or Mino-Ōta	Limited Express Hida	Gero

== History ==
Hida-Kanayama Station opened on March 21, 1928. The station was absorbed into the JR Central network upon the privatization of Japanese National Railways (JNR) on April 1, 1987.

== Passenger statistics ==
In fiscal 2016, the station was used by an average of 209 passengers daily (boarding passengers only).

== Surrounding area ==
- National Route 41

== See also ==
- List of railway stations in Japan
