= Hida (train) =

Japanese limited express train service

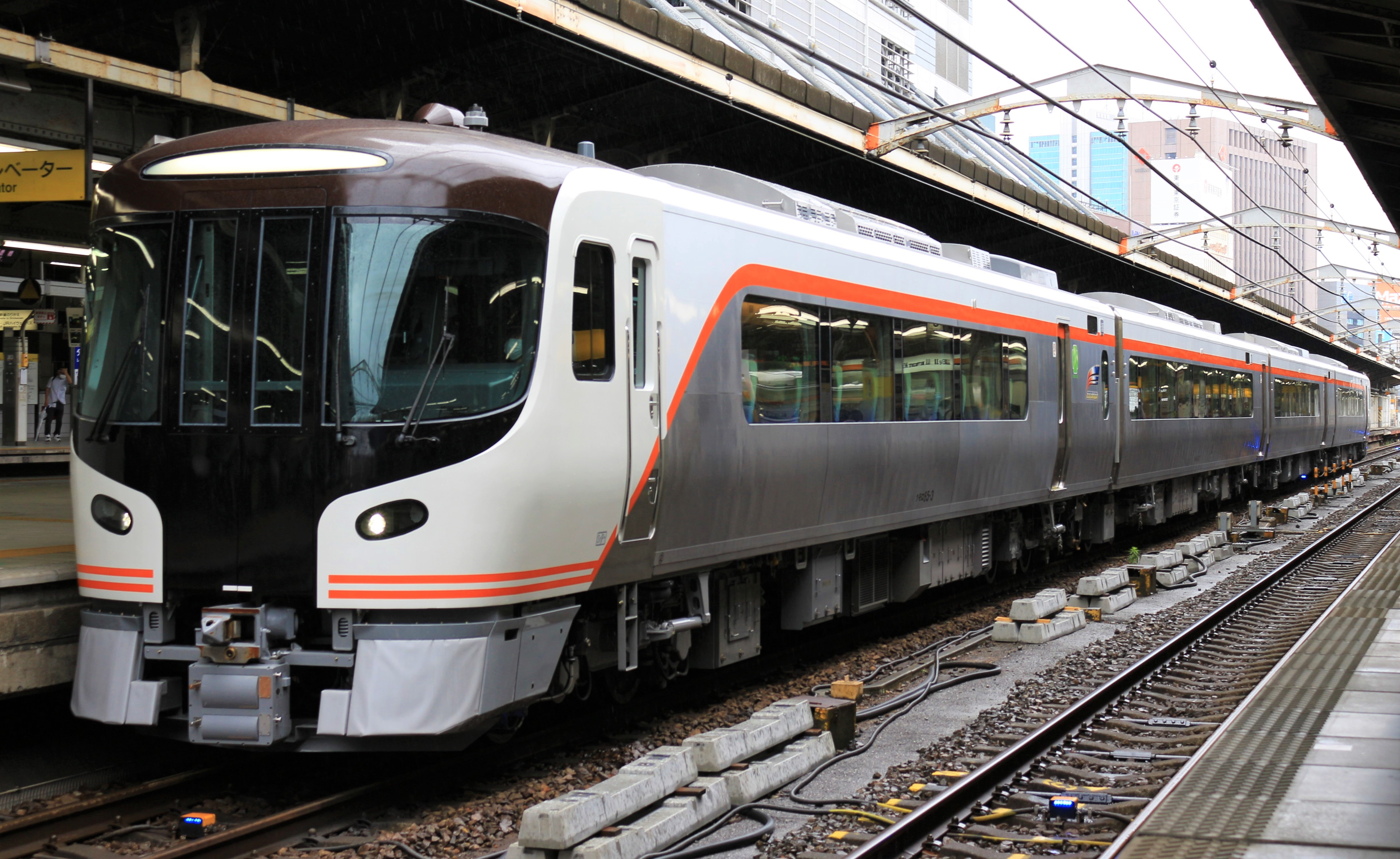
- A JR Central HC85 series DEMU on a Hida service.

Overview
- Service type: Limited express
- Status: Operational
- First service: 1 March 1958
- Current operator: JR Central
- Former operator: JNR

Route
- Termini: Nagoya, Ōsaka; Takayama, Hida-Furukawa, Toyama
- Stops: 23
- Distance travelled: 166.7 km (103.6 mi) (Nagoya - Takayama); 181.6 km (112.8 mi) (Nagoya - Hida-Furukawa); 256.1 km (159.1 mi) (Nagoya - Toyama); 296.5 km (184.2 mi) (Ōsaka - Takayama)
- Average journey time: 2 hours 30 minutes (Nagoya - Takayama); 4 hours (Nagoya - Toyama); 4 hours 15 minutes (Ōsaka - Takayama)
- Service frequency: 10 return workings daily
- Lines used: Tōkaidō Main Line, Takayama Main Line

On-board services
- Classes: Standard (reserved & non-reserved) + Green
- Disabled access: Yes
- Sleeping arrangements: None
- Catering facilities: None
- Observation facilities: None
- Entertainment facilities: None
- Other facilities: Toilets, WiFi

Technical
- Rolling stock: HC85 series DEMU
- Electrification: None
- Operating speed: 120 km/h (75 mph)
- Track owners: JR Central, JR West

The Hida (ひだ, Hida) is a limited express train service operated by Central Japan Railway Company (JR Central) along the Takayama Main Line in central Japan since 1958, which connects Nagoya and Takayama in 2 hours 30 minutes, Nagoya and Toyama in 4 hours, and Ōsaka and Takayama in 4 hours 15 minutes. The Hida serves various locations en route such as Gifu and Gero. Like all JR limited express trains, a limited express fare ticket, along with a standard basic fare ticket, must be purchased in order to ride this service.

== Overview ==
Five round trips operate daily from Nagoya to Takayama includes one service originating from Ōsaka and continuing on to Gifu before coupling with a Hida service from Nagoya and continuing to the terminus of Takayama. And five more continue past Takayama to Hida-Furukawa and Toyama. Trains operate at a maximum speed of 120 km/h (75 mph).

=== Stations ===
Stations in brackets () are stations where not all Hida services stop.

Nagoya – (Owari-Ichinomiya) – Gifu – (Unuma) – Mino-Ota – (Shirakawaguchi) – (Hida-Kanayama) – Gero – (Hida-Hagiwara) – (Hida-Osaka) – (Kuguno) – Takayama

Some services continue to Toyama: Hida-Furukawa – Inotani – Etchu-Yatsuo – (Hayahoshi) – Toyama

Ōsaka service: Ōsaka – Shin-Ōsaka – Kyoto – Kusatsu – Maibara – Ogaki – Gifu (Couple with service from Nagoya) - Mino-Ota – Gero – Takayama

Services to and from Nagoya Station require a switchback at Gifu Station.

The section of the route between Inotani to Toyama and Ōsaka to Maibara is operated by JR West.

== Facilities ==
=== Accommodation ===
Standard class (including reserved seats and non-reserved seats) and Green class is available on this service, although not all services carry a Green car. Seat reservations can be made for an extra fee. Both standard and Green classes feature comfortable seats.

=== Utilities ===
There are universal access toilets onboard this service. There are also wheelchair spaces. Onboard catering services ceased on 16 March 2013. Complimentary WiFi is also available.

== Scenery ==
The Takayama Main Line, on which the Hida runs for a majority of its journey, offers scenic views of rural Japan. Several rivers, valleys, mountains, and other natural landforms can be seen throughout the journey.

== History ==
The Hida train service was inaugurated in 1956, as part of efforts to improve transportation in rural areas and promote tourism in the Hida region. Initially operated by the Japanese National Railways (JNR), the service became part of JR Central following the privatization of the railways in 1987.

After Typhoon Tokage in 2004, the track suffered major damage from flooding. As a result, instead of going all the way to Toyama Station, trains could only go as far as Hida-Furukawa Station until 8 September 2007, when the track was repaired and again reached all the way to Toyama Station.

== Rolling stock ==
=== Current rolling stock ===
HC85 series diesel-electric multiple unit (DEMU) hybrid trains were used on Hida services from 1 July 2022. Since JR Central's 18 March 2023 timetable revision, all Hida services have been operated using HC85 series trains.

=== Past rolling stock ===
KiHa 80 series DMUs were used from the start of operation in 1958 until 1990.

KiHa 85 series trains were used from 1989 until 2023, usually operating as 3-, 4-, 6-, 7-, or 8-car formations, or occasionally 10-car formations, especially during busy seasons.

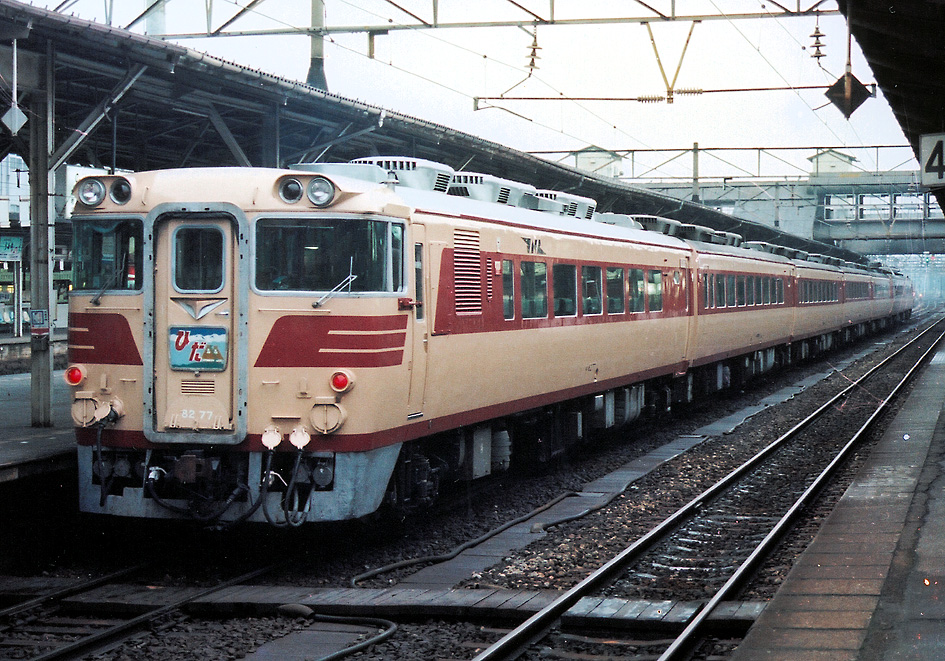
KiHa 80 series

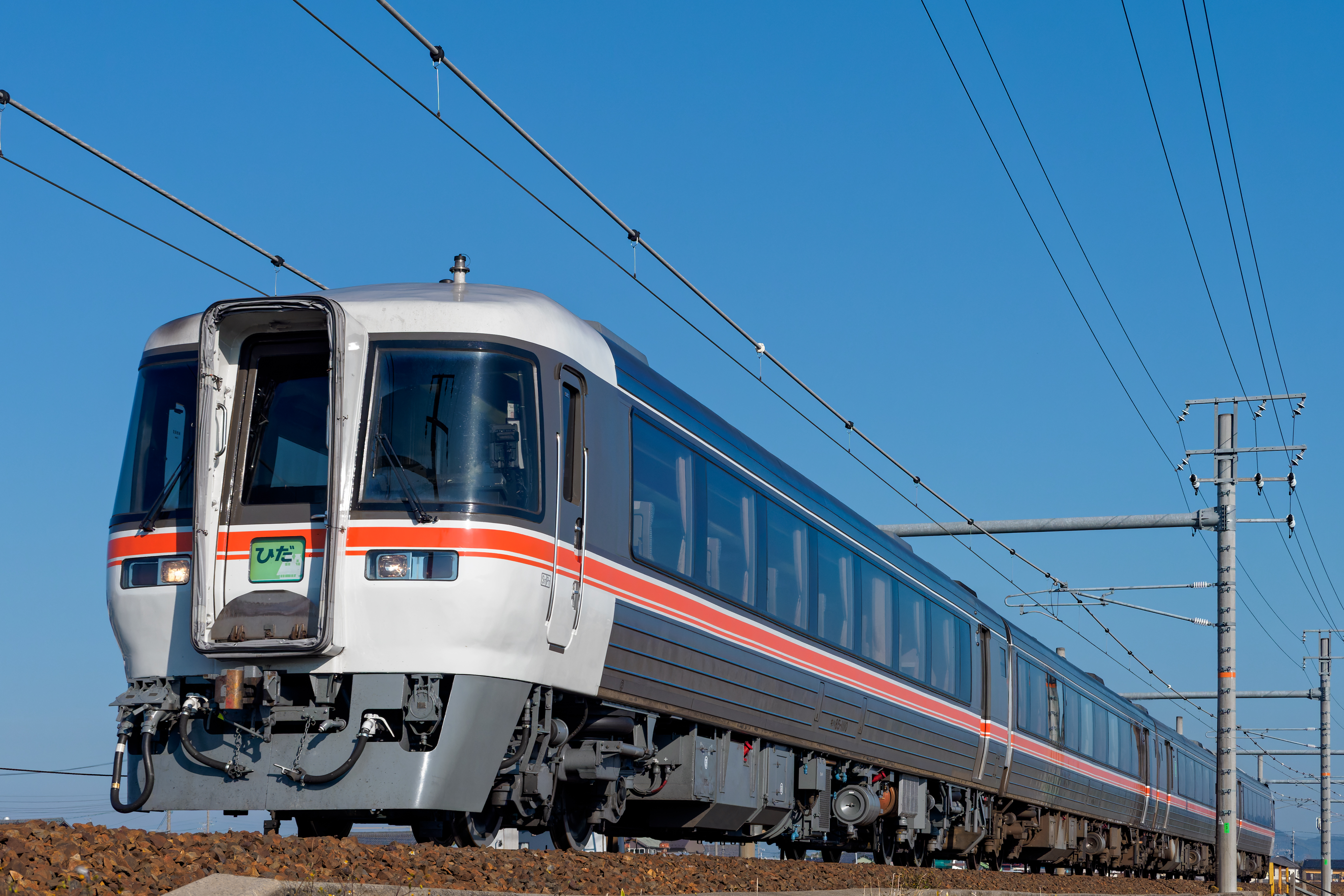
KiHa 85 series
