= Unuma Station =

Railway station in Kakamigahara, Gifu Prefecture, Japan

CG05 Unuma Station 鵜沼駅
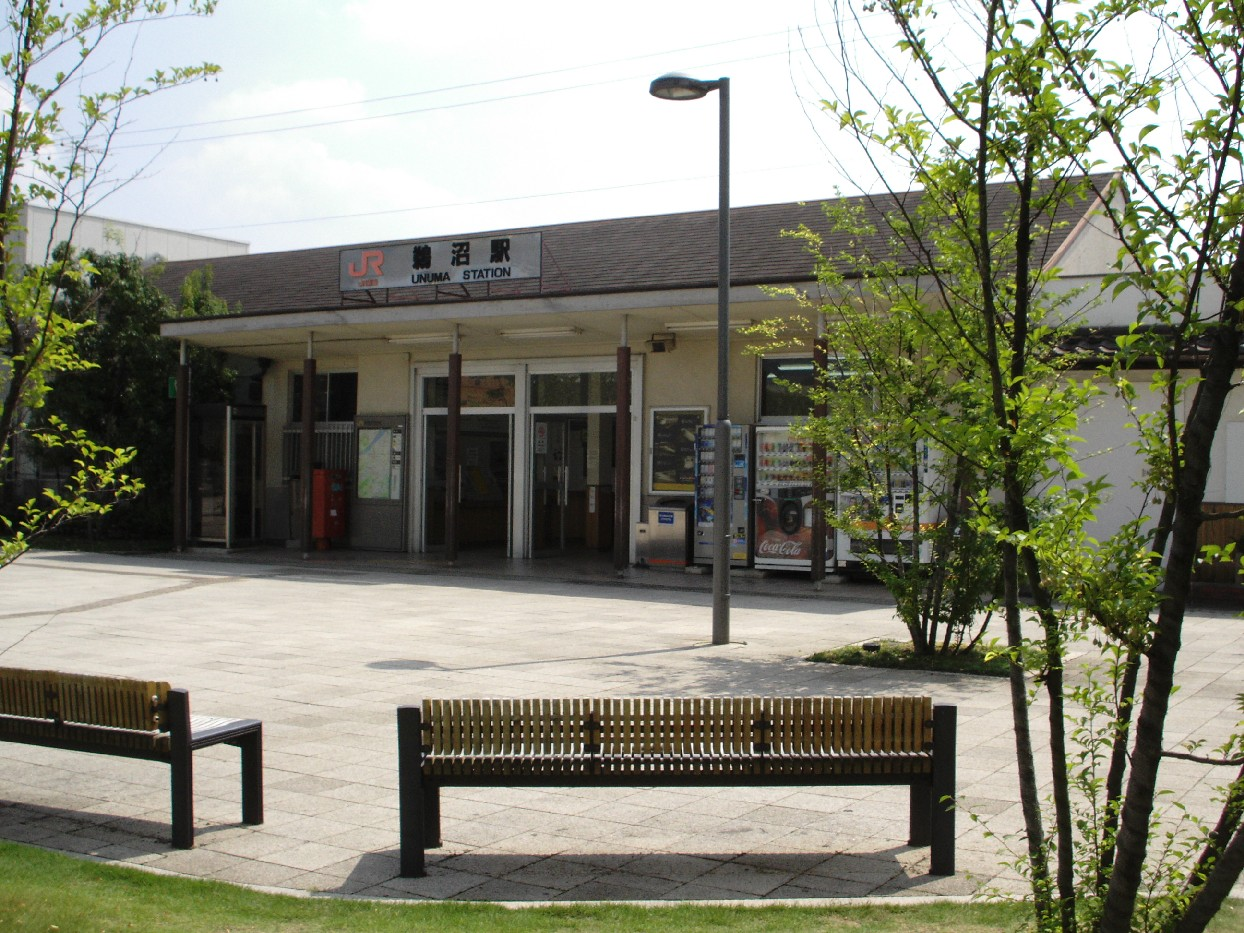
- Unuma Station in August 2006

General information
- Location: 3-81-1 Unuma-Yamazaki, Kakamigahara-shi, Gifu-ken 509-0124; Japan
- Coordinates: 35°23′52″N 136°56′46″E
- Operator: JR Central
- Line: Takayama Main Line
- Distance: 17.3 km from Gifu
- Platforms: 1 side + 1 island platform
- Tracks: 3

Other information
- Status: Staffed (Midori no Madoguchi)
- Station code: CG05

History
- Opened: November 12, 1921; 104 years ago

Passengers
- FY2015: 1,377 daily
Location
- Location within Gifu Prefecture Location within Japan

Unuma Station (鵜沼駅, Unuma-eki) is a railway station on the Takayama Main Line in the city of Kakamigahara, Gifu Prefecture, Japan, operated by Central Japan Railway Company (JR Central).

== Lines ==
Unuma Station is served by the JR Central Takayama Main Line, and is located 17.3 kilometers from the official starting point of the line at Gifu.

== Station layout ==
Unuma Station has one ground-level side platform and one ground-level island platform connected by a footbridge. The station has a Midori no Madoguchi staffed ticket office.

=== Platforms ===
| 1 | ■ Takayama Main Line | for Mino-Ōta and Takayama |
| 2 | ■ Takayama Main Line | for Gifu and Nagoya |
| 3 | ■ Takayama Main Line | (starting trains) |

== Adjacent stations ==
| « | Service | » |
Takayama Main Line
| Kagamigahara | Local | Sakahogi |
| Gifu | Limited Express Hida | Mino-Ōta |

== History ==
Unuma Station opened on November 12, 1921. The station was absorbed into the JR Central network upon the privatization of Japanese National Railways (JNR) on April 1, 1987.

== Passenger statistics ==
In fiscal 2015, the station was used by an average of 1,377 passengers daily (boarding passengers only).

== Surrounding area ==
- Meitetsu Shin-Unuma Station (connected by a passageway)

== See also ==
- List of railway stations in Japan
