= Shirakawa, Gifu (town) =

Shirakawa 白川町
- Town
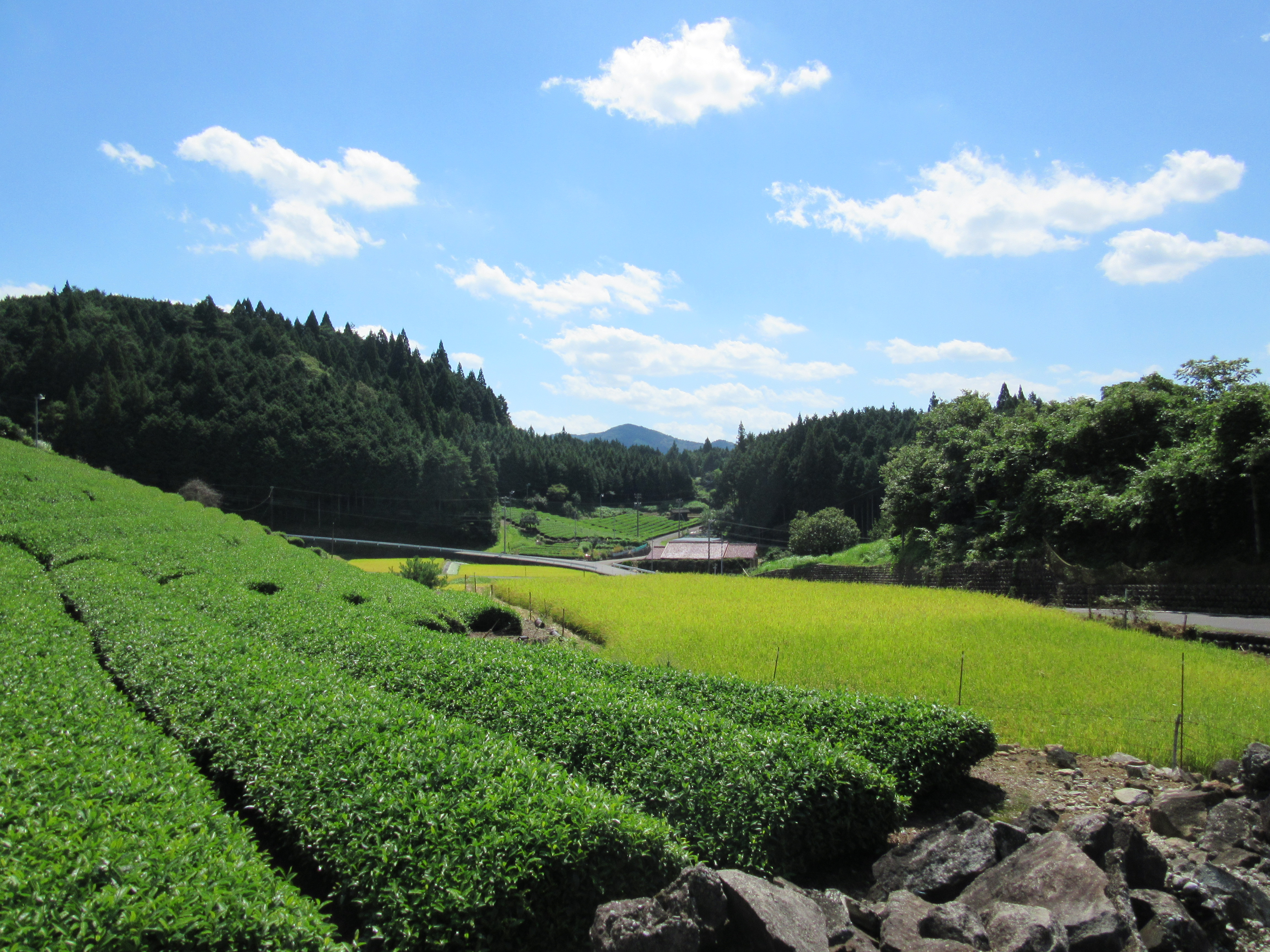
- Shirakawa Hirono tea farm

- Flag Seal

- Location of Shirakawa in Gifu Prefecture

- Coordinates: 35°34′54.8″N 137°11′16.3″E
- Country: Japan
- Region: Chūbu
- Prefecture: Gifu
- District: Kamo

Government
  - Mayor: Yoshihiro Imai

Area
  - Total: 237.90 km^{2} (91.85 sq mi)

Population (January 1, 2019)
  - Total: 8,288
  - Density: 34.84/km^{2} (90.23/sq mi)
- Time zone: UTC+9 (Japan Standard Time)
- Phone number: 0574-72-1311
- Address: Kawamata 715, Shirakawa-chō, Kamo-gun, Gifu-ken 509-1192
- Climate: Cfa
- Website: Official website (in Japanese)
- Symbols
- Flower: Azalea
- Tree: Hinoki

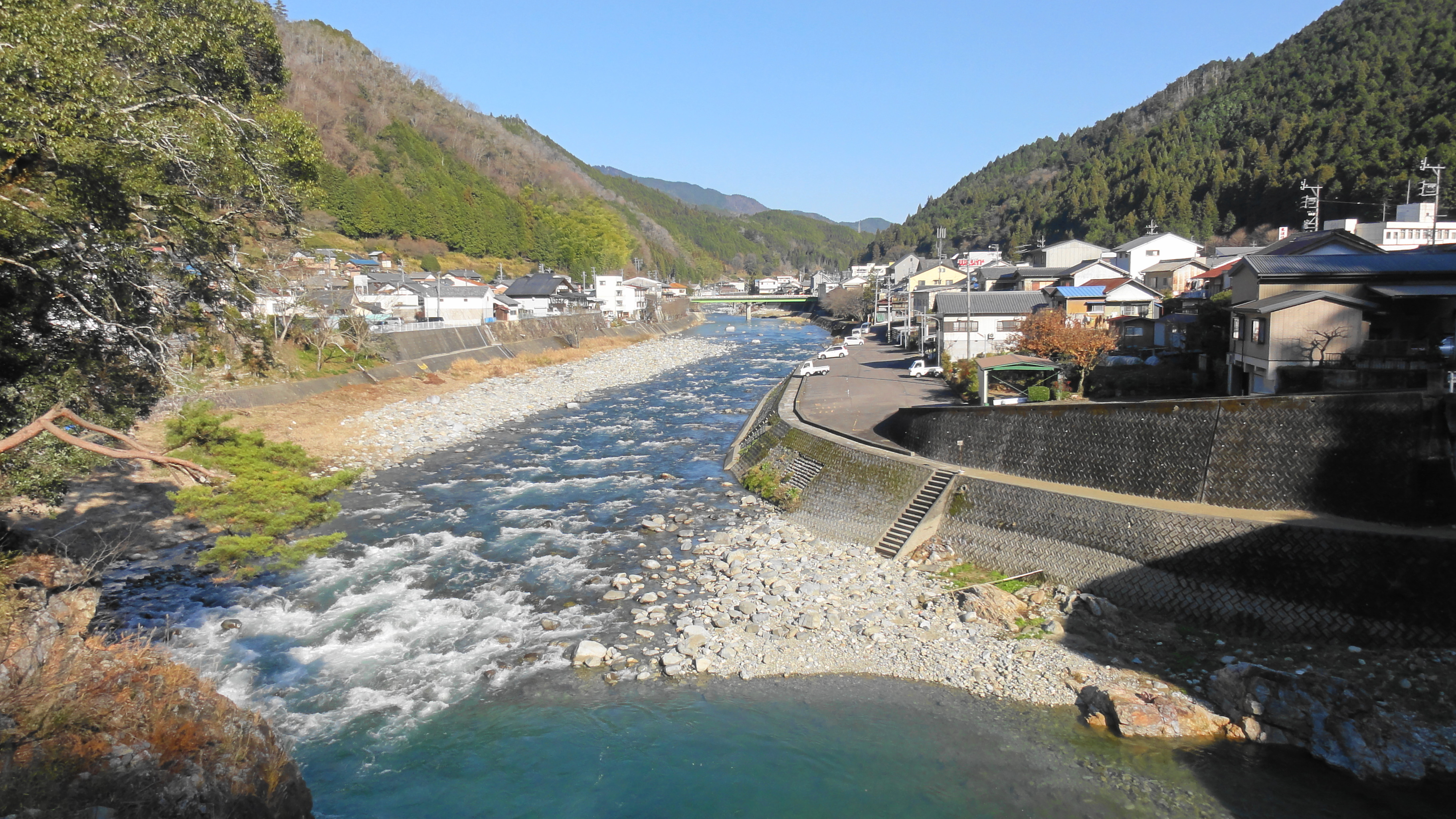
Panorama of Shirakawa

Shirakawa (白川町, Shirakawa-chō) is a town located in Kamo District, Gifu Prefecture, Japan. As of 1 January 2019, the town had an estimated population of 8,288 and a population density of 36 persons per km^{2}, in 3159 households. The total area of the town was 237.90 square kilometres (91.85 sq mi).

== Geography ==
Shirakawa is in the lower reaches of the Japanese Alps in southern Gifu Prefecture. It lies nestled in valleys formed by several rivers, which combine to form the Shirakawa river at one end of the town. The rivers, though substantially developed and altered, remain a source of Ayu, a sweet river fish. The low mountains surrounding the town are heavily forested, primarily with evergreen trees. Japanese macaques, bears, and wild boar are known to live in the local forests. The town has a climate characterized by hot and humid summers, and mild winters (Köppen climate classification Cfa). The average annual temperature in Shirakawa is 11.4 °C. The average annual rainfall is 2238 mm with September as the wettest month. The temperatures are highest on average in August, at around 24.5 °C, and lowest in January, at around -0.9 °C.

=== Neighbouring municipalities ===
- Gifu Prefecture
  - Ena
  - Gero
  - Hichisō
  - Higashishirakawa
  - Nakatsugawa
  - Yaotsu

=== Climate ===
The town has a climate characterized by hot and humid summers, and mild winters (Köppen climate classification Cfa). The average annual temperature in Nakatsugawa is 11.9 °C (53.4 °F). The average annual rainfall is 2,176.0 mm (85.67 in) with July as the wettest month. The temperatures are highest on average in August, at around 24.1 °C (75.4 °F), and lowest in January, at around 0.0 °C (32.0 °F).

Climate data for Kurokawa, Shirakawa (1998−2020 normals, extremes 1998−present)
Month	Jan	Feb	Mar	Apr	May	Jun	Jul	Aug	Sep	Oct	Nov	Dec	Year
Record high °C (°F)	14.2 (57.6)	18.8 (65.8)	22.0 (71.6)	27.9 (82.2)	31.4 (88.5)	33.3 (91.9)	37.2 (99.0)	37.4 (99.3)	35.3 (95.5)	29.8 (85.6)	22.9 (73.2)	19.7 (67.5)	37.4 (99.3)
Mean daily maximum °C (°F)	5.4 (41.7)	7.0 (44.6)	11.3 (52.3)	17.0 (62.6)	22.3 (72.1)	25.1 (77.2)	28.5 (83.3)	30.2 (86.4)	26.2 (79.2)	20.4 (68.7)	14.3 (57.7)	7.9 (46.2)	18.0 (64.3)
Daily mean °C (°F)	0.0 (32.0)	1.0 (33.8)	4.6 (40.3)	10.1 (50.2)	15.5 (59.9)	19.4 (66.9)	23.2 (73.8)	24.1 (75.4)	20.5 (68.9)	14.3 (57.7)	7.9 (46.2)	2.4 (36.3)	11.9 (53.5)
Mean daily minimum °C (°F)	−4.4 (24.1)	−3.9 (25.0)	−1.1 (30.0)	3.8 (38.8)	9.4 (48.9)	14.8 (58.6)	19.4 (66.9)	20.1 (68.2)	16.4 (61.5)	9.7 (49.5)	3.0 (37.4)	−1.9 (28.6)	7.1 (44.8)
Record low °C (°F)	−12.8 (9.0)	−12.3 (9.9)	−10.2 (13.6)	−5.3 (22.5)	−0.8 (30.6)	5.9 (42.6)	13.7 (56.7)	11.5 (52.7)	6.2 (43.2)	−0.5 (31.1)	−4.1 (24.6)	−10.6 (12.9)	−12.8 (9.0)
Average precipitation mm (inches)	76.2 (3.00)	103.0 (4.06)	173.5 (6.83)	180.2 (7.09)	187.4 (7.38)	244.2 (9.61)	332.8 (13.10)	232.1 (9.14)	256.4 (10.09)	196.3 (7.73)	107.0 (4.21)	85.7 (3.37)	2,176 (85.67)
Average precipitation days (≥ 1.0 mm)	10.0	9.1	11.3	11.3	11.5	14.0	16.0	13.1	11.9	10.9	8.7	10.3	138.1
Mean monthly sunshine hours	162.0	169.5	195.3	202.3	222.3	163.3	167.0	199.1	162.4	172.6	163.5	145.5	2,124.6
Source: Japan Meteorological Agency

== Demographics ==
Per Japanese census data, the population of Shirakawa has declined steadily over the past 50 years.

Historical population
Year	Pop.	±%
1970	14,059	—
1980	12,922	−8.1%
1990	12,118	−6.2%
2000	11,282	−6.9%
2010	9,530	−15.5%
2020	7,412	−22.2%

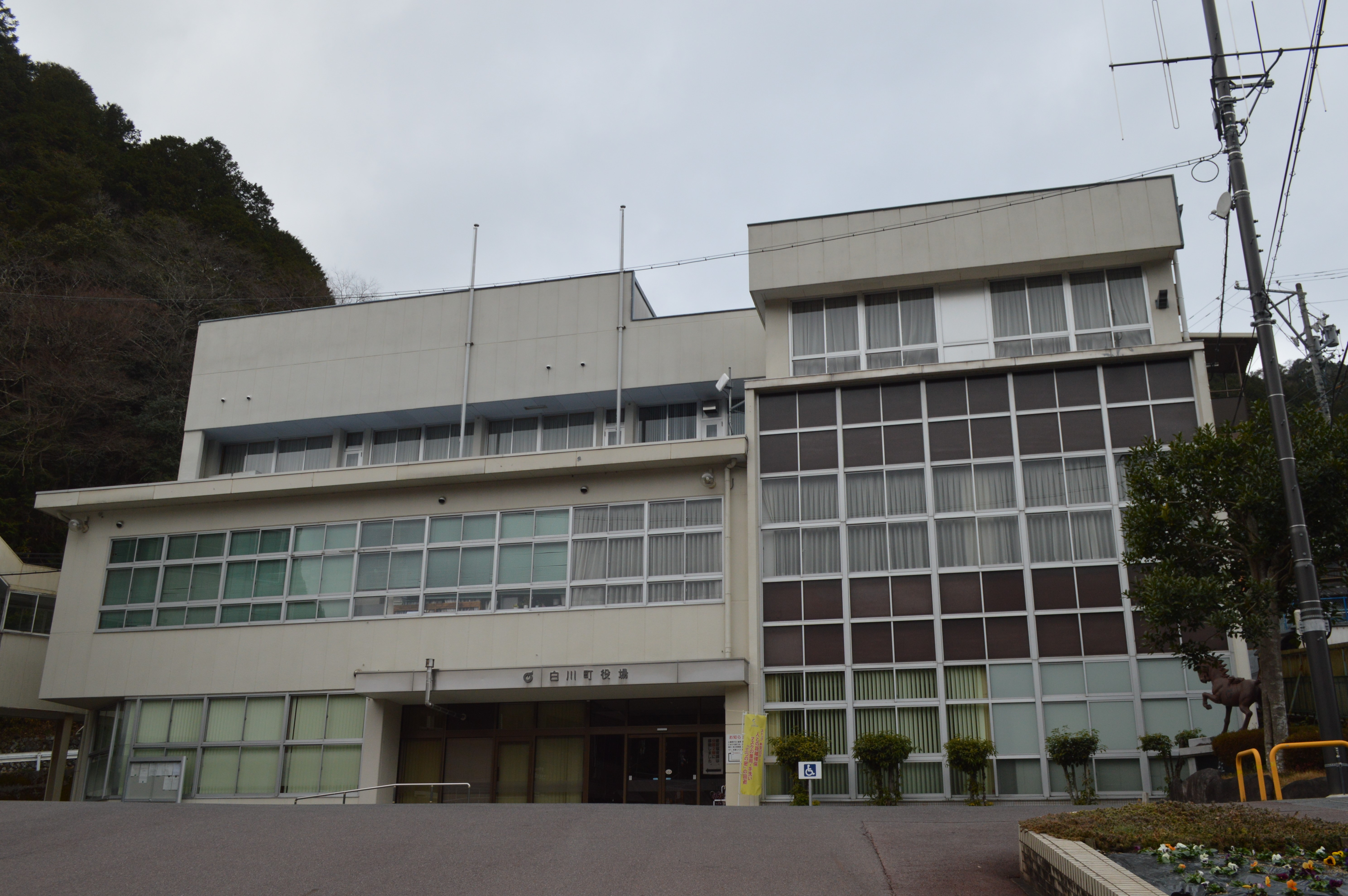
Old Shirakawa town hall

== History ==
The area around Shirakawa was part of traditional Mino Province. During the Edo period, it was largely controlled by Owari Domain under the Tokugawa shogunate. During the post-Meiji restoration cadastral reforms, the area was organised into Mugi District, Gifu. The village of Sakanohigashi was formed on April 1, 1897 with the establishment of the modern municipalities system. In 1953 the hamlet of Nishi-Shirakawa separated out to form the town of Shirakawa and joined Kamo District., and the following year Shirakawa annexed the remainder of Sakanohigashi village. In 1956, Shirakawa annexed the villages of Kurosawa, Sami, and Sahara.

== Economy ==
The local economy is dominated by forestry and agriculture. Shirakawa is noted for its production of Hinoki wood, and also of green tea.

== Education ==
Shirakawa has five public elementary schools and three public middle schools operated by the town government. The town does not have a high school.

== Transportation ==
=== Railway ===
- Central Japan Railway Company - Takayama Main Line
  - Shirakawaguchi Station
  - Shimoyui Station

=== Highway ===
- National Route 41
- National Route 256

== Sister cities ==
- Pistoia, Tuscany, Italy, since October 30, 1994
- Songyuan, Jilin, China, friendship city since 1981
