= Tsunogawa Station =

Railway station in Hida, Gifu Prefecture, Japan

Tsunogawa Station 角川駅
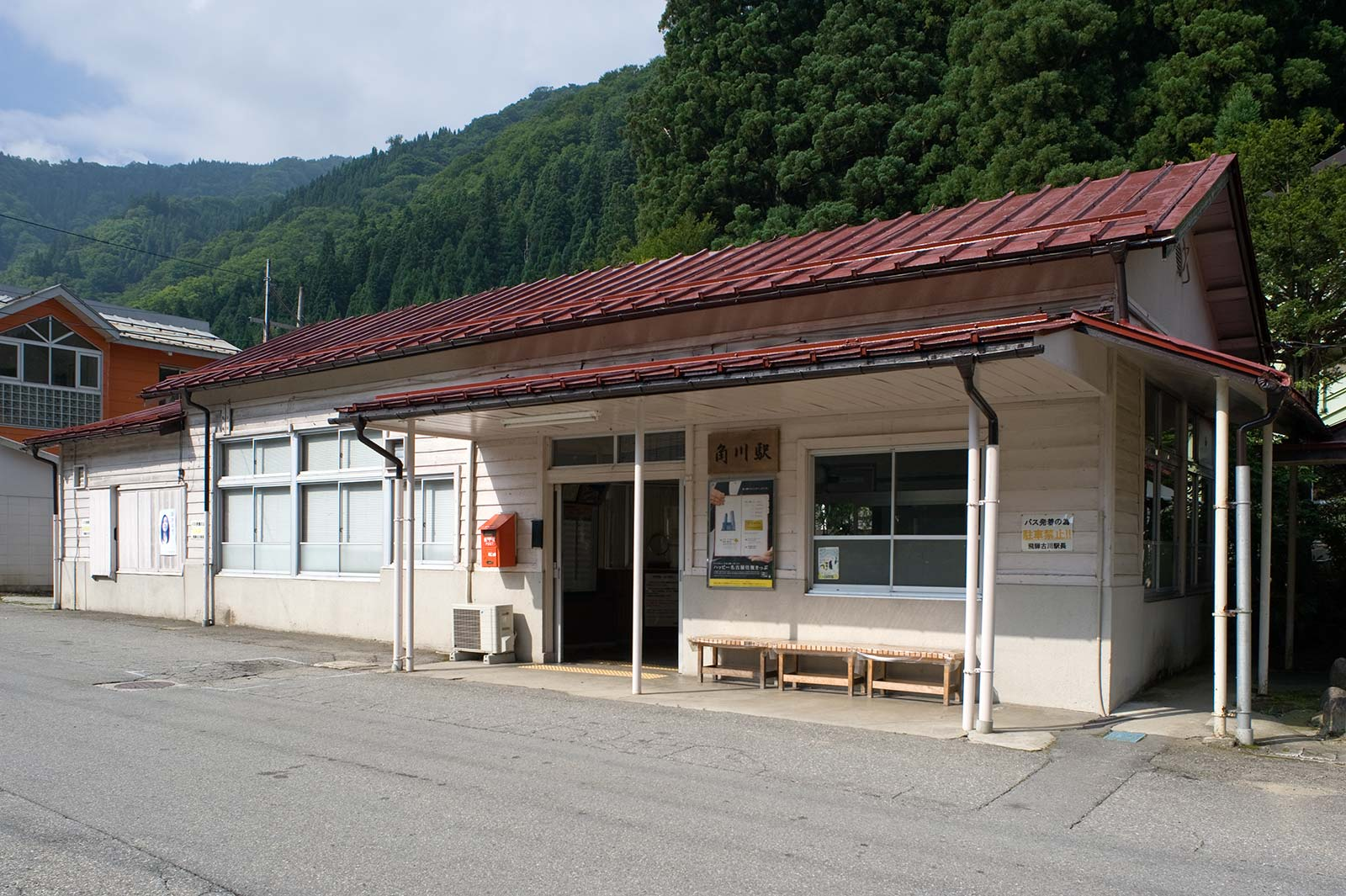
- Tsunogawa Station in July 2008

General information
- Location: Kawai-cho Komukari, Takayama-shi, Gifu-ken 509-4302; Japan
- Coordinates: 36.3001°N 137.1129°E
- Operator: JR Central
- Line: Takayama Main Line
- Distance: 161.7 km from Gifu
- Platforms: 1 side platform
- Tracks: 1

Other information
- Status: Unstaffed

History
- Opened: October 25, 1934
Location
- Location within Gifu Prefecture Location within Japan

Tsunogawa Station (角川駅, Tsunogawa-eki) is a railway station on the Takayama Main Line in the city of Hida, Gifu Prefecture, Japan, operated by Central Japan Railway Company (JR Central).

== Lines ==
Tsunogawa Station is served by the JR Central Takayama Main Line, and is located 161.7 kilometers from the official starting point of the line at Gifu.

== Station layout ==
Tsunogawa Station has one ground-level side platform serving single bi-directional track. The station is unattended.

== Adjacent stations ==
«	Service	»
Takayama Main Line
Limited Express "Hida": Does not stop at this station
Hida-Hosoe	Local	Sakakami

== History ==
Tsunogawa Station opened on October 25, 1934. The station was absorbed into the JR Central network upon the privatization of Japanese National Railways (JNR) on April 1, 1987.

== Surrounding area ==
- National Route 471

== See also ==
- List of railway stations in Japan
