= Inotani Station =

Railway station in Toyama, Toyama Prefecture, Japan

Inotani Station 猪谷駅
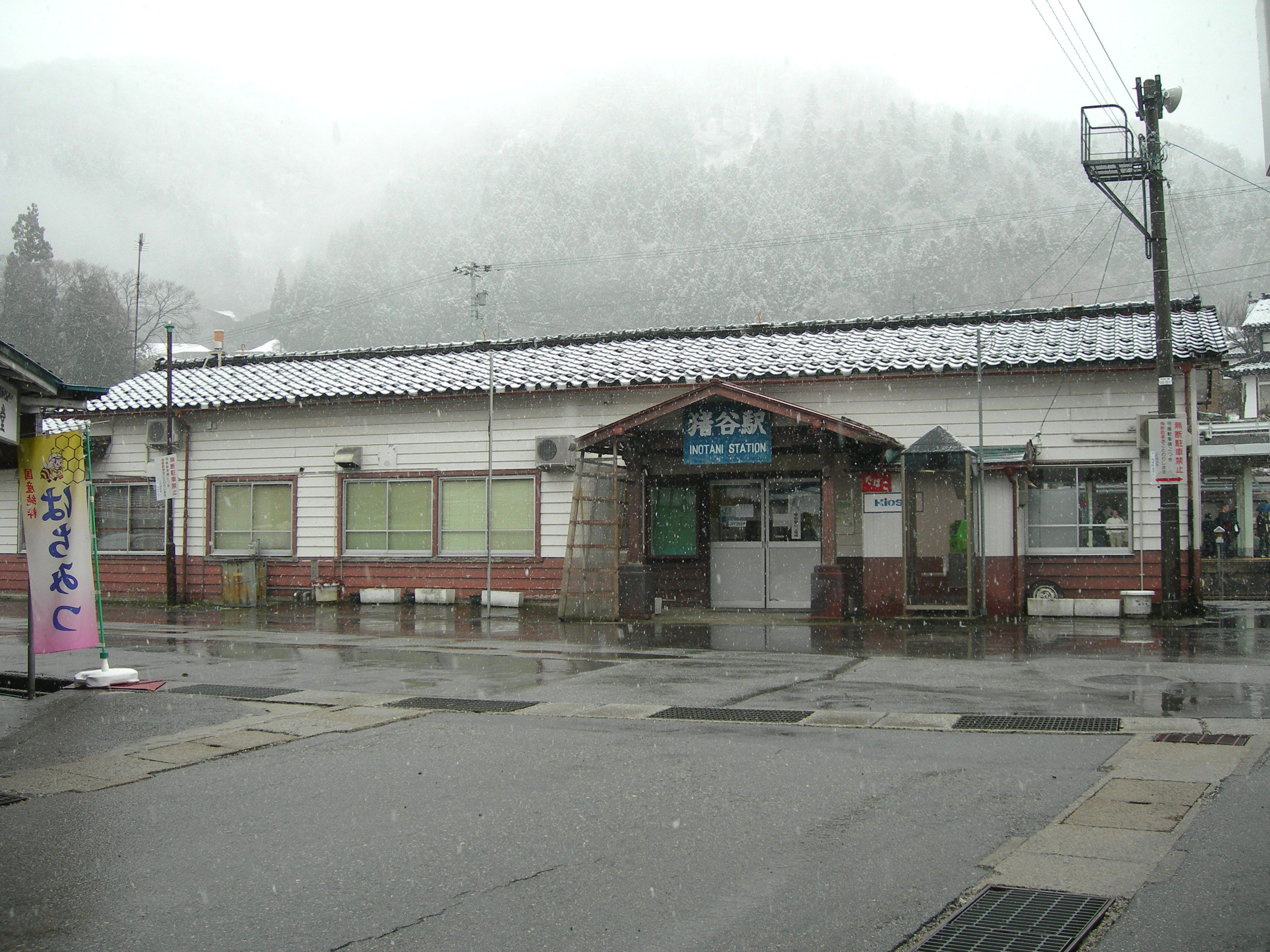
- Inotani Station in March 2010

General information
- Location: Inotani, Toyama City, Toyama Prefecture 939-2187; Japan
- Coordinates: 36.4720°N 137.2377°E
- Operator: JR West
- Line: ■ Takayama Main Line
- Distance: 189.2 km (117.6 mi) from Gifu
- Platforms: 1 island platform
- Tracks: 2
- Train operators: JR West; JR Central

Other information
- Status: Unstaffed
- Website: Official website

History
- Opened: 27 November 1930; 95 years ago
Location
- Location within Toyama Prefecture Location within Japan

Inotani Station (猪谷駅, Inotani-eki) is a railway station on the Takayama Main Line close to the city of Toyama, Toyama Prefecture, Japan, operated by West Japan Railway Company (JR West) and Central Japan Railway Company (JR Central). The station is the boundary for the two railway companies. Therefore, JR Central crews working on Toyama-bound "Hida" Limited Express services will get off here and JR West crews will take over the remaining journey. JR West crews working on Nagoya or Ōsaka-bound "Hida" Limited Express services will get off here and JR Central crews will take over the remaining journey.

== Lines ==
Inotani Station is served by the Takayama Main Line and is located 189.2 kilometers from the official starting point of the line at Gifu.

== Station layout ==
The station has a single island platform serving two tracks, connected to the station building by a level crossing. The station is unattended.

=== Platforms ===
1-2	■ Takayama Main Line	for Toyama
1-2	■ Takayama Main Line	for Takayama and Gero

== Adjacent stations ==
«	Service	»
JR West Takayama Main Line
Terminus	Local	Nirehara
Hida-Furukawa	Limited Express Hida	Etchu-Yatsuo
JR Central Takayama Main Line
Sugihara	Local	Terminus
Hida-Furukawa	Limited Express Hida	Etchu-Yatsuo

== History ==
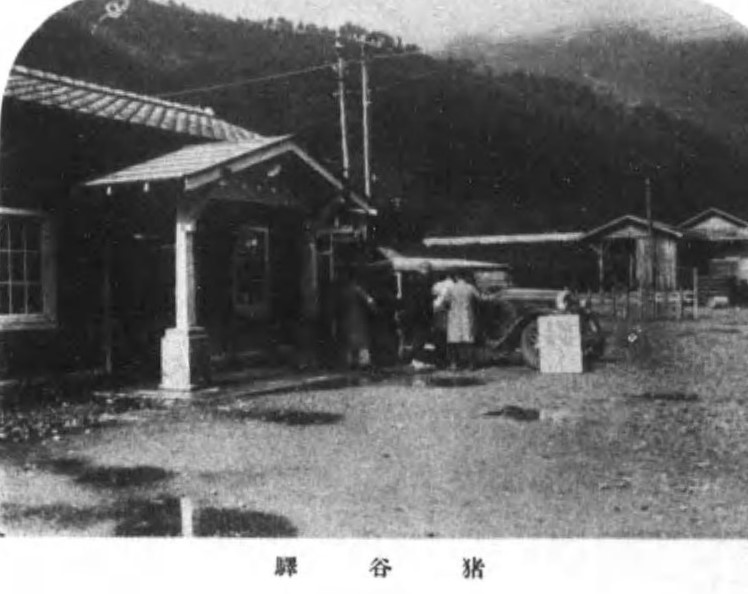
The station in 1934

The station opened on 27 November 1930. With the privatization of Japanese National Railways (JNR) on 1 April 1987, the station came under the control of JR West.

== Surrounding area ==
- Jinzū River
- National Route 41

== See also ==
- List of railway stations in Japan
