= Kamo District, Gifu =

District in Gifu prefecture, Japan

Coordinates: 35.579°N 137.179°E

Location of Kamo District in Gifu Prefecture

Kamo (加茂郡, Kamo-gun) is a district located in Gifu Prefecture, Japan. As of July, 2011 the district has an estimated population of 52,536. The total area is 615.17 km^{2}.

== Towns and villages ==
- Hichisō
- Higashishirakawa
- Kawabe
- Sakahogi
- Shirakawa
- Tomika
- Yaotsu

== District timeline ==
- April 1, 1897 - The villages of Sakakura, Torikumi, Ōhari, Kuroiwa, Fukagaya, Katsuyama and Fukada merge to form the village of Sakahogi.
- August 10, 1950 - The Fukada part of Sakahogi merges into the town of Ōta.
- October 1, 1968 - The village of Sakahogi gains town status.
