= Gero Station =

Railway station in Gero, Gifu Prefecture, Japan

Gero Station 下呂駅
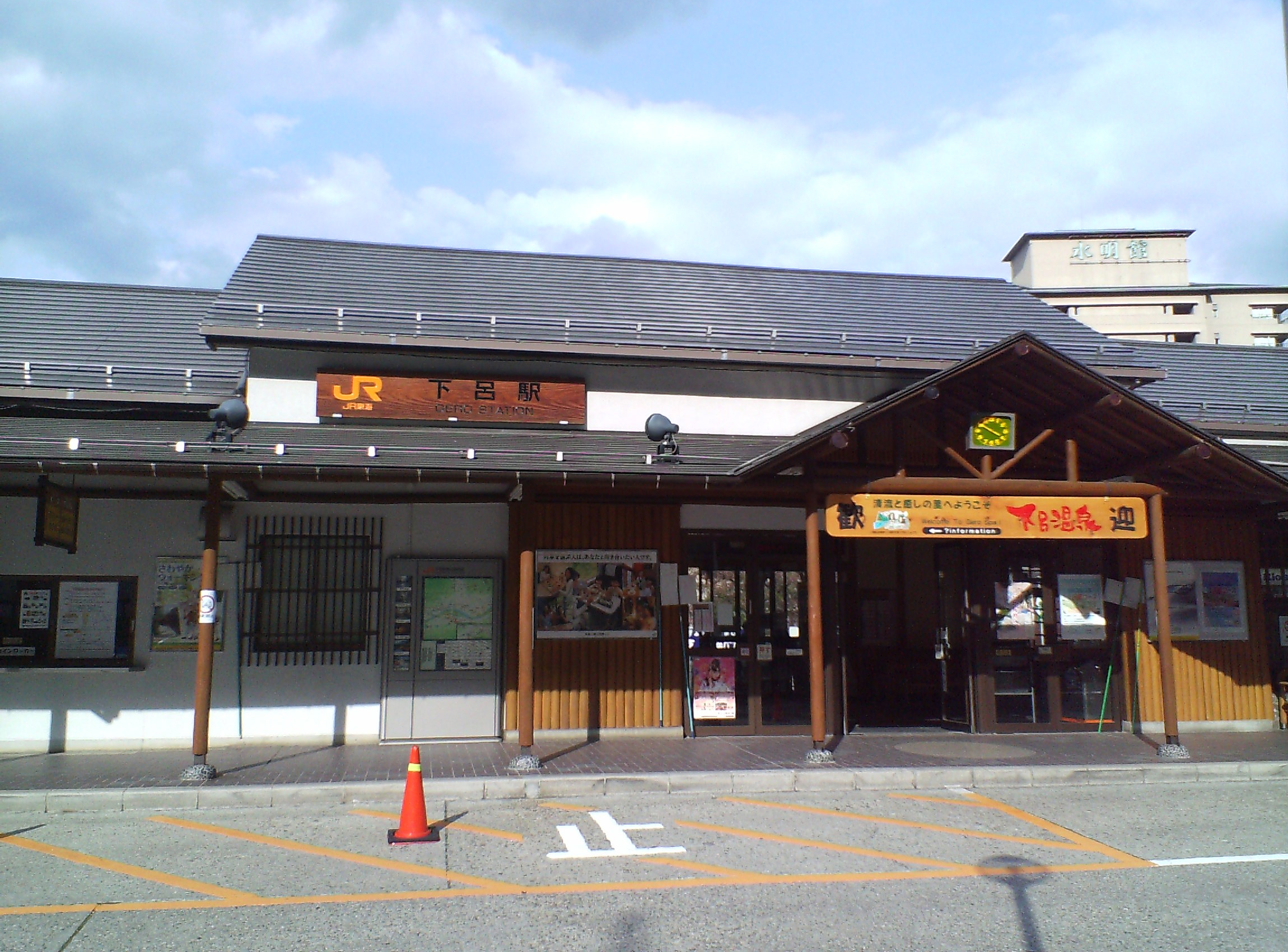
- Gero Station in April 2007

General information
- Location: Koden, Gero-shi, Gifu-ken 509-2206; Japan
- Coordinates: 35.8060°N 137.2390°E
- Operator: JR Central
- Line: Takayama Main Line
- Distance: 88.3 km from Gifu
- Platforms: 1 side + 1 island platform
- Tracks: 3

Other information
- Status: Staffed (Midori no Madoguchi)

History
- Opened: November 2, 1930; 95 years ago

Passengers
- FY2015: 826 daily
Location
- Location within Gifu Prefecture Location within Japan

Gero Station (下呂駅, Gero-eki) is a railway station on the Takayama Main Line in the city of Gero, Gifu Prefecture, Japan, operated by Central Japan Railway Company (JR Central).

== Lines ==
Gero Station is served by the JR Central Takayama Main Line, and is located 88.3 kilometers from the official starting point of the line at Gifu.

== Station layout ==
Gero Station has one ground-level island platform and one ground-level side platform connected by a footbridge. The station has a Midori no Madoguchi staffed ticket office.

=== Platforms ===
1-3	■ Takayama Main Line	for Gifu and Nagoya for Mino-Ōta and Takayama

== Adjacent stations ==
«	Service	»
Takayama Main Line
Yakeishi	Local	Zenshōji
Hida-Kanayama	Limited Express Hida	Hida-Hagiwara

== History ==
Gero Station opened on November 2, 1930. The station was absorbed into the JR Central network upon the privatization of Japanese National Railways (JNR) on April 1, 1987.

== Passenger statistics ==
In fiscal 2015, the station was used by an average of 826 passengers daily (boarding passengers only).

== Surrounding area ==
- Gero City Hall
- Hida River
- National Route 41

== Bus routes ==
- Nohi Bus
  - For Shirakawa-go Bus Terminal
  - For Takayama Station
  - For Hida-Osaka Station
  - For Hida-Hagiwara Station
  - For Kashimo General Office (At this bus stop, passengers are able to transfer onto Kita-Ena Kotsu Bus bound to Tadachi Station and Nakatsugawa Station)
  - For Norimasa Yuya

== See also ==
- List of railway stations in Japan
