= Shiminkōen-mae Station =

Railway station in Kakamigahara, Gifu Prefecture, Japan

Shiminkōen-mae Station 市民公園前駅

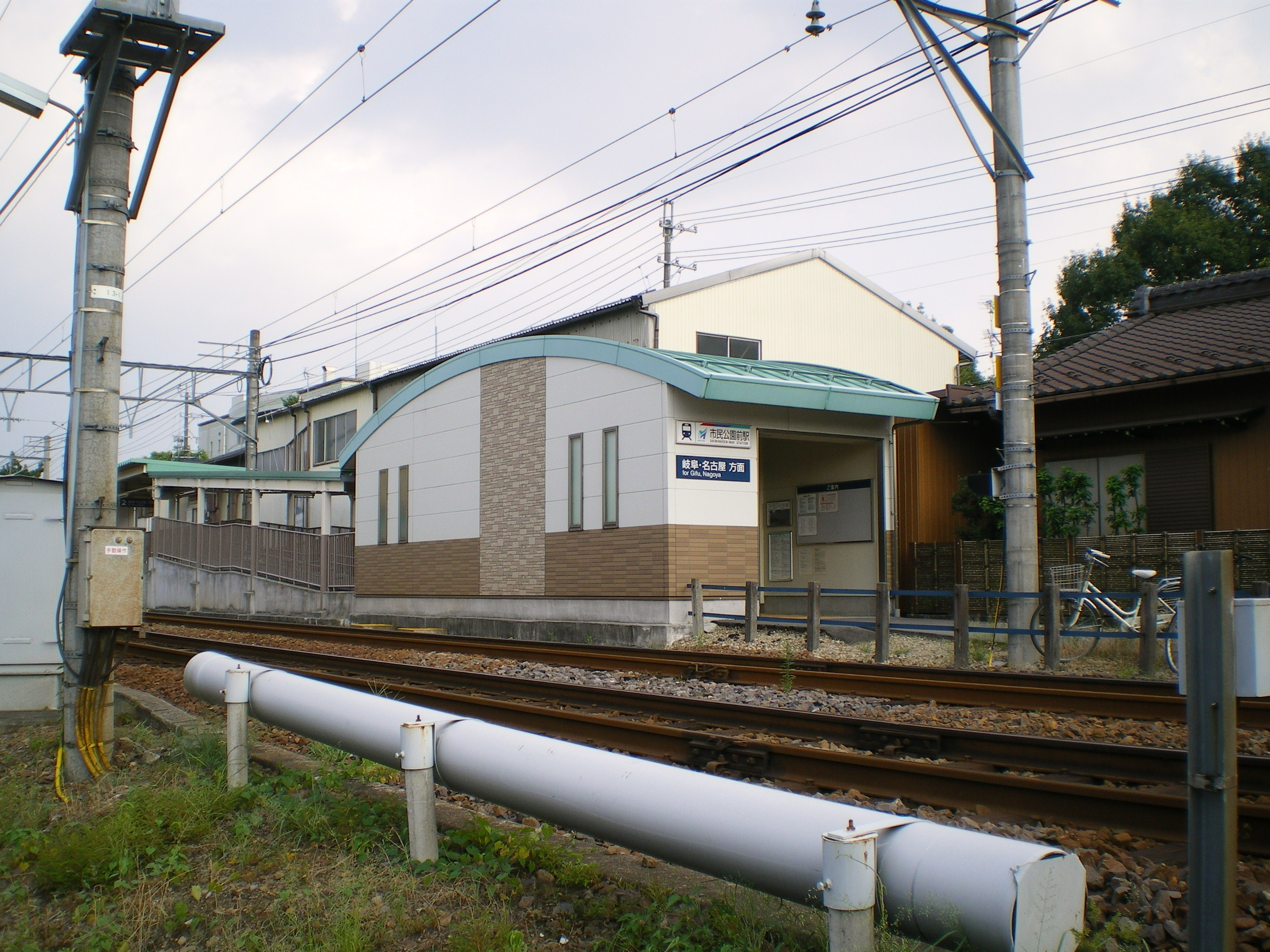
- Shiminkōen-mae Station, September 2009

General information
- Location: 4-51 Naka-Monzen-chō, Kakamigahara-shi, Gifu-ken 504-0911; Japan
- Coordinates: 35.4008°N 136.8419°E
- Operator: Meitetsu
- Line: ■Meitetsu Kakamigahara Line
- Distance: 8.1 km from Meitetsu-Gifu
- Platforms: 2 side platforms

Other information
- Status: Untaffed
- Station code: KG09
- Website: Official website (in Japanese)

History
- Opened: January 21, 1926
- Former names: Kōnō Station (to 1944); Nōdai-mae (1946-1949); Gifu Daigaku-mae (1949-1989)

Passengers
- FY2015: 330

Services
Preceding station	Meitetsu	Following station
Kakamigahara Shiyakusho-mae towards Shin Unuma	Kakamigahara Line Local	Shin Naka towards Meitetsu Gifu
Location
- Location within Gifu Prefecture Location within Japan

Shiminkōen-mae Station (市民公園前駅, Shiminkōen-mae-eki) is a railway station located in the city of Kakamigahara, Gifu Prefecture, Japan, operated by the private railway operator Meitetsu.

== Lines ==
Shiminkōen-mae Station is a station on the Kakamigahara Line, and is located 8.1 kilometers from the terminus of the line at Meitetsu-Gifu.

== Station layout ==
Shiminkōen-mae Station has two opposed ground-level side platforms. The station is unattended.

=== Platforms ===
1	■ Meitetsu Kakamigahara Line	For Mikakino, Shin-Unuma, and Inuyama
2	■ Meitetsu Kakamigahara Line	For Meitetsu Gifu and Meitetsu-Nagoya

== History ==
Shiminkōen-mae Station opened on January 21, 1926 as Kōnō Station (高農駅). The station was closed from 1944 to September 15, 1946. It was renamed Nōdai-mae Station (農大前駅) on December 1, 1949, and renamed again to Gifu Daigaku-mae Station (岐阜大学前駅) on October 1, 1954. It was renamed to its present name on July 9, 1989.

== Surrounding area ==
- Gifu Public Park

== See also ==
- List of railway stations in Japan
