= Haba Station (Gifu) =

Railway station in Kakamigahara, Gifu Prefecture, Japan

Haba Station 羽場駅

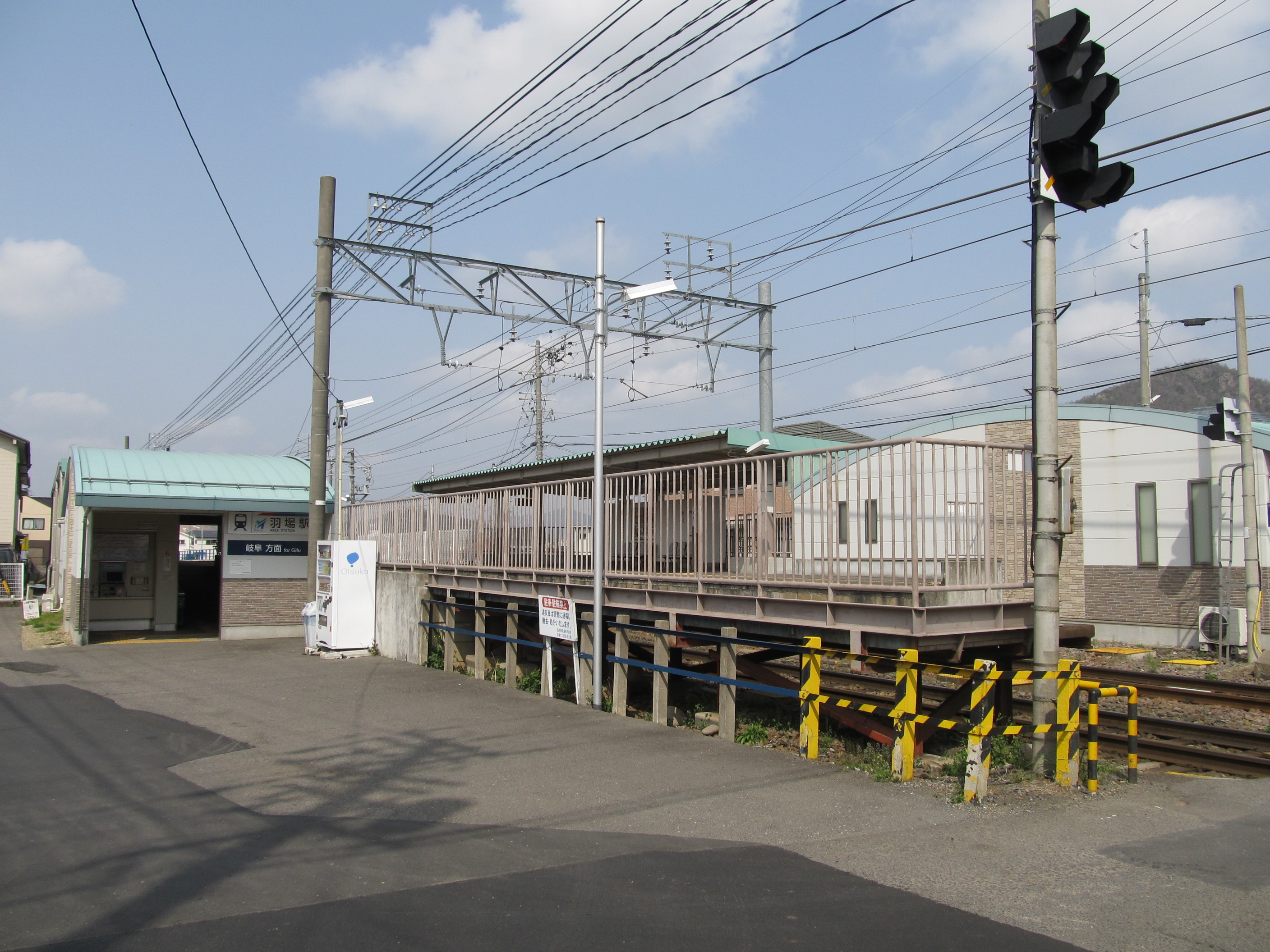
- Haba Station, March 2015

General information
- Location: 176 Unuma-Haba-chō, Kakamigahara-shi, Gifu-ken 504-0905; Japan
- Coordinates: 35.4010°N 136.8620°E
- Operator: Meitetsu
- Line: ■Meitetsu Kakamigahara Line
- Distance: 9.9 km from Meitetsu-Gifu
- Platforms: 2 side platforms

Other information
- Status: Unstaffed
- Station code: KG02
- Website: Official website (in Japanese)

History
- Opened: September 20, 1927

Passengers
- FY2015: 1022

Services
| Preceding station | Meitetsu | Following station |
|---|---|---|
| Unumajuku towards Shin Unuma | Kakamigahara Line Local | Ogase towards Meitetsu Gifu |
Location
- Location within Gifu Prefecture Location within Japan

Haba Station (羽場駅, Haba-eki) is a railway station located in the city of Kakamigahara, Gifu Prefecture, Japan, operated by the private railway operator Meitetsu.

== Lines ==
Haba Station is a station on the Kakamigahara Line, and is located 15.5 kilometers from the terminus of the line at Meitetsu Gifu.

== Station layout ==
Haba Station has two ground-level opposed side platforms connected by a level crossing. The station is unattended.

=== Platforms ===
| 1 | ■ Meitetsu Kakamigahara Line | For Shin-Unuma, and Inuyama |
| 2 | ■ Meitetsu Kakamigahara Line | For Mikakino, Meitetsu Gifu and Meitetsu-Nagoya |

== History ==
Haba Station opened on September 20, 1927.

== Surrounding area ==
- Unuma Junior High School
- National Route 21

== See also ==
- List of railway stations in Japan
