= Kakamigahara-Shiyakusho-mae Station =

Railway station in Kakamigahara, Gifu Prefecture, Japan

Kakamigahara-Shiyakusho-mae Station 各務原市役所前駅

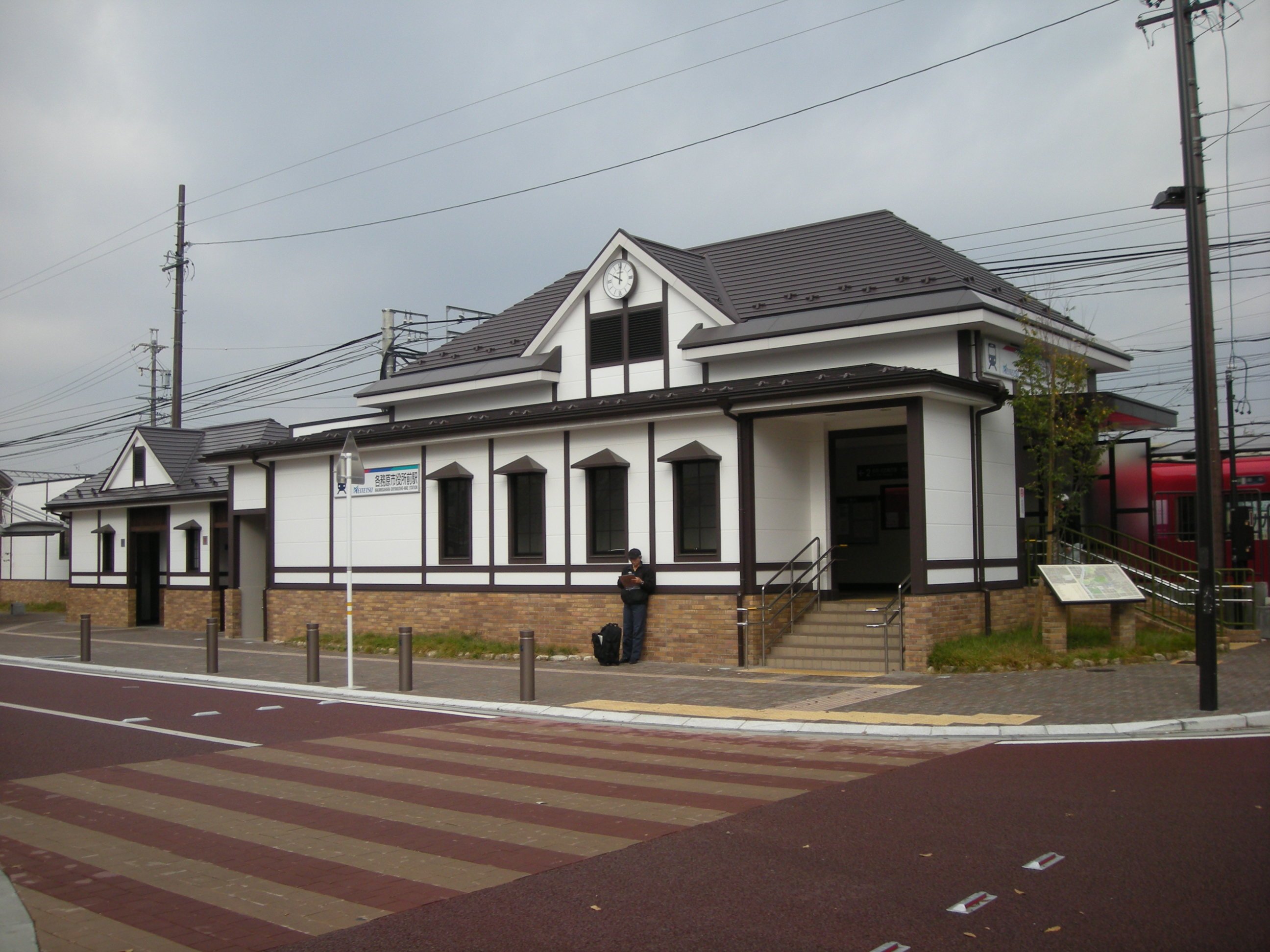
- Kakamigahara-Shiyakusho-mae Station in September 2009

General information
- Location: Naka-Sakuramachi, Kakamigahara-shi, Gifu-ken 504-0912; Japan
- Coordinates: 35.4000°N 136.8339°E
- Operator: Meitetsu
- Line: ■ Meitetsu Kakamigahara Line
- Distance: 7.5 km from Meitetsu-Gifu
- Platforms: 2 side platforms

Other information
- Status: Unstaffed
- Station code: KG08
- Website: Official website (in Japanese)

History
- Opened: January 21, 1926

Passengers
- FY2015: 3,844 daily

Services
Preceding station	Meitetsu	Following station
Rokken towards Shin Unuma	Kakamigahara Line Rapid Express Express	Shin Naka towards Meitetsu Gifu
Rokken towards Shin Unuma	Kakamigahara Line Local	Shiminkōen-mae towards Meitetsu Gifu
Location
- Location within Gifu Prefecture Location within Japan

Kakamigahara-Shiyakusho-mae Station (各務原市役所前駅, Kakamigahara Shiyakusho-mae-eki) is a railway station on the Meitetsu Kakamigahara Line in the city of Kakamigahara, Gifu Prefecture, Japan, operated by the private railway operator Meitetsu.

== Lines ==
Kakamigahara Shiyakusho-mae Station is served by the Meitetsu Kakamigahara Line, and is located 8.7 kilometers from the terminus of the line at Meitetsu-Gifu.

== Station layout ==
Kakamigahara Shiyakusho-mae Station has two ground-level opposed side platforms. The station is unattended.

=== Platforms ===
1	■ Meitetsu Kakamigahara Line	For Mikakino, Shin-Unuma, and Inuyama
2	■ Meitetsu Kakamigahara Line	For Meitetsu Gifu and Meitetsu-Nagoya

== History ==
The station opened on January 21, 1926, as Ichirentai-mae Station (一聯隊前駅). It was renamed Kagamihara Undōjō-mae Station (各務原運動場前駅) on December 1, 1938, Undōjō-mae Station (運動場前駅) on December 1, 1949, Kagamihara Hikōjō Station (各務原飛行場駅) on November 1, 1960, Kakamihara Hikōjō Station (各務原飛行場駅) on October 1, 1965, and Kakamigahara-Shiyakusho-mae Station on January 29, 2005.

== Surrounding area ==
- Kakamigahara City Hall
- Gifu Air Field
- Kakamigahara Aerospace Science Museum

== See also ==
- List of railway stations in Japan
