= Shin Kanō Station =

Railway station in Gifu, Gifu Prefecture, Japan

Shin Kanō Station 新加納駅

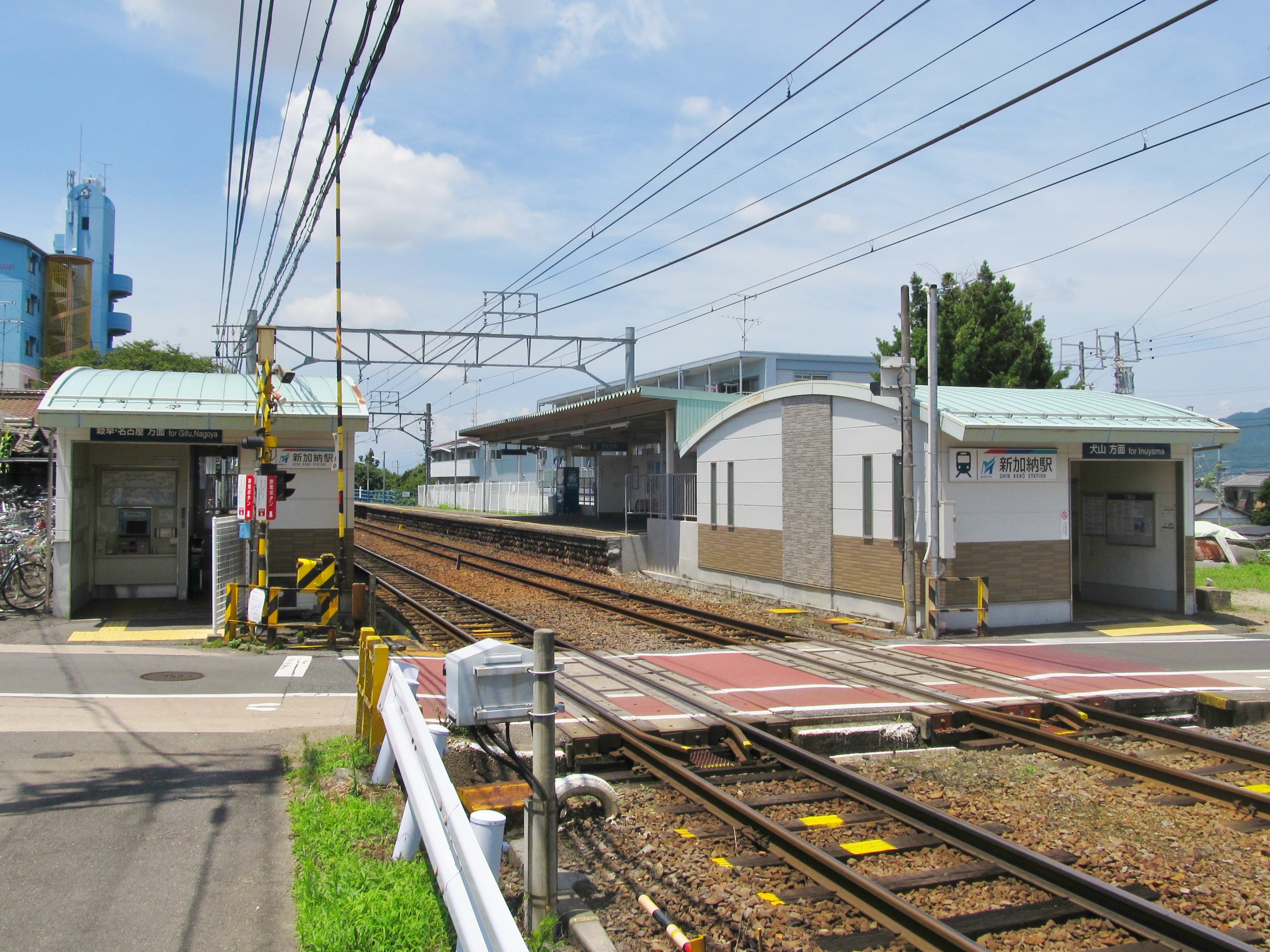
- Shin Kanō Station, July 2017

General information
- Location: 1 Chome Nakahamamichō, Kakamigahara-shi, Gifu-ken 504-0034; Japan
- Coordinates: 35.3993°N 136.8243°E
- Operator: Meitetsu
- Line: ■Meitetsu Kakamigahara Line
- Distance: 6.6 km from Meitetsu-Gifu
- Platforms: 2 side platforms

Other information
- Status: Unstaffed
- Station code: KG11
- Website: Official website (in Japanese)

History
- Opened: January 21, 1926

Passengers
- FY2013: 1355

Services
Preceding station	Meitetsu	Following station
Shin Naka towards Shin Unuma	Kakamigahara Line Local	Takadabashi towards Meitetsu Gifu
Location
- Location within Gifu Prefecture Location within Japan

Shin Kanō Station (新加納駅, Shin Kanō-eki) is a railway station located in the city of Kakamigahara, Gifu Prefecture, Japan, operated by the private railway operator Meitetsu.

== Lines ==
Shin Kanō Station is a station on the Kakamigahara Line, and is located 6.6 kilometers from the terminus of the line at Meitetsu-Gifu.

== Station layout ==
track layout

Shin Kanō Station has two ground-level opposed side platforms connected by a level crossing. The station is unattended.

=== Platforms ===
1	■ Meitetsu Kakamigahara Line	For Mikakino, Shin-Unuma, and Inuyama
2	■ Meitetsu Kakamigahara Line	For Meitetsu Gifu and Meitetsu-Nagoya

== History ==
Shin Kanō Station opened on January 21, 1926.

== Surrounding area ==
- Shinkanō-juku

== See also ==
- List of railway stations in Japan
