= Shin Naka Station =

Railway station in Kakamigahara, Gifu Prefecture, Japan

Shin Naka Station 新那加駅

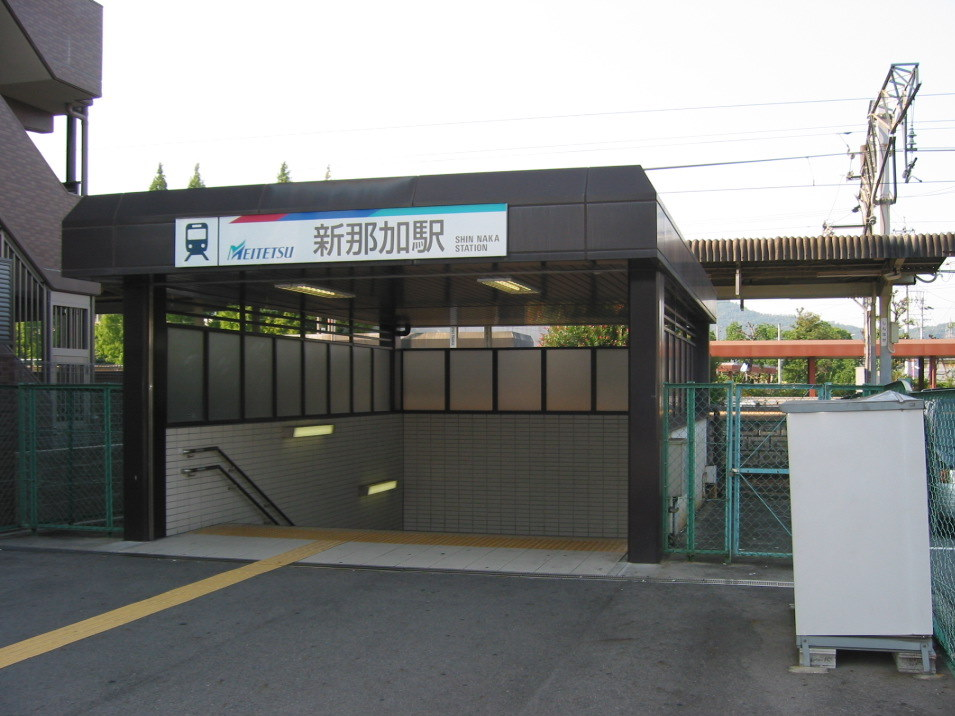
- Shin Naka Station, September 2009

General information
- Location: Naka-Shinnaka-chō, Kakamigahara-shi, Gifu-ken 504-0034; Japan
- Coordinates: 35.4000°N 136.8339°E
- Operator: Meitetsu
- Line: ■Meitetsu Kakamigahara Line
- Distance: 7.5 km from Meitetsu-Gifu
- Platforms: 1 island platform

Other information
- Status: Staffed
- Station code: KG10
- Website: Official website (in Japanese)

History
- Opened: January 21, 1926
- Former names: Kagamino

Passengers
- FY2015: 1367

Services
Preceding station	Meitetsu	Following station
Kakamigahara-Shiyakusho-mae towards Shin Unuma	Kakamigahara Line Rapid Express Express	Kiridōshi towards Meitetsu Gifu
Shimin-Kōen-mae towards Shin Unuma	Kakamigahara Line Local	Shin Kanō towards Meitetsu Gifu
Location
- Location within Gifu Prefecture Location within Japan

Shin Naka Station (新那加駅, Shin Naka-eki) is a railway station located in the city of Kakamigahara, Gifu Prefecture, Japan, operated by the private railway operator Meitetsu.

== Lines ==
Shin Naka Station is a station on the Kakamigahara Line, and is located 7.5 kilometers from the terminus of the line at Meitetsu-Gifu.

== Station layout ==
Shin Naka Station has one ground-level island platform connected to the station building by a pedestrian tunnel. The station is staffed.

=== Platforms ===
1	■ Meitetsu Kakamigahara Line	For Mikakino, Shin-Unuma, and Inuyama
2	■ Meitetsu Kakamigahara Line	For Meitetsu Gifu and Meitetsu-Nagoya

== History ==
Shin Naka Station opened on January 21, 1926 as Kagamino Station (各務野駅). It was renamed to its present name on July of the same year.

== Surrounding area ==
- Naka Station on the JR Central Takayama Main Line

== See also ==
- List of railway stations in Japan
