= Hosobata Station =

Railway station in Gifu, Gifu Prefecture, Japan

Hosobata Station 細畑駅

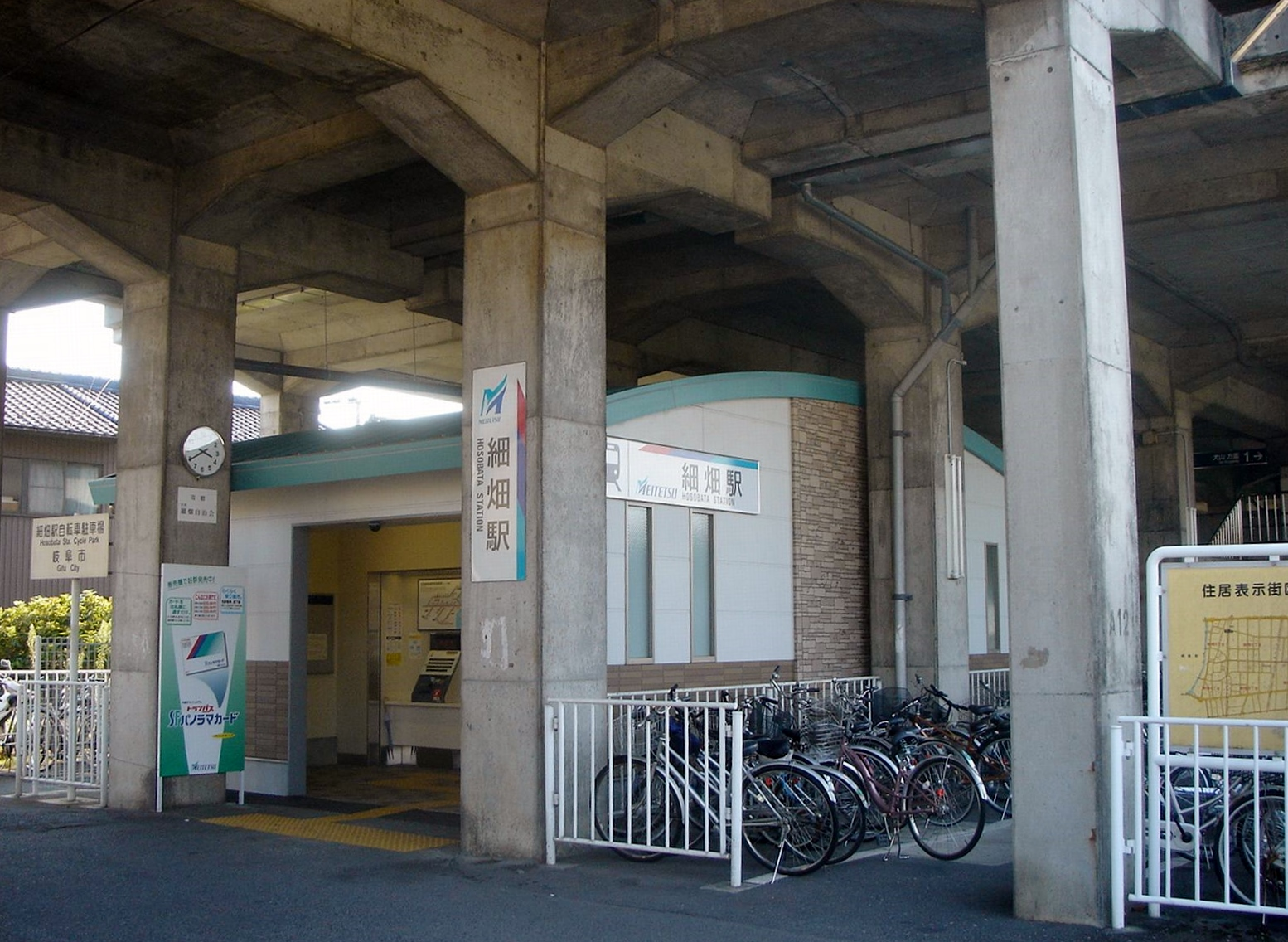
- Hosobata Station, August 2007

General information
- Location: 5-1 Hosobata-cho, Gifu-shi, Gifu-ken 500-8238; Japan
- Coordinates: 35°24′06″N 136°47′07″E
- Operator: Meitetsu
- Line: ■Meitetsu Kakamigahara Line
- Distance: 2.9 km from Meitetsu-Gifu
- Platforms: 2 side platforms

Other information
- Status: Unstaffed
- Station code: KG15
- Website: Official website (in Japanese)

History
- Opened: January 21, 1926

Passengers
- FY2013: 1787

Services
Preceding station	Meitetsu	Following station
Kiridōshi towards Shin Unuma	Kakamigahara Line Local	Tagami towards Meitetsu Gifu
Location
- Location within Japan

Hosobata Station (細畑駅, Hosobata-eki) is a railway station located in the city of Gifu, Gifu Prefecture, Japan, operated by the private railway operator Meitetsu.

== Lines ==
Hasobata Station is a station on the Kakamigahara Line, and is located 2.9 kilometers from the terminus of the line at Meitetsu Gifu.

== Station layout ==
track layout

Hosobata Station has two elevated opposed side platforms with the station building underneath. The station is unattended.

=== Platforms ===
1	■ Meitetsu Kakamigahara Line	For Mikakino, Shin-Unuma, and Inuyama
2	■ Meitetsu Kakamigahara Line	For Meitetsu-Gifu and Meitetsu-Nagoya

== History ==
Hosobata Station opened on January 21, 1926. The station was rebuilt with elevated tracks in December 1979.

== Surrounding area ==
- Japan National Route 156

== See also ==
- List of railway stations in Japan
