= Ogase Station =

Railway station in Kakamigahara, Gifu Prefecture, Japan

Ogase Station 苧ヶ瀬駅

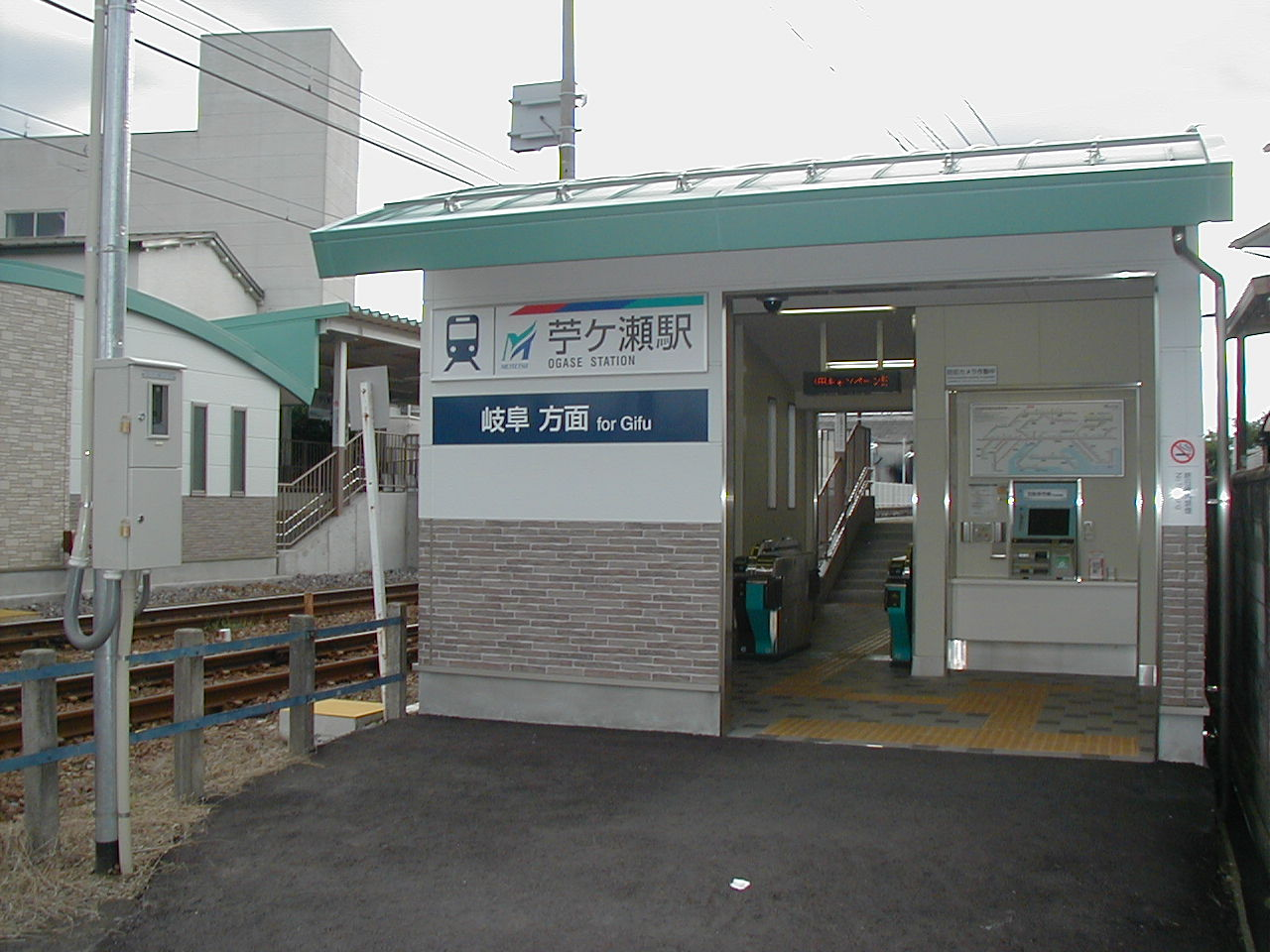
- Ogase Station, December 2007

General information
- Location: 5 Chome Unumakakamigaharachō, Kakamigahara-shi, Gifu-ken 509-0141; Japan
- Coordinates: 35.4035°N 136.9125°E
- Operator: Meitetsu
- Line: ■Meitetsu Kakamigahara Line
- Distance: 14.6 km from Meitetsu-Gifu
- Platforms: 2 side platforms

Other information
- Status: Unstaffed
- Station code: KG03
- Website: Official website (in Japanese)

History
- Opened: September 20, 1927

Passengers
- FY2013: 742

Services
Preceding station	Meitetsu	Following station
Haba towards Shin Unuma	Kakamigahara Line Local	Meiden Kakamigahara towards Meitetsu Gifu
Location
- Location within Gifu Prefecture Location within Japan

Ogase Station (苧ヶ瀬駅, Ogase-eki) is a railway station located in the city of Kakamigahara, Gifu Prefecture, Japan, operated by the private railway operator Meitetsu.

== Lines ==
Ogase Station is a station on the Kakamigahara Line, and is located 14.6 kilometers from the terminus of the line at Meitetsu Gifu.

== Station layout ==
Ogase Station has two ground-level opposed side platforms connected by a level crossing. The station is unattended.

=== Platforms ===
1	■ Meitetsu Kakamigahara Line	For Shin-Unuma, and Inuyama
2	■ Meitetsu Kakamigahara Line	For Mikakino, Meitetsu Gifu and Meitetsu-Nagoya

== History ==
Ogase Station opened on September 20, 1927, as a station of the Kakamigahara Railway (各務原鉄道), a predecessor company of Meitetsu, as the line's construction pushed eastward toward Higashi-Unuma Station, which it reached that same month. Revenue on the newly opened line was weak in its early years, in part due to the effects of the post-war economic slump of the period, and from May 1928 operation of the line was entrusted to the Mino Electric Railway. As one measure intended to boost ridership, the Kakamigahara Railway built a baseball ground, Kakamigahara Stadium, on the east side of Ogase Station; the venue later developed, on land provided by the neighbouring village of Naka, into the Kakamigahara Athletic Ground.

The section of line between Ogase Station and Shin-Unuma Station was double-tracked in March 1964; the overhead line voltage was raised from 600 V to 1,500 V at the same time.

== Surrounding area ==
About a ten-minute walk north of the station is Lake Ogase (苧ヶ瀬池), an irrigation reservoir roughly 2 kilometres in circumference. The lake has long been associated with local legends involving a dragon deity, and its resident carp are traditionally regarded as messengers of that deity; large carp and catfish in the lake can be fed by visitors. Ogase Shrine (苧ヶ瀬神社), associated with the same dragon legend, stands on the lakeshore. A summer festival with a fireworks display is held at the lake each July.

== See also ==
- List of railway stations in Japan
