= Nijikken Station =

Railway station in Kakamigahara, Gifu Prefecture, Japan

Nijikken Station 二十軒駅

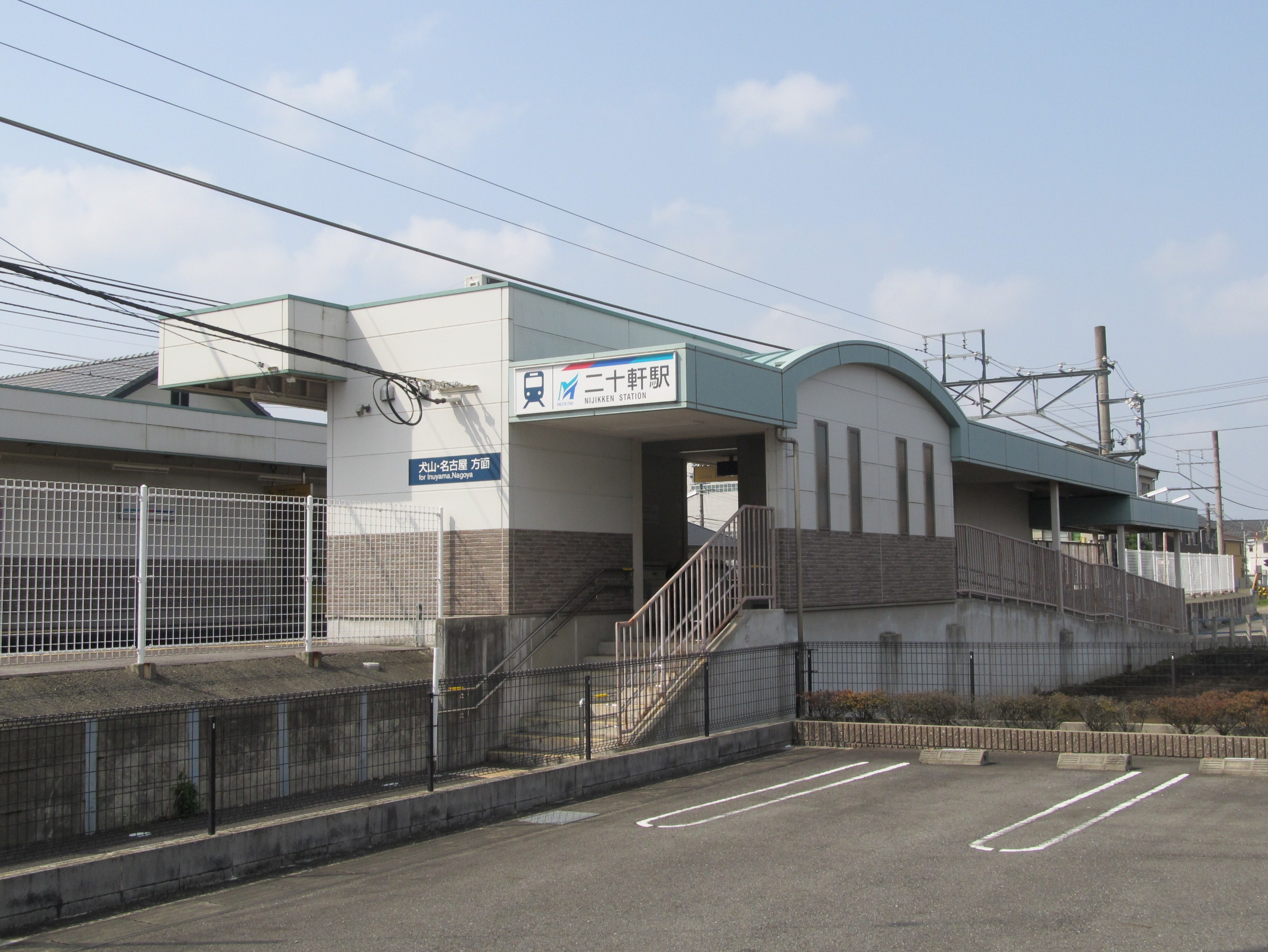
- Nijikken Station, March 2015

General information
- Location: 3 Chome Unumamitsuikechō, Kakamigahara-shi, Gifu-ken 509-0146; Japan
- Coordinates: 35.3999°N 136.8895°E
- Operator: Meitetsu
- Line: ■Meitetsu Kakamigahara Line
- Distance: 12.4 km from Meitetsu-Gifu
- Platforms: 2 side platforms

Other information
- Status: Unstaffed
- Station code: KG05
- Website: Official website (in Japanese)

History
- Opened: August 1, 1926

Passengers
- FY2015: 959

Services
Preceding station	Meitetsu	Following station
Meiden Kakamigahara towards Shin Unuma	Kakamigahara Line Local	Mikakino towards Meitetsu Gifu
Location
- Location within Gifu Prefecture Location within Japan

Nijikken Station (二十軒駅, Nijikken-eki) is a railway station located in the city of Kakamigahara, Gifu Prefecture, Japan, operated by the private railway operator Meitetsu.

== Lines ==
Nijikken Station is a station on the Kakamigahara Line, and is located 12.4 kilometers from the terminus of the line at Meitetsu Gifu.

== Station layout ==
Nijikken Station has two ground-level opposed side platforms connected by a level crossing. The station is unattended.

=== Platforms ===
1	■ Meitetsu Kakamigahara Line	For Shin-Unuma, and Inuyama
2	■ Meitetsu Kakamigahara Line	For Mikakino, Meitetsu Gifu and Meitetsu-Nagoya

== History ==
Nijikken Station opened on August 1, 1926.

== Surrounding area ==
The station is located in a mixed commercial/residential area.

== See also ==
- List of railway stations in Japan
