= Unumajuku Station =

Railway station in Kakamigahara, Gifu Prefecture, Japan

Unumajuku Station 鵜沼宿駅

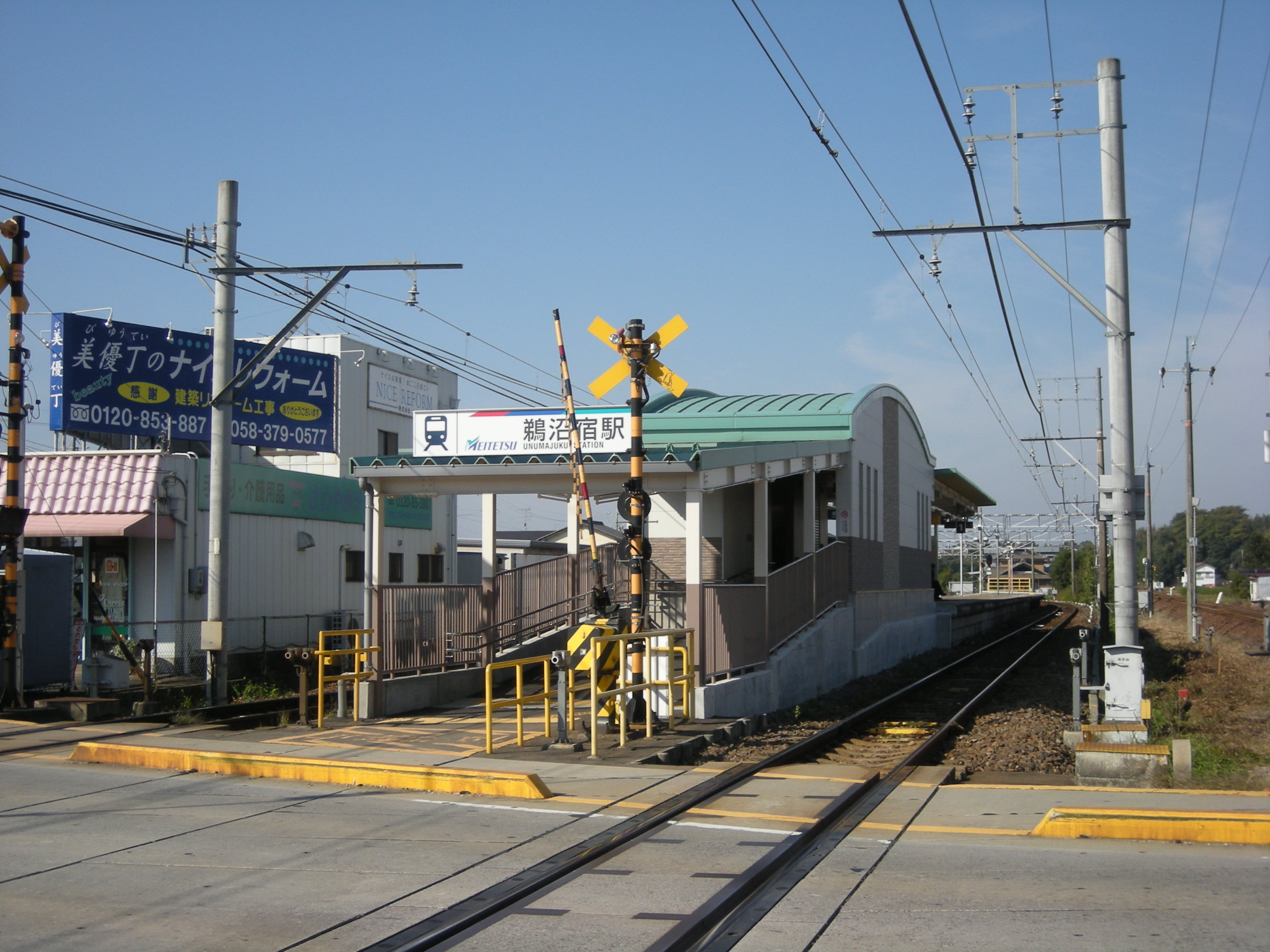
- Unumajuku Station, December 2007

General information
- Location: Unuma Nishimachi 4-chome, Kakamigahara-shi, Gifu-ken 509-0132; Japan
- Coordinates: 35.3998°N 136.9325°E
- Operator: Meitetsu
- Line: ■Meitetsu Kakamigahara Line
- Distance: 16.5 km from Meitetsu-Gifu
- Platforms: 1 island platform

Other information
- Status: Unstaffed
- Station code: KG01
- Website: Official website (in Japanese)

History
- Opened: September 20, 1927

Passengers
- FY2013: 962

Services
Preceding station	Meitetsu	Following station
Shin Unuma Terminus	Kakamigahara Line Local	Haba towards Meitetsu Gifu
Location
- Location within Gifu Prefecture Location within Japan

Unumajuku Station (鵜沼宿駅, Unumajuku-eki) is a railway station located in the city of Kakamigahara, Gifu Prefecture, Japan, operated by the private railway operator Meitetsu.

== Lines ==
Unumajuku Station is on the Kakamigahara Line, and is located 16.5 kilometers from the terminus of the line at Meitetsu Gifu.

== Station layout ==
Unumajuku Station has one ground-level island platform connected to the station building by a level crossing. The station is unattended.

=== Platforms ===
1	■ Meitetsu Kakamigahara Line	For Shin-Unuma, and Inuyama
2	■ Meitetsu Kakamigahara Line	For Mikakino, Meitetsu Gifu and Meitetsu-Nagoya

== History ==
Unumajuku Station opened on September 20, 1927.

== Surrounding area ==
- Kakaigahara Public Swimming Pool

== See also ==
- List of railway stations in Japan
