= Kiridōshi Station =

Railway station in Gifu, Gifu Prefecture, Japan

Coordinates: 35.4001°N 136.7955°E

Kiridōshi Station 切通駅

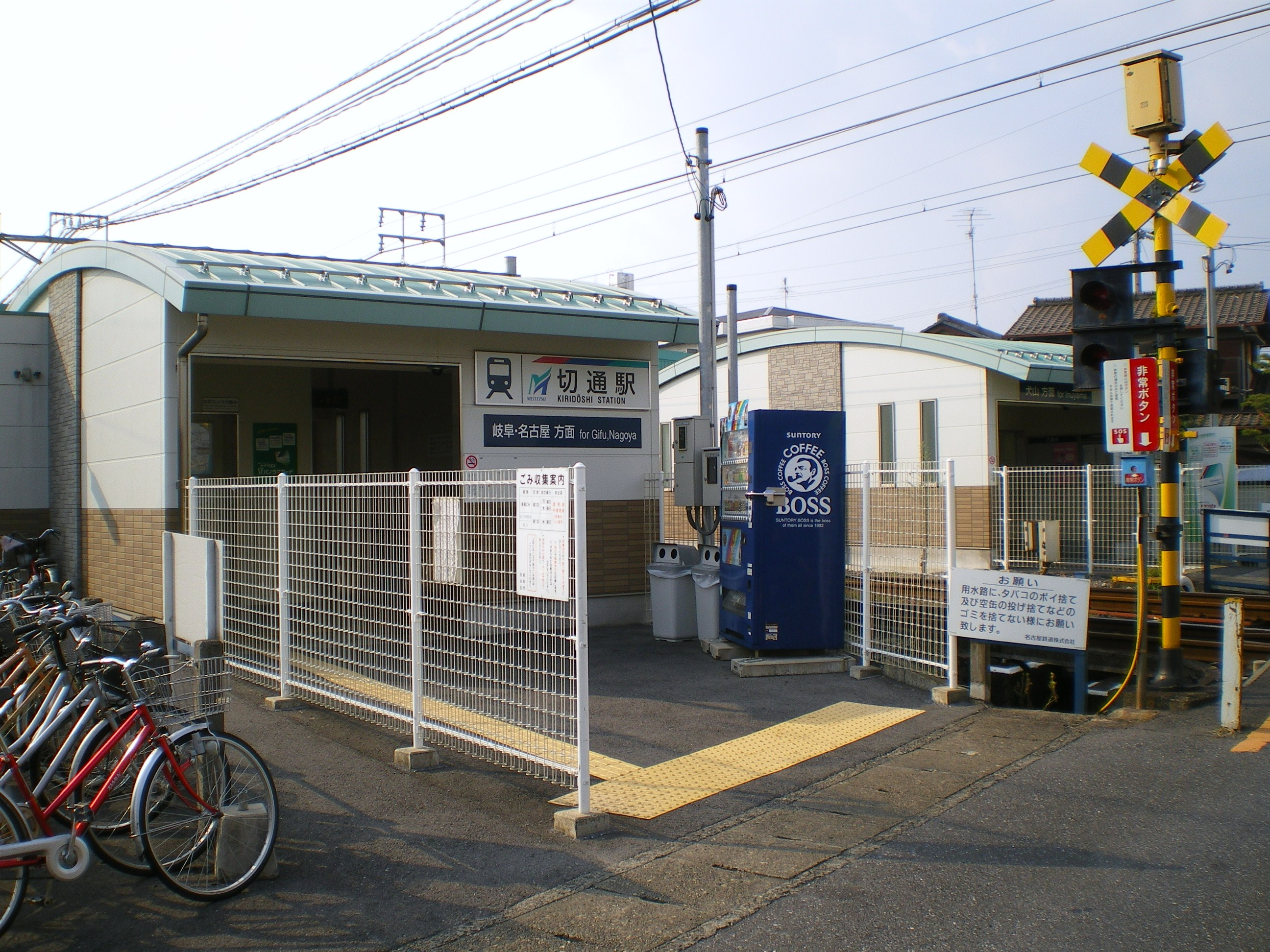
- Kiridōshi Station, July 2017

General information
- Location: 2-17 Kiridoshi, Gifu-shi, Gifu-ken 500-8237; Japan
- Operator: Meitetsu
- Line: ■Meitetsu Kakamigahara Line
- Distance: 3.9 km from Meitetsu Gifu
- Platforms: 2 side platforms

Other information
- Status: Unstaffed
- Station code: KG14
- Website: Official website (in Japanese)

History
- Opened: January 21, 1926

Passengers
- FY2013: 1587

Services
Preceding station	Meitetsu	Following station
Shin Naka towards Shin Unuma	Kakamigahara Line Rapid Express Express	Meitetsu Gifu Terminus
Tejikara towards Shin Unuma	Kakamigahara Line Local	Hosobatake towards Meitetsu Gifu
Location
- Location within Japan

Kiridōshi Station (切通駅, Kiridōshi-eki) is a railway station located in the city of Gifu, Gifu Prefecture, Japan, operated by the private railway operator Meitetsu.

== Lines ==
Kiridōshi Station is a station on the Kakamigahara Line, and is located 3.9 kilometers from the terminus of the line at Meitetsu Gifu.

== Station layout ==
track layout

Kiridōshi Station has two ground-level opposed side platforms connected by a level crossing. The station is unattended.

=== Platforms ===
1	■ Meitetsu Kakamigahara Line	For Mikakino, Shin-Unuma, and Inuyama
2	■ Meitetsu Kakamigahara Line	For Meitetsu Gifu and Meitetsu-Nagoya

== History ==
Kiridōshi Station opened on January 21, 1926.

== Surrounding area ==
- Gifu Women's High School
- Nagamori-Minami Elementary School

== See also ==
- List of railway stations in Japan
