= Tagami Station (Gifu) =

Railway station in Gifu, Gifu Prefecture, Japan

Tagami Station 田神駅

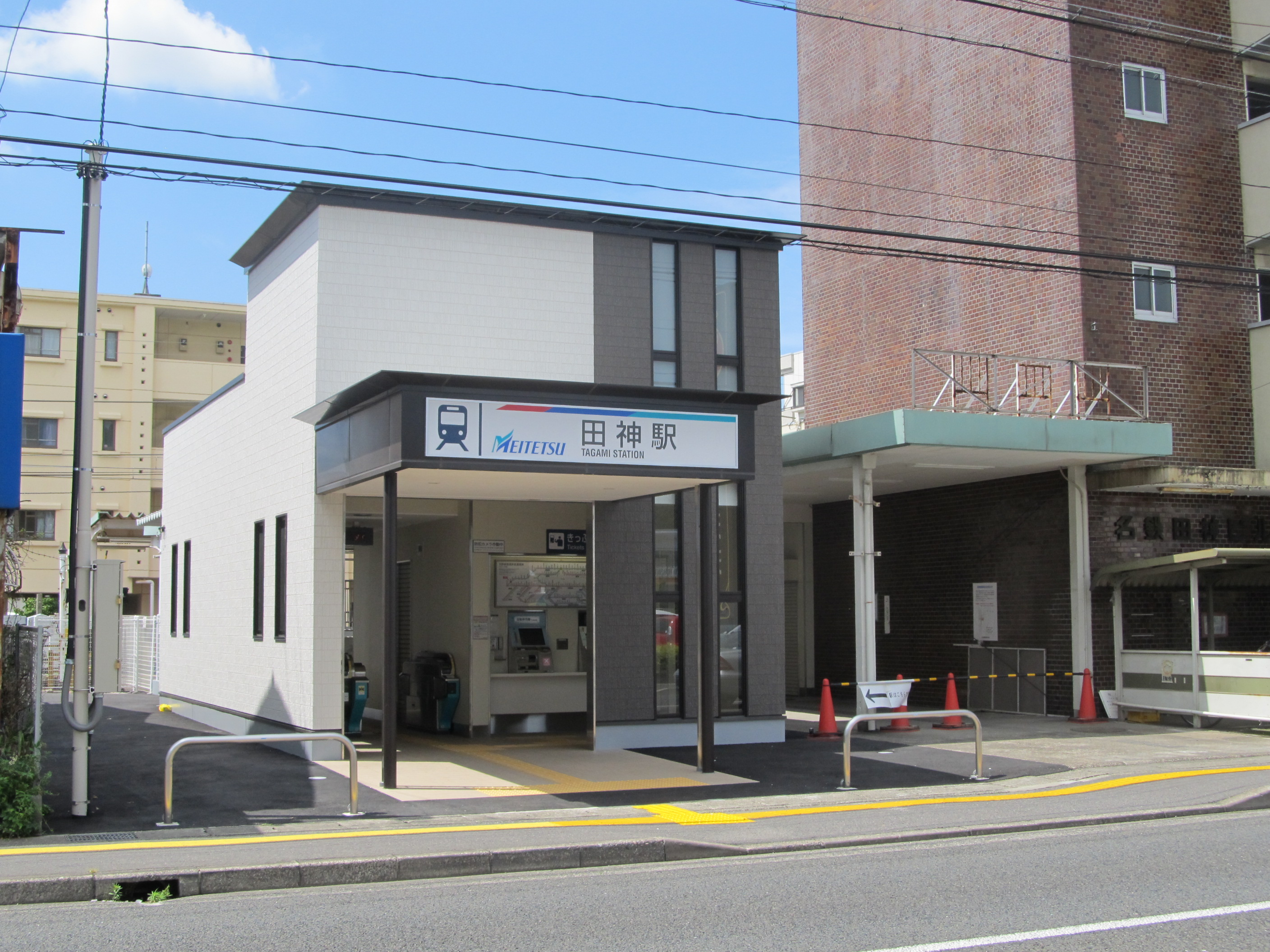
- Tagami Station, June 2014

General information
- Location: 1-22-1 Irifune-cho, Gifu-shi, Gifu-ken 500-815; Japan
- Coordinates: 35.4118°N 136.7715°E
- Operator: Meitetsu
- Line: ■ Kakamigahara Line
- Distance: 1.1 km from Meitetsu-Gifu
- Platforms: 2 side platforms

Other information
- Status: Unstaffed
- Station code: KG16
- Website: Official website (in Japanese)

History
- Opened: January 21, 1926

Passengers
- FY2013: 2607

Services
Preceding station	Meitetsu	Following station
Hosobata towards Shin Unuma	Kakamigahara Line Local	Meitetsu Gifu Terminus
Location
- Location within Japan

Tagami Station (田神駅, Tagami-eki) is a railway station located in the city of Gifu, Gifu Prefecture, Japan, operated by the private railway operator Meitetsu.

== Lines ==
Tagami Station is a station on the Kakamigahara Line, and is located 1.1 kilometers from the terminus of the line at Meitetsu-Gifu.

== Station layout ==
track layout

Tagami Station has two ground-level opposed side platforms connected by a level crossing. The station is unattended.

=== Platforms ===
1	■ Meitetsu Kakamigahara Line	For Mikakino, Shin-Unuma, and Inuyama
2	■ Meitetsu Kakamigahara Line	For Meitetsu-Gifu and Meitetsu-Nagoya

== History ==
Tagami Station opened on January 21, 1926.

== Surrounding area ==
- Gifu Velodrome
- Bairin Park

== See also ==
- List of railway stations in Japan
