= Rokken Station (Gifu) =

Railway station in Kakamigahara, Gifu Prefecture, Japan

Rokken Station 六軒駅

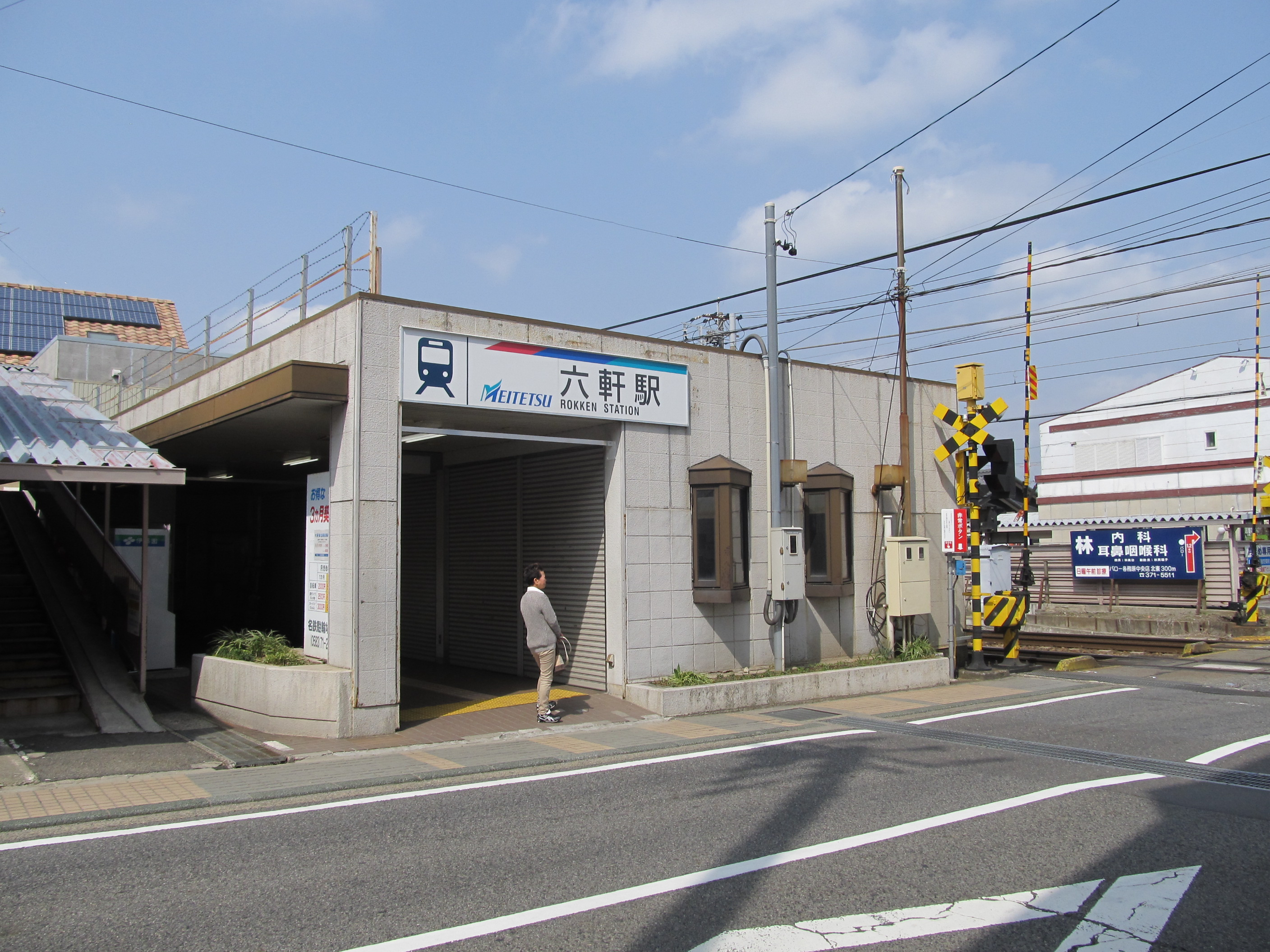
- Rokken Station, July 2017

General information
- Location: 4-Chome Sohararokkenchō, Kakamigahara-shi, Gifu-ken 504-0905; Japan
- Coordinates: 35.4010°N 136.8620°E
- Operator: Meitetsu
- Line: ■Meitetsu Kakamigahara Line
- Distance: 9.9 km from Meitetsu-Gifu
- Platforms: 2 side platforms

Other information
- Status: Unstaffed
- Station code: KG07
- Website: Official website (in Japanese)

History
- Opened: January 21, 1926
- Former names: Hikōdanmae Station (1937-1938)

Passengers
- FY2013: 2515

Services
Preceding station	Meitetsu	Following station
Mikakino towards Shin Unuma	Kakamigahara Line Rapid Express Express Local	Kakamigahara Shiyakusho-mae towards Meitetsu Gifu
Location
- Location within Gifu Prefecture Location within Japan

Rokken Station (六軒駅, Rokken-eki) is a railway station located in the city of Kakamigahara, Gifu Prefecture, Japan, operated by the private railway operator Meitetsu.

== Lines ==
Rokken Station is a station on the Kakamigahara Line, and is located 9.9 kilometers from the terminus of the line at Meitetsu Gifu.

== Station layout ==
Rokken Station has two ground-level opposed side platforms connected by a level crossing. The station is unattended.

=== Platforms ===
1	■ Meitetsu Kakamigahara Line	For Mikakino, Shin-Unuma, and Inuyama
2	■ Meitetsu Kakamigahara Line	For Meitetsu Gifu and Meitetsu-Nagoya

== History ==
Rokken Station opened on January 21, 1926, as Rokuken Station (六軒駅). It was renamed Hikōdanmae Station (飛行団前駅) on October 1, 1937, but renamed to its present name on December 1, 1938.

== Surrounding area ==
- Gifu Air Field

== See also ==
- List of railway stations in Japan
