= Rokken Station =

Rokken Station (六軒駅) is the name of two train stations in Japan:

- Rokken Station (Gifu)
- Rokken Station (Mie)
