= Meiden Kakamigahara Station =

Railway station in Kakamigahara, Gifu Prefecture, Japan

Meiden Kakamigahara Station 名電各務原駅

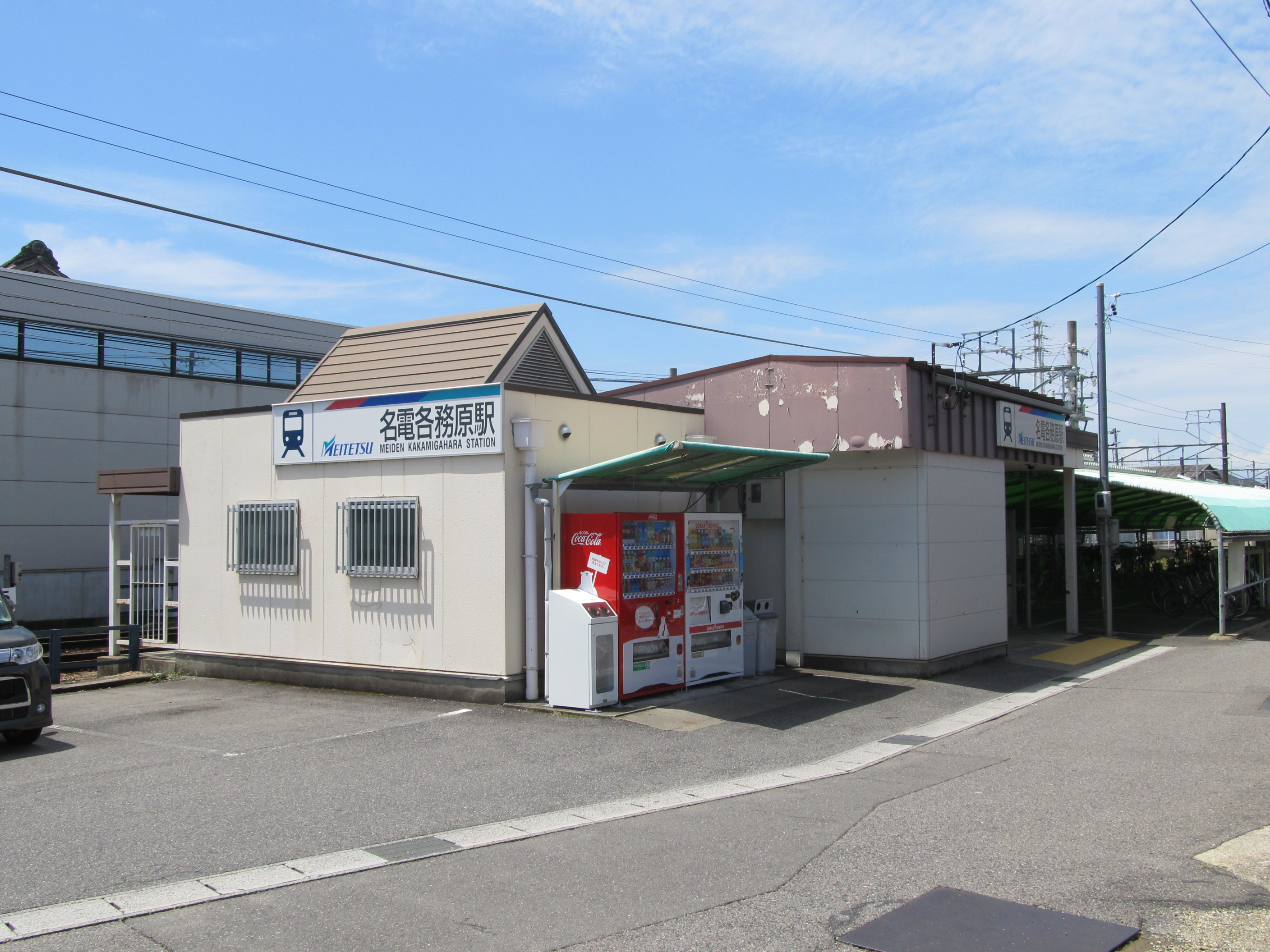
- Meiden Kakamigahara Station, August 2010

General information
- Location: 3 Chome Unumakakamigaharachō,, Kakamigahara-shi, Gifu-ken 509-0141; Japan
- Coordinates: 35.4028°N 136.9008°E
- Operator: Meitetsu
- Line: ■Meitetsu Kakamigahara Line
- Distance: 13.7 km from Meitetsu-Gifu
- Platforms: 2 side platforms

Other information
- Status: Staffed
- Station code: KG04
- Website: Official website (in Japanese)

History
- Opened: January 21, 1926
- Former names: Nirentai-mae Station (to 1938)

Passengers
- FY2015: 3313

Services
Preceding station	Meitetsu	Following station
Shin Unuma Terminus	Kakamigahara Line Rapid Express Express	Mikakino towards Meitetsu Gifu
Ogase towards Shin Unuma	Kakamigahara Line Local	Nijikken towards Meitetsu Gifu
Location
- Location within Gifu Prefecture Location within Japan

Meiden Kakamigahara Station (名電各務原駅, Meiden Kakamigahara-eki) is a railway station located in the city of Kakamigahara, Gifu Prefecture, Japan, operated by the private railway operator Meitetsu.

== Lines ==
Meiden Kakamigahara Station is a station on the Kakamigahara Line, and is located 13.7 kilometers from the terminus of the line at Meitetsu Gifu.

== Station layout ==
Meiden Kakamigahara Station has two ground-level opposed side platforms connected by a level crossing. The station is unattended.

=== Platforms ===
1	■ Meitetsu Kakamigahara Line	For Shin-Unuma, and Inuyama
2	■ Meitetsu Kakamigahara Line	For Mikakino, Meitetsu Gifu and Meitetsu-Nagoya

== History ==
Meiden Kakamigahara Station opened on January 21, 1926 as Nirentai-mae Station (二聯隊前駅). It was renamed Meiden Kagamihara Station (名電各務原駅) on December 1, 1938. From October 1, 1965, the station has used the present transliteration of its name.

== Surrounding area ==
- Kagamigahara Station (JR Central Takayama Main Line)
- National Route 21

== See also ==
- List of railway stations in Japan
