= Sohara Station =

Sohara Station is the name of two train stations in Japan:

- Sohara Station (Gifu) (蘇原駅)
- Sohara Station (Mie) (楚原駅)
