= Tokai Gakuin University =

Private university in Nakakirino cho, Kakamigahara, Gifu Prefecture, Japan

Coordinates: 35°25′26.1″N 136°49′6.1″E

- 東海学院大学
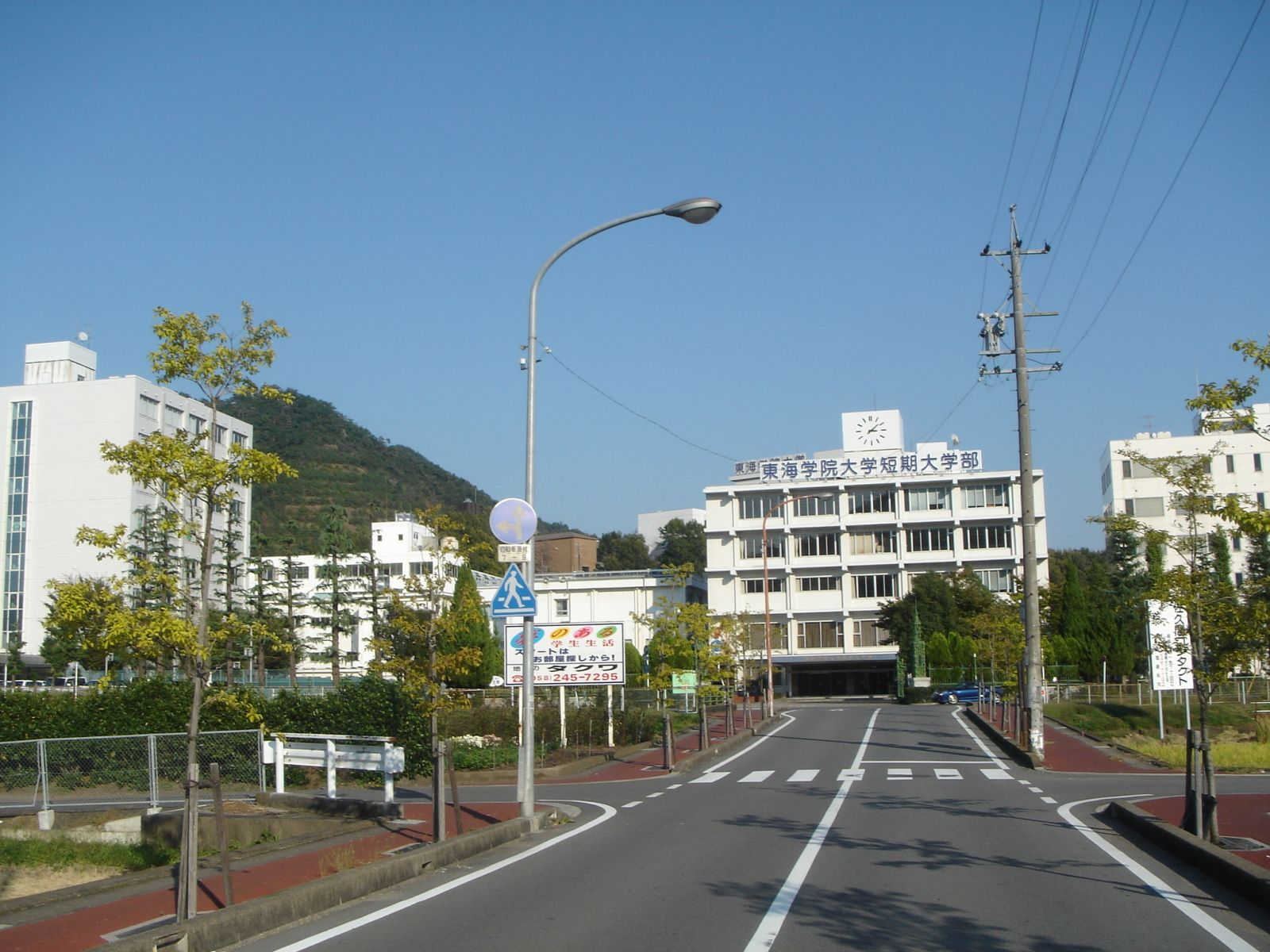
- Tokai Gakuin University in 2008
- Type: Private
- Location: Kakamigahara, Gifu, Japan
- Website: http://www.tokaigakuin-u.ac.jp/daigaku/

Tokai Gakuin University (東海学院大学, Tōkai Gakuin Daigaku) is a private university in Nakakirino cho, Kakamigahara, Gifu Prefecture, Japan. The predecessor of the school, founded in 1961, was chartered as Tokai Women's College (東海女子大学, Tōkai Joshi Daigaku) in 1981. In 2007, the school adopted the present name.
