= Kakamigahara =

Kakamigahara 各務原市
- City
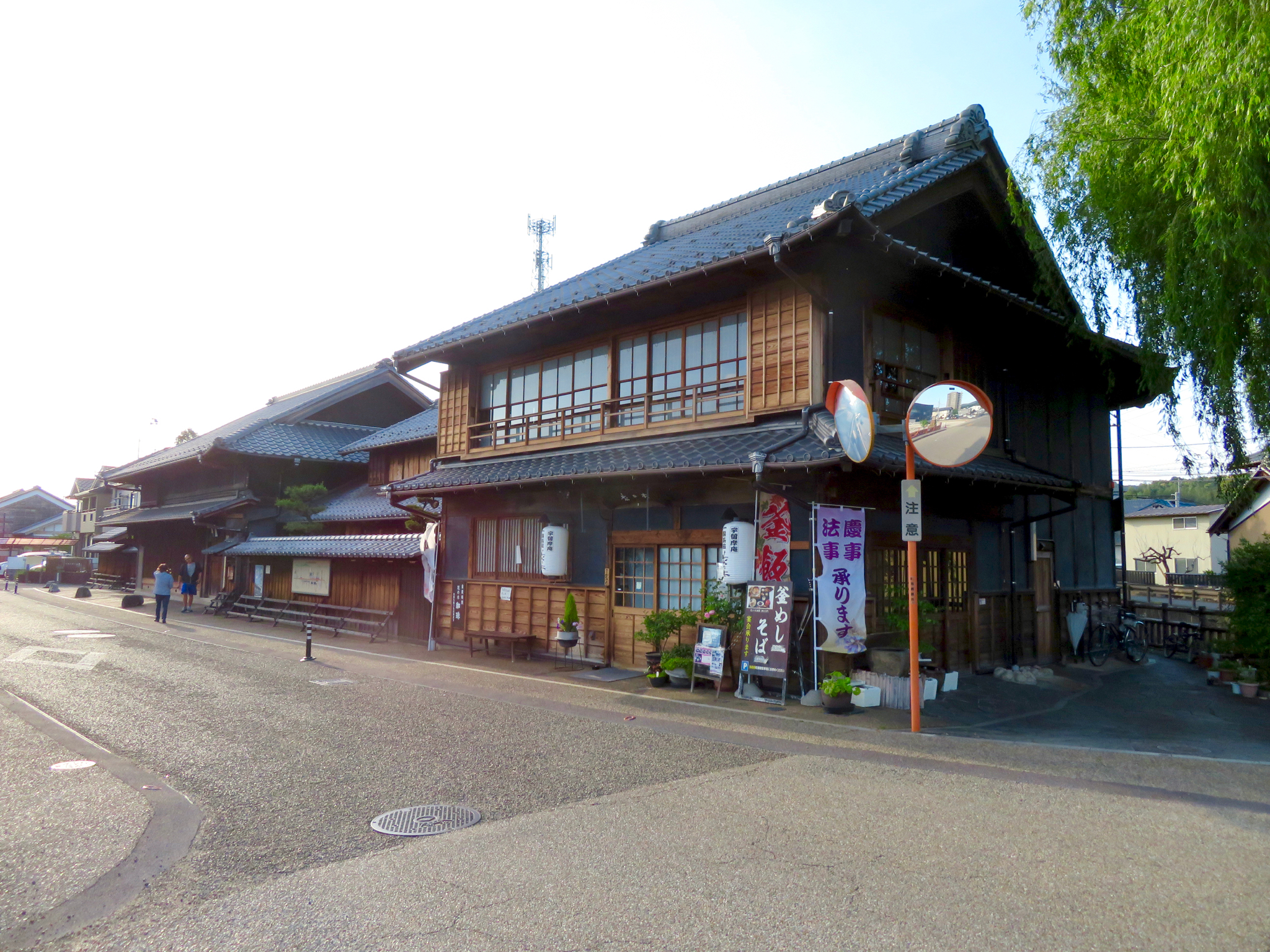
- Unuma-juku

- Flag Seal

- Location of Kakamigahara in Gifu Prefecture

- Coordinates: 35°23′55.7″N 136°50′54.3″E
- Country: Japan
- Region: Chūbu
- Prefecture: Gifu

Government
  - Mayor: Kenji Asano (since May 2013)

Area
  - Total: 87.81 km^{2} (33.90 sq mi)

Population (1 January 2019)
  - Total: 148,225
  - Density: 1,688/km^{2} (4,372/sq mi)
- Time zone: UTC+9 (Japan Standard Time)
- City symbols
- Tree: Pine
- Flower: Azalea
- Phone number: 058-383-1111
- Address: 1–69 Nakasakura-machi, Kakamigahara-shi, Gifu-ken 504-8555
- Website: Official website

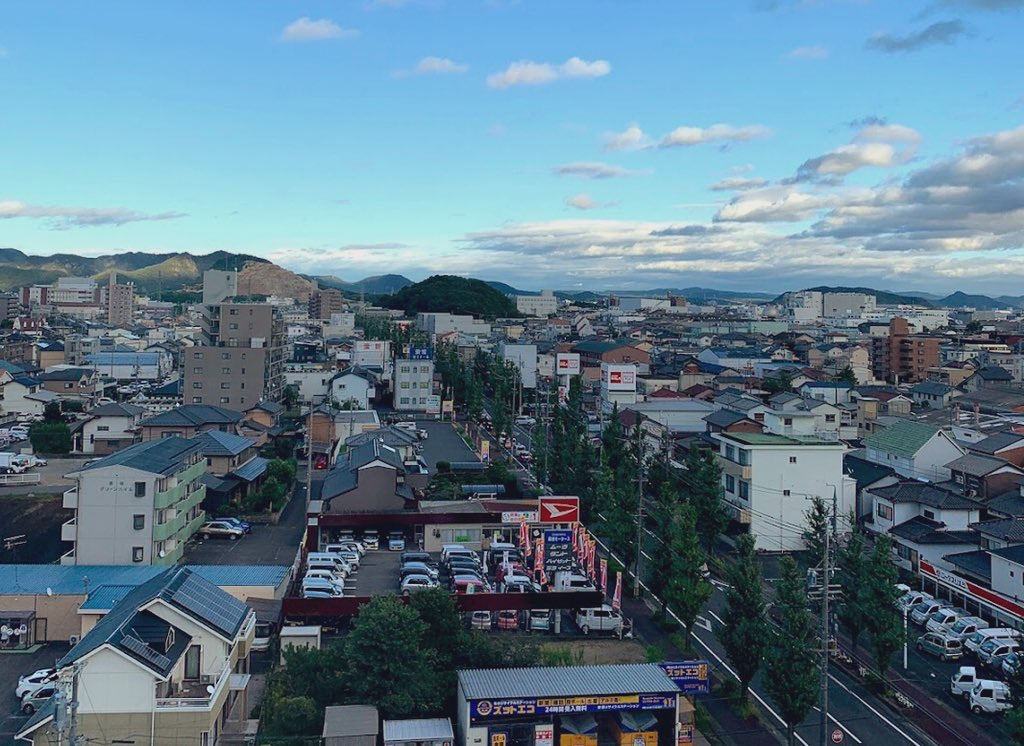
Skyline of Kakamigahara

Kakamigahara (各務原市, Kakamigahara-shi) is a city located in southern Gifu Prefecture in Japan. As of 1 January 2019, the city had an estimated population of 148,225, and a population density of 1700 persons per km^{2}, in 59,736 households. The total area of the city was 87.81 km^{2} (33.90 sq mi).

Situated in the northern part of the Nōbi Plain, what is now Kakamigahara originally thrived as a post station on the Nakasendō highway connecting Edo with Kyoto, being called "Unuma-juku" at the time. In more recent history, the city developed due to the JASDF Gifu base. In addition, Kakamigahara grew as an industrial city and a commuter suburb of Gifu City and Nagoya.

The city of Kakamigahara has many large parks, the most notable among them being "Kakamigahara Kōen", which was originally made from a vacant lot owned by Gifu University. A city planning policy of making Kakamigahara into a "park city" has been undertaken by the municipality, and in 2005, the city received the Green City Prize from the prime minister. Although the city was officially named Kakamigahara, it is also called Kakamihara, Kagamihara, or Kagamigahara by tradition.

== Geography ==
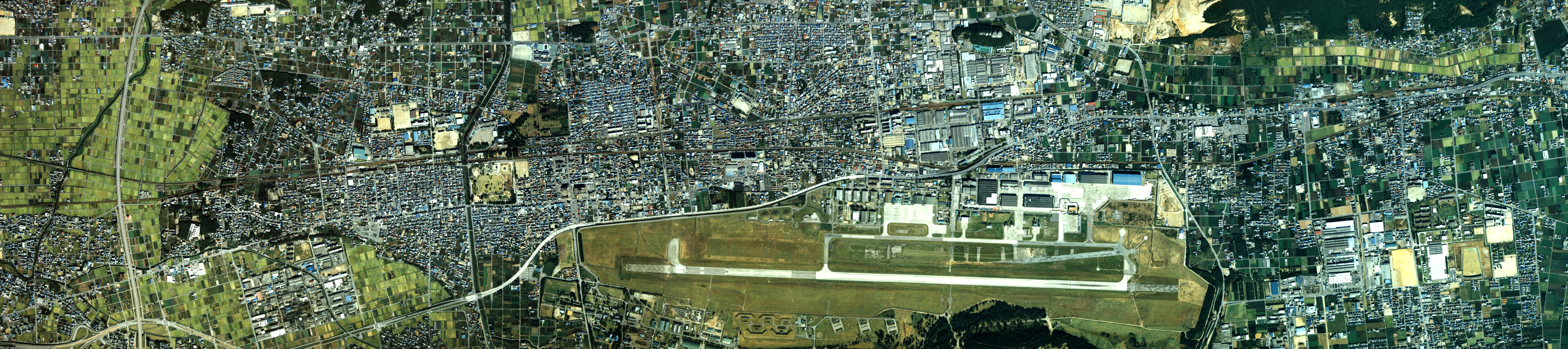
Aerial photograph from 1987 of Kakamigahara City Center: The JASDF Gifu Airbase is located on the south side of the city center.

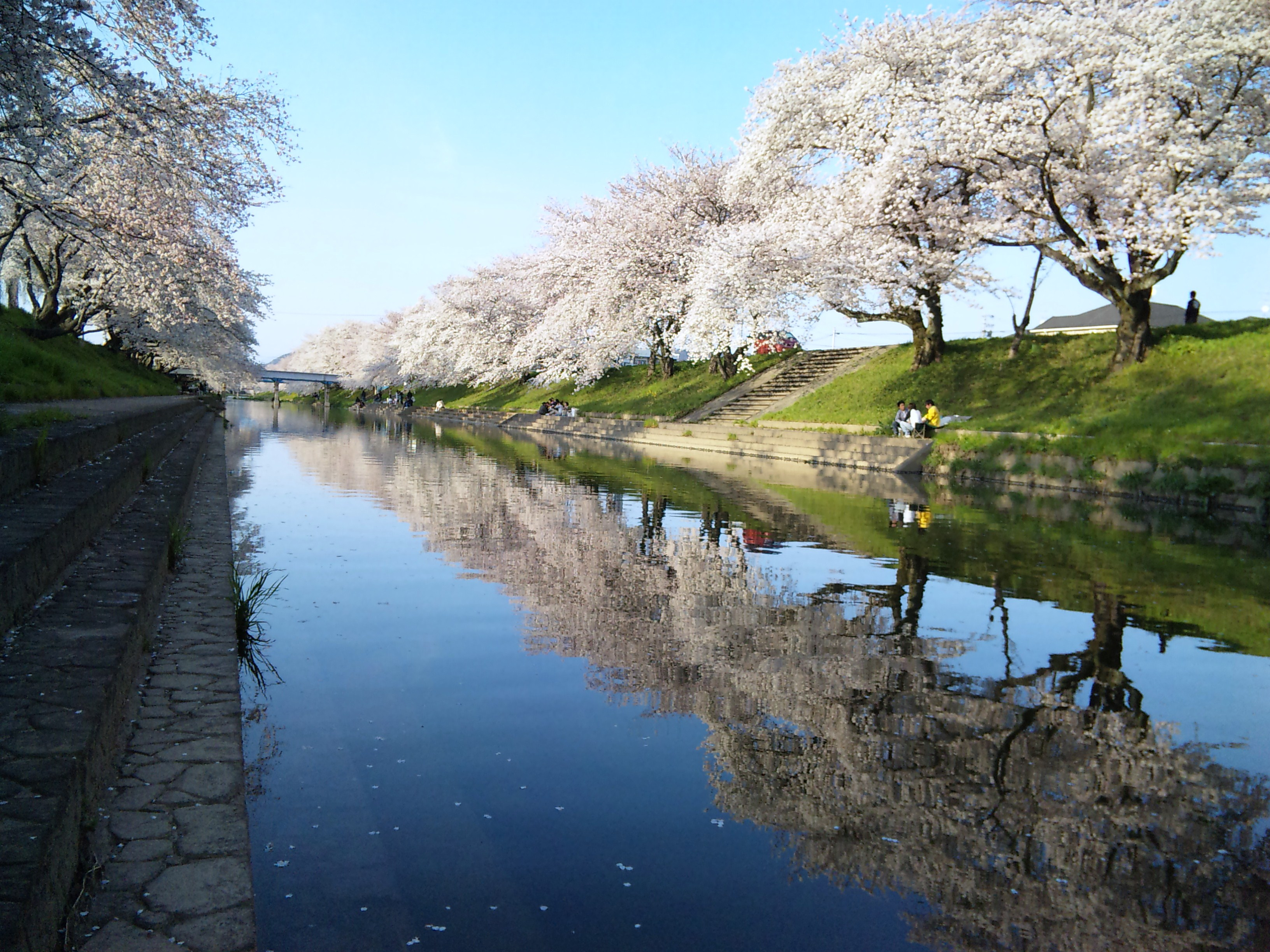
The banks of the Shin-Sakai River in spring

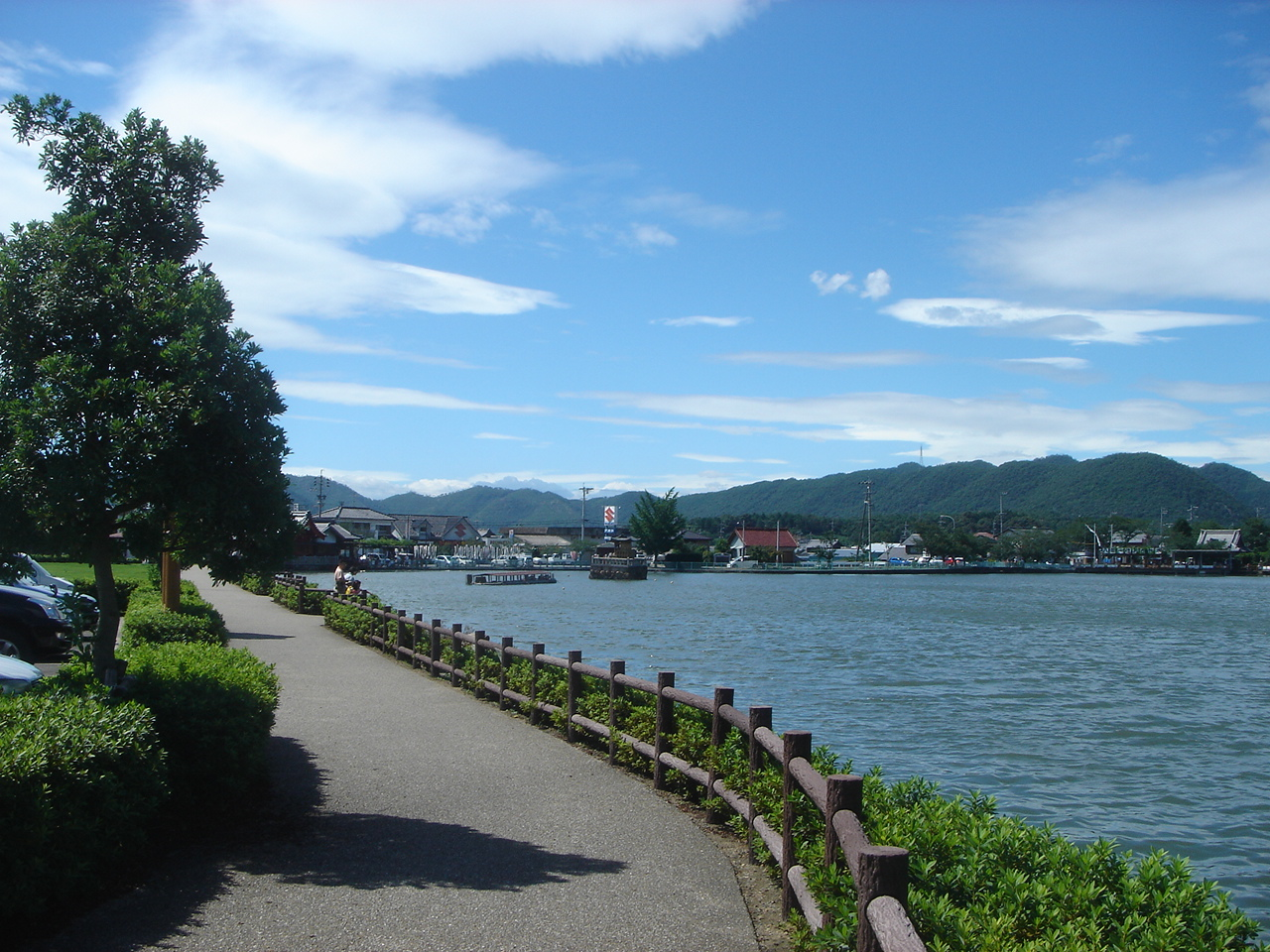
Ogase Reservoir

Mountainous terrain runs from the northern to the eastern part of the city. The Kiso River flows through the southern part, forming the municipal and prefectural (Aichi-Gifu) border. A large portion of the city is situated on the Kakamigahara Plateau. Because the soil is very well drained, it was not traditionally suited to rice cultivation. Except for rest stops such as Unuma-juku or other roadside settlements, though, the area was largely wilderness until the Meiji period. The names of the Meitetsu train stations, Rokken, Nijukken, and the Ogase Reservoir are from that era. Beginning from the Meiji period, to take advantage of the large amount of wilderness and well-drained soil, military bases and training grounds were established. In addition, Gifu University's agricultural and engineering departments were established in the area, leading the growth of machine and textile factories. These industries, in addition to carrot production, which used the dry soil, became the main industries of the town. Part of the city is within the borders of the Hida-Kisogawa Quasi-National Park.

=== Mountains ===
- Kakamigahara Alps
- Mount Gongen
- Mount Igi
- Mount Kakami
- Mount Mii

=== Rivers ===
Kiso, Sakai, Shin-Sakai, Daianji

=== Lakes ===
Ogase Reservoir

=== Adjacent cities and districts ===
North: Seki

East: Kamo District (Sakahogi-cho)

West: Gifu City, Hashima District (Kasamatsu-cho, Ginan-cho)

South: Ichinomiya, Konan, Inuyama, Niwa District ( Fusou-cho)

=== Climate ===
The city has a climate characterized by hot and humid summers, and mild winters (Köppen climate classification Cfa). The average annual temperature in Kakamigahara is 15.5 °C. The average annual rainfall is 1939 mm, with September as the wettest month. The temperatures are highest on average in August, at around 27.9 °C, and lowest in January, at around 3.9 °C.

== History ==
The area around Kakamigahara was part of traditional Mino Province. During the post-Meiji restoration cadastral reforms, the area was organised into the Inaba District, Gifu, in April 1897.

1 April 1963: Kakamigahara City was founded by amalgamating Naka, Sohara, Unuma, and Inaba.

1968: The Line Bridge was completed. Together with the Inuyama bridge, completed in 1925, these two bridges span the Kiso River and connect Kakamigahara City with Aichi Prefecture.

1969: The Aigi bridge was completed. This was the third bridge to span the Kiso, and connects the city to Aichi Prefecture. It was the first bridge to connect Kakamigahara to Konan City.

5 March 1986: The section of the Tokai-Hokuriku Expressway between Kakamigahara Junction and Mino Junction was opened. Furthermore, on 13 December 1998, the Tokai-Hokuriku Expressway was connected to the Meishin Expressway (Ichinomiya Junction).

28 March 2000: The twinning of the Inuyama Bridge was completed. Previously, Meitetsu trains had shared the bridge with automobiles, crossing the bridge in a manner similar to streetcars. After the twinning, the trains began to use the old Inuyama Bridge. This separation of trains and automobiles improved transportation across the river.

1 November 2004: Kawashima-cho (Hashima District), was incorporated into Kakamigahara City.

5 November 2006: The Shin-mei Ko-ami Bridge, connecting to Konan, is completed.

24 March 2013: Kakamigahara Bridge is completed. It connects the city hall area with Kawashima-chiku (formerly Kawashima-cho) of Konan City. With the completion of this bridge, there are now four routes from Kakamigahara City into Aichi Prefecture.

== Demographics ==
Per Japanese census data, the population of Kakamigahara has recently plateaued after a long period of growth.

Historical population
Year	Pop.	±%
1920	28,484	—
1930	32,140	+12.8%
1940	43,926	+36.7%
1950	60,126	+36.9%
1960	63,021	+4.8%
1970	84,664	+34.3%
1980	122,317	+44.5%
1990	138,264	+13.0%
2000	141,765	+2.5%
2010	145,604	+2.7%
2020	144,521	−0.7%
Source: 各務原, Kakamigahara population statistics

As of December 2013, about 3,000 residents of foreign nationality were registered in Kakamigahara City. The largest numbers are, in descending order, from Brazil, China, and the Philippines.

== Government ==
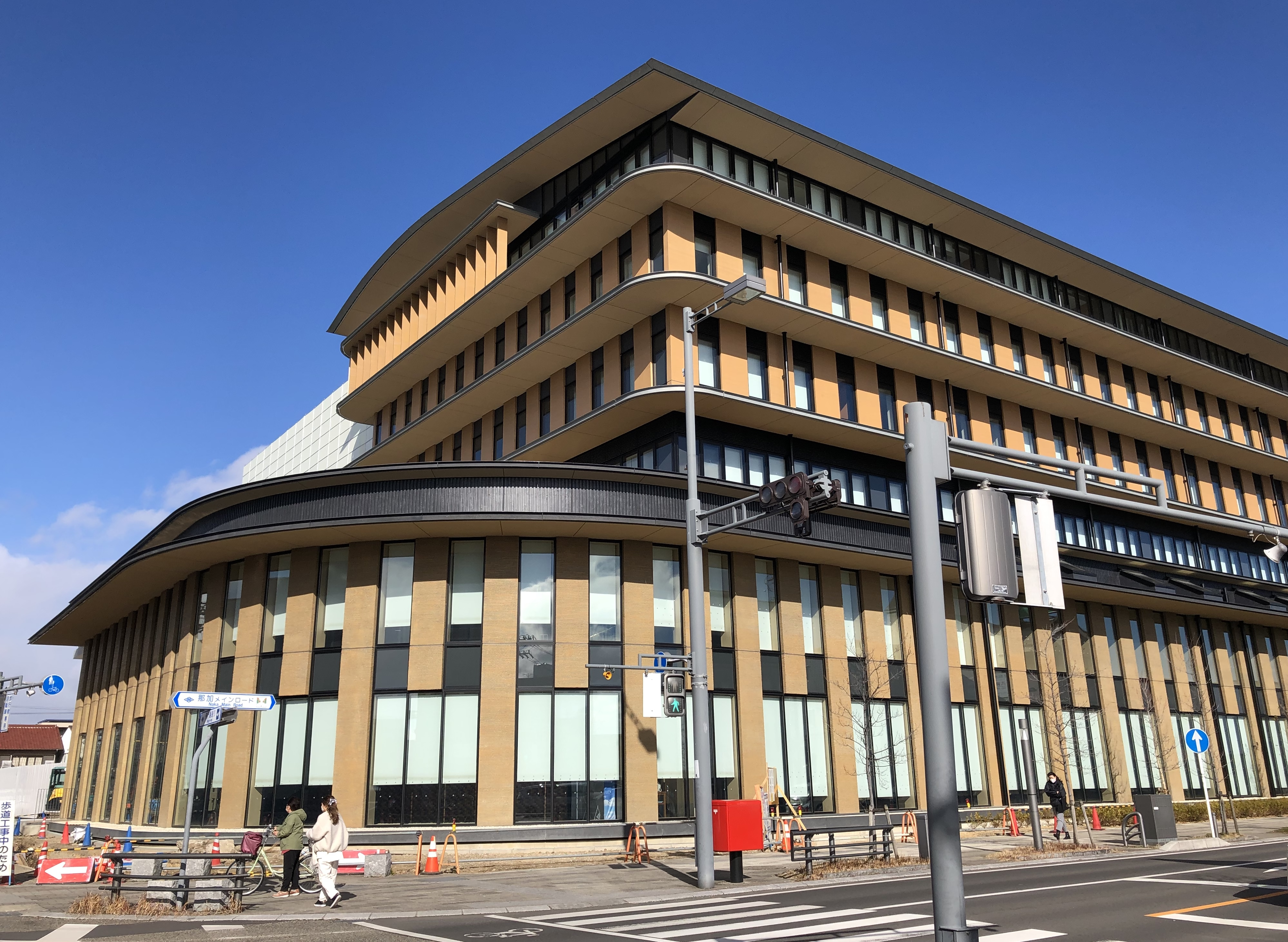
Kakamigahara City Hall

=== Politics ===
Kakamigahara has a mayor-council form of government with a directly elected mayor and a unicameral city legislature of 24 members.

- Current mayor: Kenji Asano (inaugurated 20 May 2013, first term)
- Previous mayors:
  - Kaichi Mutou - 1963–1968, resigned during the second term due to illness
  - Keikichi Matsubara - 1968–1973, resigned during second term due to corruption scandal
  - Kihachirou Hirano - 1973–1997, served six terms
  - Shin Mori - 1997-2013, served four terms

== Economy ==
Kakamigahara City is second in Gifu Prefecture in terms of industrial production. The city has an aircraft factory operated by Kawasaki Heavy Industries Aerospace Company, located next to the JASDF Gifu Air Base, and Mitsubishi Heavy Industries also produces aircraft parts. The city also has many automobile-related factories, including parts makers and metalworking industries. In Sue-cho in the north of Kakamigahara City, an industrial park called Techno Plaza was established by the Gifu Prefectural government as a focal point for the research and development of robotics and virtual reality. With Waseda University's WABOT-HOUSE laboratory and Gifu University's Science and Technology Promotion Center as a nucleus, Techno Plaza is structured as an industrial and R&D center. Many ventures have moved into the park, including some companies that have made IPOs, such as Nippon Ichi Software, Inc.

=== Major employers ===
- Calbee (Kakamigahara factory): This factory produces Kakamigahara kimchi-flavored potato chips, which are exclusive to this region.
- Gifu Auto Body Industries
- Eisai Co.
- Kawasaki Heavy Industries Aerospace Company
- Nakanihon Diecast Co.
- Nippon Ichi Software
- Taikou Seikou Co.
- Tenryu Industries Co.
- Zero Sports (Zero Max)

== Educational institutions ==
=== Universities and colleges ===
- Chubu Gakuin University
- Tokai Gakuin University

=== High schools ===
The city has three public high schools operated by the Gifu Prefectural Board of Education.

- Gifu Prefectural Kakamihara Senior High School (岐阜県立各務原高等学校 - 岐阜県立各務原高等学校) (academic)
- Gifu Prefectural Kakamigahara Nishi Senior High School (岐阜県立各務原西高等学校 - 岐阜県立各務原西高等学校) (academic)
- Gifu Prefectural Gifu-Kakamino High School (岐阜県立岐阜各務野高等学校 - 岐阜県立岐阜各務野高等学校) (technical)

=== Primary and secondary schools ===
Kakimigahara has 16 public elementary schools and eight public junior high schools operated by the city government. The city also operates one special-education school.

=== International schools ===
- Centro Educacional Nova Etapa - CENE (セントロ・エドカショナル・ノヴァ・エターパ - セントロ・エドカショナル・ノヴァ・エターパ) - Brazilian school

== Transportation ==
=== Railways ===
- Central Japan Railway Company - Takayama Main Line
  - Naka - Sohara - Kagamigahara - Unuma
- Meitetsu - Meitetsu Kakamigahara Line
  - Shin Kanō - Shin Naka -Shiminkōen-mae - Kakamigahara-Shiyakusho-mae - Rokken - Mikakino- Nijikken - Meiden Kakamigahara - Ogase - Haba - Unumajuku
- Meitetsu - Meitetsu Inuyama Line
  - Shin-Unuma

=== Highways ===
- Tōkai-Hokuriku Expressway Gifu-Kakamigahara IC
- National Route 21

=== Bridges ===
- Aigi Ohashi Bridge crosses the Kiso River into Inuyama in Aichi Prefecture.

== In popular culture ==
The city has been the setting for several popular culture productions.

- Dragon Pilot: Hisone and Masotan
- The Wind Rises

== Other ==
- JASDF Gifu Air Base was established as an army airfield in 1917, and is currently used by the JSDF for aircraft and flight testing. During World War II, in 1945, the base was targeted in an American air raid.From 1945 to 1958, it was occupied by the U.S. military and known as "Camp Gifu".

== Local attractions ==
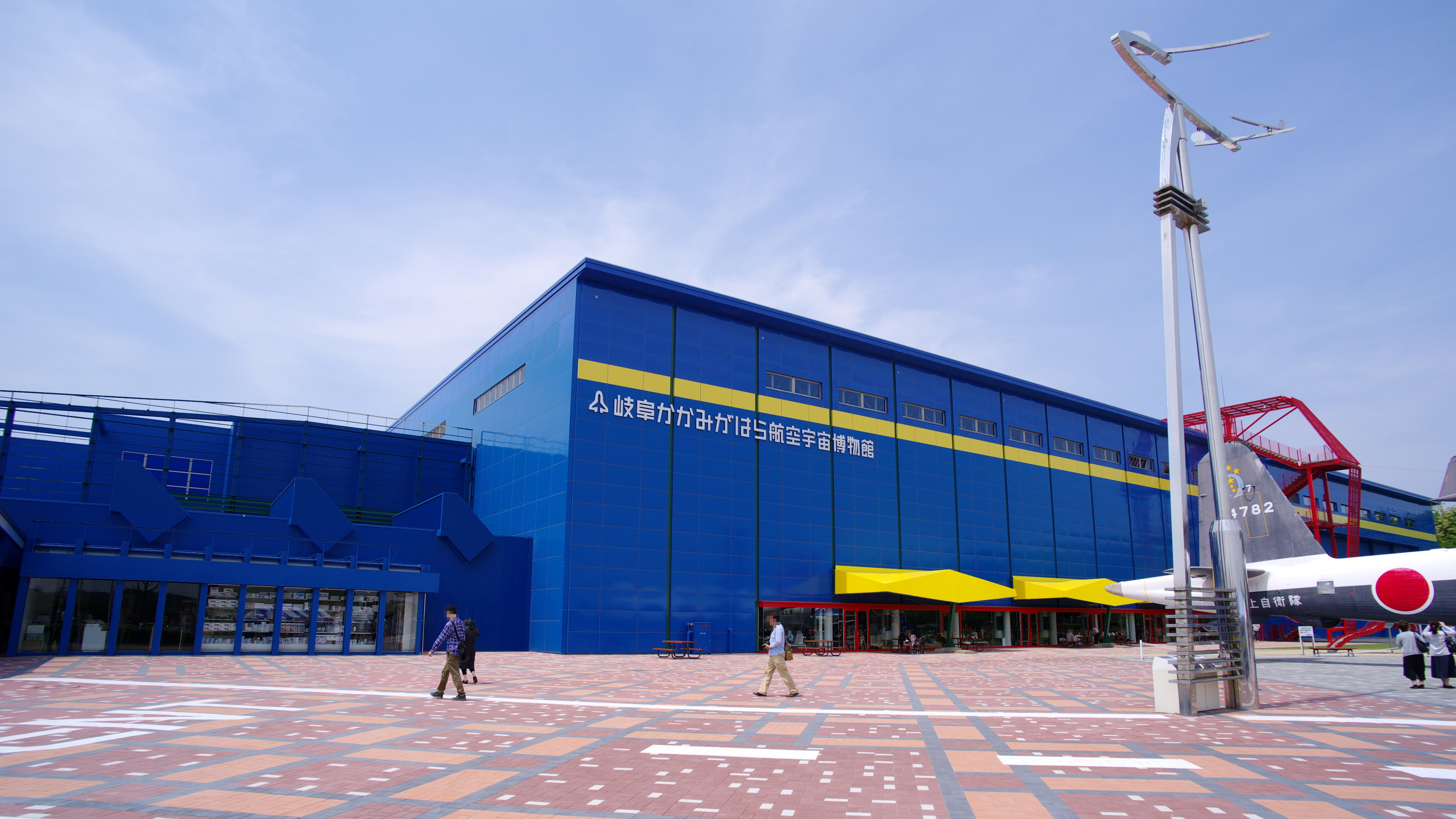
Kakamigahara Air and Space Museum

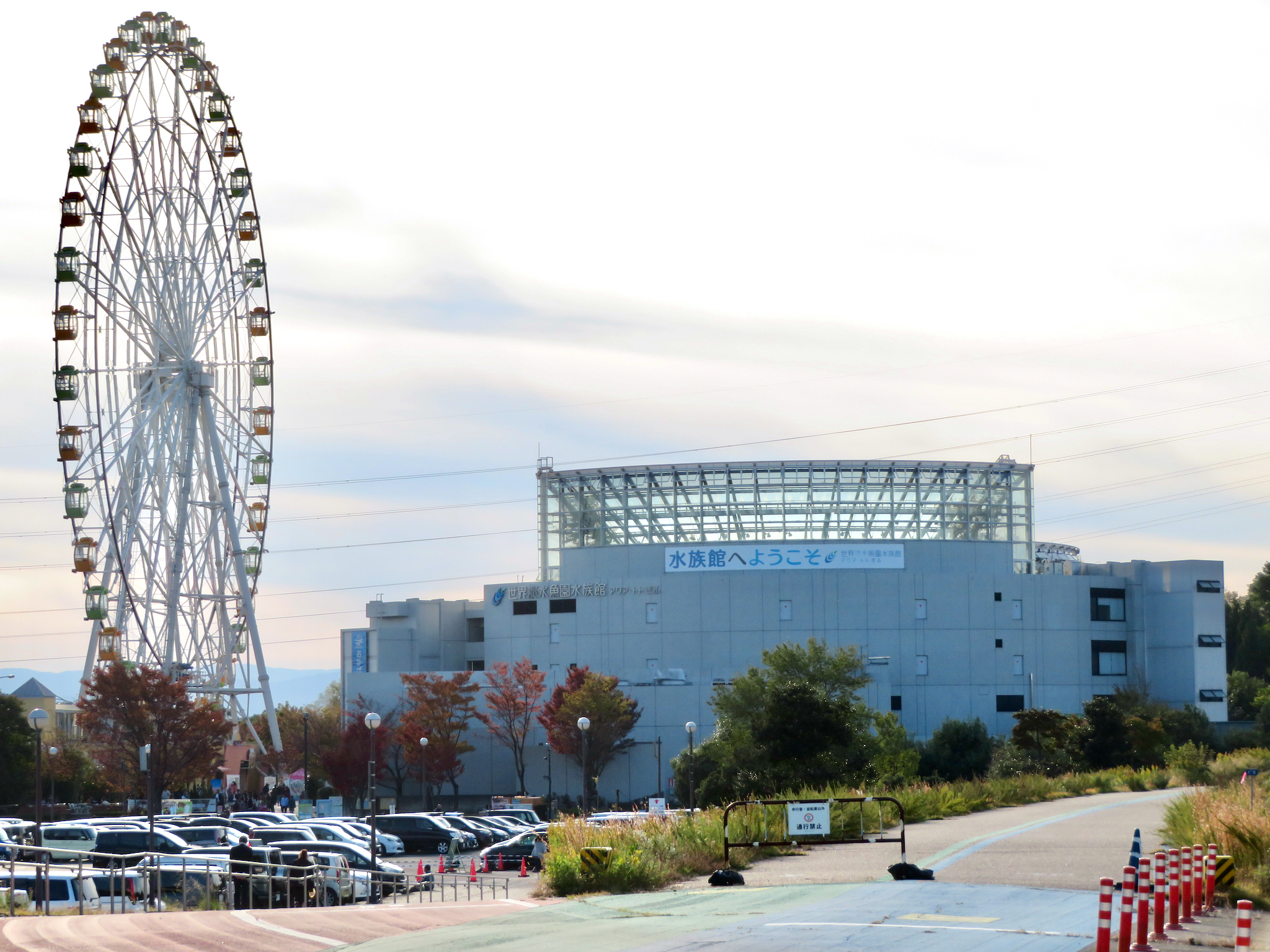
Gifu World Fresh Water Aquarium

- ÆON Kakamigahara Shopping Center opened in July 2007, ÆON, and houses 186 specialty shops and a JUSCO department store. The center includes a 10-screen multiplex cinema and a parking lot for about 4,000 cars.
- Gifu World Fresh Water Aquarium - Highway Oasis
- Kakamigahara Air and Space Museum - Kakamigahara Aerospace Science Museum features a number of indoor and outdoor exhibits, including aircraft and displays covering the history of aircraft development and Gifu prefecture's role in it.

== Sister cities ==
Kakamigahara is twinned with:

- Chuncheon, South Korea, since 2003

Friendly city

- Tsuruga, Japan, since 1989
