= Meitetsu Kakamigahara Line =

Railway line in Aichi Prefecture, Japan

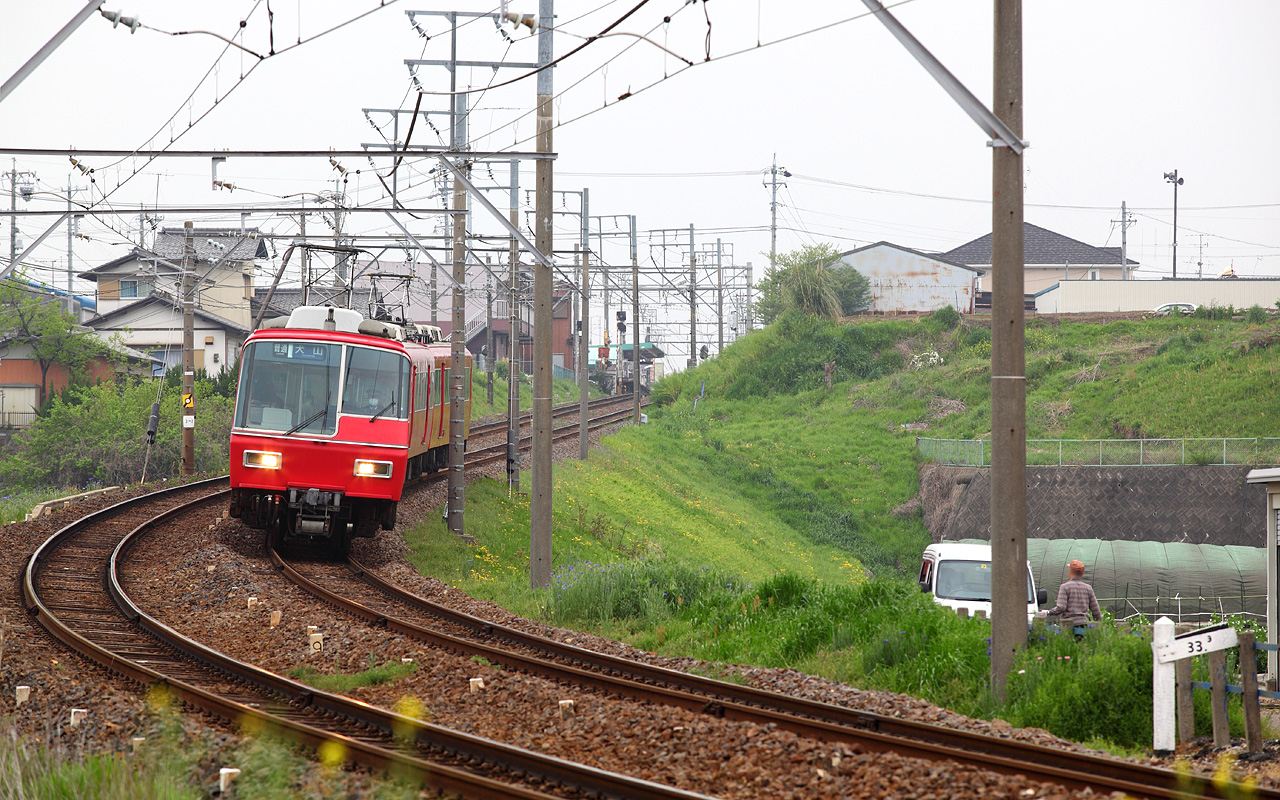
- A Kakamigahara Line train near Haba Station

Overview
- Native name: 名鉄各務原線
- Owner: Meitetsu
- Locale: Gifu Prefecture
- Termini: Meitetsu-Gifu; Shin-Unuma
- Stations: 18

Service
- Type: Commuter rail

History
- Opened: January 21, 1926; 100 years ago

Technical
- Line length: 17.6 km (10.94 mi)
- Track gauge: 1,067 mm (3 ft 6 in)
- Electrification: 1,500 V DC, overhead catenary
- Operating speed: 100 km/h (62 mph)

The Meitetsu Kakamigahara Line (名鉄各務原線, Meitetsu Kakamigahara-sen) is a 17.7 km (11.0 mi) railway line in Gifu Prefecture, Japan, operated by the private railway operator Meitetsu (Nagoya Railroad), connecting Meitetsu-Gifu station in the city of Gifu with Shin-Unuma station in Kakamigahara.

== Stations ==
● L: Local (普通, futsū)
● E: Express (急行, kyūkō)
● R: Rapid Express (快速急行, kaisoku kyūkō)
● MU: μSKY Limited Express (ミュースカイ, myū sukai)

No.	Name	Japanese	Distance (km)	L	E	R	MU	Transfers	Location	
NH60	Meitetsu Gifu	名鉄岐阜	0.0	●	●	●		■ Meitetsu Nagoya Line; Tōkaidō Main Line, Takayama Main Line (via Gifu)	Gifu	Gifu Prefecture
KG16	Tagami	田神	1.1	●	|	|			Gifu	Gifu Prefecture
KG15	Hosobata	細畑	2.9	●	|	|			Gifu	Gifu Prefecture
KG14	Kiridōshi	切通	3.9	●	●	●			Gifu	Gifu Prefecture
KG13	Tejikara	手力	4.8	●	|	|			Gifu	Gifu Prefecture
KG12	Takada-bashi	高田橋	5.4	●	|	|			Gifu	Gifu Prefecture
KG11	Shin Kanō	新加納	6.6	●	|	|			Kakamigahara	Gifu Prefecture
KG10	Shin Naka	新那加	7.5	●	●	●			Kakamigahara	Gifu Prefecture
KG09	Shiminkōen-mae	市民公園	8.1	●	|	|			Kakamigahara	Gifu Prefecture
KG08	Kakamigahara-shiyakusho-mae	各務原市役所前	8.7	●	●	●			Kakamigahara	Gifu Prefecture
KG07	Rokken	六軒	9.9	●	●	●			Kakamigahara	Gifu Prefecture
KG06	Mikakino	三柿野	11.2	●	●	●	●		Kakamigahara	Gifu Prefecture
KG05	Nijikken	二十軒	12.4	●	|	|	|		Kakamigahara	Gifu Prefecture
KG04	Meiden Kakamigahara	名電各務原	13.7	●	●	●	|	Takayama Main Line (via Kagamigahara)	Kakamigahara	Gifu Prefecture
KG03	Ogase	苧ヶ瀬	14.6	●	|	|	|		Kakamigahara	Gifu Prefecture
KG02	Haba	羽場	15.5	●	|	|	|		Kakamigahara	Gifu Prefecture
KG01	Unumajuku	鵜沼宿	16.5	●	|	|	|		Kakamigahara	Gifu Prefecture
IY17	Shin Unuma	新鵜沼	17.6	●	●	●	●	■ Meitetsu Inuyama Line; Takayama Main Line (via Unuma)	Kakamigahara	Gifu Prefecture

== History ==
The line was opened between 1926 and 1927 by the Mino Electric Railway, electrified at 600 V DC. The company merged with Meitetsu in 1935. The Gifu to Ogase section was double-tracked between 1938 and 1942, with the Ogase to Shin-Unuma section being double-tracked in 1964, the same year the voltage was increased to 1,500 V DC, enabling the maximum speed on the line to be raised from 65 km/h to 85 km/h.

=== Former connecting lines ===
A 1 km line branched off at Tagami Station, providing a connection to the Gifu Tram network (which was also 1,067 mm gauge) operated between 1970 and 2005 (when the tram system closed). It changed voltage (with a short dead section) to 600 V DC at the Keirinjo-mae end of the line.
