= Sohara Station (Gifu) =

Railway station in Kakamigahara, Gifu Prefecture, Japan

CG03 Sohara Station 蘇原駅
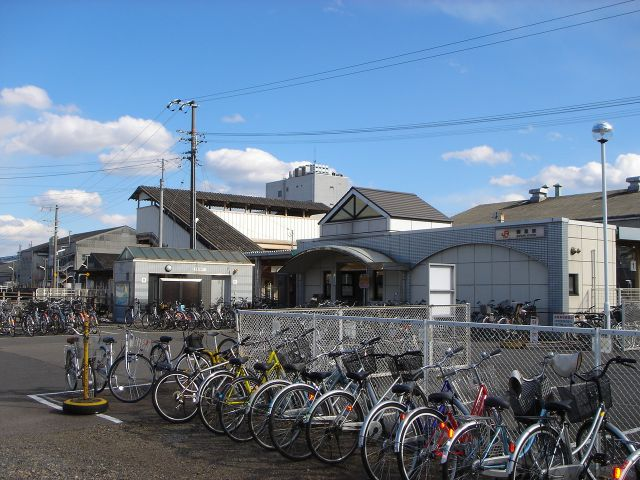
- Sohara Station in February 2005

General information
- Location: Sohara Zuiun-cho 1-chome, Kakamigahara-shi, Gifu-ken 504-0821; Japan
- Coordinates: 35.4034°N 136.8717°E
- Operator: JR Central
- Line: Takayama Main Line
- Distance: 10.4 km from Gifu
- Platforms: 1 side + 1 island platform
- Tracks: 3

Other information
- Status: Unstaffed
- Station code: CG03

History
- Opened: June 1, 1942; 84 years ago

Passengers
- FY2016: 1036
Location
- Location within Gifu Prefecture Location within Japan

Sohara Station (蘇原駅, Sohara-eki) is a railway station on the Takayama Main Line in the city of Kakamigahara, Gifu Prefecture, Japan, operated by Central Japan Railway Company (JR Central).

== Lines ==
Sohara Station is served by the JR Central Takayama Main Line, and is located 10.4 kilometers from the official starting point of the line at Gifu.

== Station layout ==
Sohara Station has one ground-level side platform and one ground-level island platform connected by a footbridge. The station is unattended.

=== Platforms ===
1	■ Takayama Main Line	for Mino-Ōta and Takayama
2, 3	■ Takayama Main Line	for Gifu and Nagoya

== Adjacent stations ==
«	Service	»
Takayama Main Line
Limited Express "Hida": Does not stop at this station
Naka	Local	Kagamigahara

== History ==
Sohara Station opened on June 1, 1942. The station was absorbed into the JR Central network upon the privatization of Japanese National Railways (JNR) on April 1, 1987.

== Surrounding area ==
- Kawasaki Aerospace Company Gifu Factory

== See also ==
- List of railway stations in Japan
