= Mikakino Station =

Railway station in Kakamigahara, Gifu Prefecture, Japan

Mikakino Station 三柿野駅

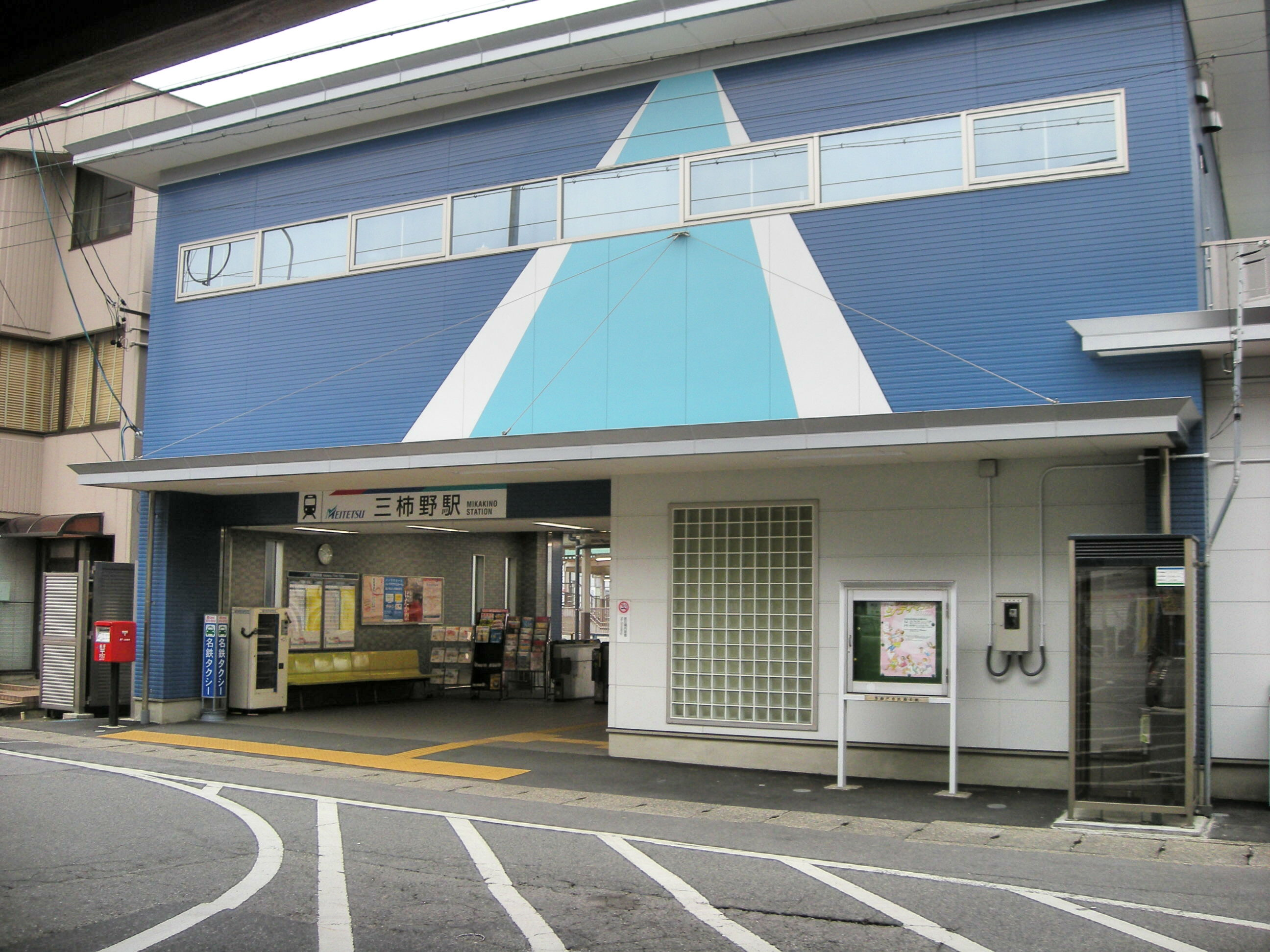
- Mikakino Station, February 2008

General information
- Location: 891-19 Sohara-Mikakinochō, Kakamigahara-shi, Gifu-ken 504-0904; Japan
- Coordinates: 35.3993°N 136.8752°E
- Operator: Meitetsu
- Line: ■Meitetsu Kakamigahara Line
- Distance: 11.2 km from Meitetsu-Gifu
- Platforms: 1 side + 1 island platforms

Other information
- Status: Staffed
- Station code: KG06
- Website: Official website (in Japanese)

History
- Opened: January 21, 1926

Passengers
- FY2015: 5063

Services
Preceding station	Meitetsu	Following station
Shin Unuma Terminus	Kakamigahara Line μSky	Terminus
Meiden Kakamigahara towards Shin Unuma	Kakamigahara Line Rapid Express Express	Rokken towards Meitetsu Gifu
Nijikken towards Shin Unuma	Kakamigahara Line Local	Rokken towards Meitetsu Gifu
Location
- Location within Gifu Prefecture Location within Japan

Mikakino Station (三柿野駅, Mikakino-eki) is a railway station located in the city of Kakamigahara, Gifu Prefecture, Japan, operated by the private railway operator Meitetsu.

== Lines ==
Mikakino Station is a station on the Kakamigahara Line, and is located 11.2 kilometers from the terminus of the line at Meitetsu Gifu.

== Station layout ==
Mikakino Station has one ground-level island platform and one ground-level side platforms connected by a level crossing. The station is staffed.

=== Platforms ===
1	■ Meitetsu Kakamigahara Line	For Shin-Unuma, and Inuyama
2	■ Meitetsu Kakamigahara Line	For Meitetsu Gifu and Meitetsu-Nagoya

== History ==
Mikakino Station opened on January 21, 1926, as Hokyūbu-mae Station (補給部前駅). It was renamed Kagami-Hokyubū-mae Station (各務補給部前駅) on June 27, 1931, but renamed again as Kōkushō-mae Station (航空廠前駅) on August 1, 1935. It was renamed to its present name on December 1, 1938.

== Surrounding area ==
- Sohara Station (JR Central)
- Gifu Air Field
- Kawasaki Aerospace Company
- National Route 21

== See also ==
- List of railway stations in Japan
