= Meitetsu Gifu Station =

Railway station in Gifu, Gifu Prefecture, Japan

Meitetsu Gifu Station 名鉄岐阜駅

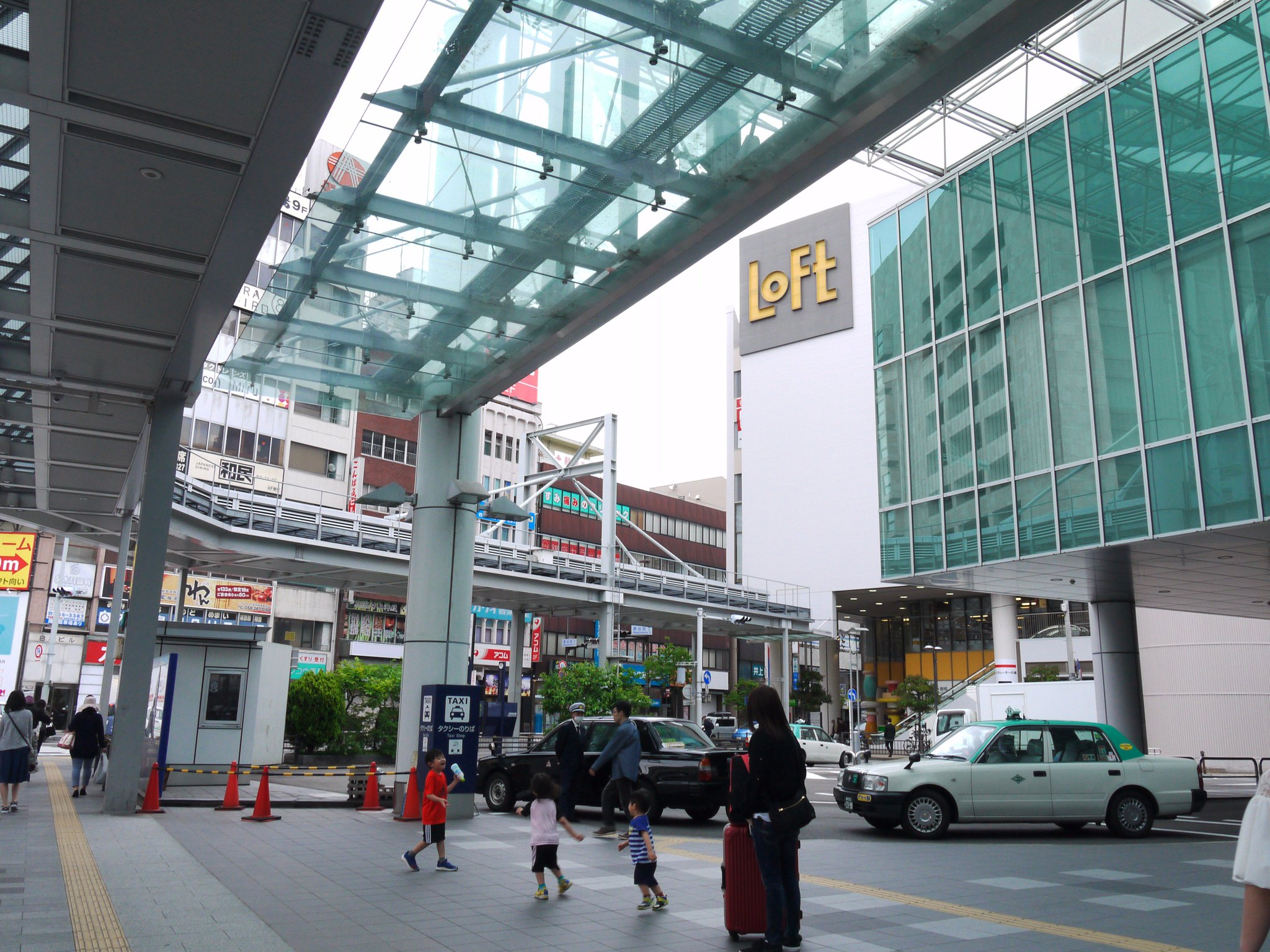
- Meitetsu Gifu Station, 2021

General information
- Location: 9-1 Kanda-cho, Gifu-shi, Gifu-ken 500-8833; Japan
- Coordinates: 35.411158°N 136.759918°E
- Operator: Meitetsu
- Lines: Nagoya Main Line; Kakamigahara Line
- Distance: 99.8 km from Toyohashi
- Platforms: 3 island platforms

Other information
- Status: Staffed
- Station code: NH60
- Website: Official website (in Japanese)

History
- Opened: February 11, 1911
- Former names: Shin-Gifu (until 2005)

Passengers
- 2015: 17,413 daily

Services
Preceding station	Meitetsu	Following station
Meitetsu Ichinomiya towards Central Japan International Airport	μSky	Terminus
Kasamatsu towards Toyohashi	Nagoya Main Line Rapid Limited Express Limited Express Express	Terminus
Kasamatsu towards Central Japan International Airport	Nagoya Main Line Rapid Express	Terminus
Kasamatsu towards Ina	Nagoya Main Line Semi-Express	Terminus
Kanō towards Ina	Nagoya Main Line Local	Terminus
Kiridōshi towards Shin Unuma	Kakamigahara Line Rapid Express Express	Terminus
Tagami towards Shin Unuma	Kakamigahara Line Local	Terminus
Location

Meitetsu Gifu Station (名鉄岐阜駅, Meitetsu Gifu-eki) is a railway station located in the city of Gifu, Gifu Prefecture, Japan, operated by the private railway operator Meitetsu. It is one of the two major railway stations of the city along with JR Gifu Station.

== Lines ==
Meitetsu Gifu Station is the terminal station for the Meitetsu Nagoya Main Line, and is 99.8 kilometers from the opposing terminus at Toyohashi. It is also a terminus for the 17.6 kilometer Meitetsu Kakamigahara Line.

== Station layout ==
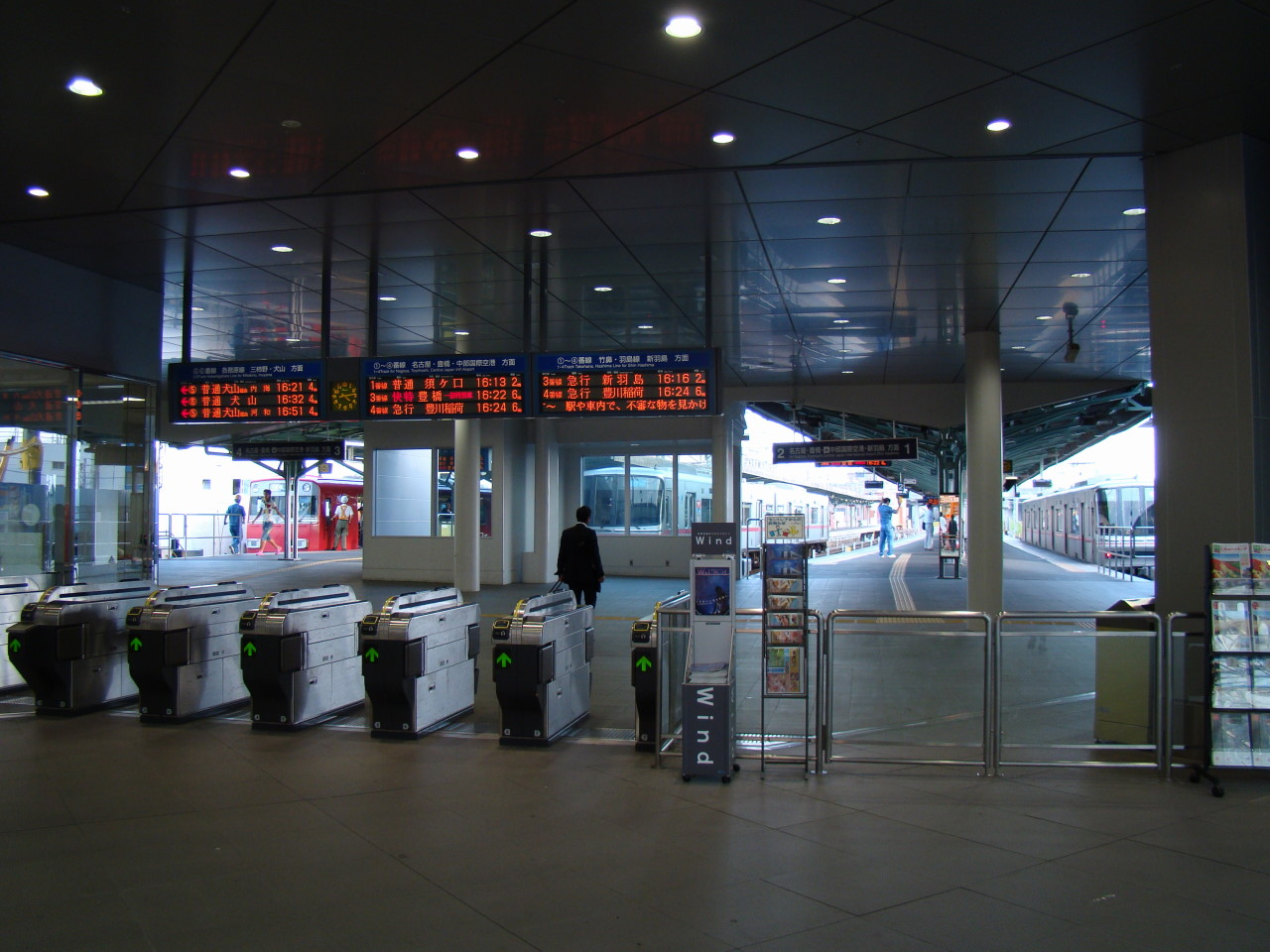
Entrance to the platforms

Meitetsu Gifu Station has three island platform arranged in a "V"-shape. Platforms 1-4 are elevated, and serve the Nagoya Main Line, and also onward service for trains of the Meitetsu Takehana Line and Meitetsu Hashima Line. Platforms 5-6 is on the ground-level, and serves the Kakamigahara Line and onward service for trains of the Meitetsu Inuyama Line.

1–4	■ Nagoya Main Line	For Meitetsu Nagoya, Toyohashi, and Central Japan International Airport
5/6	■ Kakamigahara Line	For Mikakino, Shin-Unuma, and Inuyama

== History ==
The rail line originally opened on February 11, 1911, as the Nagazumi-cho Station; at the time, it was operated by the Mino Electric Railroad, Co. On December 26, 1914, Shin-Gifu Station (the present-day station) on the Mino Electric Railroad's Kasamatsu Line (present day Nagoya Line) began operations. Service was again expanded on December 28, 1928, when the Kakamigahara Railroad (present day Kakamigahara Line) began operating from the Nagazumi-cho Station.

- April 18, 1948: Shin-Gifu Station of the Meigi Line (present day Nagoya Line) merged with Nagazumi-cho Station of the Kakamigahara Line. The Nagazumi-cho Station was renamed the Shin-Gifu Eki-mae Station as part of the Inner Gifu City Line.
- June 25, 1970: The Kanda Line opened, allowing trains from the Mino-machi Line to run on it.
- 1988: Platforms for Tracks 3 and 4 were extended, increasing their capacity from four to eight cars.
- January 1, 2005: The station was renamed Meitetsu Gifu Station.
- April 1, 2005: Track 7 and the Shin-Gifu Eki-mae Station were closed.
- January 29, 2005: The station was renamed from Shin-Gifu Station (新岐阜駅, Shin-Gifu-eki) when the new Rapid Limited Express service to Chūbu Centrair International Airport was introduced.
- July 14, 2007: The new entrance to the station was completed.
