= Shin Unuma Station =

Railway station in Kakamigahara, Gifu Prefecture, Japan

Shin Unuma Station 新鵜沼駅

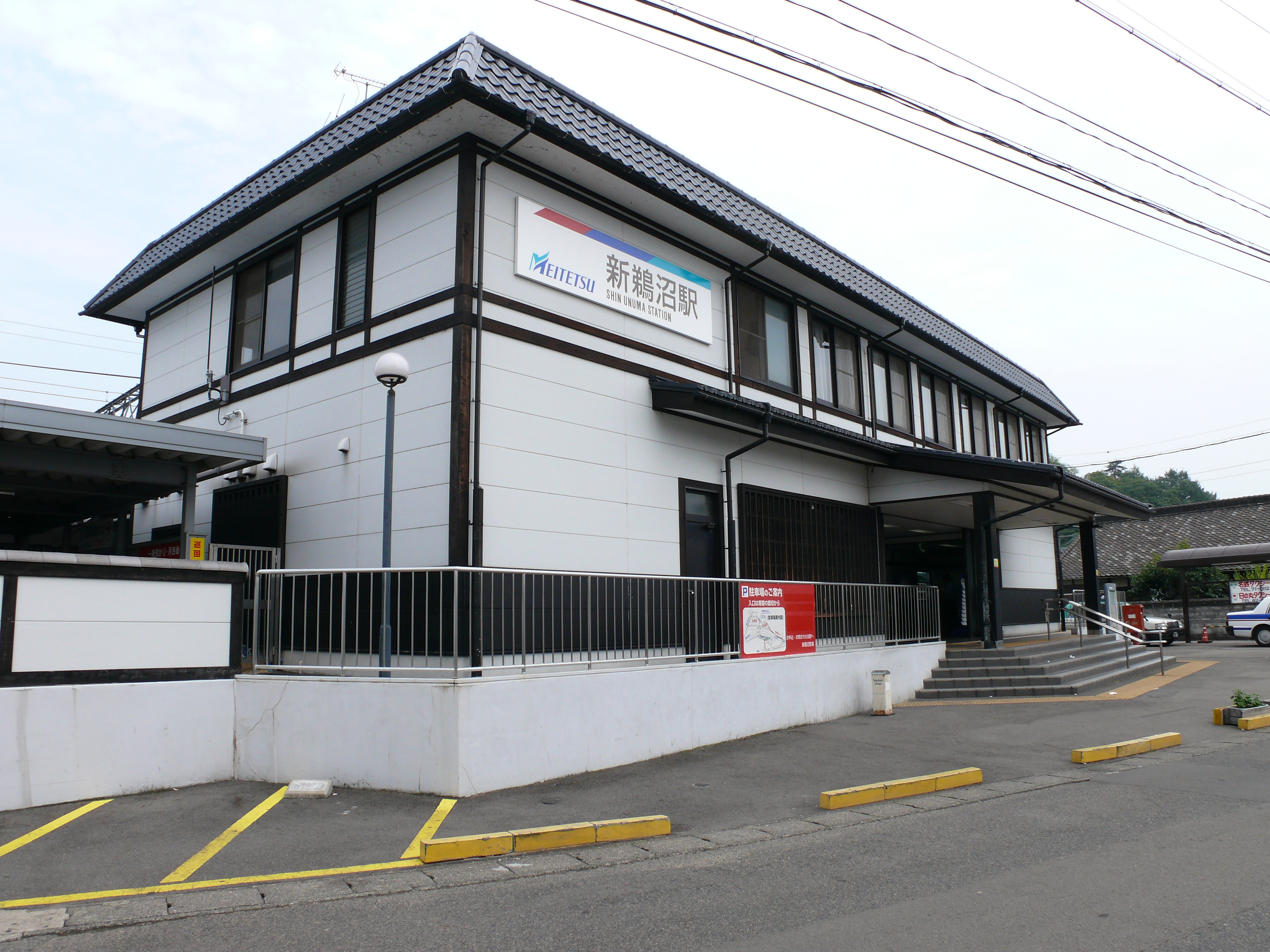
- Shin Unuma Station, June 2007

General information
- Location: 5 Chome Unuma Minamimachi, Kakamigahara-shi, Gifu-ken 509-0125; 17.6 km from Meitetsu-Gifu
- Coordinates: 35°23′48″N 136°56′40″E
- Operator: Meitetsu
- Lines: Inuyama Line; Kakamigahara Line
- Platforms: 2 island + 1 side platforms

Other information
- Status: Staffed
- Station code: IY17
- Website: Official website (in Japanese)

History
- Opened: 21 January 1926

Passengers
- FY2015: 11,024

Services
Preceding station	Meitetsu	Following station
Inuyama-Yūen towards Shimo Otai	Inuyama Line μSky (Inuyama-bound only)	through to Kakamigahara Line
Inuyama-Yūen towards Shimo Otai	Inuyama Line Rapid Limited Express Limited Express	Terminus
Inuyama-Yūen towards Shimo Otai	Inuyama Line Rapid Express Express	through to Kakamigahara Line
Inuyama-Yūen towards Shimo Otai	Inuyama Line Semi-Express	Terminus
Inuyama-Yūen towards Shimo Otai	Inuyama Line Local	through to Kakamigahara Line
through to Inuyama Line	Kakamigahara Line μSky (Inuyama-bound only)	Mikakino One-way operation
through to Inuyama Line	Kakamigahara Line Rapid Express Express	Meiden Kakamigahara towards Meitetsu Gifu
through to Inuyama Line	Kakamigahara Line Local	Unumajuku towards Meitetsu Gifu
Location
- Location within Japan

Shin Unuma Station (新鵜沼駅, Shin-Unuma-eki) is a railway station located in the city of Kakamigahara, Gifu Prefecture, Japan, operated by the private railway operator Meitetsu. This station and JR Central Unuma Station are connected with a passageway.

== Lines ==
Shin Unuma Station is a terminal station on the Kakamigahara Line, and is located 17.6 kilometers from the opposing terminus of the line at Meitetsu Gifu. It is also a station on the Inuyama Line, and is located 25.8 kilometers from the terminus of the line at Shimo-Otai. The station also offers express service to Chubu Centrair International Airport, using Meitetsu 2000 series trains on the Meitetsu μSky service.

== Station layout ==
Shin Unuma Station has two island platforms and one side platform connected by a footbridge. The station is staffed.

=== Platforms ===
1	■ Kakamigahara Line	for Gifu
2, 3, 4	■ Inuyama Line	for Inuyama and Nagoya
5	■ μSKY limited express trains	for Central Japan International Airport

== History ==
Shin Unuma Station opened on 1 October 1926.

== Surrounding area ==
- Kiso River
- Unuma Station

== See also ==
- List of railway stations in Japan
