= Rapid Train =

Type of train in Japan

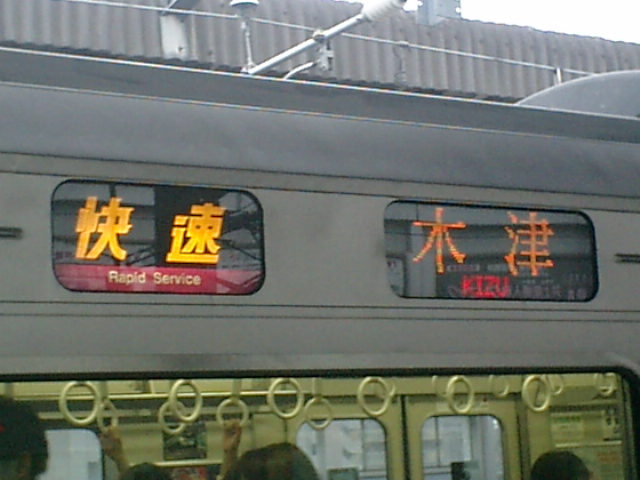
Example of 207 series Rapid Service display (JR Tōzai Line direct train)

In Japan, rapid trains (Japanese: 快速列車, Hepburn: Kaisoku Ressha) are passenger rail services that provide express services between their origin and destination, usually stopping only at major stations. They generally do not require surcharges. In the terminology used in the Passenger Operation Regulations of Japan National Railways (JNR) and JR Group, rapid trains are included in the broad sense of the term local trains (Japanese: 普通列車, Hepburn: Futsū Ressha).

Unless otherwise noted, this section focuses on rapid trains in Japan. Also, "Commuter Rapid" (通勤快速, Tsūkin Kaisoku) and other derivatives of "Rapid" (快速, Kaisoku) are also treated.

== JR Group ==
Under the JR Group's Passenger Operation Regulations, this is a type of local train that allows passengers to board without a surcharge, as opposed to an express train ("higher-category train" (優等列車, Yūtō ressha)).

Some rapid trains may be considered local trains in sections where they stop at all stations. For example, rapid trains on the Tōkaidō Main Line and San'yō Main Line (Biwako Line, JR Kyōto Line and JR Kōbe Line) in the Keihanshin area and local trains on the Joban Line operate as "Rapid" in the rapid operation section and "Local" in the section where the train stops at each station. These trains are not marked as "Rapid" in commercial timetables and are treated as local trains. As an unusual example, on the Shōnan–Shinjuku Line, trains on the Tōkaidō Line (-Takasaki Line) pass through Nishi-Ōi Station, Shin-Kawasaki Station, Hodogaya Station, and Higashi Totsuka Station where trains on the Yokosuka Line (-Utsunomiya Line) stop, so the latter are operated as "Rapid" trains even though they stop at the same stations as Trains stopping at every stations on the Tōkaidō Main Line.

Although many of these trains operate over relatively long distances, they often stop at all stations in the terminal section.

However, there are cases where the existence of a direct or express train itself is useful. For example, Aioi City and Ako City in Hyogo Prefecture have been promoting the fact that they can reach Keihanshin by "one Shin-Kaisoku" train to promote tourism and settlement activities, but the March 26, 2016 timetable revision eliminated daytime Shin-Kaisoku service, replacing it with local trains. Although the new rapid trains are not reduced in service since they stop at each station along these lines, the situation has become a cause for concern from the municipalities along the lines. Even if the rapid trains operate only during the daytime, their presence has the advantage that the travel time can be posted on real estate advertisements (if the travel time during commuting hours increases or if the rapid trains do not operate, it is necessary to add a note to that effect, but that note is small).

=== Rolling stock ===
Unlike Limited Express trains and Express trains, the type of rolling stock used is not basically defined, but usually a regular train car (general, suburban, or commuter type) is used. From July 1992 to March 2016, some of JR Hokkaido's Airport trains were Limited Express trains (781 series, 785 series, and 789-1000 series) between Sapporo and Asahikawa Stations. JR East used Limited Express trains (185 series, E257 series, etc.) for some of the temporary rapid trains in the Tokyo metropolitan area, such as the Holiday Rapid (most of these trains are now upgraded to Limited Express).

Some trains were downgraded and used limited express cars as they are. For example, JR East used 485 series sets for rapid trains between Niigata Station and Itoigawa Station, which were newly established after the abolition of the Hokuetsu limited express and operated until the March 4, 2017 timetable revision. However, the use of 485 series trains was terminated due to the discontinuation of these trains and their upgrading to Limited Express trains by replacing them with new train types. In the past, some trains used Express type cars, and as a form of downgrading, 153 series were used on the "Shin-Kaisoku" in the Keihanshin area and the Rapid in the Chukyo area, KiHa 58 and KiHa 65 series trains were used on the Rapid Mie, and 165 series trains were used on the "Moonlight Echigo".

On some intercity routes and sightseeing routes, some or all cars are reserved-seat cars, requiring a reserved-seat ticket in addition to the train ticket, and some trains are coupled with green cars.

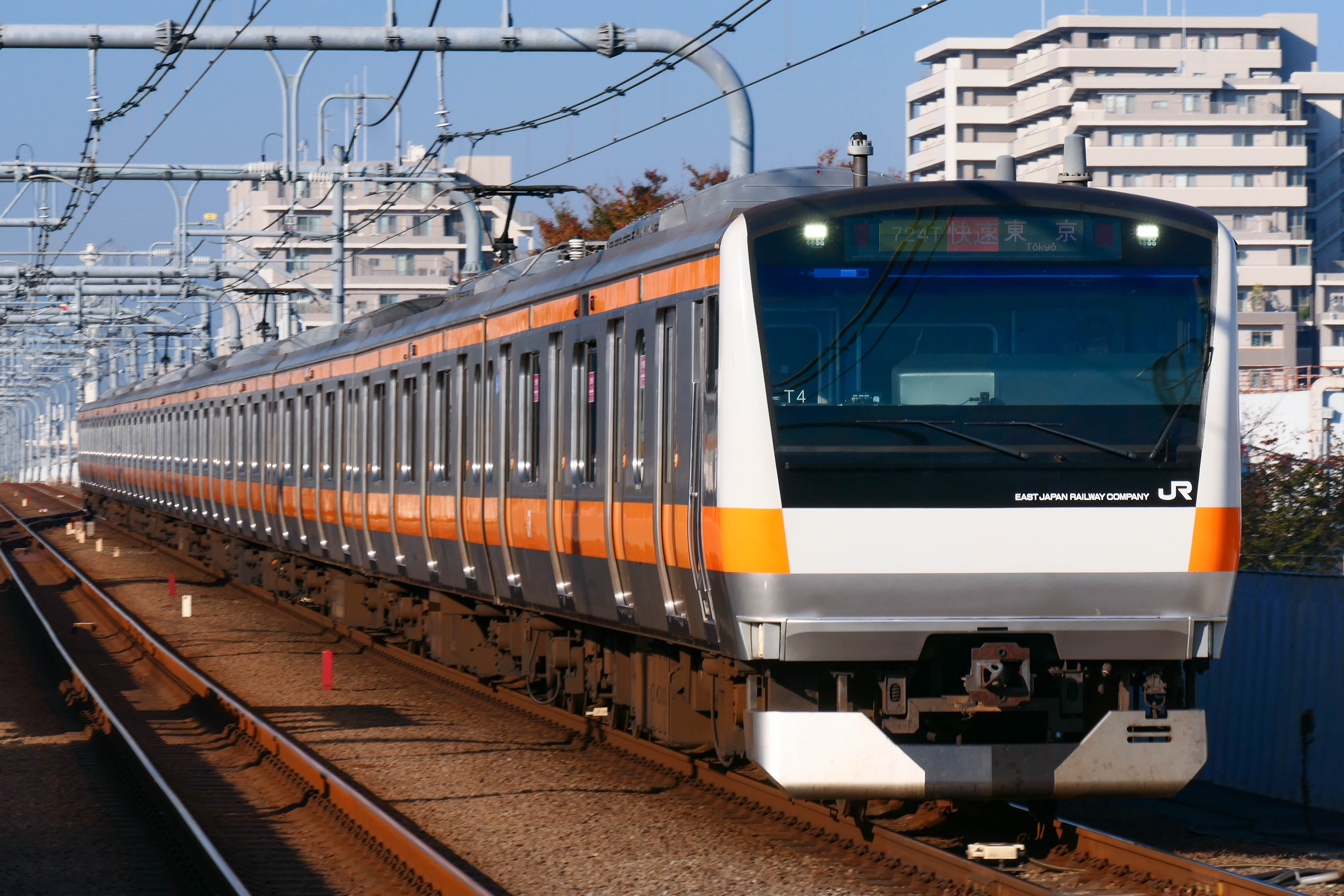
Rapid trains on the Chūō Main Line using the general commuter type (E233 series)

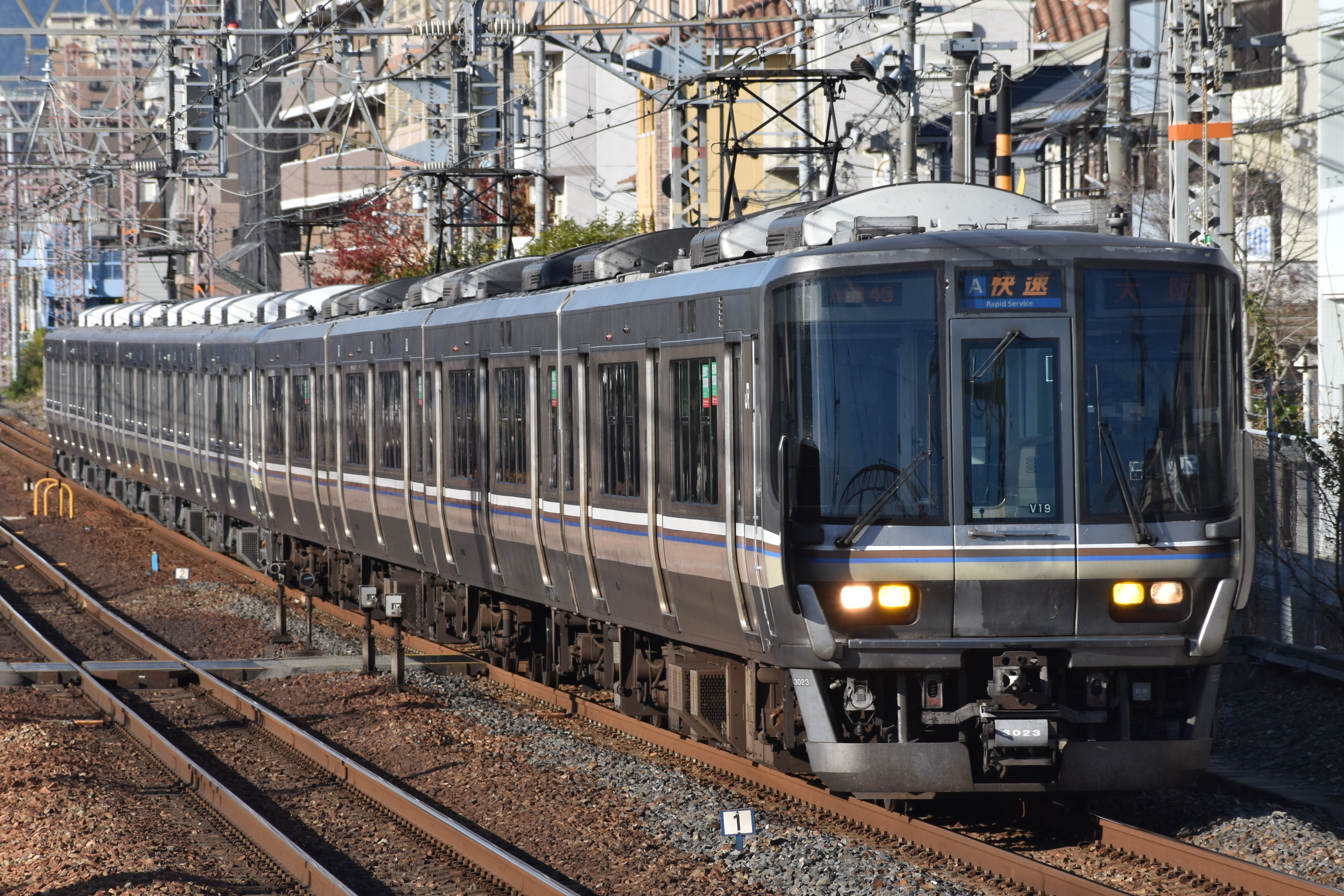
Rapid Trains of JR Kobe Line using suburban type (223 series)

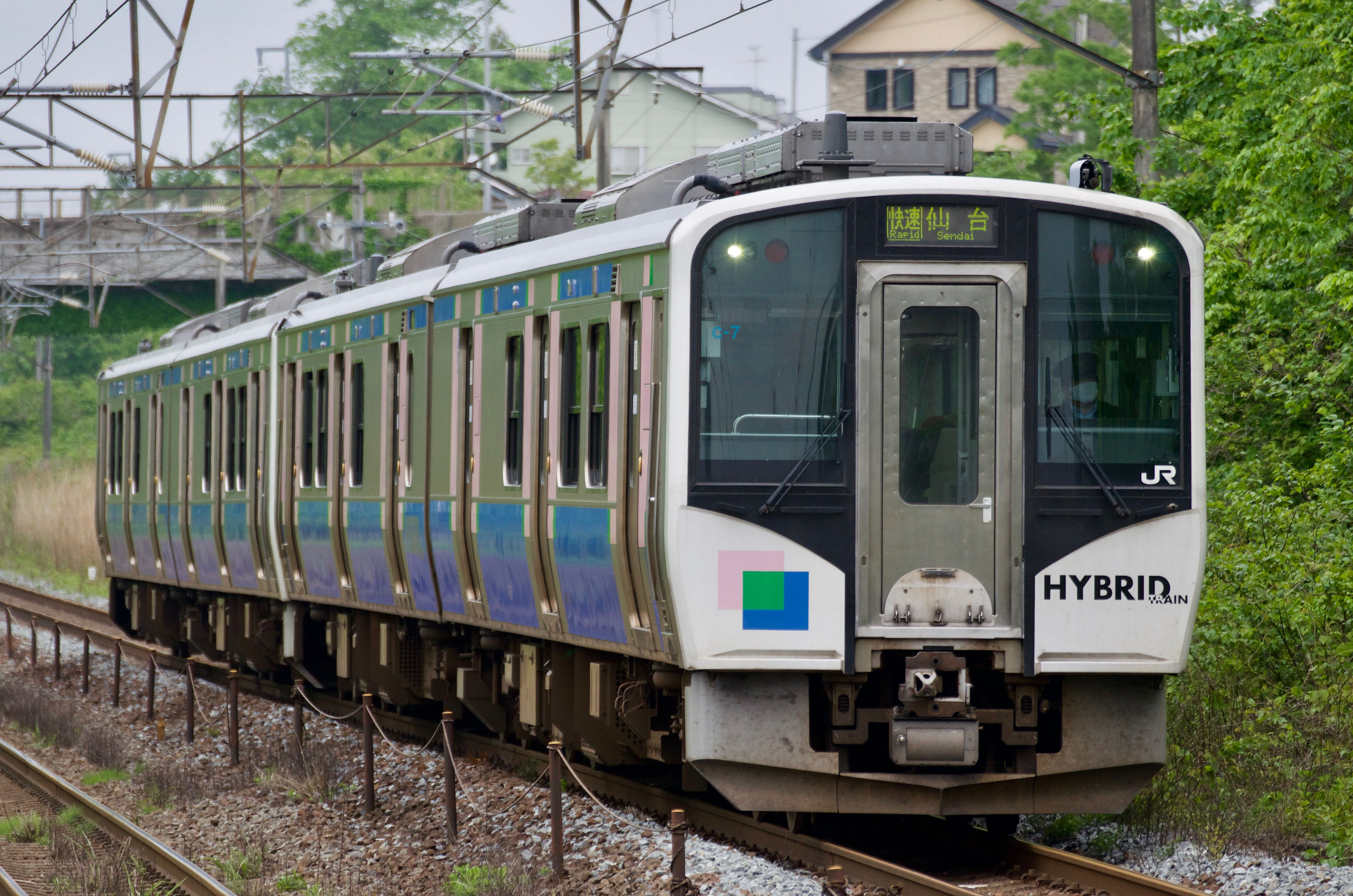
Rapid Trains on the Senseki-Tōhoku Line using the general type (HB-E210 series)
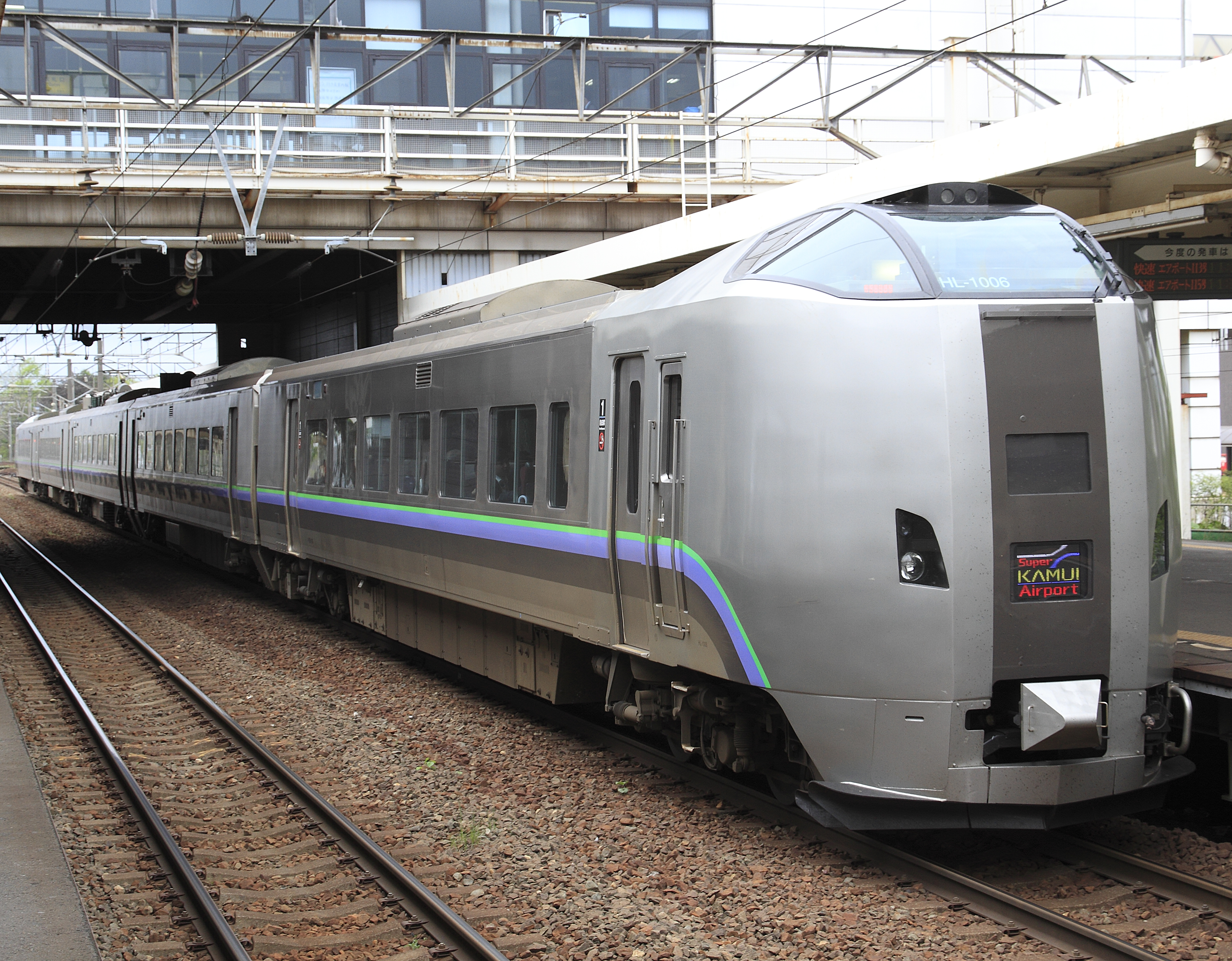
Rapid "Airport" at that time using Limited Express type (789-1000 series)

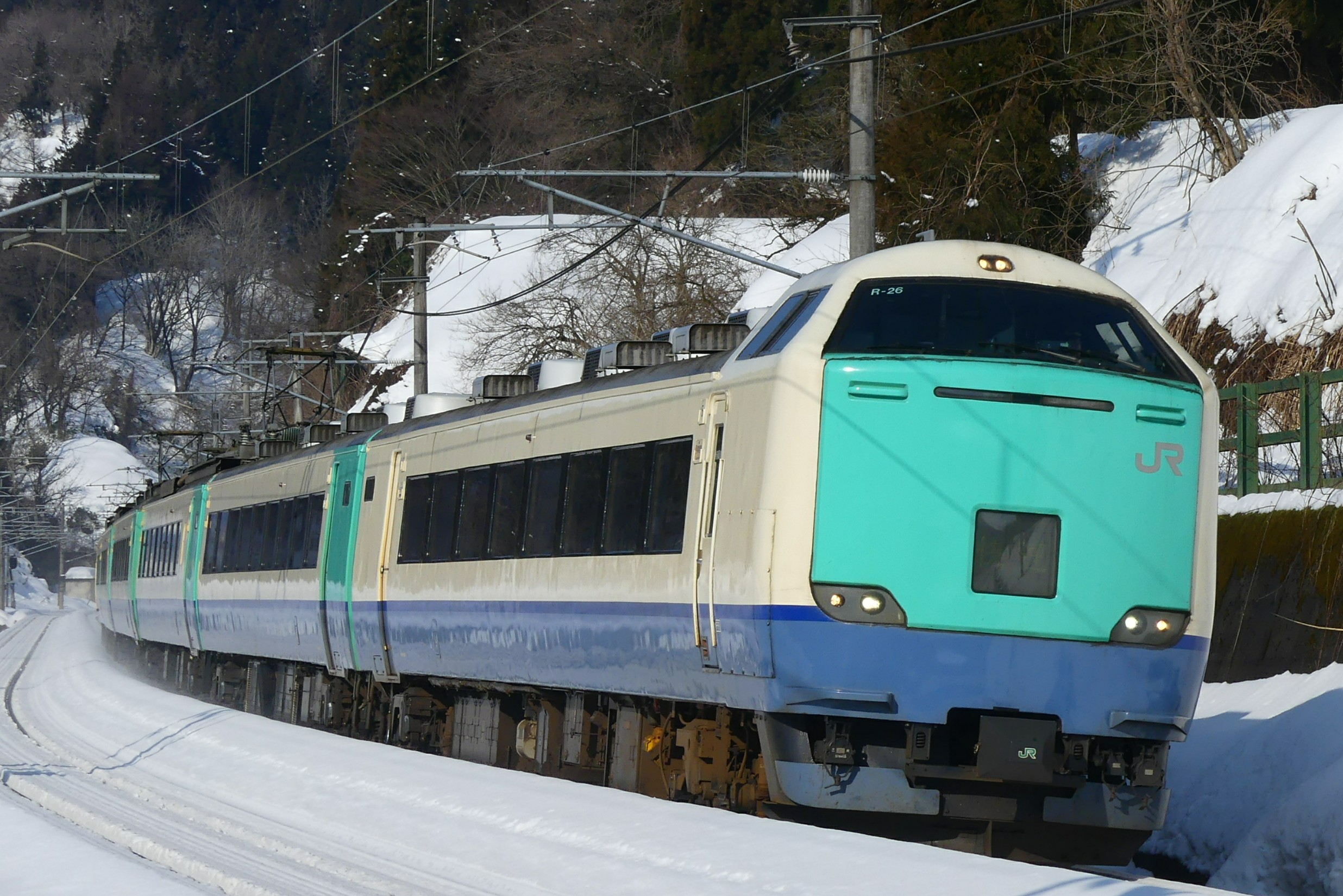
Rapid Train operated by 485 series between Niigata Station and Itoigawa Station.

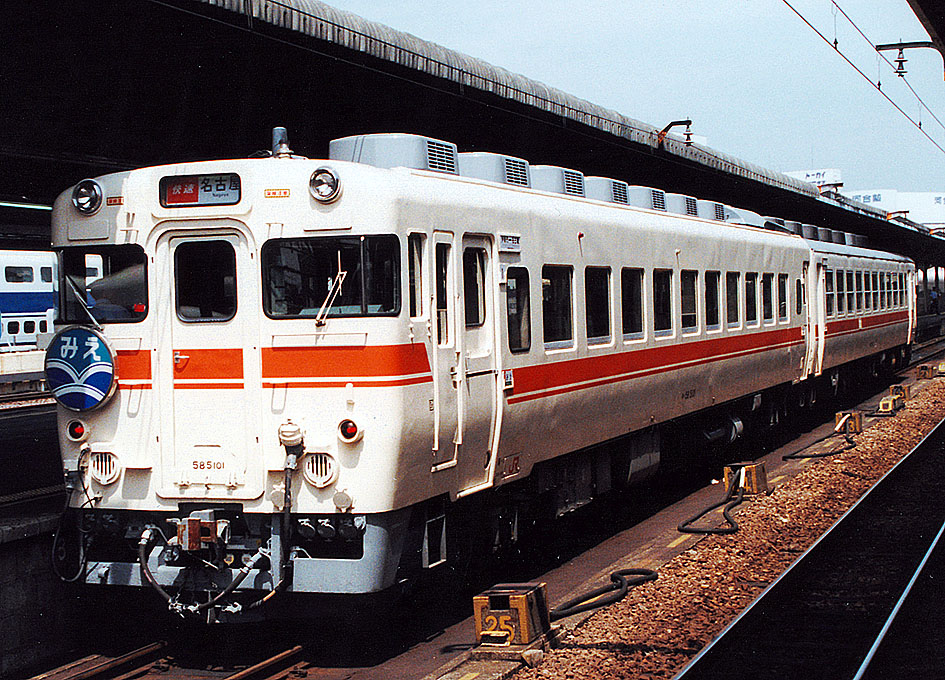
Rapid "Mie" that used an Express Train type.

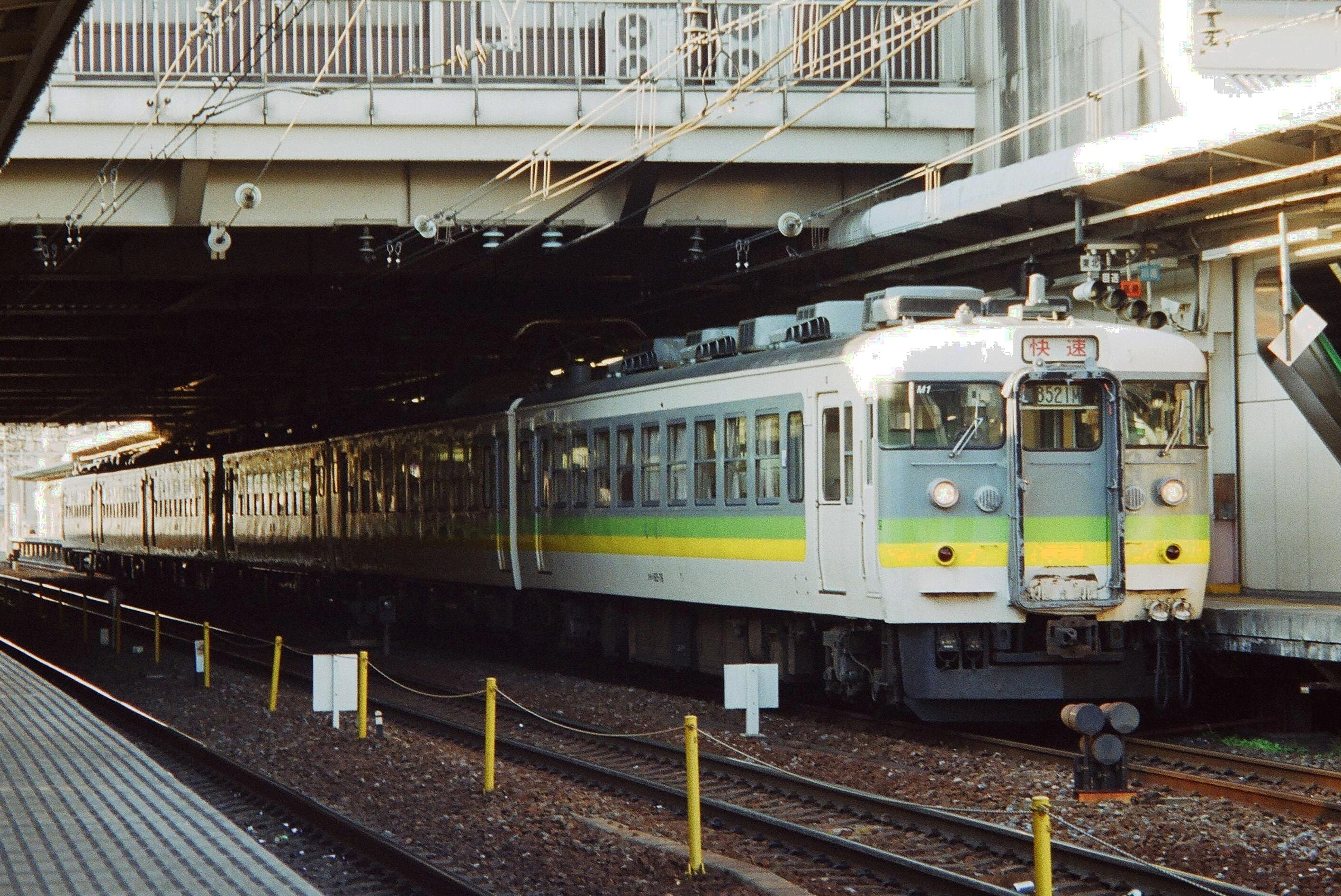
165 series used for "Moonlight Echigo"

=== Nickname ===
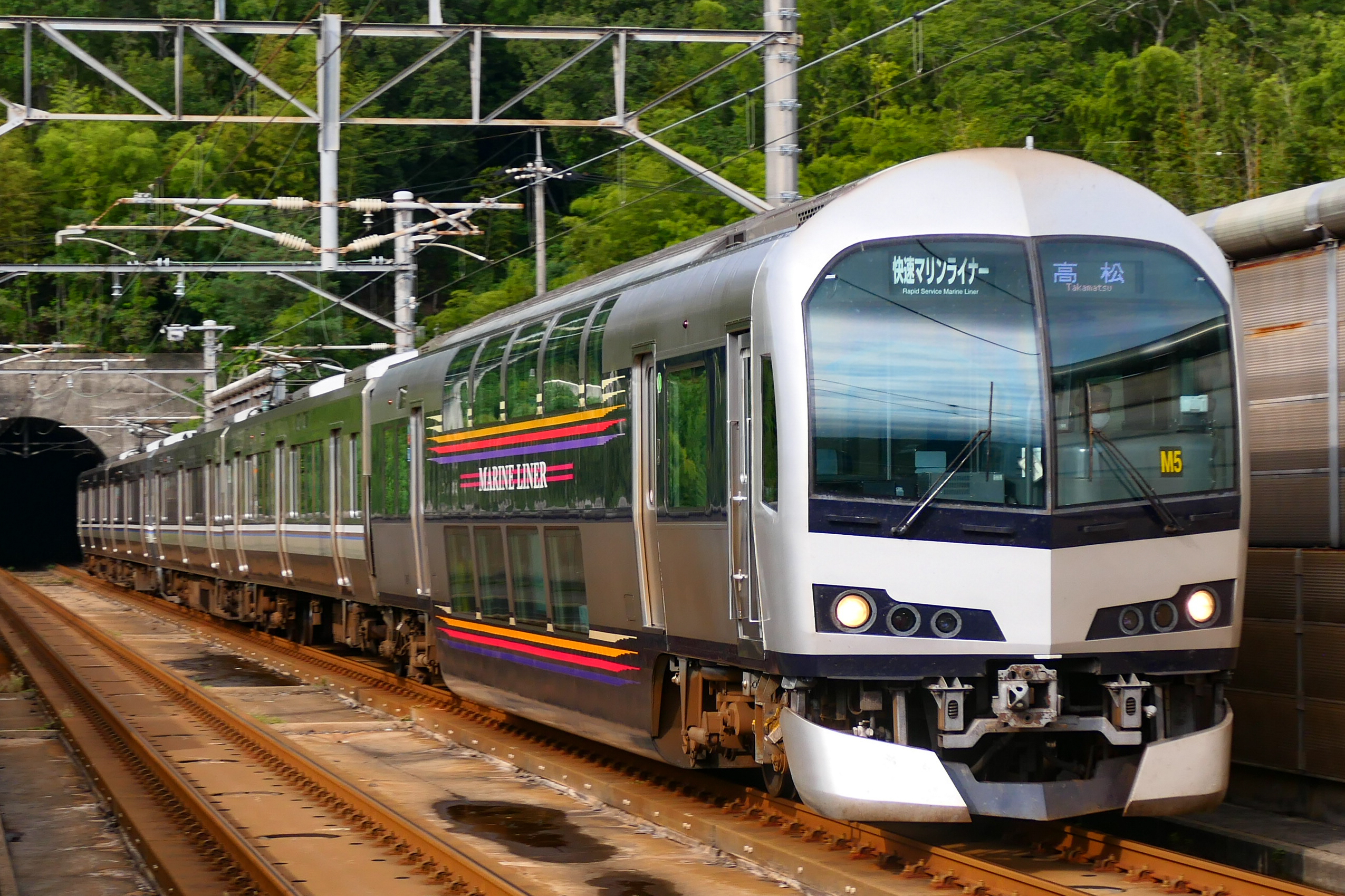
Example of a Rapid Train with a train nickname:"Marine Liner"

Most of JR Hokkaido's rapid trains are given train nicknames, but most of the other regions do not have train nicknames. However, there are (or were) some cases where rapid trains with nicknames were operated, such as "Tottori Liner" (San'in Main Line), "Acty" (Tōkaidō Line), "Seaside Liner" (Ōmura Line), and "Moonlight XX" Night Trains.

For trains that have reserved seats, such as Airport, Marine Liner, Hamayuri, Mie, and Home Liner, the train is identified by its nickname, not by its train number, when managing the reserved seat ticketing system. For this reason, when two or more trains with the same name are operated, the train number (e.g., "Marine Liner No. XX") is assigned.

A train that operates as an electric multiple unit (電車, Densha) around a specified sections of trains with passing stations is called a "rapid electric multiple unit"(快速電車, Kaisoku Densha). Although this is mainly meant as an express train for local trains, it may cause discrepancies when running parallel to a medium-distance train (Local Train).

The reason why ordinary trains on the Joban Line, JR Kyoto Line, and JR Kobe Line are referred to as "rapid" in specified sections of trains, as mentioned above, is to distinguish them from the local trains that run separately, and to unify their stops with those of ordinary trains (by train), which are medium-distance trains connecting areas that are not already served by Local Trains.

In the Joban Line, although rapid trains used to stop at Mikawashima and Minami-Senju stations, which were out of the double-double track plan due to the five-way commuter plan, and at Tennodai station, which was greatly delayed, ordinary trains used to pass through (in the past, there were other stations that ordinary trains passed through). The information was unified to "Rapid" in the revision of March 13, 2004 and October 16, 2004, respectively.

Originally, "Express Trains" started to be operated on the Chūō Main Line as an express service, but when Express Trains started to be operated for a fee, the name was changed to "rapid trains" due to confusion. Even on the Chūō Main Line, ordinary trains used to stop at fewer stations than rapid trains (although some rapid trains, such as View Yamanashi, follow the "ordinary" stopping system on the Chūō Rapid Line).

=== Other ===
Some trains are labeled as "Local" while still having a passing station or in the form of a special passing train. In the days of the former JNR, there were trains that passed through stations with few passengers or short platforms in the morning and evening hours on regional lines, but they were treated simply as local trains, not as "rapid" trains. On the Takayama Line, as of 2017, the first and last trains operating between Takayama Station and Gifu Station are still "Local," but they stop at every station between Gero Station and Gifu Station, and only at Kuguno Station, Hida-Hagiwara Station, and Hida-Osaka Station between Takayama Station and Gero Station.

Conversely, there are cases where a train calls itself a "rapid" train even though it only passes through one station in its entire route. For example, as of the March 16, 2013 revision, this is the case for some rapid trains operating in the Kita-Kinki region, such as San'in Line, Maizuru Line, and Bantan Line. Also, the Chuo Line rapid trains that operate only between Musashi-Koganei Station, Tachikawa Station, between Toyoda Station and Takao Station, and Otsuki Station do not pass through any station (although the train is a local train).

Similarly, the "Shin-Kaisoku" trains bound for Banshu-Ako stop at every station on the Ako Line, but the type curtain remains "Shin-Kaisoku".

== Private and third-sector railways ==
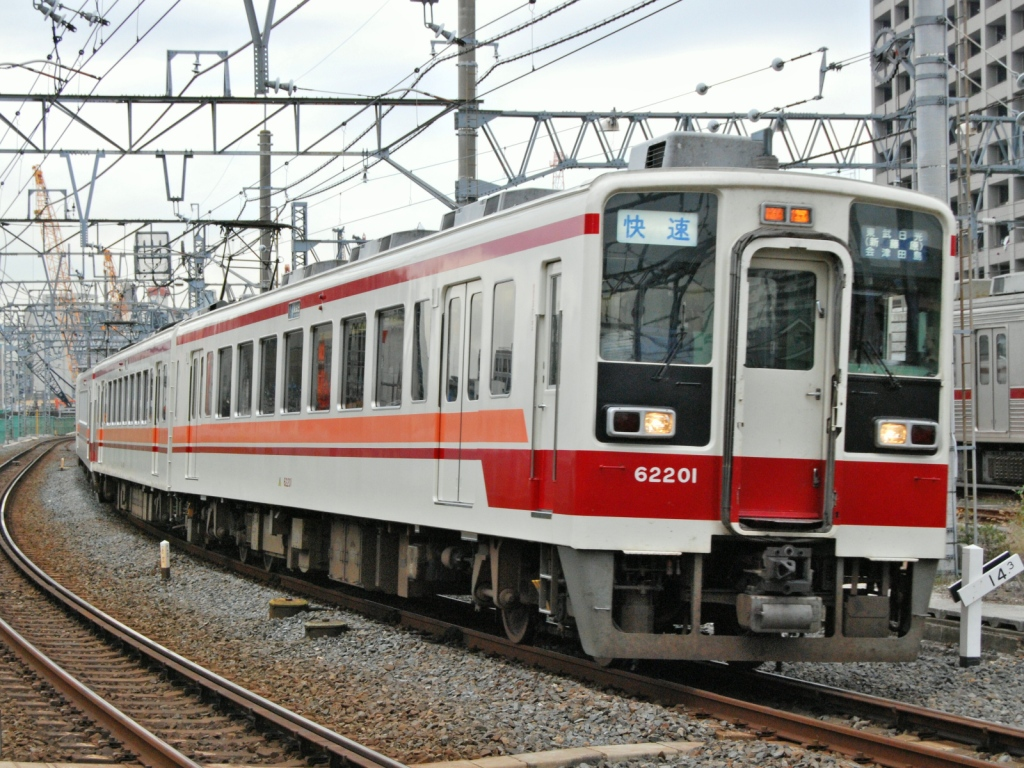
Rapid Train on the Tobu Isesaki Line operated with special cars.

Some private and third-sector railways also offer rapid train services, which, unlike JR Group trains, are sometimes treated as "higher-category trains" alongside other services such as Limited Express, Express, and Semi-Express. However, whether or not fare-free trains are also included in the category of "higher-category trains" differs among railroad companies, and some companies do not treat them as "Higher-category trains" in the same way as the JNR and JR Group. For example, the Rapid Trains and sectional rapid trains that operated on Tobu Isesaki Line and Nikkō Line until April 2017 were operated by the 6050 series, semi-cross-seat cars designed to be used on such trains, but the company does not use the term "Higher-category trains" to describe fare-free trains, even if they are classified as express trains. Keio Electric Railway also operates trains using the 6050 series semicross-seat cars. Keio Electric Railway also refers to trains that do not stop at every station as "Express Series Trains"(急行系列列車, Kyūkō Kēretsu ressha) rather than "Higher-category trains". They are also sometimes operated on subway lines such as the Yokohama Municipal Subway Blue Line, the Tokyo Metro Tōzai Line, and the Toei Asakusa and Shinjuku lines.

The hierarchical relationship with semi-express, express, and other train types differs depending on the railroad company.

Some lines, such as the Tsukuba Express of the Metropolitan Intercity Railway and the Tozai Line of the Tokyo Metro, offer only "rapid" and "commuter rapid" trains, which are derivatives of "rapid" trains.

Most of the private railway companies in eastern Japan offer "Rapid" type trains, and some of the major private railway companies in the Kanto region, other than Odakyu Electric Railway, have offered this type of train. On the other hand, few operators in western Japan offer such services, and among major private railway companies, Hankyu Corporation (Kyoto Main Line) ceased its service after the December 17, 2022, timetable revision. It is also sometimes referred to as "Kaisoku" among residents along private railway lines in the Kansai region as an abbreviation for rapid express train.

Unlike limited express trains and some express trains, the type of car used is not exclusively specified in most cases, and basically ordinary cars (commuter-type cars in major private railways) are used. As an exceptional case of using an exclusive train, Tobu Railway uses 6050 series on its Isesaki and Nikko lines, as mentioned above. In the past, 6000 series, its predecessor, and 5700 series, downgraded from limited express, were used. The "Marine Liner Hamanasu" operated by the Kashima Waterfront Railway used Series 7000 as its exclusive train. In addition, until March 17, 2007, the Miyazu Line of the Kita-Kinki Tango Railway had a "rapid train with stops at every station" between Miyazu Station and Nishi-Maizuru Station at 10:00 p.m., with no passing stations, for the reason that the trains were used for Limited Expresses car.

As of 2021, some rapid trains operated by some private railways charge a fee in addition to the fare, including "Shinano Sunrise-go and Shinano Sunset-go" operated by Shinano Railway (from March 2015 to July 2020, all seats are changed to non-reserved seats), "Ainokaze Toyama Railway and IR Ishikawa Railway's The "Aino Kaze Liner" operated by Aino Kaze Toyama Railway and IR Ishikawa Railway requires a reserved seat ticket (liner ticket) in addition to the fare. In the past, the "Marine Liner Hamanasu" operated by Kashima Rinkai Railway required a ticket of 200 yen in addition to the fare. In addition, Tobu Railway and Izu Hakone Railway operated rapid trains with some seats reserved (see also Home Liner).

== English translation ==
In most cases, "Rapid (Service)" is used for the English translation of "快速" (Kaisoku), and JR East uses the term "Rapid Service train".

For the derivatives of rapid trains, it is common to translate "区間快速" (Kukan-Kaisoku) into English as "Section Rapid," "通勤快速" (Tsūkin-Kaisoku) as "Commuter Rapid," and "特別快速" (Tokubetsu-Kaisoku) as "Special Rapid," respectively.

However, the English transliteration differs depending on the operator, with JR Central's Tōkaidō Main Line and Metropolitan New Transit Railway's Tsukuba Express using "Semi Rapid" for "区間快速" (Kukan-Kaisoku). JR West translates "新快速" (Shin-Kaisoku) as "Special Rapid Service" and "区間快速" (Kukan-Kaisoku) as "Regional Rapid Service", while JR Central translates "新快速" (Shin-Kaisoku) into English as "New Rapid Train". This is because JR Central has "特別快速" (Tokubetsu-Kaisoku, English translation:"Special Rapid Train"). However, the literal translation of "新快速" (Shin-Kaisoku) is "New Rapid", and the literal translation of "特別快速" (Tokubetsu-Kaisoku) is "Special Rapid".

JR West's "直通快速" (Chokutsū-Kaisoku) is translated into English as "Direct Rapid Service".

Tokyo Monorail's "空港快速" (Kūkō-Kaisoku) is translated into English as "HANEDA EXPRESS" and "区間快速" (Kukan-Kaisoku) as "RAPID", respectively.

Hokuetsu Kyuko's "超快速" (Chō-Kaisoku) is translated into English as "Chō-Rapid", and Kobe Electric Railway's "特快速" (Toku-Kaisoku) is translated into English as "Special Rapid Express".
