= Jōro Station =

Railway station in Gero, Gifu Prefecture, Japan

Jōro Station 上呂駅
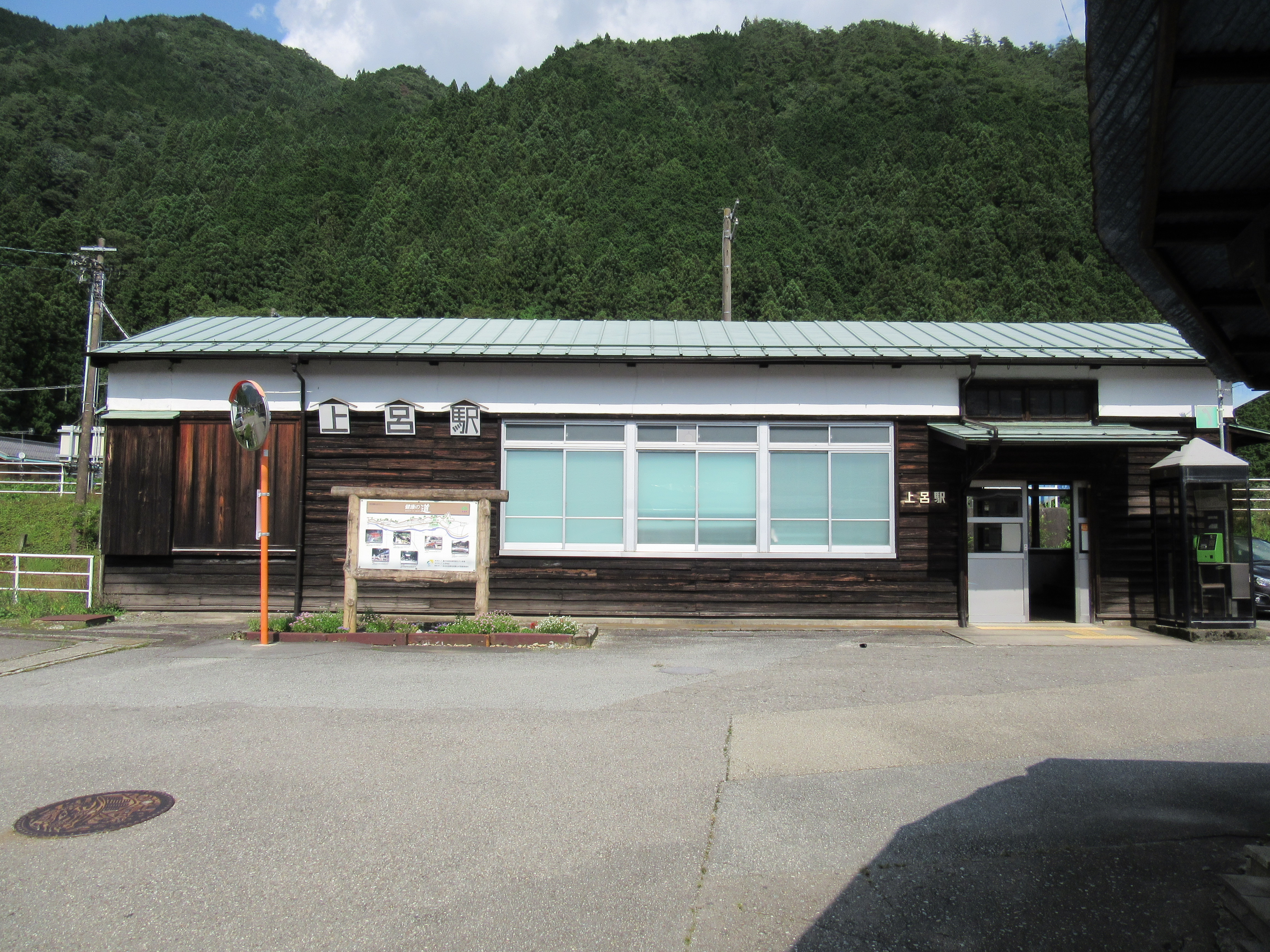
- Jōro Station in July 2019

General information
- Location: 1610 Hagiwara Jōro, Gero-shi, Gifu-ken 509-2518; Japan
- Coordinates: 35.9112°N 137.2044°E
- Operator: JR Central
- Line: Takayama Main Line
- Distance: 100.8 km from Gifu
- Platforms: 2 side platforms
- Tracks: 2

Other information
- Status: Unstaffed

History
- Opened: August 25, 1933; 93 years ago
Location
- Location within Gifu Prefecture Location within Japan

Jōro Station (上呂駅, Jōro-eki) is a railway station on the Takayama Main Line in the city of Gero, Gifu Prefecture, Japan, operated by Central Japan Railway Company (JR Central).

== Lines ==
Jōro Station is served by the JR Central Takayama Main Line, and is located 100.8 kilometers from the official starting point of the line at Gifu.

== Station layout ==
Jōro Station has two ground-level side platforms connected by a level crossing. The station is unattended.

=== Platforms ===
1	■ Takayama Main Line	for Takayama and Toyama
2	■ Takayama Main Line	for Gero and Gifu

== Adjacent stations ==
«	Service	»
Takayama Main Line
Limited Express "Hida": Does not stop at this station
Hida-Hagiwara	Local	Hida-Miyada

== History ==
Jōro Station opened on August 25, 1933. The station was absorbed into the JR Central network upon the privatization of Japanese National Railways (JNR) on April 1, 1987.

== Surrounding area ==
- National Route 41
- Hida River

== See also ==
- List of railway stations in Japan
