= Osaka, Gifu =

Dissolved municipality in Gifu prefecture, Japan

Map of Osaka, Gifu

Osaka (小坂町, Osaka-chō) was a town located in Mashita District, Gifu Prefecture, Japan. It had an area of 247.50 km².

On March 1, 2004, the former town of Gero absorbed the towns of Hagiwara, Kanayama and Osaka, and the village of Maze (all from Mashita District) to create the city of Gero. Following this merger, Osaka became a district within the city of Gero.

== Geography ==
Osaka located in the south-eastern region of Hida Province in a mountainous area at the base of Mount Ontake. Due to the steep slopes of Mount Ontake, the town resides at the bottom of a ravine formed by Hida River, Osaka River and their tributaries.

97% of the land is made up of forests, which contains a number of Tenpō-growth, such as the Hinoki cypress. More than 60% of these are nationally protected.

There are also many waterfalls, including Neo Waterfall. The town established a waterfall survey committee and, as a result of their investigation, it was determined that there were more than two hundred waterfalls with a height of more than 5 m (16 ft). As a result, Osaka became known as the town with the most waterfalls within Japan.

The vicinity around Mount Ontake is designated as Mount Ontake Prefectural Nature Park.

- Mountains: Mount Ontake
- Rivers: Hida River, Osaka River

== Former neighboring municipalities ==
- Mashita District: Hagiwara, Gero
- Ōno District: Kuguno, Asahi
- Kiso District, Nagano Prefecture: Kaida, Mitake, Ōtaki

== History ==
- March 7, 1875: Eleven villages merged becoming the village of Osaka, Chikuma Prefecture
- August 21, 1876: With the ablation of Chikuma prefecture, the three districts (Ōno, Yoshiki, and Mashita) became part of Gifu Prefecture
- July 1, 1889: Creation of the village of Osaka within Mashita District
- March 2, 1898: Becomes the town of Osaka
- March 1, 2004: The former town of Gero absorbed the towns of Hagiwara, Kanayama and Osaka, and the village of Maze (all from Mashita District) to create the city of Gero.

== Sister cities ==
=== Domestic ===
- Hōdatsushimizu, Ishikawa Prefecture

=== International ===
- Salesópolis (Brazil)

== Sightseeing ==
=== Tourist spots ===
- Mount Ontake
- Neo Waterfall
- Galaxy Spa Ski Resort
- Hida Osaka cycling road
- Dandate Ravine
- Osaka Museum

=== Onsen ===
- Nigorigo Onsen
- Yuya Onsen
- Shitajima Onsen

== Transportation ==
=== Train lines ===
- JR Central
  - Takayama Main Line: Hida-Osaka Station
