= Nagisa Station =

Nagisa Station is the name of two train stations in Japan:

- Nagisa Station (Nagano)
- Nagisa Station (Gifu)
