= Seishun 18 Ticket =

Japanese ticket

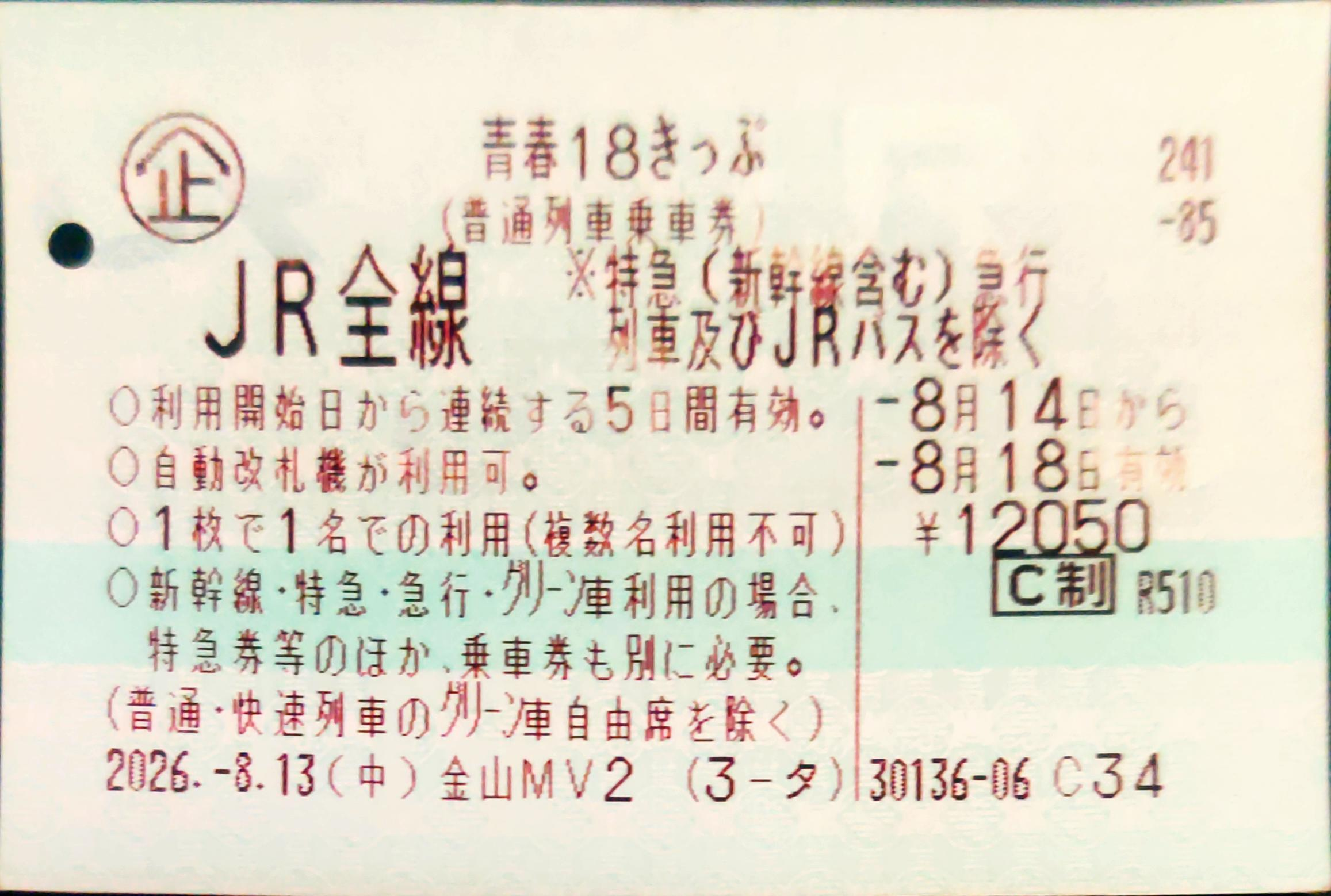
A Seishun 18 ticket issued in 2026 (for 5 days)

The Seishun 18 Ticket (青春18きっぷ, Seishun Jūhachi Kippu) is a special discount ticket issued in Japan that allows holders one-day unlimited rides on the local trains of Japan Railways Group (JR) during limited periods of the year.

== Overview ==
From the ticket's introduction in the 1980s to 2024, one ticket was valid for five non-consecutive days (midnight to midnight) within a designated seasonal period. The ticket was able to be used by multiple passengers; for example, five passengers could use one entire ticket sheet for unlimited trips in one day, or one person could use it for travel across five days. The ticket cost 12,050 yen and was ideal for long-distance travellers. The ticket could not be used in automatic ticket machines, and railway staff stamped the ticket at the beginning of each day of use.

On October 24, 2024, the ticket's conditions of use were changed. The new tickets are only valid for five consecutive days, cannot be shared between multiple people, and can now be used to pass through automatic ticket gates. The five-day ticket's price remained the same as before, and a new three-day variant was also made available for 10,000 yen.

The Seishun 18 ticket covers travel on all local trains, which includes all passenger trains except for the Shinkansen, limited express, and express services, which require express surcharges. However, for Japan Railways Group, "local trains" (普通列車, futsū ressha) include not only "local" (普通, futsū; also called 各停 kakutei, lit. "every stop") trains that stop at all stations, but also "rapid" (快速, kaisoku) train services. Rapid trains provide express service to destinations by passing intermediate stations, but do not require the surcharges of "express" trains.

There is no age limit to buy the ticket despite the name "Seishun 18" (literally "Youth 18"). The ticket is not available at standard ticket vending machines, but it can be purchased from higher-end machines that sell Shinkansen tickets during the sale period under the heading "Discount Tickets" (お得なきっぷ, otoku na kippu), over the counter at JR railway stations, or from a travel agency during the sale period.

== Ticket sale and usage ==
The ticket is available for purchase during three different periods of the year. Although JR authorities state that these dates are subject to change, the dates of availability have remained unchanged since the ticket was first released in 1982 and can be considered standard data. When a ticket is purchased, it can be used only for that particular season. JR is able to issue full refunds for tickets that remain unused before the end of the "Tickets on sale" period.

Period	Validity	Tickets on sale
Spring	March 1 to April 10	February 20 to March 31
Summer	July 20 to September 10	July 1 to August 31
Winter	December 10 to January 10	December 1 to December 31

=== Scope of use ===
- Unlimited rides in non-reserved seats in standard cars on "local trains" (普通列車, Futsū ressha) across all JR lines.
- "local trains" (普通列車, futsū ressha) includes trains such as Rapid Trains (快速列車, Kaisoku ressha) that do not require an additional fare.
- Can use reserved seats in standard cars and non-reserved seats in green cars by purchasing the necessary additional tickets for each.
- Can use JR Miyajima Ferry, Hitahiko Line BRT, Kesennuma Line BRT and Ōfunato Line BRT.

== Ticket benefits ==
=== Hisatsu Orange Railway ===
On the Hisatsu Orange Railway, the Orange 18 Free Ticket (おれんじ18フリーきっぷ, Orenji Jūhachi Kippu) is sold for 2,100 yen to passengers who have valid a Seishun 18 Ticket during its period of validity (a same-day seal is placed on the ticket).

=== Echigo Tokimeki Railway ===
On the Echigo Tokimeki Railway, the Tokitetsu 18 Ticket (トキ鉄18きっぷ, Tokitetsu Jūhachi Kippu) is sold for 1,000 yen to passengers who have valid Seishun 18 Tickets in a valid period of time (a same-day seal is placed on ticket).

== History ==
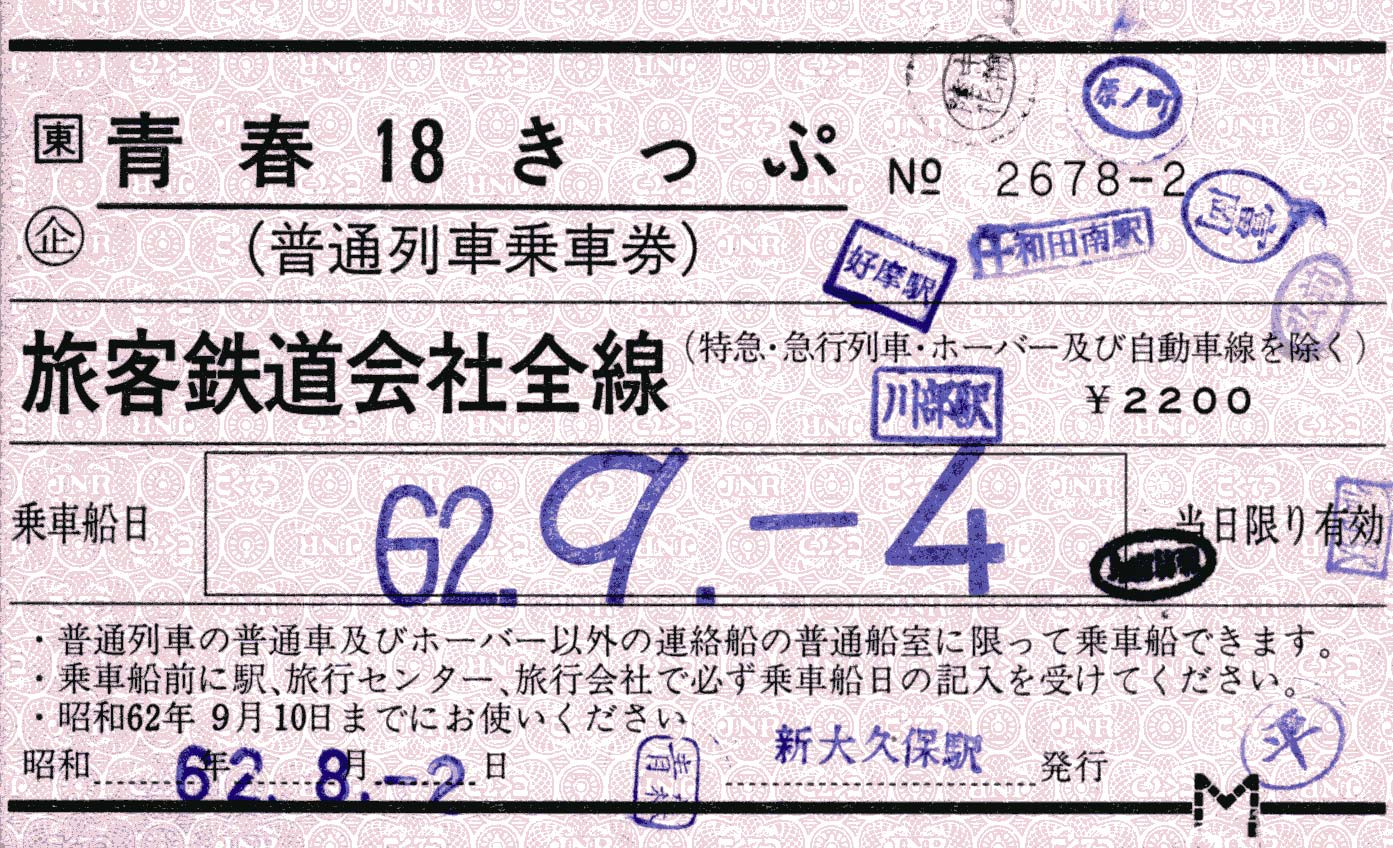
A used Seishun 18 ticket issued in 1987

The ticket first went on sale from March 1, 1982, as the Seishun 18 Nobinobi Kippu (青春18のびのびきっぷ). It cost 8,000 yen and consisted of three 1-day tickets and one 2-day ticket. It also included a "Seishun 18" sticker for passengers to stick on their bags when travelling.

In 1983, the name was changed to Seishun 18 Kippu (青春18きっぷ). The price was raised to 10,000 yen for a booklet of four 1-day tickets and one 2-day ticket (equivalent to 1,666 yen per day, compared with 1,600 yen per day for the original ticket).

In summer 1984, the format was changed to a booklet of five 1-day tickets, with the price remaining at 10,000 yen, equivalent to 2,000 yen per day.

The price was raised to 11,000 yen in the winter of 1986 following the nationwide fare increase in July of that year.

With the introduction of the consumption tax in 1989, the price was raised to 11,300 yen for the summer ticket, and this was further increased to 11,500 yen in summer 1997 after the consumption tax increased from 3% to 5%. In 2014, the consumption tax was raised to 8%, leading to a price of 11,850 yen. In 2019, the consumption tax was raised to 10%, which raised the ticket's price to 12,050 yen.

The format of the ticket changed from the booklet to single ticket sheets in spring 1996 as a measure to prevent users from re-selling unused portions to ticket resellers.

In October 2024, the ticket's validity was changed to be five consecutive days and single-person use. Like the Japan Rail Pass for foreign tourists, the ticket can now be used in automatic ticket gates.

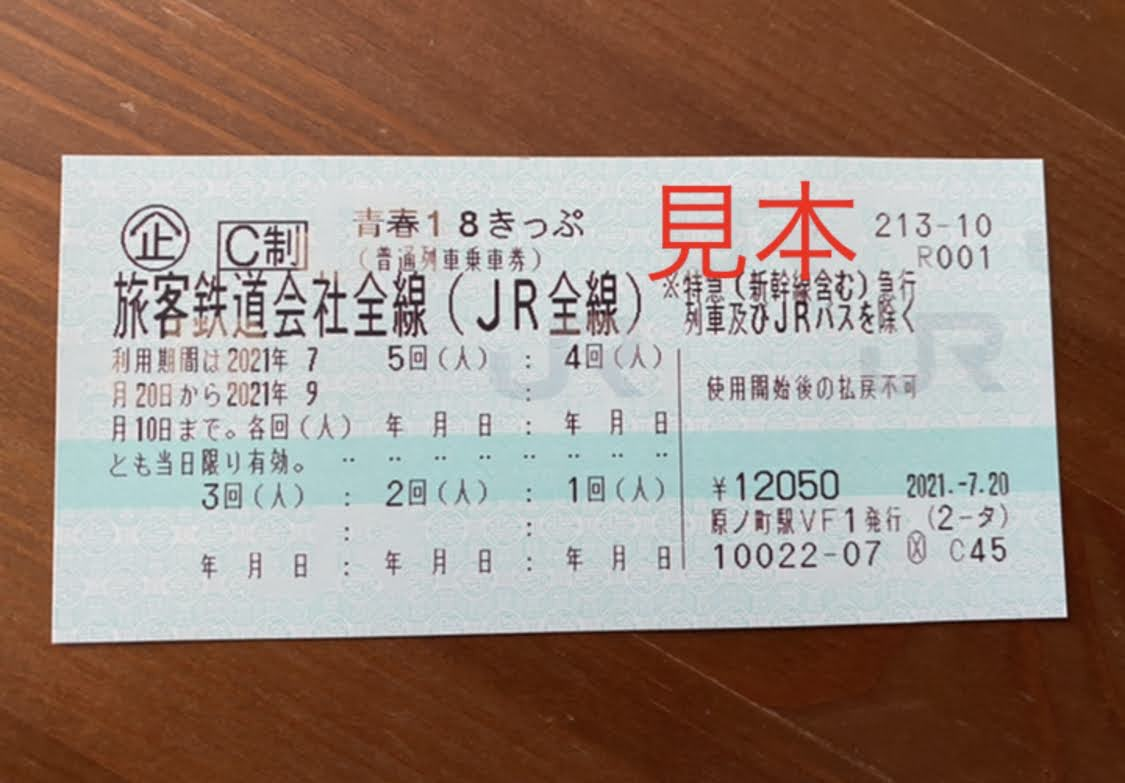
A Seishun 18 ticket issued in 2021
