= Zenshōji Station =

Railway station in Gero, Gifu Prefecture, Japan

Zenshōji Station 禅昌寺駅
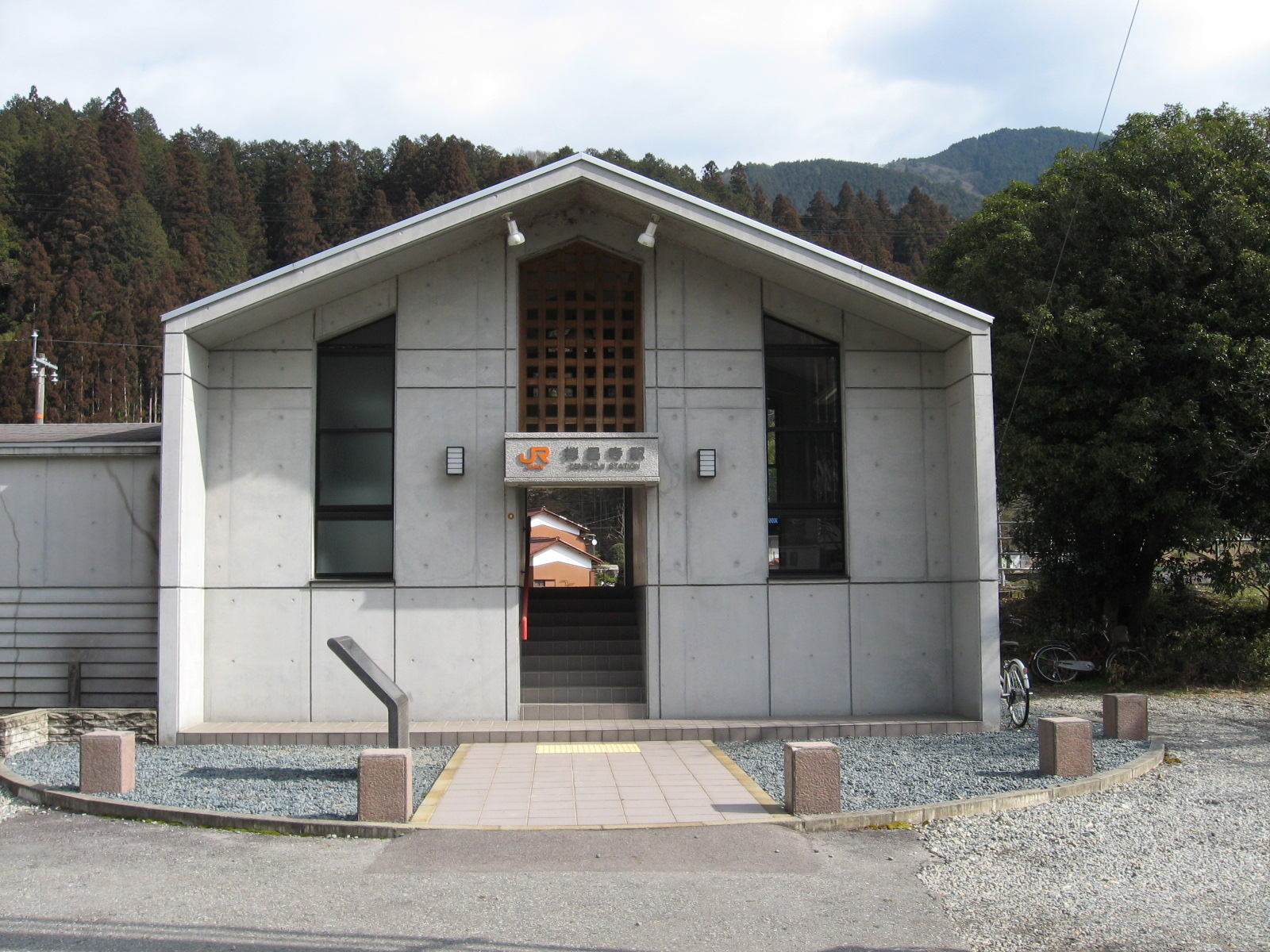
- Zenshōji Station in February 2007

General information
- Location: Hagiwara-cho Churo, Gero-shi, Gifu-ken 509-2514; Japan
- Coordinates: 35°50′57″N 137°13′31″E
- Operator: JR Central
- Line: ■ Takayama Main Line
- Distance: 93.5 km from Gifu
- Platforms: 1 side platform
- Tracks: 1

Other information
- Status: Unstaffed

History
- Opened: May 5, 1931; 95 years ago
Location
- Location within Gifu Prefecture Location within Japan

Zenshōji Station (禅昌寺駅, Zenshōji-eki) is a railway station on the Takayama Main Line in the city of Gero, Gifu Prefecture, Japan, operated by Central Japan Railway Company (JR Central).

== Lines ==
Zenshōji Station is served by the JR Central Takayama Main Line, and is located 93.5 kilometers from the official starting point of the line at Gifu.

== Station layout ==
Zenshōji Station has one ground-level side platform serving a single bi-directional track. The station is unattended.

== Adjacent stations ==
«	Service	»
Takayama Main Line
Limited Express "Hida": Does not stop at this station
Gero	Local	Hida-Hagiwara

== History ==
Zenshōji Station opened on May 5, 1931. The station was absorbed into the JR Central network upon the privatization of Japanese National Railways (JNR) on April 1, 1987.

== Surrounding area ==
- Hida River
- National Route 41

== See also ==
- List of railway stations in Japan
