= Gero, Gifu =

Gero 下呂市
- City
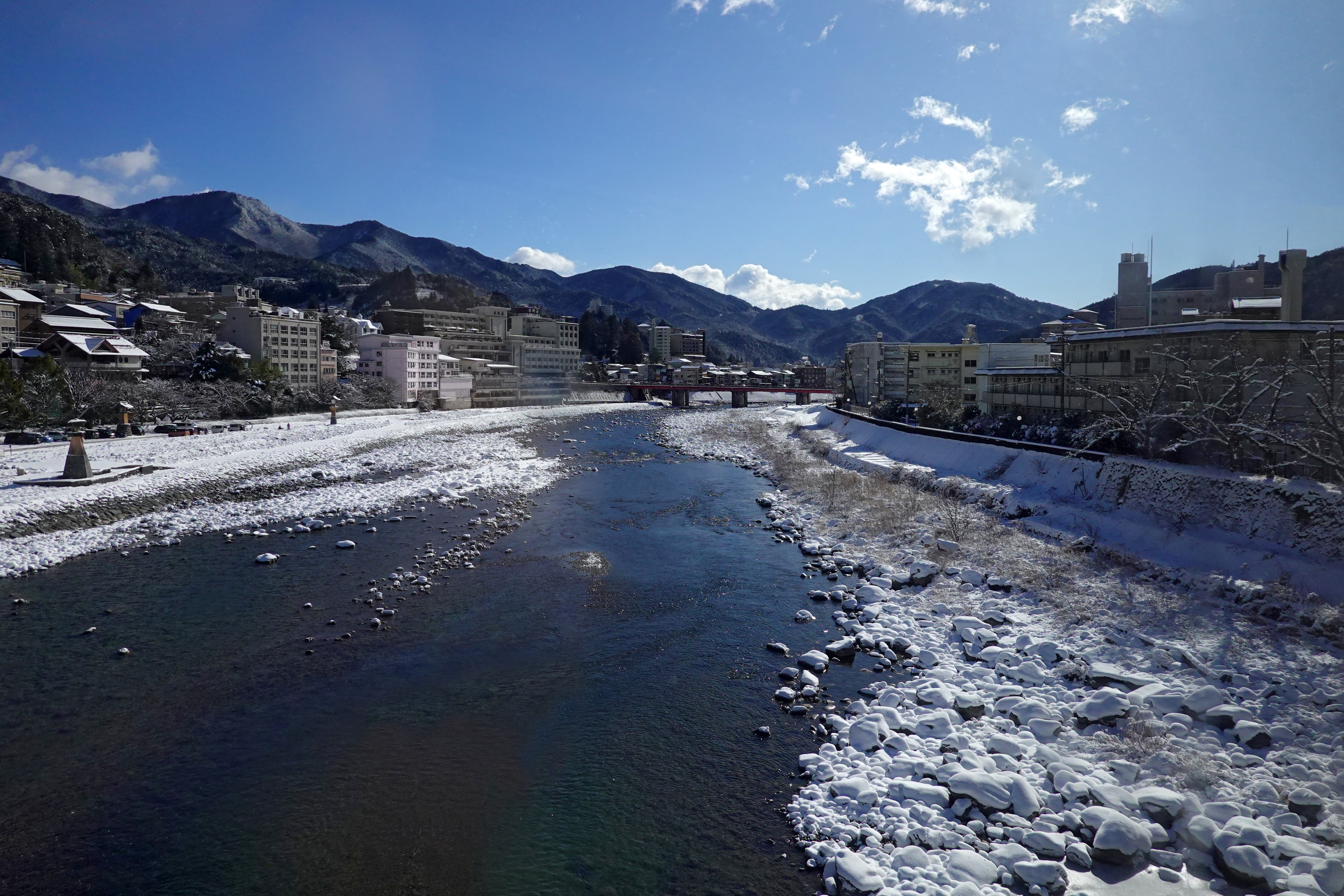
- Gero Onsen and Hida River

- Flag Emblem

- Location of Gero in Gifu Prefecture

- Coordinates: 35°48′21.2″N 137°14′38.9″E
- Country: Japan
- Region: Chūbu
- Prefecture: Gifu

Government
  - Mayor: Noboru Yamauchi

Area
  - Total: 851.21 km^{2} (328.65 sq mi)

Population (November 1, 2017)
  - Total: 33,283
  - Density: 39.101/km^{2} (101.27/sq mi)
- Time zone: UTC+9 (Japan Standard Time)
- Phone number: 0576-24-2222
- Address: 960 Mori, Gero-shi, Gifu-ken, Japan 509-2202
- Climate: Cfa
- Website: Official website
- Symbols
- Flower: Satsuki azalea
- Tree: Maple

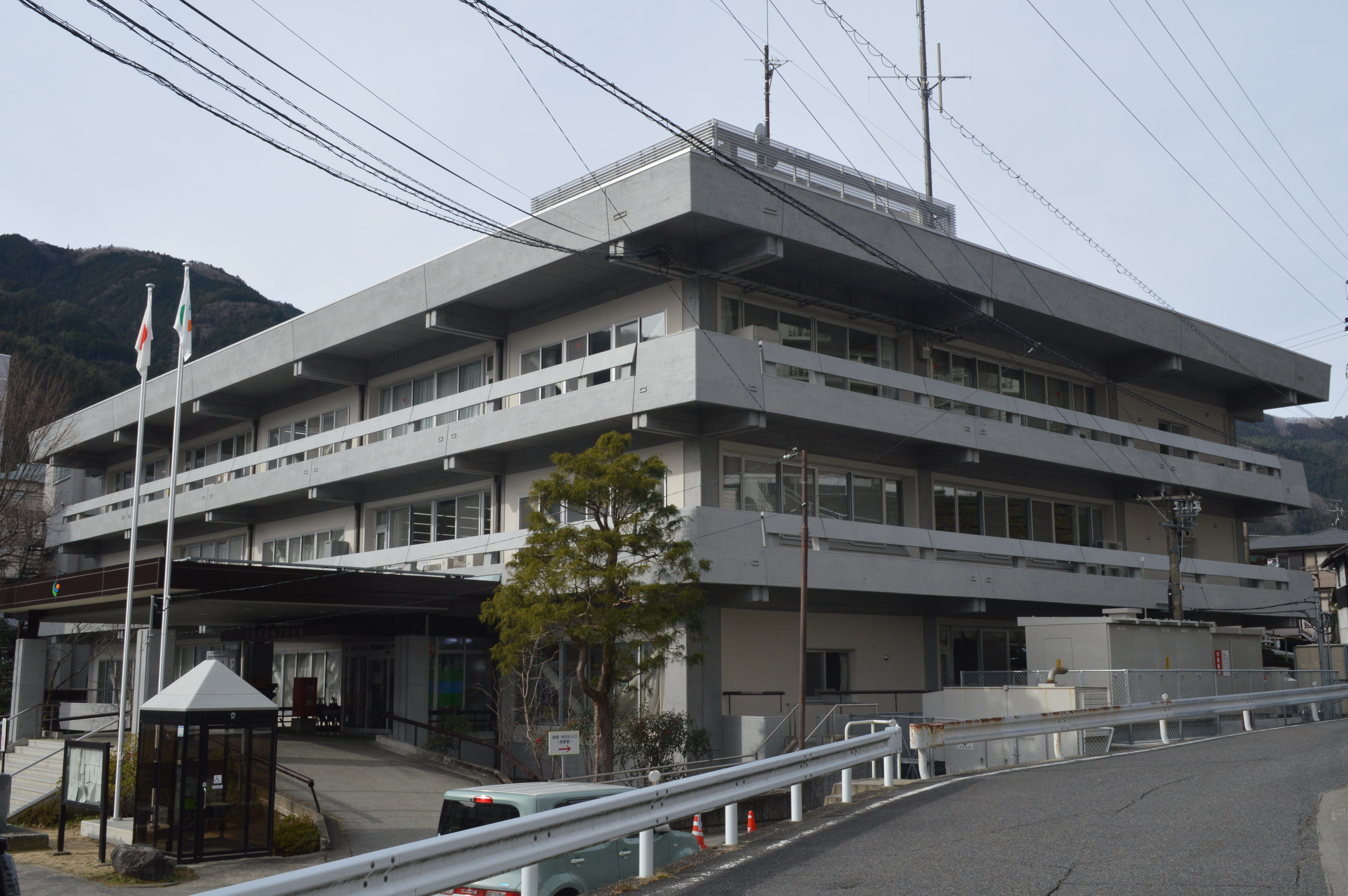
Gero City Hall

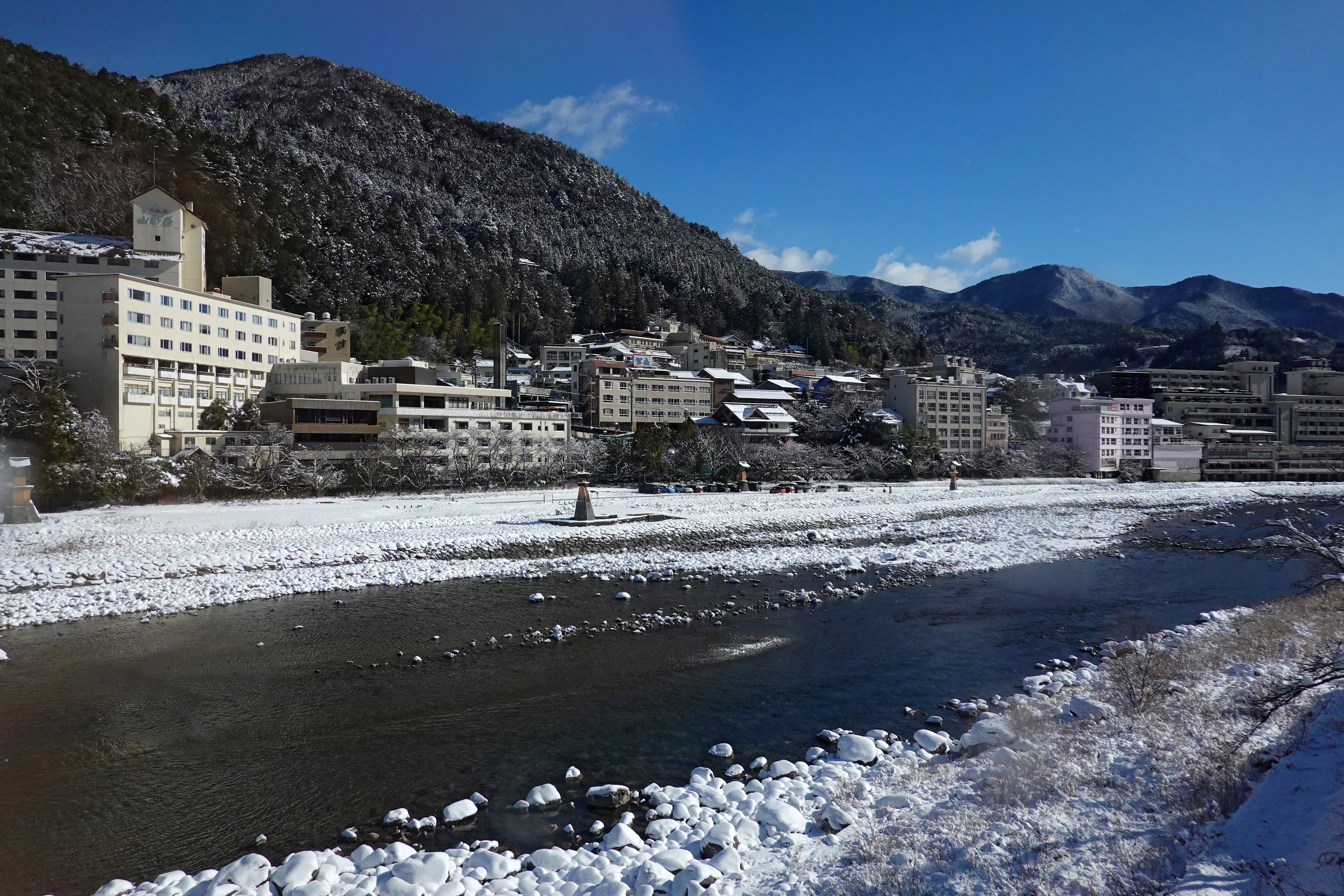
Hida River running through Gero

Gero (下呂市, Gero-shi) is a city located in Gifu, Japan. As of 31 October 2017, the city had an estimated population of 33,283, and a population density of 39 persons per km^{2} (101/sq mi), in 12,253 households. The total area of the city was 851.21 square kilometres (328.65 sq mi). The city is famous for its hot springs.

== Geography ==
The Hida River and the Maze River run throughout the city. Over 91% of the city area is covered by mountains and forest. Much of the city is within the borders of the Hida-Kisogawa Quasi-National Park. The volcano, Mount Ontake, is located in Gero.

=== Neighbouring municipalities ===
- Gifu Prefecture
  - Gujō
  - Hichisō
  - Nakatsugawa
  - Shirakawa
  - Seki
  - Takayama
- Nagano Prefecture
  - Kiso
  - Ōtaki

== Climate ==
The city has a climate characterized by hot and humid summers, and mild winters (Köppen climate classification Cfa). The average annual temperature in Gero is 12.2 °C (54.0 °F). The average annual rainfall is 2,440.3 mm (96.07 in) with July as the wettest month. The temperatures are highest on average in August, at around 24.5 °C (76.1 °F), and lowest in January, at around 0.3 °C (32.5 °F).

Climate data for Miyaji, Gero (1991–2020 normals, extremes 1978–present)
Month	Jan	Feb	Mar	Apr	May	Jun	Jul	Aug	Sep	Oct	Nov	Dec	Year
Record high °C (°F)	14.9 (58.8)	18.6 (65.5)	23.2 (73.8)	29.3 (84.7)	32.2 (90.0)	35.7 (96.3)	37.5 (99.5)	38.9 (102.0)	35.8 (96.4)	30.5 (86.9)	23.4 (74.1)	20.4 (68.7)	38.9 (102.0)
Mean daily maximum °C (°F)	5.3 (41.5)	7.0 (44.6)	11.5 (52.7)	17.7 (63.9)	22.9 (73.2)	25.9 (78.6)	29.4 (84.9)	31.0 (87.8)	26.8 (80.2)	20.8 (69.4)	14.2 (57.6)	7.9 (46.2)	18.4 (65.1)
Daily mean °C (°F)	0.3 (32.5)	1.1 (34.0)	4.8 (40.6)	10.5 (50.9)	15.9 (60.6)	19.9 (67.8)	23.6 (74.5)	24.5 (76.1)	20.7 (69.3)	14.5 (58.1)	8.0 (46.4)	2.6 (36.7)	12.2 (54.0)
Mean daily minimum °C (°F)	−3.8 (25.2)	−3.6 (25.5)	−0.6 (30.9)	4.2 (39.6)	9.8 (49.6)	15.2 (59.4)	19.6 (67.3)	20.3 (68.5)	16.4 (61.5)	9.8 (49.6)	3.3 (37.9)	−1.5 (29.3)	7.4 (45.3)
Record low °C (°F)	−14.1 (6.6)	−15.4 (4.3)	−10.7 (12.7)	−5.1 (22.8)	−0.8 (30.6)	5.7 (42.3)	11.9 (53.4)	11.6 (52.9)	5.3 (41.5)	−0.9 (30.4)	−5.3 (22.5)	−13.6 (7.5)	−15.4 (4.3)
Average precipitation mm (inches)	80.2 (3.16)	95.9 (3.78)	166.0 (6.54)	186.5 (7.34)	199.3 (7.85)	274.5 (10.81)	399.8 (15.74)	321.2 (12.65)	302.0 (11.89)	183.6 (7.23)	131.3 (5.17)	100.0 (3.94)	2,440.3 (96.07)
Average precipitation days (≥ 1.0 mm)	10.4	9.1	11.1	11.5	12.1	14.5	16.6	14.8	12.9	10.5	9.5	11.0	144.0
Mean monthly sunshine hours	150.2	161.3	186.9	197.5	196.6	146.0	155.5	185.4	160.3	167.3	158.2	147.3	2,025.4
Source: Japan Meteorological Agency (normals: 1991–2020, extremes: 1978–present)

Climate data for Hagiwara, Gero (1991–2020 normals, extremes 1976–present)
Month	Jan	Feb	Mar	Apr	May	Jun	Jul	Aug	Sep	Oct	Nov	Dec	Year
Record high °C (°F)	15.2 (59.4)	19.4 (66.9)	24.4 (75.9)	30.7 (87.3)	32.9 (91.2)	36.8 (98.2)	38.3 (100.9)	38.1 (100.6)	36.5 (97.7)	30.7 (87.3)	24.9 (76.8)	20.2 (68.4)	38.3 (100.9)
Mean daily maximum °C (°F)	5.1 (41.2)	6.6 (43.9)	11.2 (52.2)	17.4 (63.3)	22.9 (73.2)	26.0 (78.8)	29.4 (84.9)	31.1 (88.0)	26.7 (80.1)	20.7 (69.3)	14.2 (57.6)	7.9 (46.2)	18.3 (64.9)
Daily mean °C (°F)	0.6 (33.1)	1.3 (34.3)	5.1 (41.2)	10.9 (51.6)	16.3 (61.3)	20.2 (68.4)	23.7 (74.7)	24.8 (76.6)	20.9 (69.6)	14.9 (58.8)	8.5 (47.3)	3.1 (37.6)	12.5 (54.5)
Mean daily minimum °C (°F)	−2.8 (27.0)	−2.8 (27.0)	0.3 (32.5)	5.2 (41.4)	10.7 (51.3)	15.6 (60.1)	19.6 (67.3)	20.5 (68.9)	16.9 (62.4)	10.7 (51.3)	4.3 (39.7)	−0.4 (31.3)	8.1 (46.6)
Record low °C (°F)	−12.4 (9.7)	−12.1 (10.2)	−9.6 (14.7)	−3.4 (25.9)	1.4 (34.5)	7.2 (45.0)	12.6 (54.7)	11.9 (53.4)	7.4 (45.3)	0.7 (33.3)	−4.0 (24.8)	−12.1 (10.2)	−12.4 (9.7)
Average precipitation mm (inches)	83.2 (3.28)	93.2 (3.67)	175.4 (6.91)	197.0 (7.76)	216.0 (8.50)	292.5 (11.52)	445.6 (17.54)	322.3 (12.69)	334.3 (13.16)	198.8 (7.83)	139.8 (5.50)	110.1 (4.33)	2,588.8 (101.92)
Average precipitation days (≥ 1.0 mm)	9.9	8.7	11.5	11.1	11.8	14.0	15.9	13.7	13.1	10.5	9.5	11.3	140.9
Mean monthly sunshine hours	116.0	134.2	166.1	187.7	201.0	155.3	155.3	193.0	148.8	150.5	127.7	114.5	1,849.4
Source: Japan Meteorological Agency (normals: 1991–2020, extremes: 1976–present)

Climate data for Kanayama, Gero (1991–2020 normals, extremes 1978–present)
Month	Jan	Feb	Mar	Apr	May	Jun	Jul	Aug	Sep	Oct	Nov	Dec	Year
Record high °C (°F)	17.4 (63.3)	21.0 (69.8)	25.3 (77.5)	29.7 (85.5)	34.1 (93.4)	37.8 (100.0)	39.4 (102.9)	41.0 (105.8)	38.3 (100.9)	32.4 (90.3)	25.3 (77.5)	21.5 (70.7)	41.0 (105.8)
Mean daily maximum °C (°F)	7.2 (45.0)	8.7 (47.7)	13.0 (55.4)	18.7 (65.7)	23.6 (74.5)	26.6 (79.9)	30.0 (86.0)	31.9 (89.4)	27.7 (81.9)	22.0 (71.6)	15.8 (60.4)	9.7 (49.5)	19.6 (67.3)
Daily mean °C (°F)	1.7 (35.1)	2.4 (36.3)	6.2 (43.2)	11.6 (52.9)	16.8 (62.2)	20.7 (69.3)	24.2 (75.6)	25.5 (77.9)	21.7 (71.1)	15.6 (60.1)	9.3 (48.7)	4.0 (39.2)	13.3 (55.9)
Mean daily minimum °C (°F)	−2.2 (28.0)	−2.1 (28.2)	0.7 (33.3)	5.5 (41.9)	11.0 (51.8)	16.3 (61.3)	20.2 (68.4)	21.3 (70.3)	17.7 (63.9)	11.3 (52.3)	4.9 (40.8)	0.1 (32.2)	8.7 (47.7)
Record low °C (°F)	−11.3 (11.7)	−12.9 (8.8)	−9.4 (15.1)	−3.2 (26.2)	0.5 (32.9)	6.0 (42.8)	13.5 (56.3)	14.3 (57.7)	7.3 (45.1)	0.3 (32.5)	−3.3 (26.1)	−7.8 (18.0)	−12.9 (8.8)
Average precipitation mm (inches)	76.2 (3.00)	89.6 (3.53)	163.1 (6.42)	186.3 (7.33)	196.8 (7.75)	252.9 (9.96)	352.6 (13.88)	259.0 (10.20)	290.8 (11.45)	174.3 (6.86)	115.8 (4.56)	89.1 (3.51)	2,221.7 (87.47)
Average precipitation days (≥ 1.0 mm)	9.7	8.9	10.5	11.1	11.0	13.6	15.4	12.8	12.6	10.2	8.7	9.9	134.3
Mean monthly sunshine hours	143.5	159.6	187.7	190.0	196.5	151.1	156.3	190.1	152.1	161.4	147.8	141.2	1,975.8
Source: Japan Meteorological Agency (normals: 1991–2020, extremes: 1978–present)

== Demographics ==
Per Japanese census data, the population of Gero has declined over the past 50 years.

Historical population
Year	Pop.	±%
1970	44,254	—
1980	42,581	−3.8%
1990	41,576	−2.4%
2000	40,102	−3.5%
2010	36,314	−9.4%
2020	30,428	−16.2%

== History ==
The area around Gero was part of traditional Hida Province. During the Edo period, it was part of the tenryō controlled directly by the Tokugawa shogunate. During the post-Meiji restoration cadastral reforms, the area was organised into Mashita District, Gifu. The village of Gero was created on July 1, 1889, with the establishment of the modern municipalities system. It was raised to town status on January 1, 1925. Gero merged with the towns of Hagiwara, Kanayama and Osaka, and the village of Maze (all from Mashita District) on March 1, 2004, to form the city of Gero.

== Government ==
Gero has a mayor-council form of government with a directly elected mayor and a unicameral city legislature of 14 members.

== Economy ==
Gero's major industry is tourism. It is known throughout Japan for its onsen, which are mentioned even in the Nara period Shoku Nihongi. Gero has many hotels that can be visited by guests that are looking for accommodations near the hot springs. Large tubs are located in some hotels allowing couples to bathe together. Some hotels lend yukatas to the couples. It's not unusual to see people wearing yukatas on the streets and even in stores. Besides those in hotels, there are many inexpensive and convenient onsens located near railway stations, residential areas, and commercial centers up and down the valley. Forestry and agriculture also play significant roles in the local economy.

== Education ==
Gero has 13 public elementary schools and six public middle schools operated by the city government, and one public high school operated by the Gifu Prefectural Board of Education. The prefecture also operates two special education schools.

== Transportation ==
=== Railway ===
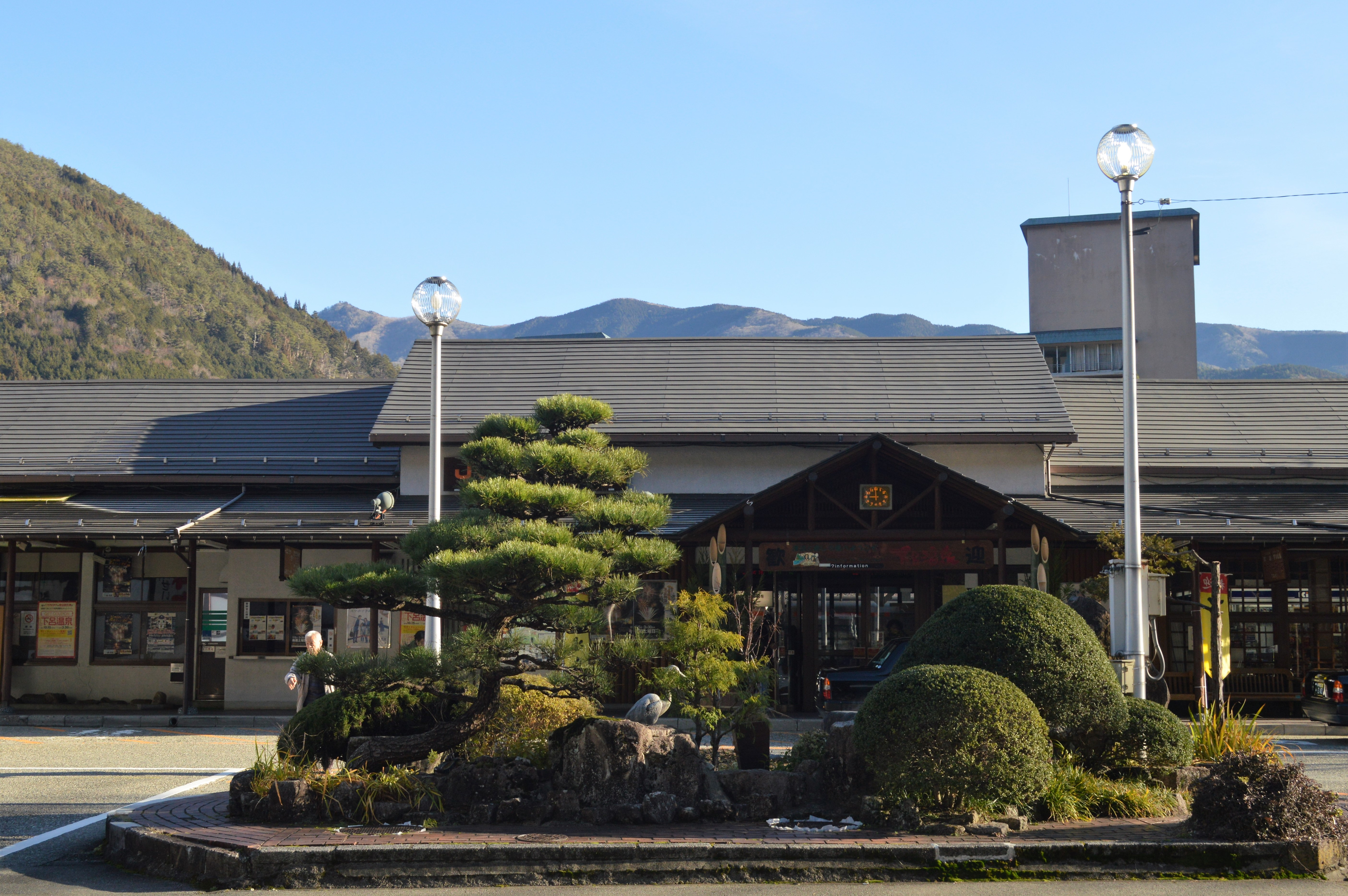
Gero Station

JR Tōkai - Takayama Main Line

- Hida-Kanayama - Yakeishi - Gero - Zenshōji - Hida-Hagiwara - Jōro - Hida-Miyada - Hida-Osaka

=== Highway ===
- National Route 41
- National Route 256
- National Route 257

== Sister cities ==
=== International ===
- Ketchikan, Alaska, United States
- Pensacola, Florida, United States
- (São Paulo (state)) Salesópolis, São Paulo, Brazil

=== Domestic ===
- Hodatsushimizu, Hakui District, Ishikawa Prefecture
- Ichinomiya, Aichi Prefecture

== In popular culture ==
The Kanayama area of Gero served as the primary inspiration for the fictional town of Ebisugaoka in the horror video game Silent Hill f (2025). Writer Ryukishi07 chose Kanayama for its distinctive architecture and labyrinthine alleyways, and the development team visited the area to photograph buildings and record ambient sounds of daily life for use as reference materials. To accurately portray the setting of rural Japan in the 1960s, the developers conducted historical research and adjusted the environment design accordingly.
