= Kuguno Station =

Railway station in Takayama, Gifu Prefecture, Japan

Kuguno Station 久々野駅
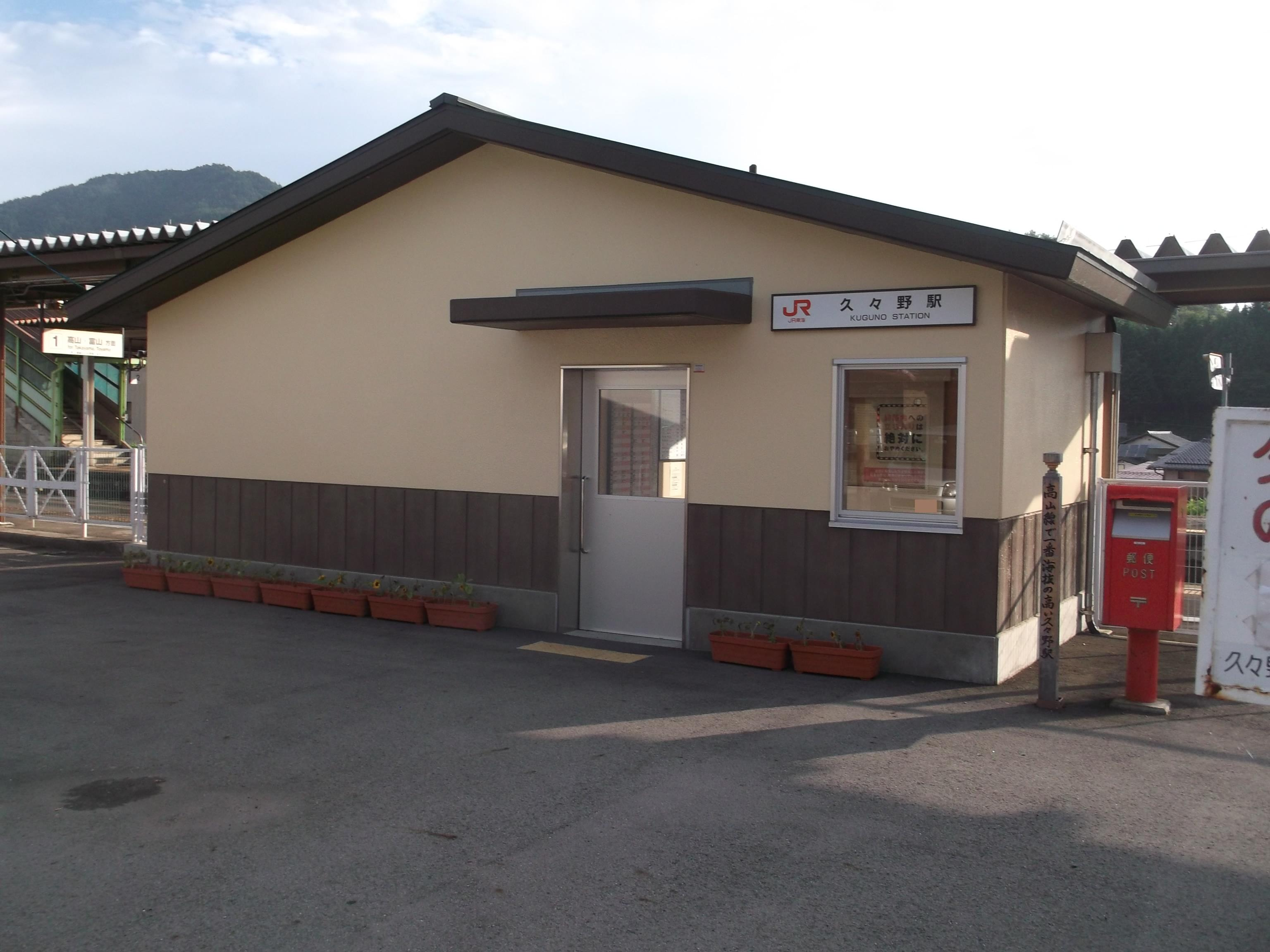
- Kuguno Station in August 2013

General information
- Location: Kuguno-cho Kuguno, Takayama-shi, Gifu-ken 509-3205; Japan
- Coordinates: 36.0522°N 137.2770°E
- Operator: JR Central
- Line: Takayama Main Line
- Distance: 123.2 km from Gifu
- Platforms: 1 side + 1 island platform
- Tracks: 3

Other information
- Status: Unstaffed

History
- Opened: October 25, 1934; 91 years ago

Passengers
- FY2016: 209 daily
Location
- Location within Gifu Prefecture Location within Japan

Kuguno Station (久々野駅, Kuguno-eki) is a railway station on the Takayama Main Line in the city of Takayama, Gifu Prefecture, Japan, operated by Central Japan Railway Company (JR Central).

== Lines ==
Kuguno Station is served by the JR Central Takayama Main Line, and is located 123.2 kilometers from the official starting point of the line at Gifu.

== Station layout ==
Kuguno Station has one ground-level island platform and one ground-level side platform connected by a level crossing. The station is unattended.

=== Platforms ===
1	■ Takayama Main Line	for Takayama and Toyama
2	■ Takayama Main Line	for Gero and Gifu
3	■ Takayama Main Line	for Takayama and Toyama

== Adjacent stations ==
«	Service	»
Takayama Main Line
Nagisa	Local	Hida-Ichinomiya
Hida-Osaka or Hida-Hagiwara	Limited Express Hida	Takayama

== History ==
Kuguno Station opened on October 25, 1934. The station was absorbed into the JR Central network upon the privatization of Japanese National Railways (JNR) on April 1, 1987. A new station building was completed in March 2015.

== Passenger statistics ==
In fiscal 2016, the station was used by an average of 209 passengers daily (boarding passengers only).

== Surrounding area ==
- Kuguno Elementary School
- Kuguno Junior High School

== See also ==
- List of railway stations in Japan
