= Hida-Miyada Station =

Railway station in Gero, Gifu Prefecture, Japan

Hida-Miyada Station 飛騨宮田駅
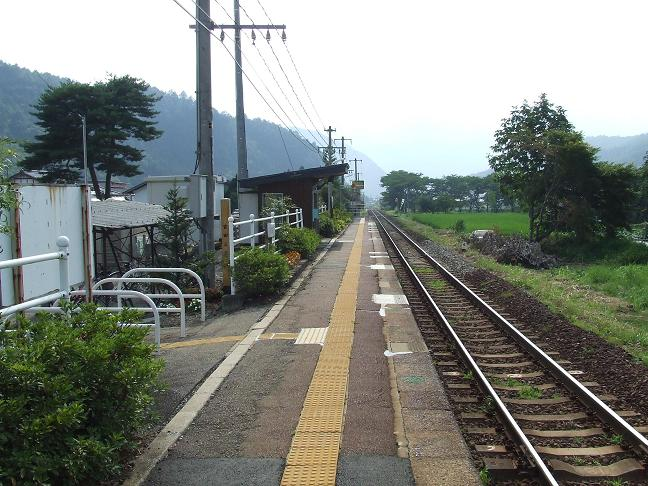
- Hida-Miyada Station in August 2008

General information
- Location: 1610 Hagiwara Jōro, Gero-shi, Gifu-ken 509-2518; Japan
- Coordinates: 35.9288°N 137.2361°E
- Operator: JR Central
- Line: Takayama Main Line
- Distance: 105.4 km from Gifu
- Platforms: 1 side platform
- Tracks: 1

Other information
- Status: Unstaffed

History
- Opened: October 1, 1955; 70 years ago
Location
- Location within Gifu Prefecture Location within Japan

Hida-Miyada Station (飛騨宮田駅, Hida-Miyada-eki) is a railway station on the Takayama Main Line in the city of Gero, Gifu Prefecture, Japan, operated by Central Japan Railway Company (JR Central).

== Lines ==
Hida-Miyada Station is served by the JR Central Takayama Main Line, and is located 105.4 kilometers from the official starting point of the line at Gifu.

== Station layout ==
Hida-Miyada Station has one ground-level side platform serving a single bi-directional track. The station is unattended.

== Adjacent stations ==
| « | Service | » |
Takayama Main Line
Limited Express "Hida": Does not stop at this station
| Jōro | Local | Hida-Osaka |

== History ==
Hida-Miyada Station opened on October 1, 1955. The station was absorbed into the JR Central network upon the privatization of Japanese National Railways (JNR) on April 1, 1987.

== Surrounding area ==
- National Route 41
- Miyada Elementary School

== See also ==
- List of railway stations in Japan
