= Mashita District, Gifu =

Former district in Gifu prefecture, Japan

Mashita District (益田郡, Mashita-gun) was a district located in Gifu, Japan. All towns and villages in the district merged to form the city of Gero on March 1, 2004, and the district no longer exists as an independent entity.

As of 2000 , the district had an estimated population of 40,102 and a population density of 47.1 persons per km^{2}. The total area was 851 km^{2}.

== District Timeline ==
- April 1, 1950-The district transferred the villages of Asahi and Takane to Ōno District (both of the villages were later merged into the city of Takayama on February 1, 2005).
- March 1, 2004-The district dissolved when all municipalities within the district merged to form the city of Gero.
  - Gero (town)
  - Hagiwara
  - Kanayama
  - Osaka
  - Maze
