= Hida-Ichinomiya Station =

Railway station in Takayama, Gifu Prefecture, Japan

Hida-Ichinomiya Station 飛騨一ノ宮駅
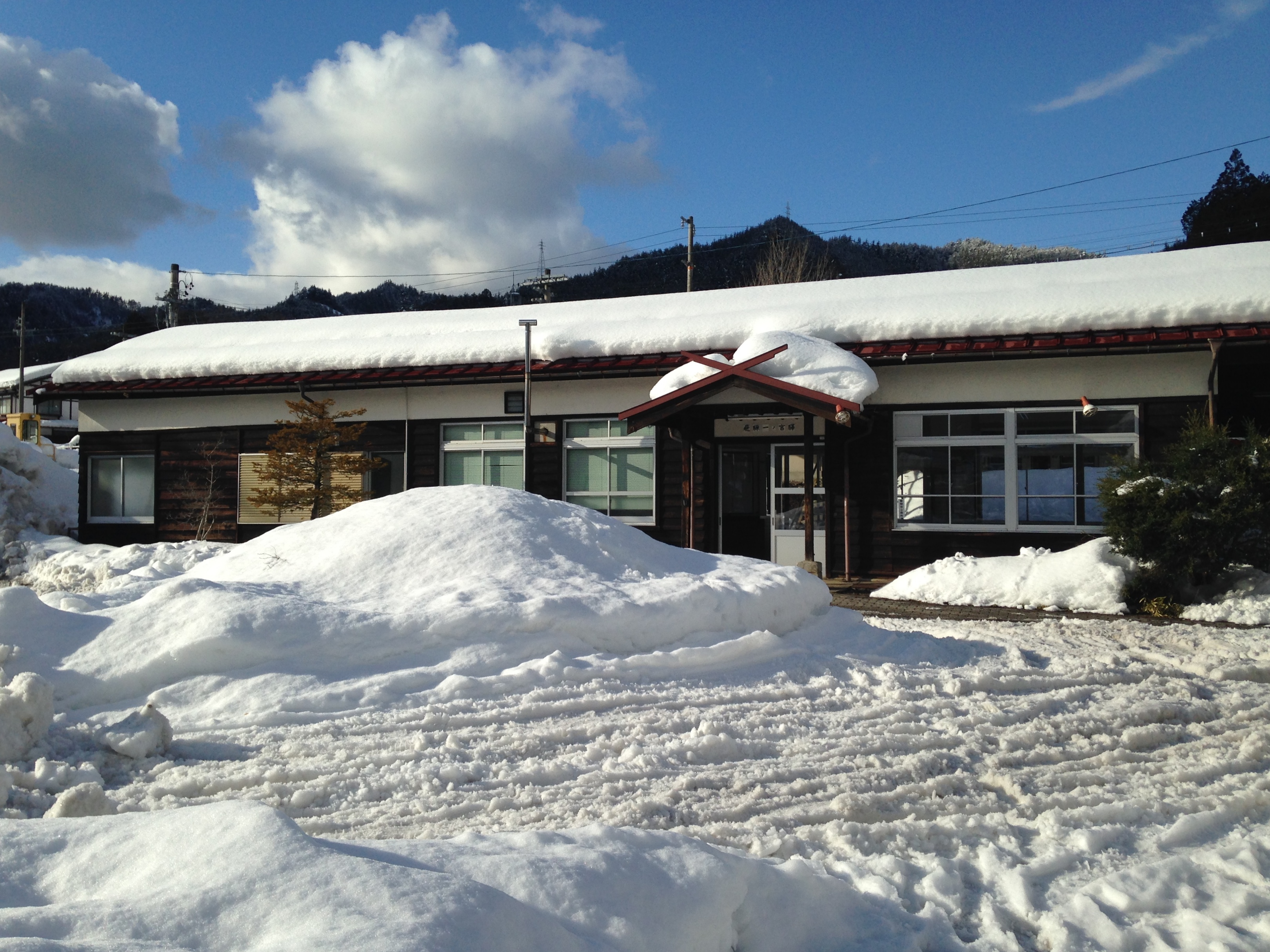
- Hida-Ichinomiya Station in January 2015

General information
- Location: Ichinomiya-cho, Takayama-shi, Gifu-ken 509-3505; Japan
- Coordinates: 36.0883°N 137.2483°E
- Operator: JR Central
- Line: Takayama Main Line
- Distance: 129.5 km from Gifu
- Platforms: 1 island + 1 side platform
- Tracks: 3

History
- Opened: October 25, 1934; 91 years ago

Passengers
- FY2016: 30 daily
Location
- Location within Gifu Prefecture Location within Japan

Hida-Ichinomiya Station (飛騨一ノ宮駅, Hida-Ichinomiya-eki) is a railway station on the Takayama Main Line in the city of Takayama, Gifu Prefecture, Japan, operated by Central Japan Railway Company (JR Central).

== Lines ==
Hida-Ichinomiya Station is served by the JR Central Takayama Main Line and is located 129.5 kilometers from the official starting point of the line at Gifu.

== Station layout ==
Hida-Ichinomiya Station has one ground-level island platform and one ground-level side platform connected by a footbridge.

=== Platforms ===
| 1 | ■ Takayama Main Line | for Gero and Gifu |
| 2 | ■ Takayama Main Line | for Takayama and Toyama |
| 3 | ■ Takayama Main Line | (not normally used) |

== Adjacent stations ==
| « | Service | » |
Takayama Main Line
Limited Express "Hida": Does not stop at this station
| Kuguno | Local | Takayama |

== History ==
Hida-Ichinomiya Station opened on October 25, 1934. The station was absorbed into the JR Central network upon the privatization of Japanese National Railways (JNR) on April 1, 1987.

== Passenger statistics ==
In fiscal 2016, the station was used by an average of 30 passengers daily (boarding passengers only).

== Surrounding area ==
- National Route 41
- Minashi Shrine

== See also ==
- List of railway stations in Japan
