= Nagisa Station (Gifu) =

Railway station in Takayama, Gifu Prefecture, Japan

Nagisa Station 渚駅
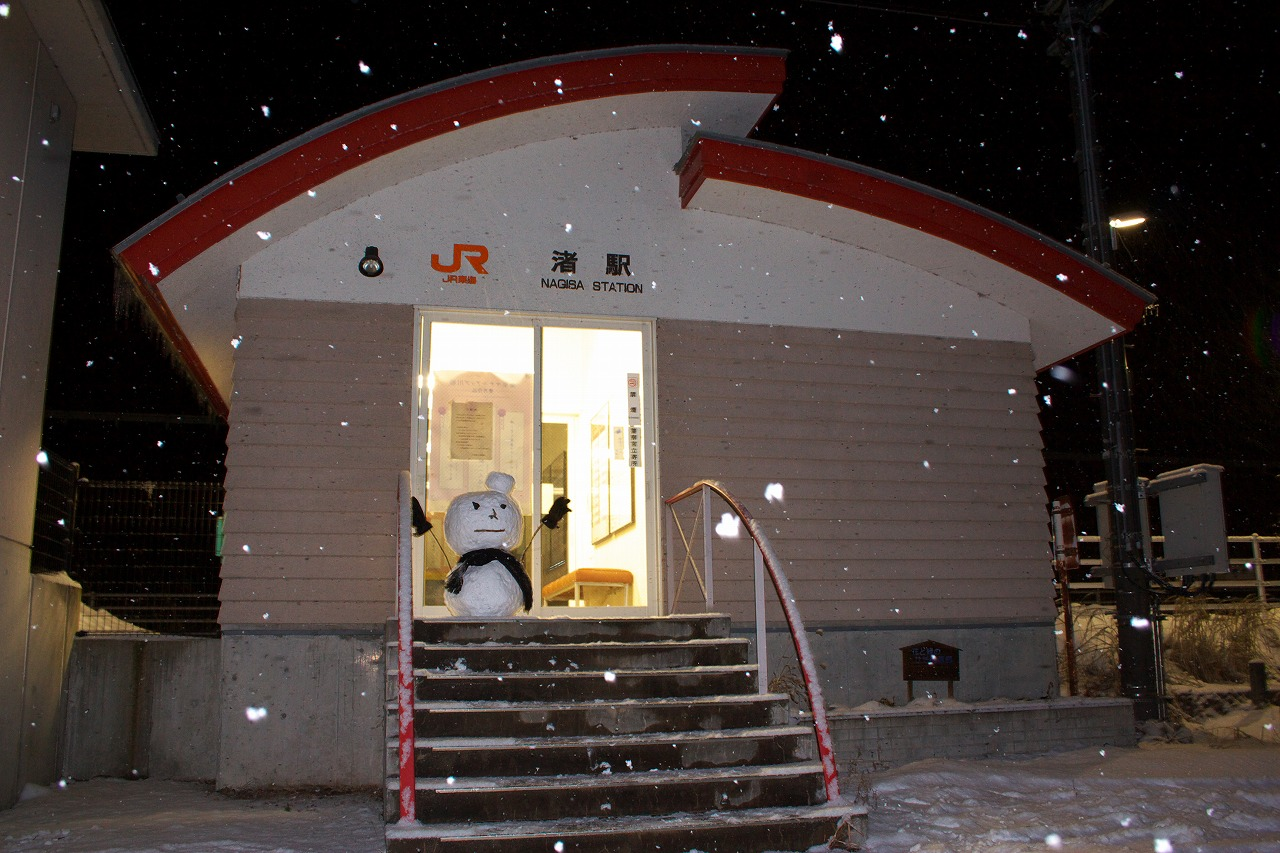
- Nagisa Station in January 2009

General information
- Location: Kuguno-cho Nagisa, Takayama-shi, Gifu-ken 509-3213; Japan
- Coordinates: 36°0′5.17″N 137°17′16.97″E
- Operator: JR Central
- Line: Takayama Main Line
- Distance: 115.9 km from Gifu
- Platforms: 2 side platforms
- Tracks: 2

Other information
- Status: Unstaffed

History
- Opened: October 25, 1934; 91 years ago
- Rebuilt: 1998; 28 years ago
Location
- Location within Gifu Prefecture Location within Japan

Nagisa Station (渚駅, Nagisa-eki) is a railway station on the Takayama Main Line in the city of Takayama, Gifu Prefecture, Japan, operated by Central Japan Railway Company (JR Central).

== Lines ==
Nagisa Station is served by the JR Central Takayama Main Line, and is located 115.9 kilometers from the official starting point of the line at Gifu.

== Station layout ==
Nagisa Station has two opposed ground-level side platforms connected by a footbridge. The station is unattended.

=== Platforms ===
1	■ Takayama Main Line	for Gero and Gifu
2	■ Takayama Main Line	for Takayama and Toyama

== Adjacent stations ==
«	Service	»
Takayama Main Line
Limited Express "Hida": Does not stop at this station
Hida-Osaka	Local	Kuguno

== History ==
Nagisa Station opened on October 25, 1934. The station was absorbed into the JR Central network upon the privatization of Japanese National Railways (JNR) on April 1, 1987. A new station building was completed in February 1998.

== Surrounding area ==
The station is located in a rural area with a few houses nearby.

== See also ==
- List of railway stations in Japan
