= Hida-Hagiwara Station =

Railway station in Gero, Gifu Prefecture, Japan

Hida-Hagiwara Station 飛騨萩原駅
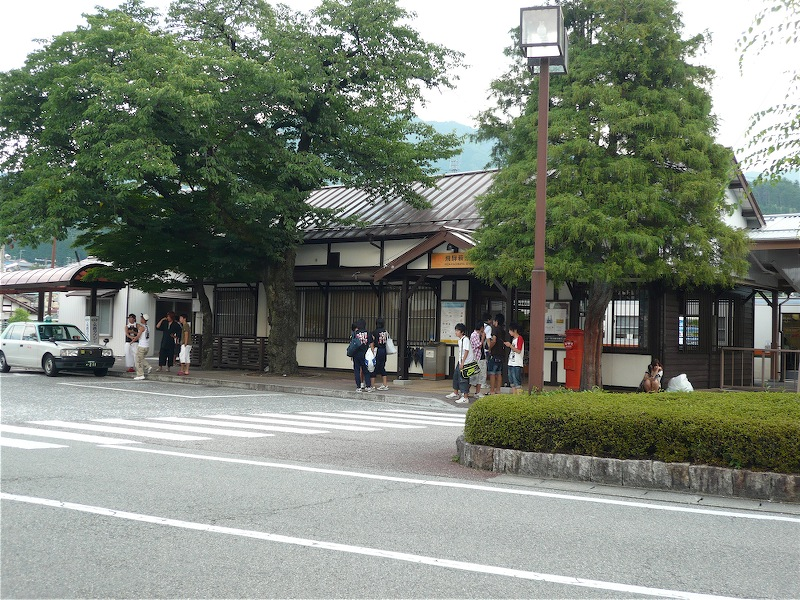
- Hida-Hagiwara Station in August 2008

General information
- Location: Hagiwara-cho Hagiwara, Gero-shi, Gifu-ken 509–2517; Japan
- Coordinates: 35.8745°N 137.2130°E
- Operator: JR Central
- Line: Takayama Main Line
- Distance: 96.7 km from Gifu
- Platforms: 1 side + 1 island platform
- Tracks: 3

Other information
- Status: Staffed

History
- Opened: May 9, 1931; 95 years ago

Passengers
- FY2015: 434
Location
- Location within Gifu Prefecture Location within Japan

Hida-Hagiwara Station (飛騨萩原駅, Hida-Hagiwara-eki) is a railway station on the Takayama Main Line in Gero, Gifu Prefecture, Japan. It is operated by Central Japan Railway Company (JR Central).

== Lines ==
Hida-Hagiwara Station is served by the JR Central Takayama Main Line, and is located 96.7 kilometers from the official starting point of the line at Gifu.

== Station layout ==
Hida-Hagiwara Station has one ground-level island platform and one ground-level side platform connected by a footbridge. The station is staffed.

=== Platforms ===
1	■ Takayama Main Line	for Takayama and Toyama
2	■ Takayama Main Line	for Gero and Gifu
3	■ Takayama Main Line	(starting trains)

== Adjacent stations ==
«	Service	»
Takayama Main Line
Zenshōji	Local	Jōro
Gero	Limited Express Hida	Hida-Osaka

== History ==
Hida-Hagiwara Station opened on May 9, 1931. The station was absorbed into the JR Central network upon the privatization of Japanese National Railways (JNR) on April 1, 1987.

== Passenger statistics ==
In fiscal 2015, the station was used by an average of 434 passengers daily (boarding passengers only).

== Surrounding area ==
- Ruins of Hagiwara-Suwa Castle
- National Route 41

== See also ==
- List of railway stations in Japan
