= Hida-Osaka Station =

Railway station in Gero, Gifu Prefecture, Japan

Hida-Osaka Station 飛騨小坂駅
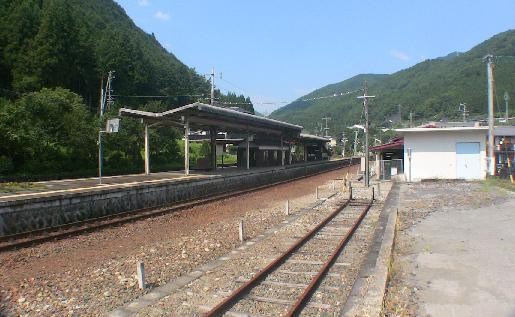
- Hida-Osaka Station in August 2009

General information
- Location: Osaka-machi, Oshima, Gero-shi, Gifu-ken 509-3106; Japan
- Coordinates: 35.9510°N 137.2571°E
- Operator: JR Central
- Line: Takayama Main Line
- Distance: 108.8 km from Gifu
- Platforms: 1 island platform
- Tracks: 2

Other information
- Status: Unstaffed

History
- Opened: August 25, 1933; 93 years ago
Location
- Location within Gifu Prefecture Location within Japan

Hida-Osaka Station (飛騨小坂駅, Hida-Osaka-eki) is a railway station on the Takayama Main Line in the city of Gero, Gifu Prefecture, Japan, operated by Central Japan Railway Company (JR Central).

== Lines ==
Hida-Osaka Station is served by the JR Central Takayama Main Line, and is located 108.8 kilometers from the official starting point of the line at Gifu.

== Station layout ==
Hida-Osaka Station has one ground-level island platform connected to the station building by a level crossing. The station is unattended.

=== Platforms ===
1	■ Takayama Main Line	for Gero and Gifu
2	■ Takayama Main Line	for Takayama and Toyama

== Adjacent stations ==
«	Service	»
Takayama Main Line
Hida-Miyada	Local	Nagisa
Hida-Hagiwara	Limited Express Hida	Kuguno or Takayama

== History ==
Hida-Osaka Station opened on August 25, 1933. The station was absorbed into the JR Central network upon the privatization of Japanese National Railways (JNR) on April 1, 1987.

== Surrounding area ==
- National Route 41
- Hida River

== See also ==
- List of railway stations in Japan
