= Takayama Station =

Railway station in Takayama, Gifu Prefecture, Japan

Takayama Station 高山駅
- Takayama Station viewed from above facing north in September 2026.

General information
- Location: 1-22-2 Showa-cho, Takayama City, Gifu Prefecture 509-0141; Japan
- Coordinates: 36.1406°N 137.2519°E
- Operator: JR Central
- Line: Takayama Line
- Distance: 136.4 km (84.8 mi) from Gifu
- Platforms: 1 side + 1 island platform
- Tracks: 3

Construction
- Structure type: At grade
- Architect: Hiroshi Naito

Other information
- Status: Staffed (Midori no Madoguchi)

History
- Opened: October 25, 1934; 91 years ago

Passengers
- FY2015: 1,539 daily

Services
Preceding station	JR Central	Following station
Hida-Ichinomiya towards Gifu	Takayama Line Local	Hozue towards Toyama
Location
- Location within Gifu Prefecture Location within Chubu region Location within Japan

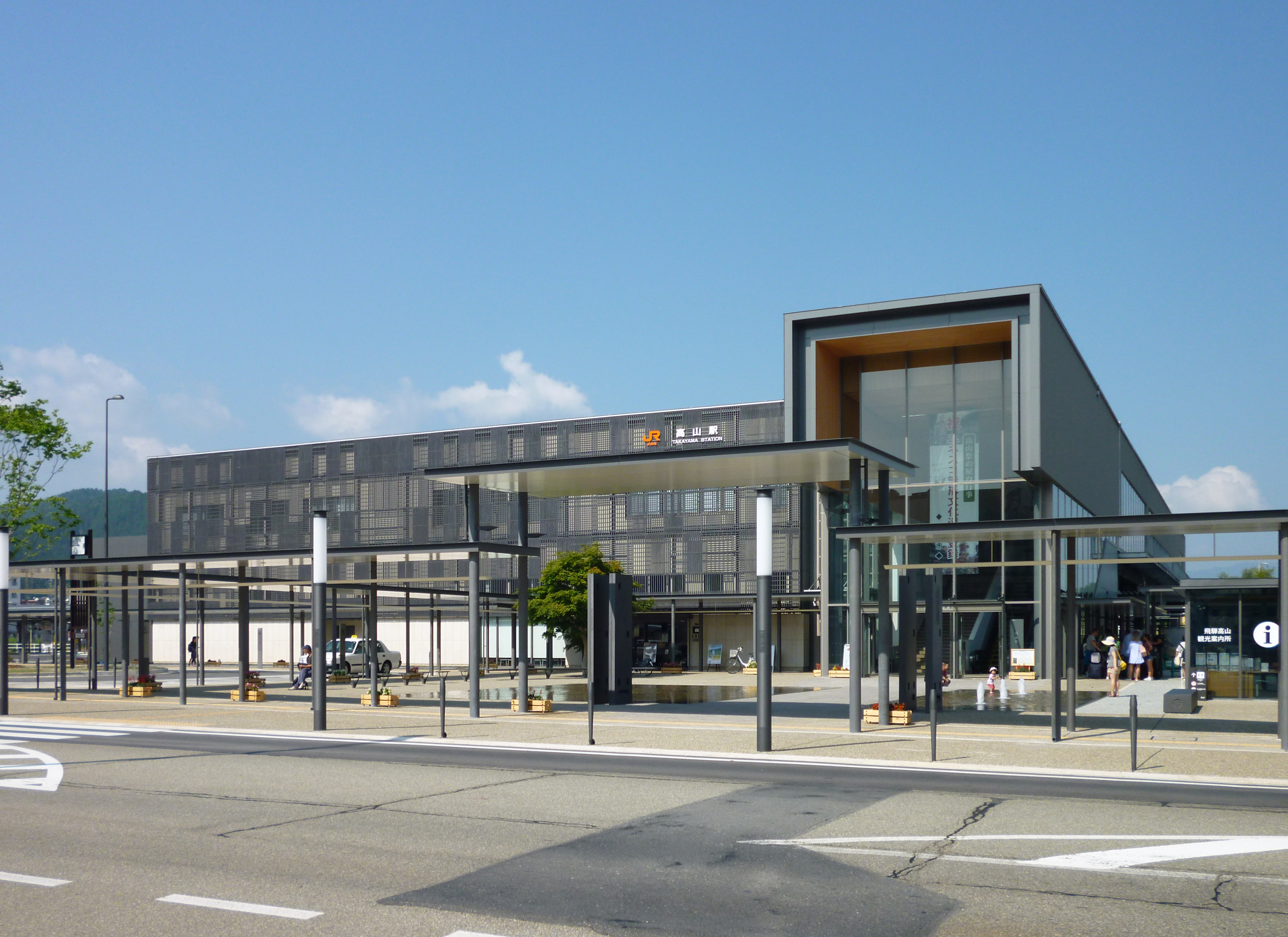
The east side of Takayama Station in August 2018

Takayama Station (高山駅, Takayama-eki) is a railway station on the Takayama Main Line in the city of Takayama, Gifu Prefecture, Japan, operated by Central Japan Railway Company (JR Central).

== Lines ==
Takayama Station is served by the JR Central Takayama Main Line, and is located 136.4 kilometers from the official starting point of the line at Gifu.

== Station layout ==
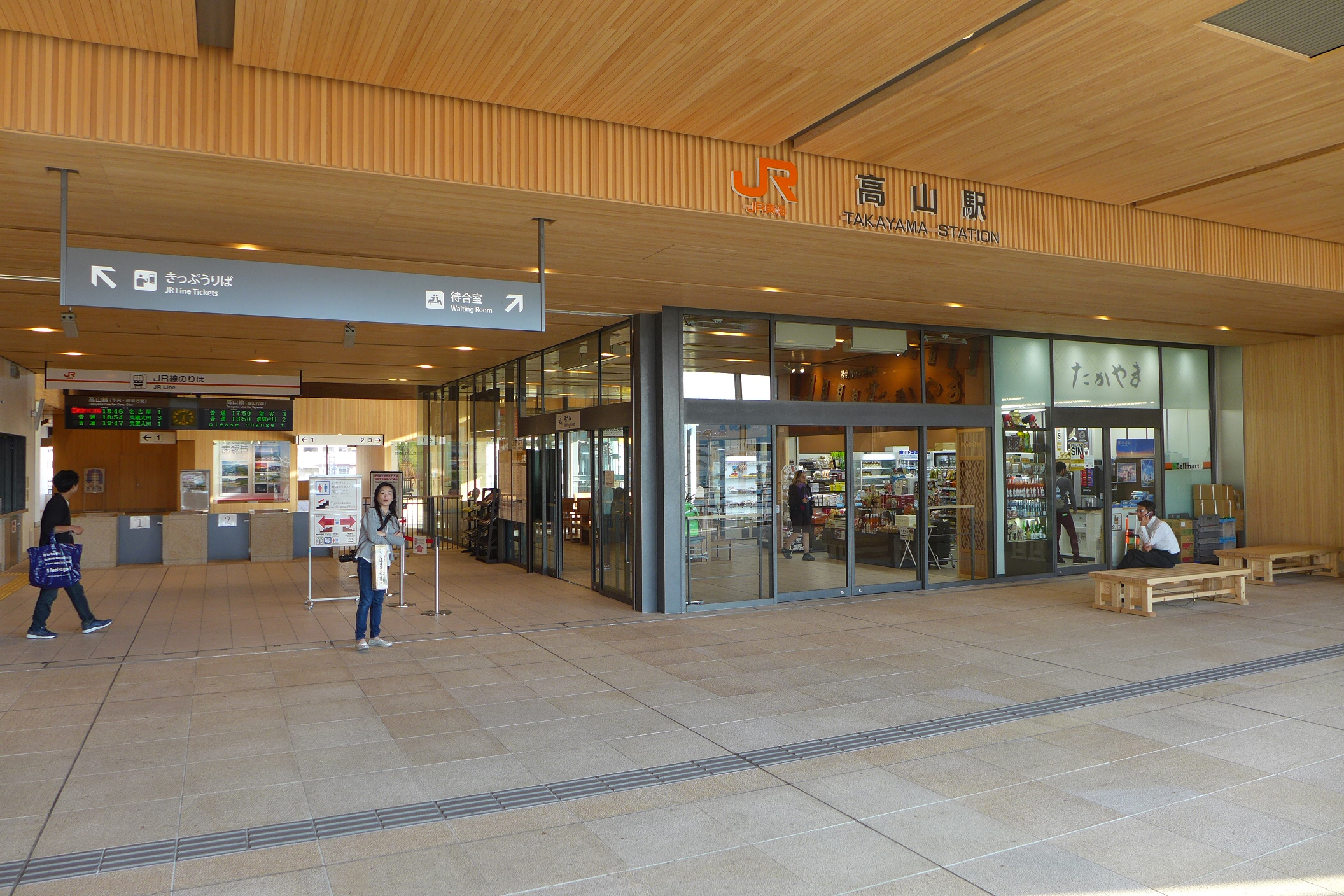
Entry Gate

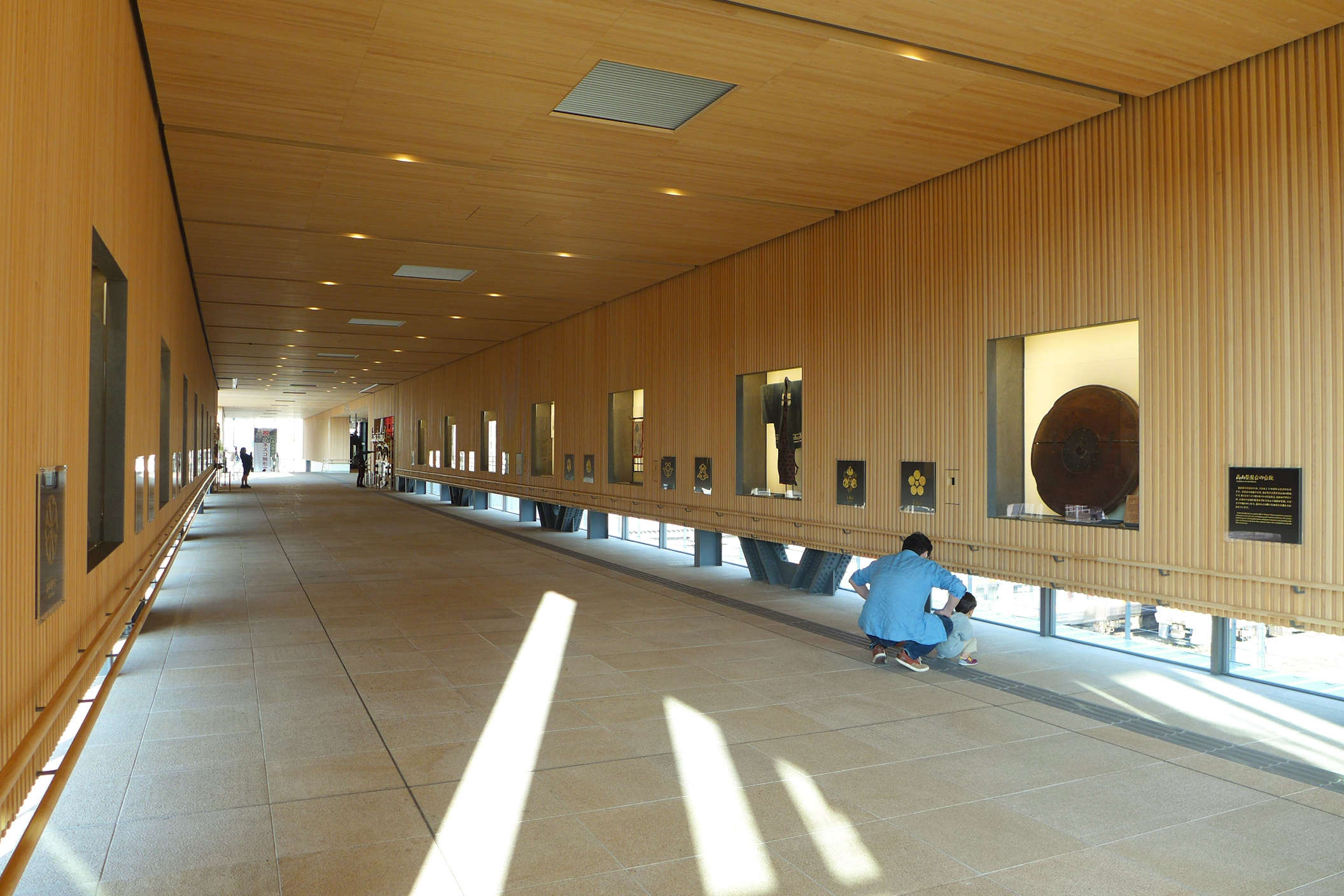
Access showing the exhibit

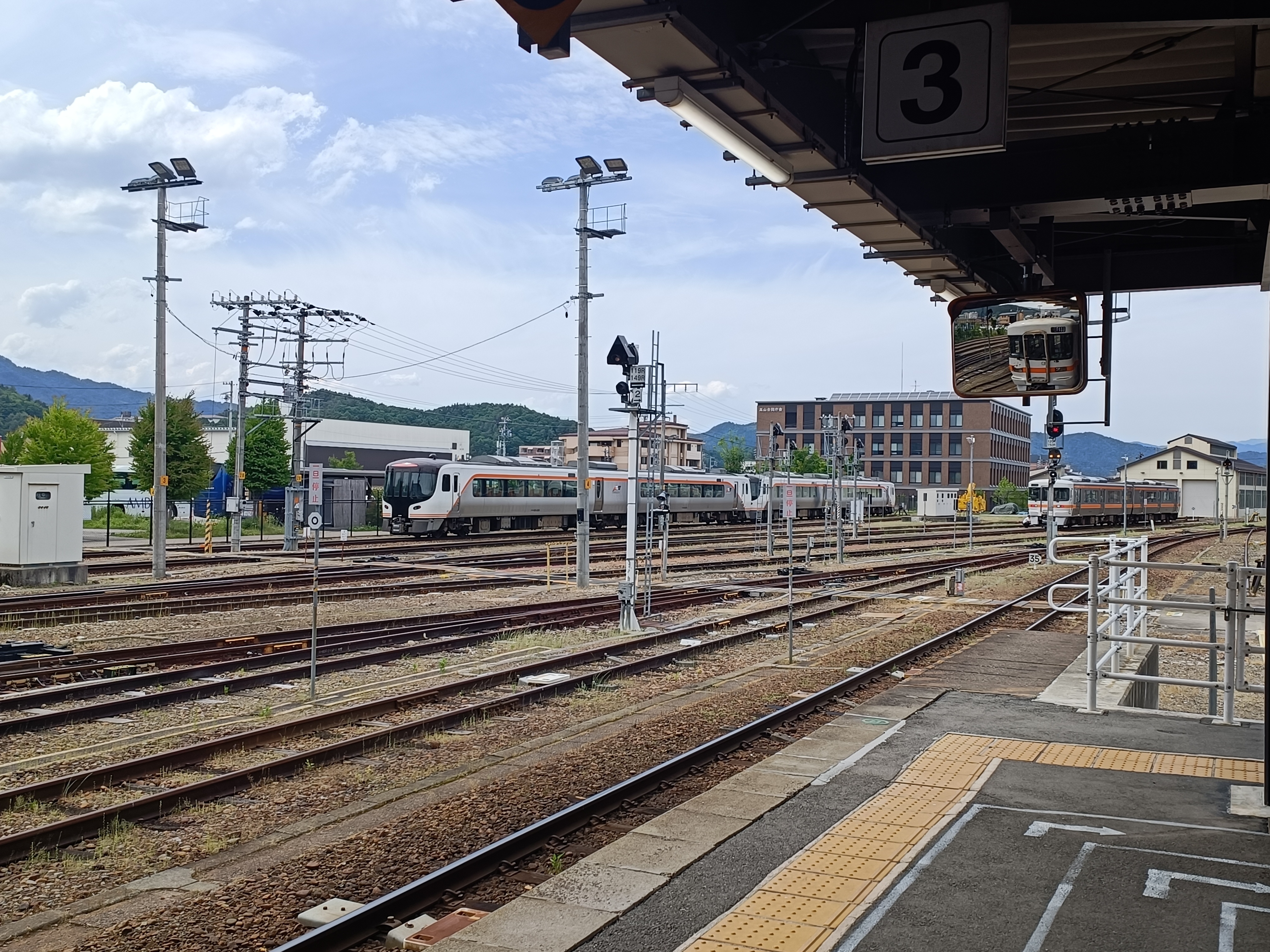
Platform

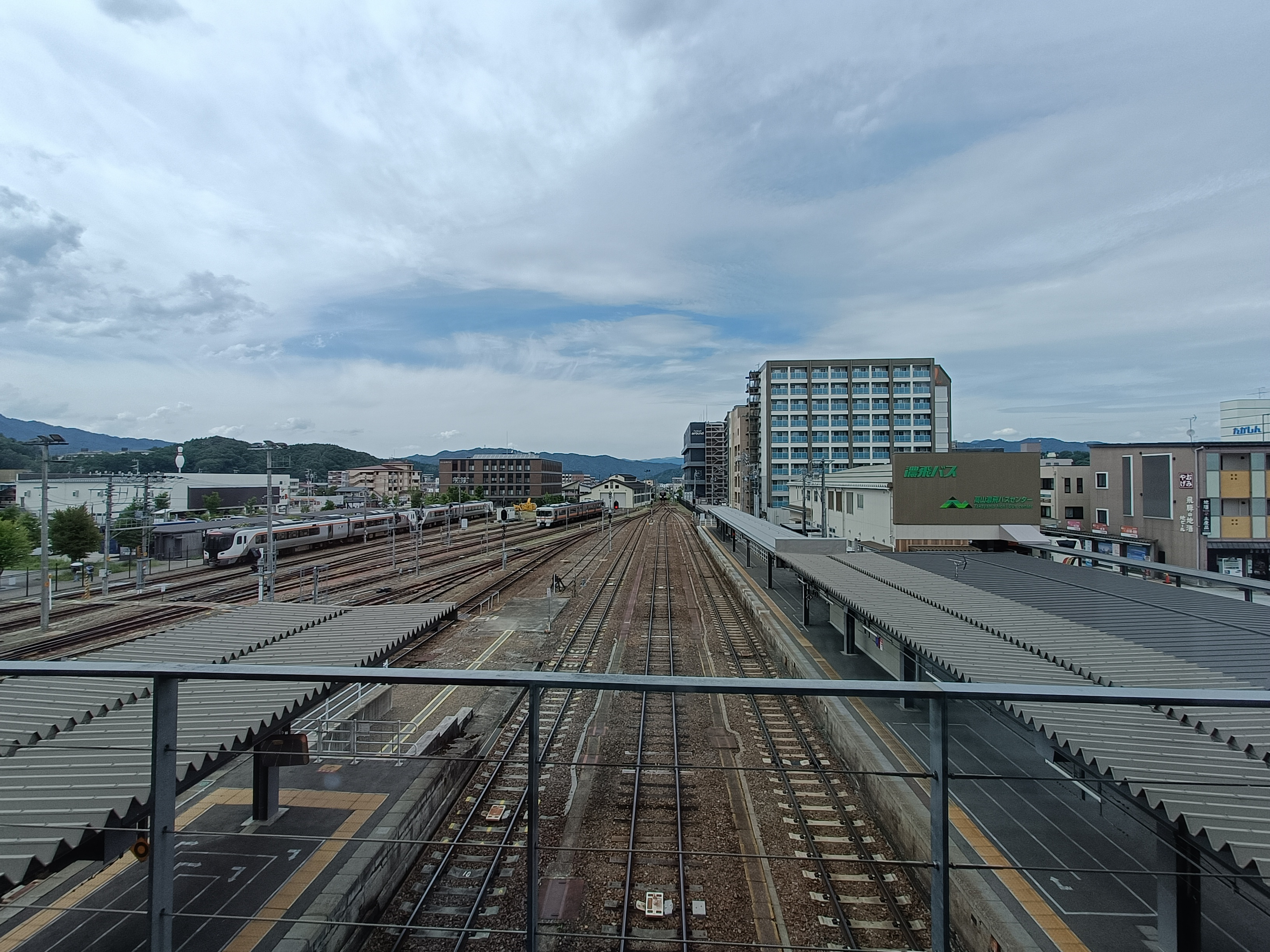
View of the tracks. The Takayama Nohi Bus Center is pictured on the right.

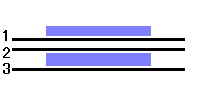
→:for Hida-Ichinomiya ←:for Hozue

Takayama Station has one ground-level side platform and one ground-level island platform connected by a footbridge. The station has a Midori no Madoguchi staffed ticket office. The ticket gates are located on the side platform.

=== Platforms ===
1-3	■ Takayama Main Line	for Gero and Gifu for Toyama

== Adjacent stations ==
«	Service	»
Takayama Main Line
Kuguno	Limited Express Hida	Hida-Furukawa or Terminus

== History ==
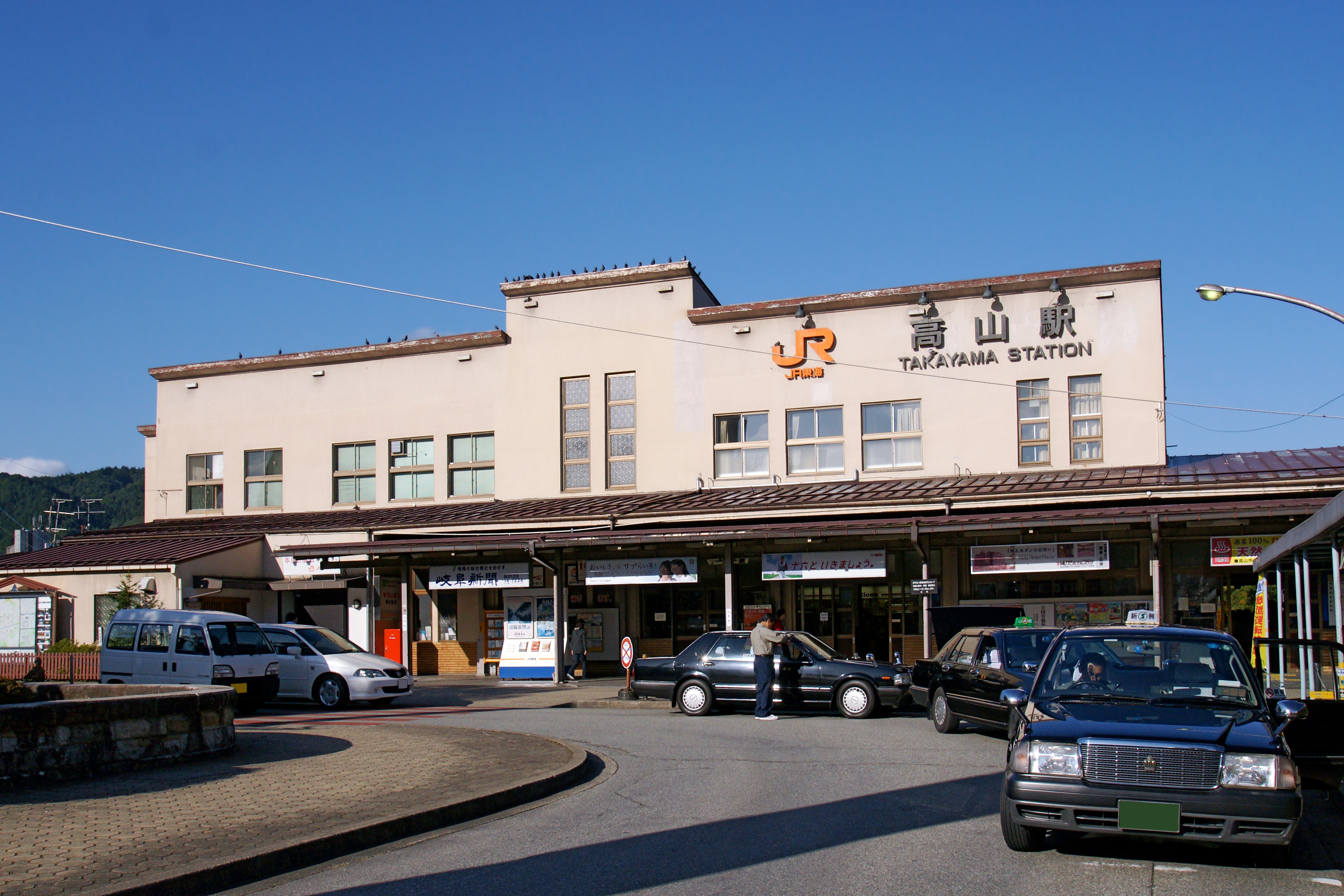
The former station building in September 2009

Takayama Station opened on October 25, 1934. The station was absorbed into the JR Central network upon the privatization of Japanese National Railways (JNR) on April 1, 1987.

The station was redesigned and rebuilt in 2007 by architect Hiroshi Naito.

== Passenger statistics ==
In fiscal 2015, the station was used by an average of 1,539 passengers daily (boarding passengers only).

== Surrounding area ==
- Takayama City Hall

== Takayama Nohi Bus Center ==
The Takayama Nohi Bus Center is located next to this station.

=== Local buses ===
- For Shirakawa-gō
- For Hirayu Onsen, Shinhotaka
- Sarubobo Bus; For Hida no Sato, Matsuri no Mori
- Machinami Bus; For Sakurayama Hachimagu Shrine, Betsuin Temple, Sanmachi-Dori (Loop)

=== Long-distance buses ===
- Chūō Kōsoku Bus; For Shinjuku Station
- Hida Takayama; For Nagoya Station
- For Meitetsu Gifu Station
- For Shirakawa-gō, Toyama Station
- For Shirakawa-gō, Kanazawa Station
- For Matsumoto Bus Terminal (Matsumoto Station)
- For Kyoto Station, Osaka Station, and Osaka Namba Station (Osaka City Air Terminal

== See also ==
- List of railway stations in Japan
