= Gifu City Science Museum =

Coordinates: 35.403905°N 136.730861°E

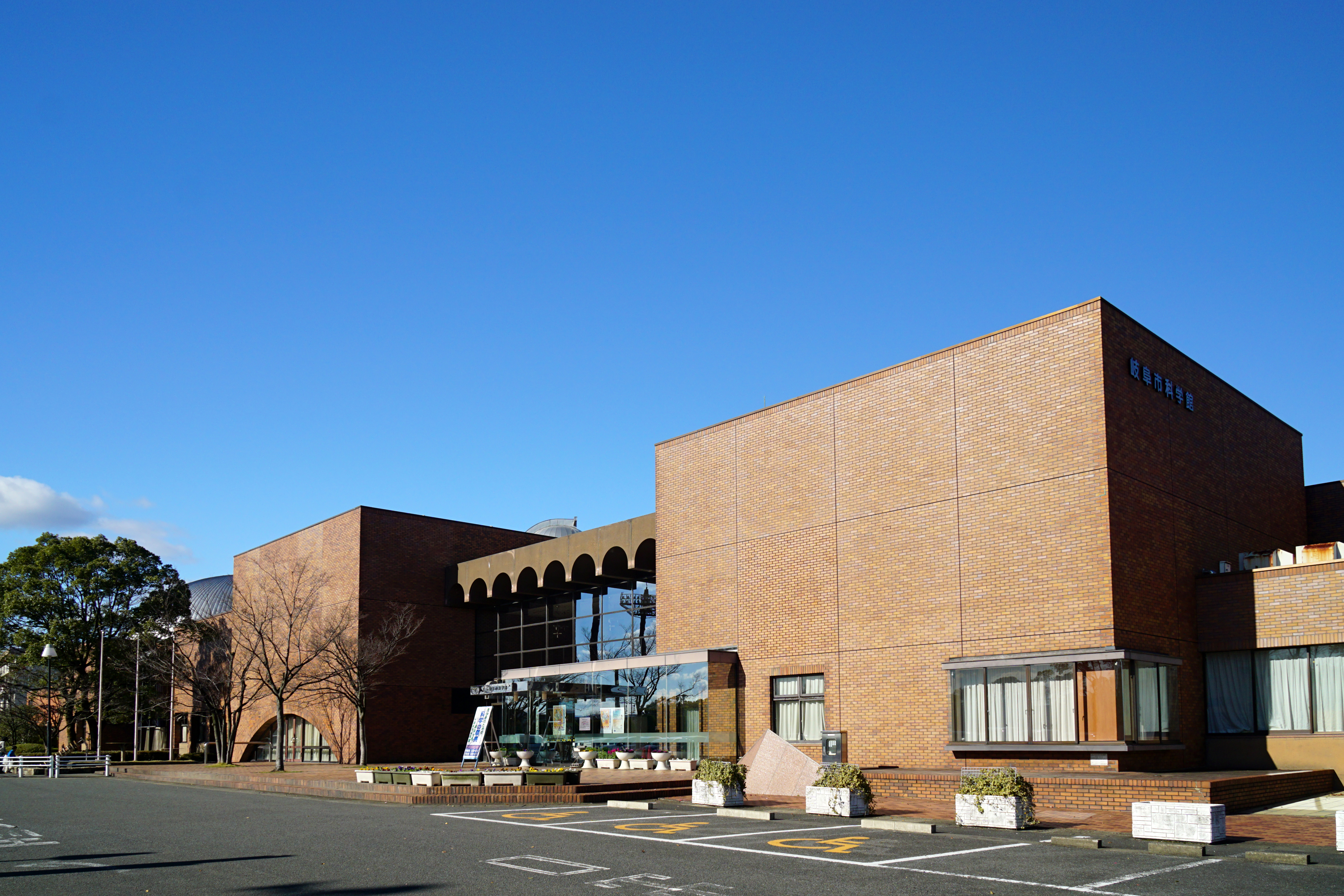
- Established: 1980
- Location: Gifu, Gifu Prefecture; Japan
- Type: Science museum
- Visitors: 102,908 (2007)
- Public transit access: Nishi-Gifu Station (JR Central); Gifu Bus
- Website: Science Museum homepage

The Gifu City Science Museum (岐阜市科学館, Gifu-shi Kagakukan) is a city-supported museum in Gifu, Gifu Prefecture, Japan. It was built in 1955 and was moved to its present location and renamed the Gifu City Children's Science Center in 1980. When the planetarium was added in 1988, the name was again changed to the Gifu City Science Museum. There are many hands-on exhibits in the museum.

== Exhibits ==
- Exhibition Room 1: Local Nature
- Exhibition Room 2: Science & Technology 1
- Exhibition Room 3: Sciency & Technology 2
- Exhibition Room 4: Outerspace
- Exhibition Room 5: Meteorology
- Planetarium: (rotating exhibitions)
- Gifu Butterfly Land: Children's area
- Rooftop Observatory: Large Telescope

== Planetarium ==
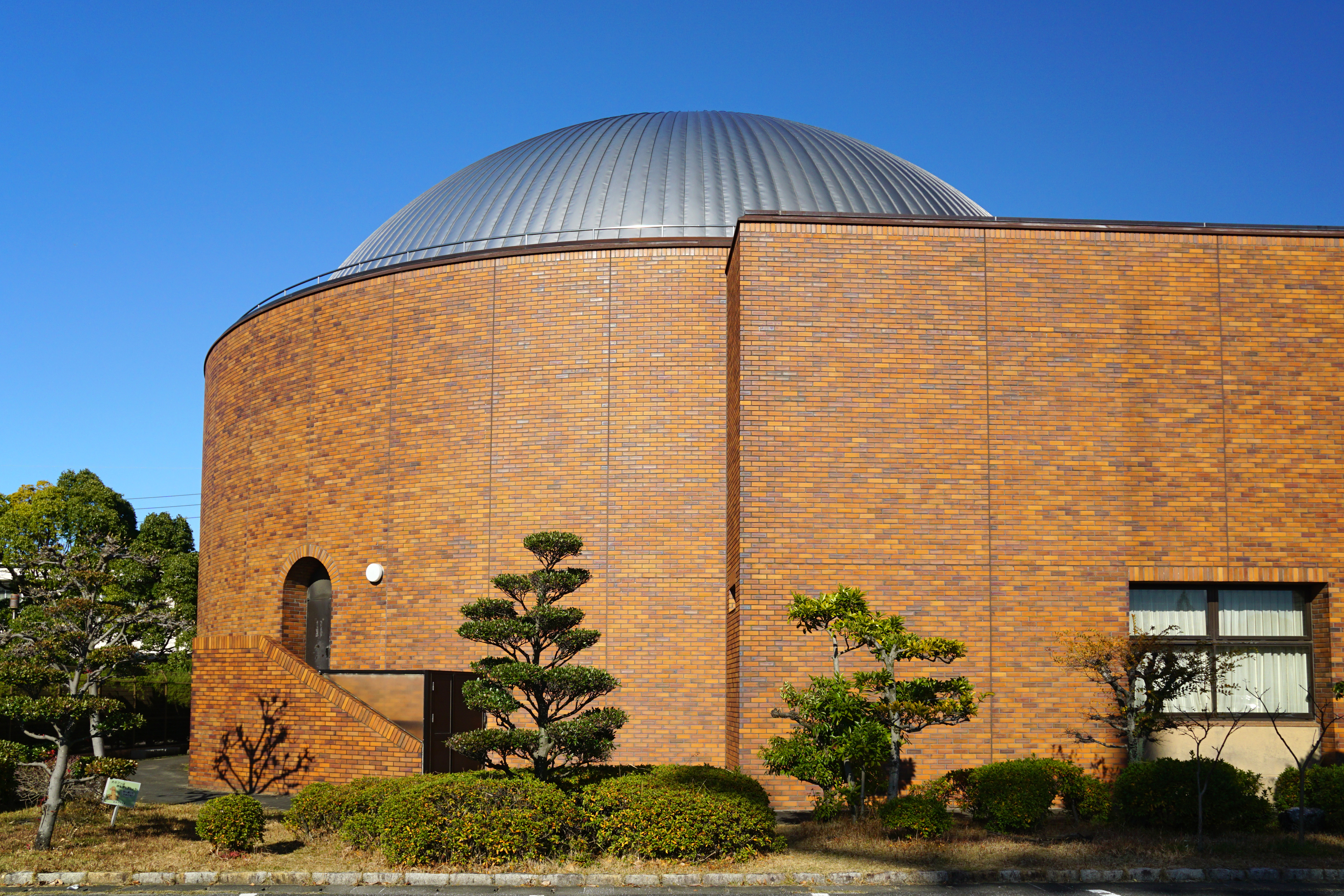
Planetarium

The planetarium at the Gifu City Science Museum has a dome with a diameter of approximately 20 meters and seating for 221. Its shows last between 50 minutes and one hour. The first half of the show is used to explain the night sky for that day, with the second half of the show being dedicated to a seasonally or thematically relevant topic. Additionally, subtitles are provided on the third Sunday of each month for the 10:30am and 4:00pm show.

| Planetarium Schedule | 10:30am | 1:00pm | 2:30pm | 4:00pm |
|---|---|---|---|---|
| Weekdays | no show | General Show | General Show | General Show |
| Weekends/Holidays | Children's Show | General Show | General Show | Arion Time |

- Arion Time

Arion Time is an original program for the Science Museum. Its purpose is to help visitors enjoy the night sky while listening to relaxing music. Along with the music and images chosen to match the themes of the show, explanations are provided both orally and through subtitles. Below is a list of songs using in Arion Time.
- Book of Days by Enya
- Love (Destiny) by Ayumi Hamasaki
- Kiseki by Kumi Koda
- Unmei no Hito by EXILE
- SWING by the Tokyo Ska Paradise Orchestra

== Rooftop observatory ==
A large telescope is located on the roof of the Science Museum and it is used to teach local citizens about both the afternoon and nighttime sky.

=== Nighttime sky viewing ===
This event is provided as a one-class course for Nagaragawa College. Those who complete the course will receive a Manabi-kun Seal (まなびー君シール). It is conducted approximately once per month between April and September, with the objects being viewed changing monthly. The viewing begins at 7:00pm and last for two hours.

The cost is 100yen for those up to Junior High School, and 300yen for adults.

=== Afternoon sky viewing ===
This viewing is focused on parts of the sky that are visible during the day, including sun spots, the moon, and Venus. It is approximately a 20-minute show that occurs on weekends and holidays.

== Facilities information ==
- Hours of Operation

9:30am to 5:30pm (entry until 5:00pm)

- Holidays

Monday (Tuesday if Monday is a national holiday)
Day after national holidays (if Sunday is a national holiday, the museum will be closed on Tuesday)
Dec. 29 to Jan. 3

- Entrance fee (price in parentheses indicates group price)

| Age | Regular Exhibit | Planetarium |
|---|---|---|
| 3 y.o. to Junior High | 100yen (60yen) | 200yen (120yen) |
| High School and above | 300yen (240yen) | 600yen (480yen) |

- Groups discounts are given for parties of 20 or more.
- Special exhibit fees are separate.

== Access ==
- Bus

From JR Gifu Station, board a bus on Gifu Bus' Kano Danchi Line, heading towards Ichihashi. Get off at "Kagakukan." The ride takes approximately 10 minutes.

- Train

From JR Nishi-Gifu Station on the Tōkaidō Line, the museum is a 15 minute walk. Also, visitors can board the free Fureai Bus from the southside of JR Nishi Gifu Station, which will take them to the museum in approximately 8 minutes.
