= Owari-Ichinomiya Station =

Railway station in Ichinomiya, Aichi Prefecture, Japan

CA72 Owari-Ichinomiya Station 尾張一宮駅
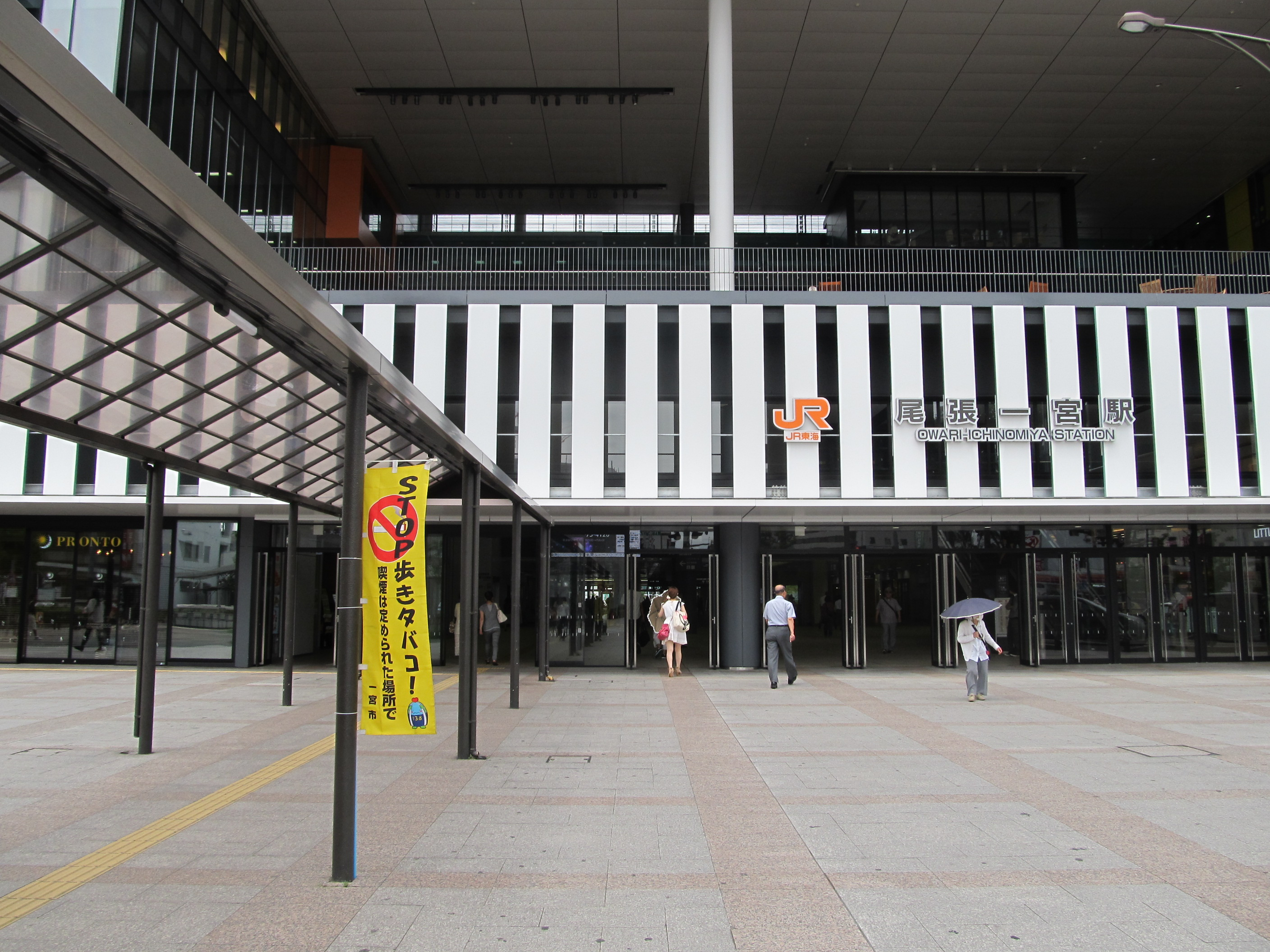
- Owari-Ichinomiya Station in July 2013

General information
- Location: 3-1-1 Sakae, Ichinomiya-shi, Aichi-ken 491-0858; Japan
- Coordinates: 35.30208°N 136.79747°E
- Operator: JR Central
- Line: Tokaido Main Line
- Distance: 383.1 kilometers from Tokyo
- Platforms: 2 island platforms

Other information
- Status: Staffed
- Station code: CA72

History
- Opened: 1 May 1886
- Former names: Ichinomiya (to 1916)

Passengers
- 2023–2024: 49,066 daily

Services
Preceding station	JR Central	Following station
Gifu towards Maibara	Tōkaidō Main Line Hida Shirasagi	Nagoya towards Atami
Gifu towards Maibara	Tōkaidō Main Line Special Rapid New Rapid Rapid Semi Rapid	Nagoya towards Atami
Kisogawa towards Maibara	Tōkaidō Main Line Local	Inazawa towards Atami
Location
- Location within Aichi Prefecture Location within Japan

Track Layout

Owari-Ichinomiya Station (尾張一宮駅, Owari-Ichinomiya-eki) is a railway station in the city of Ichinomiya, Aichi Prefecture, Japan, operated by Central Japan Railway Company (JR Tōkai). The station is physically joined to Meitetsu-Ichinomiya Station.

Owari-Ichinomiya Station is served by the Tōkaidō Main Line, and is located 383.1 kilometers (238.0 mi) west from the starting point of the line at Tokyo Station.

== Station layout ==
The station has two elevated island platforms with passing loops with the station building underneath. The station building has automated ticket machines, TOICA automated turnstiles and is staffed.

=== Platforms ===
1, 2	■ Tokaido Main Line	for Nagoya and Okazaki
3, 4	■ Tokaido Main Line	for Gifu and Ōgaki

== History ==
The station opened on 1 May 1886 as Ichinomiya Station (一宮駅, Ichinomiya-eki). It was renamed to Owari-Ichinomiya Station (尾張一ノ宮駅) on January 1, 1916, with the spelling changed to its present form on November 15, 1952. Freight operations were discontinued in 1979. With the dissolution and privatization of the JNR on April 1, 1987, the station came under the control of the Central Japan Railway Company. A new station building was completed in 2012.

Station numbering was introduced to the section of the Tōkaidō Line operated JR Central in March 2018; Owari-Ichinomiya Station was assigned station number CA72.

== Passenger statistics ==
In fiscal 2016, the station was used by an average of 26,809 passengers daily (boarding passengers only).

== Surrounding area ==
- Meitetsu-Ichinomiya Station (Meitetsu Nagoya Main Line)
- Shubun University
- Masumida Shrine
- Japan National Route 155

== See also ==
- List of railway stations in Japan
