= Chisato Station =

Chisato Station (千里駅) is the name of two train stations in Japan:

- Chisato Station (Mie)
- Chisato Station (Toyama)
