= Owari Kokubun-ji =

Buddhist temple in Inazawa, Japan

- 尾張国分寺
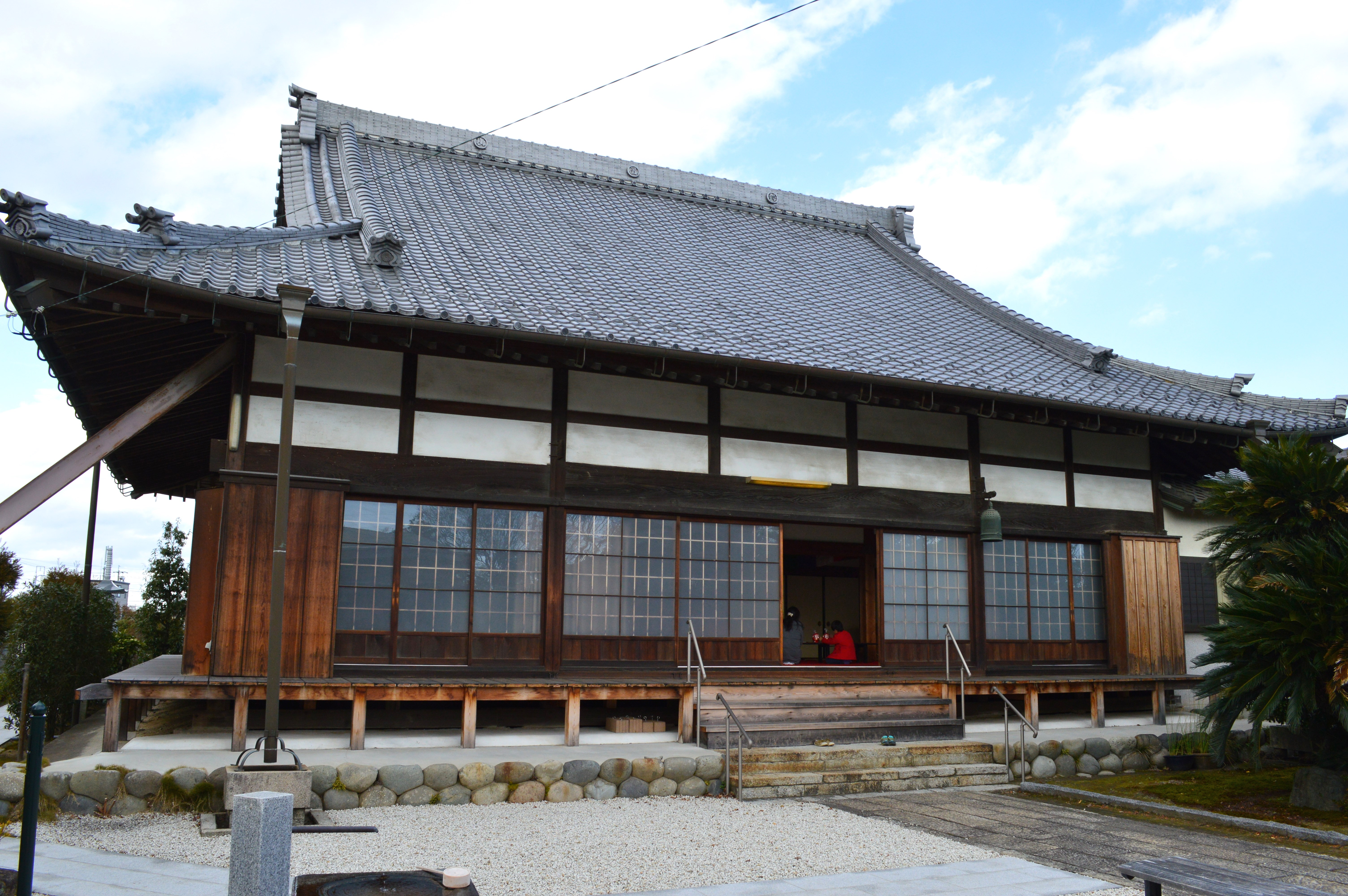
- Owari Kokubun-ji Hondo

- Location within Aichi Prefecture Location within Japan

Religion
- Affiliation: Buddhist
- Deity: Yakushi Nyōrai
- Rite: Rinzai school
- Status: functional

Location
- Location: Shiroato-2490 Yawasechō, Inazawa-shi, Aichi-ken 492-8342
- Country: Japan
- Interactive map of Owari Kokubun-ji
- Coordinates: 35°14′00″N 136°46′24″E

Architecture
- Founder: Emperor Shōmu
- Completed: 741

Website
- Official website
- National Important Cultural Property National Historic Site of Japan

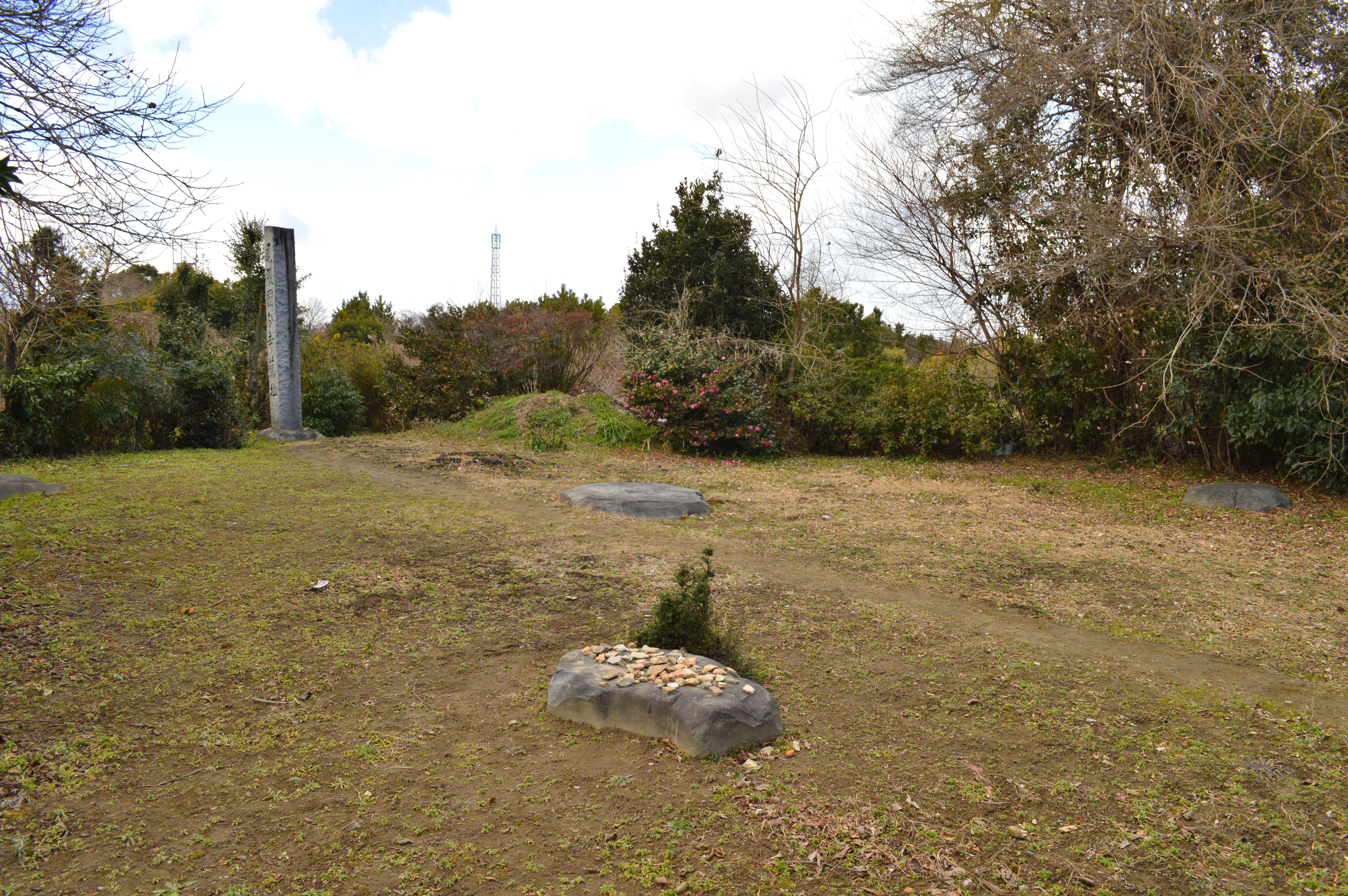
ruins of ancient Owari Kokubun-ji

The Owari Kokubun-ji (尾張国分寺) is a Buddhist temple located in the Yawase neighborhood of the city of Inazawa, Aichi, Japan. The temple belongs to the Myōshin-ji branch of the Rinzai school of Japanese Zen. Its main image is a statue of Yakushi Nyōrai. It is the modern successor of one of the provincial temples established by Emperor Shōmu during the Nara period (710 – 794) for the purpose of promoting Buddhism as the national religion of Japan and standardising control of imperial rule over the provinces. The foundation stones of the original temple was designated as a National Historic Site by the Japanese government in 2012.

== Owari Kokubun-ji ruins ==
The Shoku Nihongi records that in 741, as the country recovered from a major smallpox epidemic, Emperor Shōmu ordered that a monastery and nunnery be established in every province, the kokubunji (国分寺).

The Owari Kokubun-ji was founded in 741 as the provincial temple of Owari Province, and is located approximately 900 meters south of its modern incarnation. The site is located on the a natural levee on the left bank of the Miyake River, and the ruins of the provincial capital of the province are four kilometers to the north-northeast. The template compound measures approximately 300 meters north-to-south by 200 meters east-to-west, although the exact dimensions have not been completely surveyed. Within this compound, the layout of the buildings was in accordance with the standardized "Shichidō garan" formation in a north–south line, similar to Tōdai-ji in Nara, the template upon which the kokubunji temples were based.

The foundation stones of the Kondō indicate that it was a 25.6 x 21.6 meter structure erected on a tiled platform. Only two cornerstones of the foundations of the Lecture Hall have been found, but it also built on a tiled platform. The pagoda had a foundation 14.7 meters square. It is estimated to have had three, or perhaps five stories, due to the weak foundation. No remains of the South Gate, Middle Gate, and only a small portion of the cloisters have yet been discovered, as most of the site is on private land, and a complete archaeological excavation has not been conducted.

The Owari Kokubun-ji is mentioned several times in the 8th century Shoku Nihongi and per an entry in the Nihon Kiryaku dated August 26, 884 AD, the temple burned down, and its functions were transferred to Ganko-ji in Aichi County (possibly the site of Owari Gango-ji in Naka-ku, Nagoya. Excavations have not confirmed that the temple continued to exist after the burnt down, and there is no documentary record of it being rebuilt; however, the monk Kūya, who traveled around Japan in the Engi and Enchō eras (901-931) spreading the teachings of Pure Land Buddhism, shaved his head and became a monk at the Owari Kokubun-ji when he was about 20 years old. The location of the temple was preserved as a local place name into the Edo period, and was commemorated by a stone monument in 1915. From 1961 to 2013, a total of 17 excavations were conducted.

Shingon Risshu sect records make mention of an Owari Kokubun-ji in the year 920 and such a temple is listed as a subsidiary of Saidai-ji in Nara in 1391; however, this appears to be reference to an unrelated temple.

== Current Owari Kokubun-ji ==
The present-day Owari Kokubun-ji was formerly called Enkō-ji (円興寺) and was renamed to its present name in 1886. The foundation of Enkō-ji is not certain, but from temple records it is believed to be either 1328 or 1375 by a disciple of Nanpo Shōmyō of Kenchō-ji. and was relocated to its present location in the early 17th century. At the time, a Shaka-dō chapel containing a Yakushi Nyorai statue claimed to be from the original Owari Kokubun-ji was merged with Enko-ji, and the temple renamed itself due to the greater prestige of the ancient name.

The temple is approximately 5.2 kilometers west of Inazawa Station on the JR Tokai Tōkaidō Main Line.

== Cultural Properties ==
=== National Important Cultural Properties ===
- Wooden statue of standing Shaka Nyorai (木造釈迦如来坐像), Kamakura period
- Wooden statue of standing Shaka Nyorai (木造釈迦如来坐像), Muromachi period
- Wooden statues of seated male and female kami of Atsuta Myojin (木造伝熱田大宮司夫妻坐像), Nanboku-cho period; The male statue is 60.7 cm tall and the female statue is 60.9 cm tall. Both are made of hinoki cypress wood inlaid with marquetry.
- Wooden portrait statue of monk Dengakuzan (木造伝覚山和尚坐像), Nanboku-cho period;

== Owari Kokubun-niji ==
The remains of the ancient Kokubun-niji provincial nunnery associated with the Owaki Kokubun-ji are unknown. Its location is estimated to be near Hokke-ji Temple (35°14′42.16″N 136°45′57.47″E) in Hokkeji-cho, Inazawa, about 1.5 kilometers northwest of the Owari Kokubun-ji temple ruins. However, no excavation has been conducted to date, so the details are unclear. Four garden stones thought to be cornerstones from the nunnery have been found in a nearby private home. Historical records include an official account dated 988, which states that Owari no Kami Fujiwara no Motomichi refused to pay repair fees for the nunnery, and a petition from Oe no Masafusa in 1009, which states that the nunnery should be renovated between 1001 and 1004. Thus, it is confirmed that the temple survived until the 11th century, longer than the Owari Kokubun-ji, but its subsequent history is unknown. According to temple legend, the modern Hokke-ji was founded in the Eikyō era (1504-1521) on the former site of the nunnery, but was destroyed by fire during the Oda clan's internecine wars and was moved to its current location. This Hokke-ji is home to a wooden seated statue of Yakushi Nyorai (a National Important Cultural Property) made in the late Heian period.

== See also ==
- List of Historic Sites of Japan (Aichi)
- provincial temple
