= CA75 =

CA75 or CA-75 may refer to:

- USS Helena (CA-75), a World War II heavy cruiser
- California State Route 75, a highway in the US state of California
- Nishi-Gifu Station, a railway station in Gifu, Gifu Prefecture, Japan (station code CA75)
