= Higashi-Yatsuo Station =

Railway station in Toyama, Toyama Prefecture, Japan

Higashi-Yatsuo Station 東八尾駅
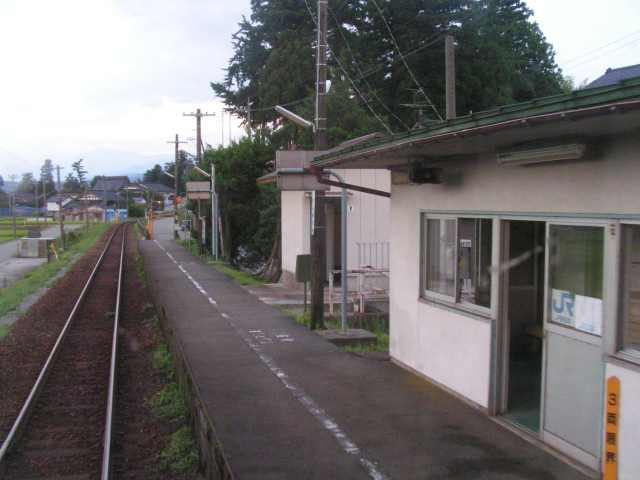
- Higashi-Yatsuo Station in August 2006

General information
- Location: Yatsuo-Jono, Toyama-shi, Toyama-ken 939-2314; Japan
- Coordinates: 36.5899°N 137.1752°E
- Operator: JR West
- Line: ■ Takayama Main Line
- Distance: 205.0 km from Gifu
- Platforms: 1 side platform
- Tracks: 1

Construction
- Structure type: At grade

Other information
- Status: Unstaffed
- Website: Official website

History
- Opened: 1 June 1956

Passengers
- FY2015: 46 daily
Location
- Location within Japan

Higashi-Yatsuo Station (東八尾駅, Higashi-Yatsuo-eki) is a railway station on the Takayama Main Line in city of Toyama, Japan, operated by West Japan Railway Company (JR West).

== Lines ==
Higashi-Yatsuo Station is a station on the Takayama Main Line, and is located 205.0 kilometers from the end of the line at Gifu and 15.8 kilometers from the dividing point on the line between JR West and JR East at Inotani.

== Layout ==
The station has one side platform serving a single bidirectional track. The station is unattended.

== Adjacent stations ==
«	Service	»
Takayama Main Line
Limited Express "Hida": Does not stop at this station
Sasazu	Local	Etchū-Yatsuo

== History ==
The station opened on 1 June 1956. With the privatization of Japanese National Railways (JNR) on 1 April 1987, the station came under the control of JR West.

== Passenger statistics ==
In fiscal 2015, the station was used by an average of 46 passengers daily (boarding passengers only).

== Surrounding area ==
The station is located in a rural area surrounded by fields

== See also ==
- List of railway stations in Japan
