= Sasazu Station =

Railway station in Toyama, Toyama Prefecture, Japan

Sasazu Station 笹津駅
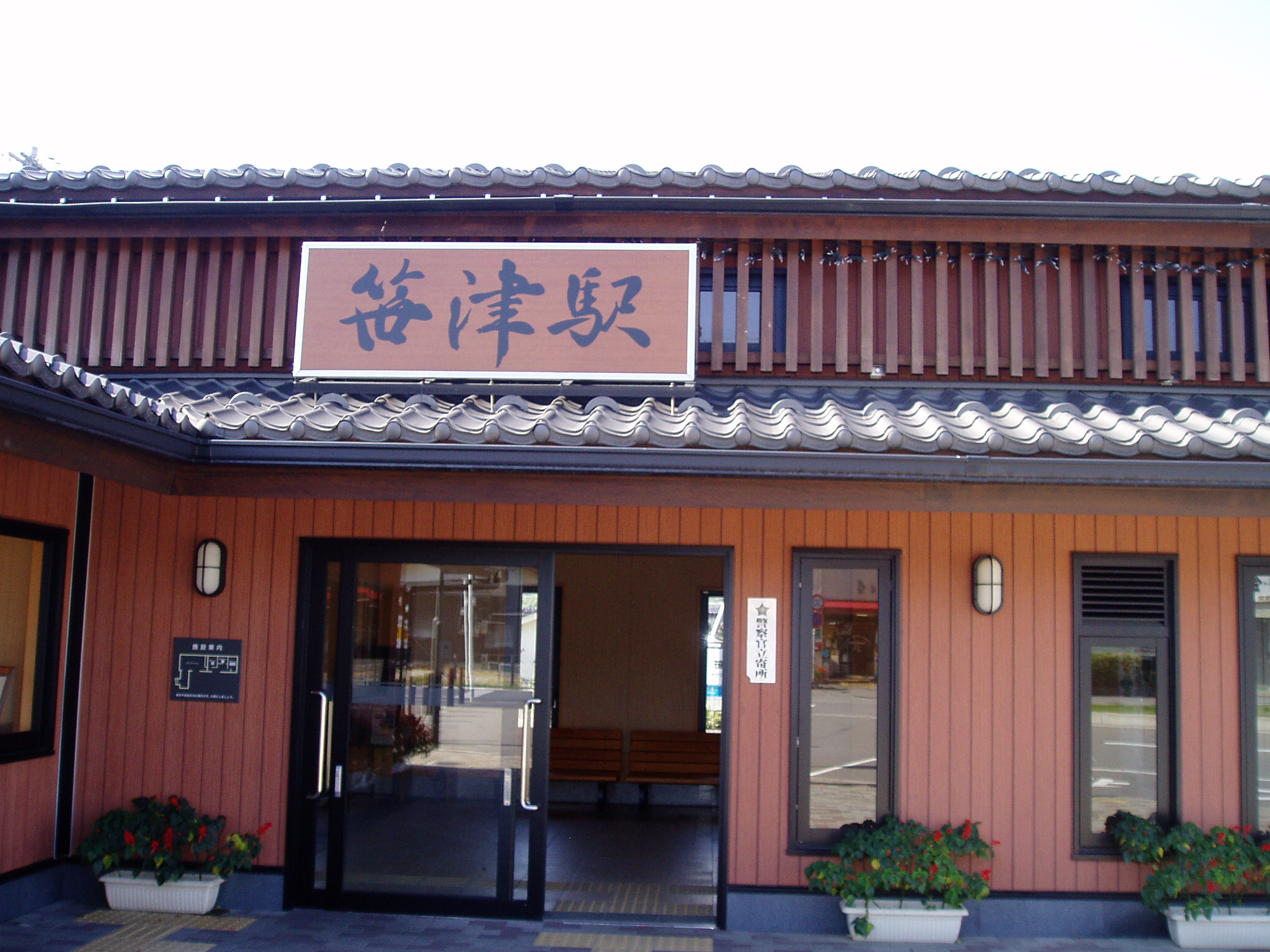
- Sasazu Station in October 2007

General information
- Location: 860 Sasazu, Toyama-shi, Toyama-ken 939-2223; Japan
- Coordinates: 36°33′43″N 137°12′41″E
- Operator: JR West
- Line: ■ Takayama Main Line
- Distance: 200.5 km from Gifu
- Platforms: 1 island platform
- Tracks: 2

Construction
- Structure type: At grade

Other information
- Status: Unstaffed
- Website: Official website

History
- Opened: 27 November 1930

Passengers
- FY2015: 136 daily
Location
- Location within Japan

Sasazu Station (笹津駅, Sasazu-eki) is a railway station on the Takayama Main Line in city of Toyama, Japan, operated by West Japan Railway Company (JR West).

== Lines ==
Sasazu Station is a station on the Takayama Main Line, and is located 200.5 kilometers from the end of the line at Gifu and 11.3 kilometers from the dividing point on the line between JR West and JR East at Inotani.

== Layout ==
The station has one island platform serving two tracks, connected to the station building by a footbridge. The station is unattended.

=== Platforms ===
1	■ Takayama Main Line	for Inotani and Takaoka
2	■ Takayama Main Line	for Toyama

== Adjacent stations ==
«	Service	»
Takayama Main Line
Limited Express "Hida": Does not stop at this station
Nirehara	Local	Higashi-Yatsuo

== History ==
The station opened on 1 October 1929. With the privatization of Japanese National Railways (JNR) on 1 April 1987, the station came under the control of JR West.

== Passenger statistics ==
In fiscal 2015, the station was used by an average of 136 passengers daily (boarding passengers only).

== Surrounding area ==
- Japan National Route 41

== See also ==
- List of railway stations in Japan
