= Etchū-Yatsuo Station =

Railway station in Toyama, Toyama Prefecture, Japan

Etchū-Yatsuo Station 越中八尾駅
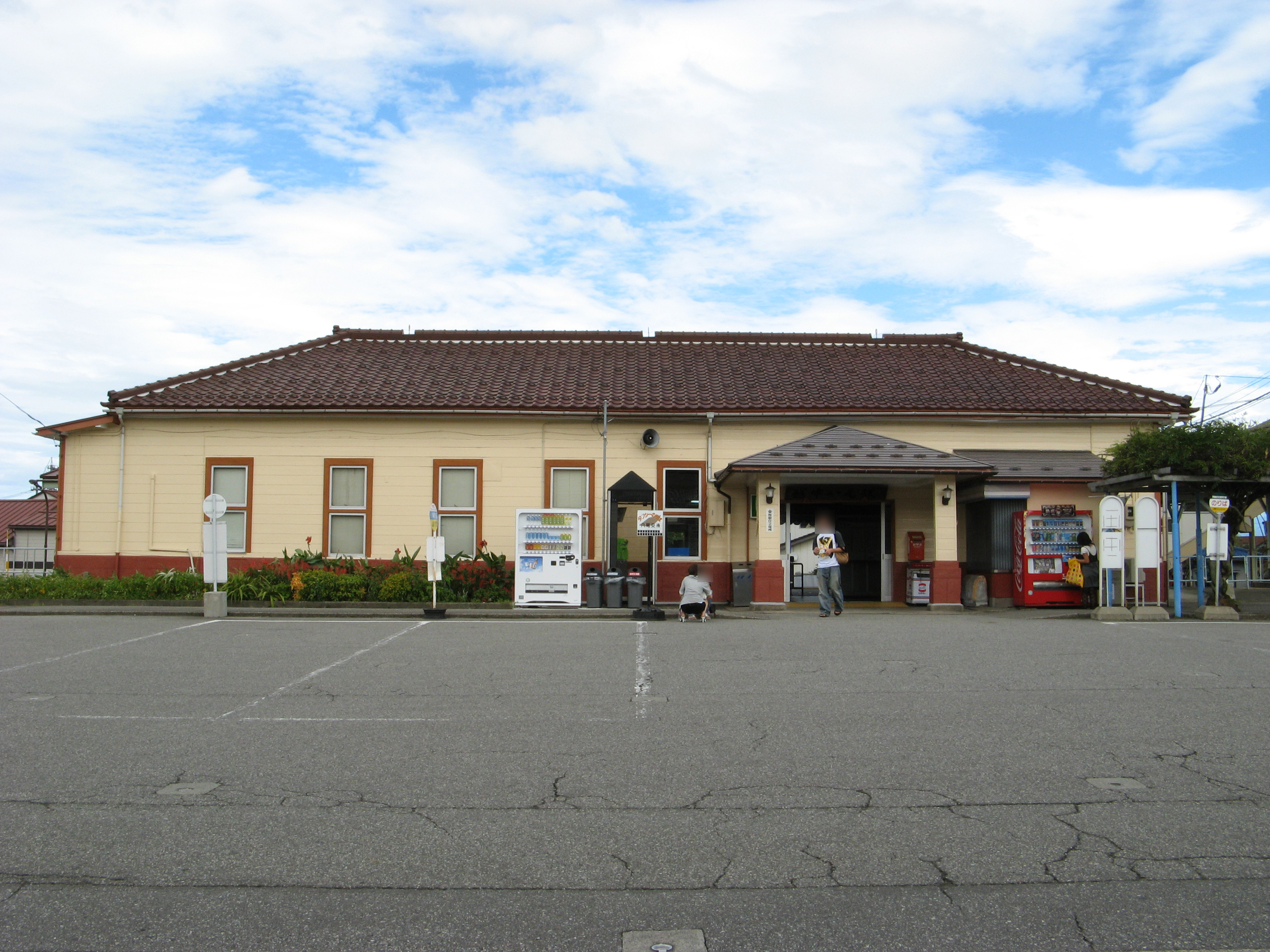
- Etchū-Yatsuo Station in September 2007

General information
- Location: Yatsuomachi Fukujima, Toyama-shi, Toyama-ken 939-2376; Japan
- Coordinates: 36.5918°N 137.1383°E
- Operator: JR West
- Line: ■ Takayama Main Line
- Distance: 208.7 km from Gifu
- Platforms: 2 side platform
- Tracks: 3

Construction
- Structure type: At grade

Other information
- Status: Staffed (Midori no Madoguchi)
- Website: Official website

History
- Opened: 1 September 1927

Passengers
- FY2015: 916 daily
Location
- Location within Japan

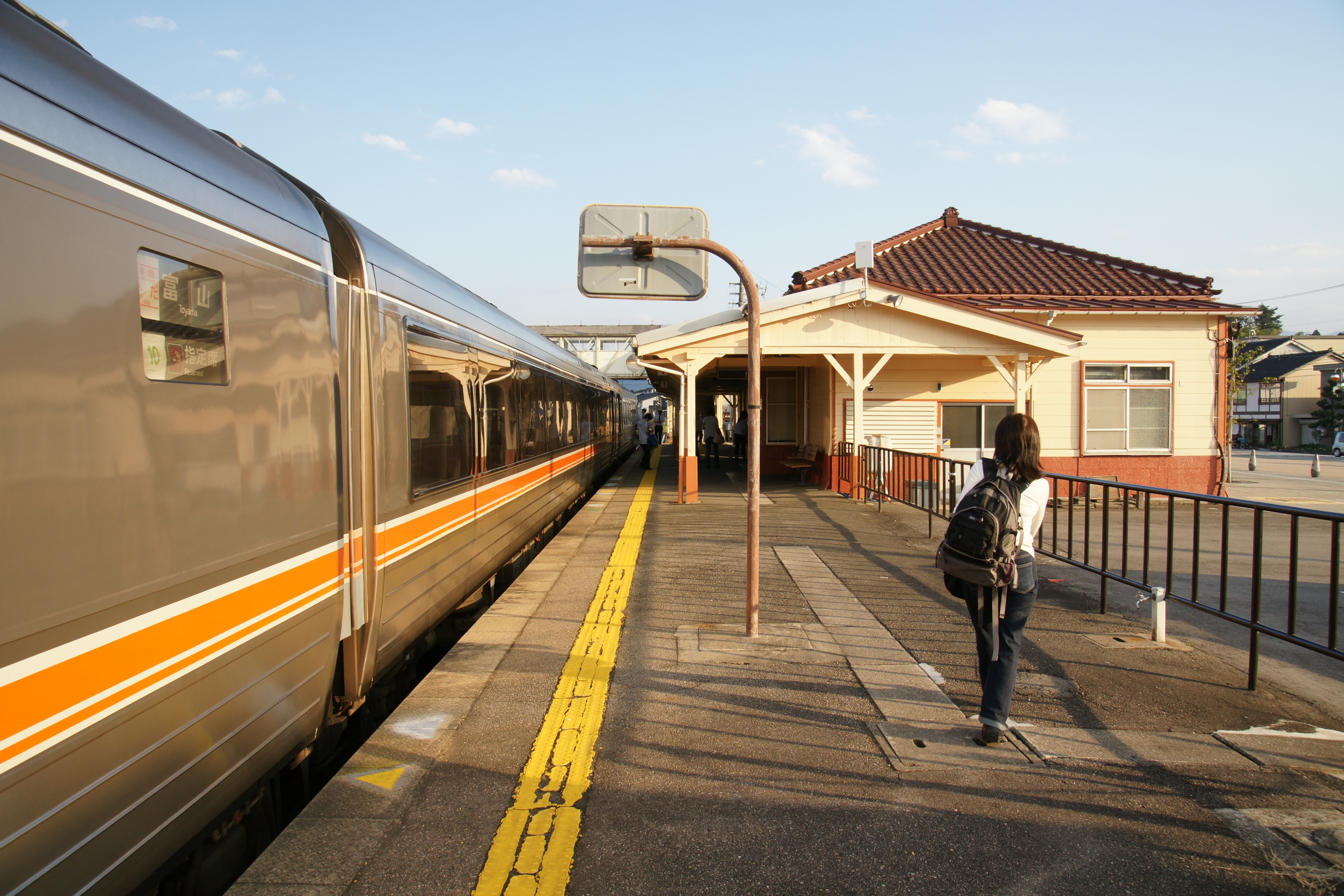
platform

Etchū-Yatsuo Station (越中八尾駅, Etchū-Yatsuo-eki) is a railway station on the Takayama Main Line in city of Toyama, Japan, operated by West Japan Railway Company (JR West).

== Lines ==
Etchū-Yatsuo Station is a station on the Takayama Main Line, and is located 208.7 kilometers (129.7 mi) from the end of the line at Gifu and 19.5 kilometers (12.1 mi) from the dividing point on the line between JR West and JR Central at Inotani.

== Layout ==
The station has one ground-level island platform and one ground-level side platform serving three tracks, connected by a footbridge. The station has a Midori no Madoguchi staffed ticket office.

=== Platforms ===
1	■ Takayama Main Line	for Toyama
2	■ Takayama Main Line	for Inotani and Takaoka
3	■ Takayama Main Line	for starting trains

== Adjacent stations ==
«	Service	»
Takayama Main Line
Higashi-Yatsuo	Local	Chisato
Inotani	Limited Express Hida	Hayahoshi or Toyama

== History ==
The station opened on 1 September 1927. With the privatization of Japanese National Railways (JNR) on 1 April 1987, the station came under the control of JR West.

== Passenger statistics ==
In fiscal 2015, the station was used by an average of 916 passengers daily (boarding passengers only).

== Surrounding area ==
- Etchū-Yatsuo tourist information center

== See also ==
- List of railway stations in Japan
