= Nirehara Station =

Railway station in Toyama, Toyama Prefecture, Japan

Nirehara Station 楡原駅
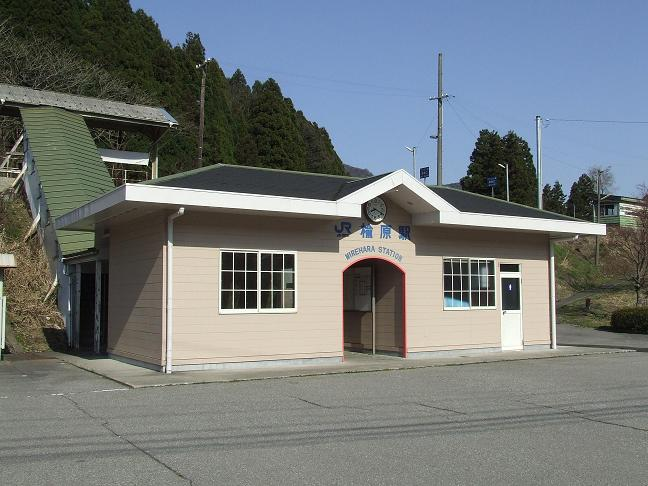
- Nirehara Station in April 2008

General information
- Location: 3610 Nirehara, Toyama-shi, Toyama-ken 939-2184; Japan
- Coordinates: 36.5290°N 137.2289°E
- Operator: JR West
- Line: ■ Takayama Main Line
- Distance: 196.2 km from Gifu
- Platforms: 1 side platform
- Tracks: 1

Construction
- Structure type: At grade

Other information
- Status: Unstaffed
- Website: Official website

History
- Opened: 27 November 1930

Passengers
- FY2015: 35 daily
Location
- Location within Japan

Nirehara Station (楡原駅, Nirehara-eki) is a railway station on the Takayama Main Line in city of Toyama, Japan, operated by West Japan Railway Company (JR West).

== Lines ==
Nirehara Station is a station on the Takayama Main Line, and is located 196.2 kilometers from the end of the line at Gifu and 7.0 kilometers from the dividing point on the line between JR West and JR East at Inotani.

== Layout ==
The station has one side platform serving a single bidirectional track located on an embankment, with the station building at a lower level. The station is unattended.

== Adjacent stations ==
«	Service	»
Takayama Main Line
Limited Express "Hida": Does not stop at this station
Inotani	Local	Sasazu

== History ==
The station opened on 27 November 1930. With the privatization of Japanese National Railways (JNR) on 1 April 1987, the station came under the control of JR West.

== Passenger statistics ==
In fiscal 2015, the station was used by an average of 35 passengers daily (boarding passengers only).

== Surrounding area ==
- former Hosoiri Village Hall
- Japan National Route 41

== See also ==
- List of railway stations in Japan
