= Hayahoshi Station =

Railway station in Toyama, Toyama Prefecture, Japan

Hayahoshi Station 速星駅
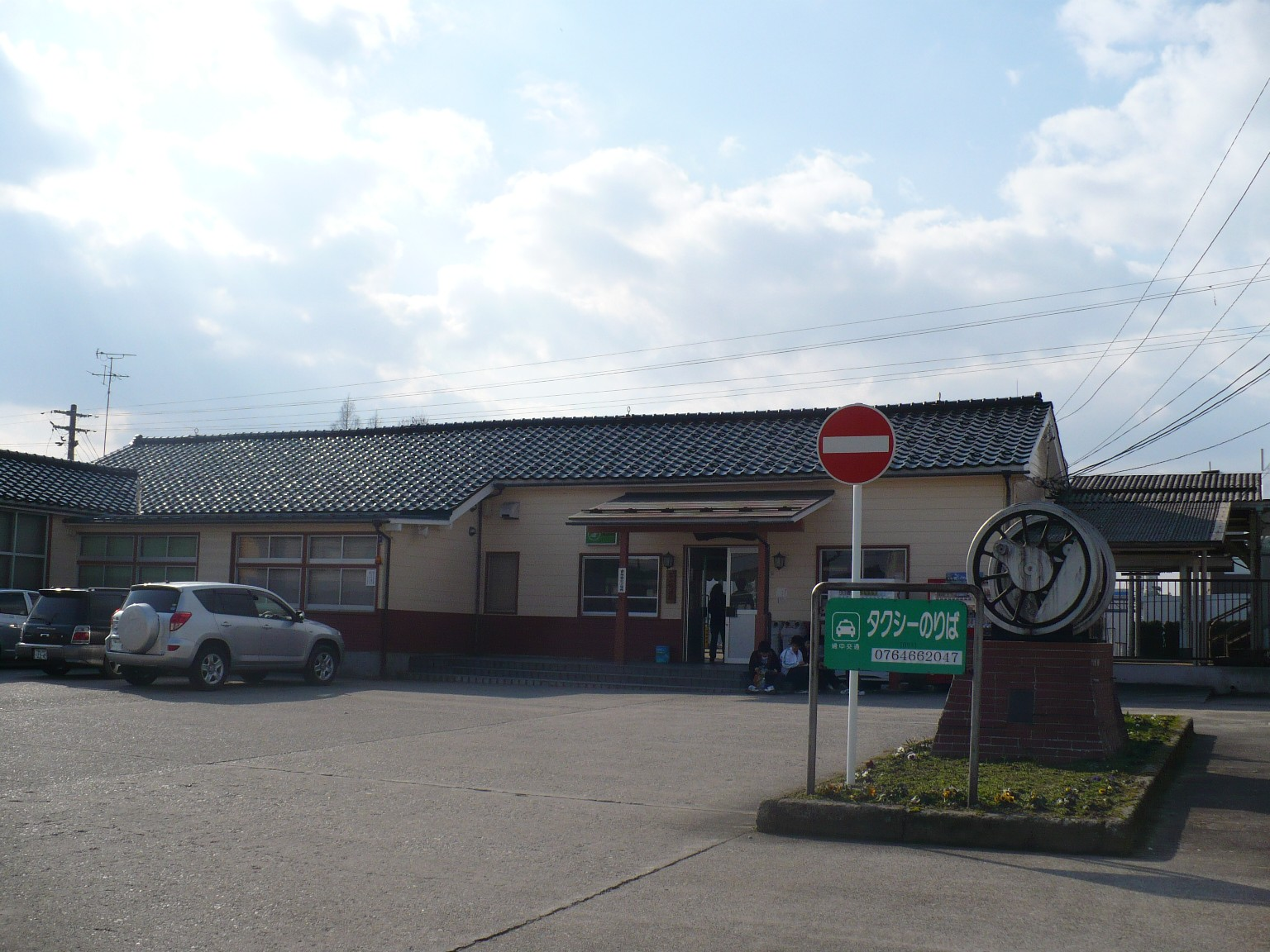
- Hayahoshi Station in March 2008

General information
- Location: Fuchumachi Hayahoshi, Toyama-shi, Toyama-ken 939-2706; Japan
- Coordinates: 36.6646°N 137.1605°E
- Operator: JR West; JR Freight
- Line: ■ Takayama Main Line
- Distance: 217.9 km from Gifu
- Platforms: 1 side + 1 island platform
- Tracks: 3

Construction
- Structure type: At grade

Other information
- Status: Staffed (Midori no Madoguchi)
- Website: Official website

History
- Opened: 1 September 1927

Passengers
- FY2015: 1049 daily
Location
- Location within Japan

Hayahoshi Station (速星駅, Hayahoshi-eki) is a railway station on the Takayama Main Line in city of Toyama, Japan, operated by West Japan Railway Company (JR West). It is also a freight terminal for the Japan Freight Railway Company.

== Lines ==
Hayahoshi Station is a station on the Takayama Main Line, and is located 217.9 kilometers from the end of the line at Gifu and 28.7 kilometers from the dividing point on the line between JR West and JR East at Inotani.

== Layout ==
The station has one ground-level side platform and one ground-level island platform serving three tracks. The station has a Midori no Madoguchi staffed ticket office.

=== Platforms ===
1	■ Takayama Main Line	for Inotani and Takaoka
2	■ Takayama Main Line	for Toyama
3	■ Takayama Main Line	for use by freight trains only

== Adjacent stations ==
«	Service	»
Takayama Main Line
Chisato	Local	Fuchū-Usaka
Etchu-Yatsuo	Limited Express Hida	Toyama

== History ==
The station opened on 1 September 1927. With the privatization of Japanese National Railways (JNR) on 1 April 1987, the station came under the control of JR West.

== Passenger statistics ==
In fiscal 2015, the station was used by an average of 1,049 passengers daily (boarding passengers only).

== Surrounding area ==
- Japan National Route 359
- Former Fuchu Town Hall
- Nissan Chemical Company Ltd

== See also ==
- List of railway stations in Japan
