= Shubun =

Shubun may refer to:

- Shubun University, a private university in Ichinomiya, Aichi
- Tenshō Shūbun (天章 周文), Japanese Zen Buddhist monk and painter
- Qiufen, also known in Japanese as Shūbun (秋分), the 16th solar term of the Chinese lunisolar calendar
