= CA76 =

CA76 or CA-76 may refer to:

- California State Route 76, a state highway in the US state of California
- Hozumi Station, a railway station in Mizuho, Gifu, Japan (station code CA76)
- Caldwell 76, a star cluster
