= CA73 =

CA73 or CA-73 may refer to:

- California State Route 73, a state route in the US state of California
- Kisogawa Station, a railway station in Ichinomiya, Aichi, Japan (station code CA73)
- ARM Cortex-A73, abbreviated as CA-73
