= Nagamori Station =

Railway station in Gifu, Gifu Prefecture, Japan

CG01 Nagamori Station 長森駅
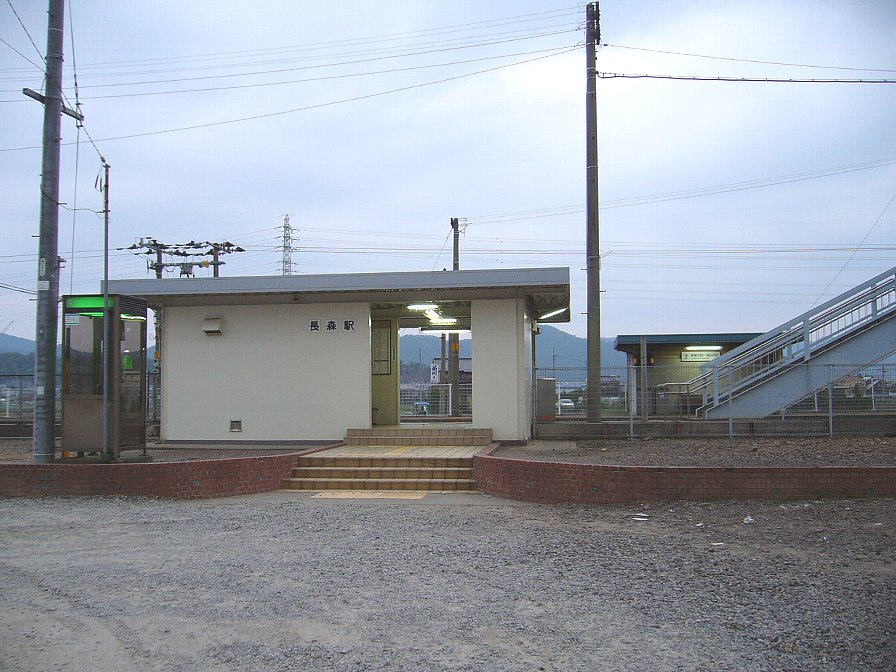
- Nagamori Station in June 2006

General information
- Location: 2-14-12 Kuramae, Gifu-shi, Gifu-ken 500-8233; Japan
- Coordinates: 35.4018°N 136.8032°E
- Operator: JR Central
- Line: Takayama Main Line
- Distance: 4.2 km from Gifu
- Platforms: 2 side platforms
- Tracks: 2

Other information
- Status: Unstaffed

History
- Opened: November 1, 1920; 105 years ago

Passengers
- FY2015: 643 daily
Location
- Location within Gifu Prefecture Location within Japan

Nagamori Station (長森駅, Nagamori-eki) is a railway station on the Takayama Main Line in the city of Gifu, Gifu Prefecture, Japan, operated by Central Japan Railway Company (JR Central). Along with Gifu Station and Nishi-Gifu Station, it is one of the three JR Central stations in the city of Gifu.

== Lines ==
Nagamori Station is served by the JR Central Takayama Main Line, and is located 4.2 kilometers from the official starting point of the line at Gifu.

== Station layout ==
Nagamori Station has two opposed ground-level side platforms connected by a footbridge. The station is unattended.

=== Platforms ===
1	■ Takayama Main Line	for Gifu and Nagoya
2	■ Takayama Main Line	for Mino-Ōta and Takayama

== Adjacent stations ==
«	Service	»
Takayama Main Line
Limited Express "Hida": Does not stop at this station
Gifu	Local	Naka

== History ==
Nagamori Station opened on November 1, 1920. The station was absorbed into the JR Central network upon the privatization of Japanese National Railways (JNR) on April 1, 1987.

== Passenger statistics ==
In fiscal 2015, the station was used by an average of 643 passengers daily (boarding passengers only).

== Surrounding area ==
- Gifu General Medical Centre
- Tejikara Station (Meitetsu Kakamigahara Line)

== See also ==
- List of railway stations in Japan
