= Chisato Station (Toyama) =

Railway station in Toyama, Toyama Prefecture, Japan

Chisato Station 千里駅
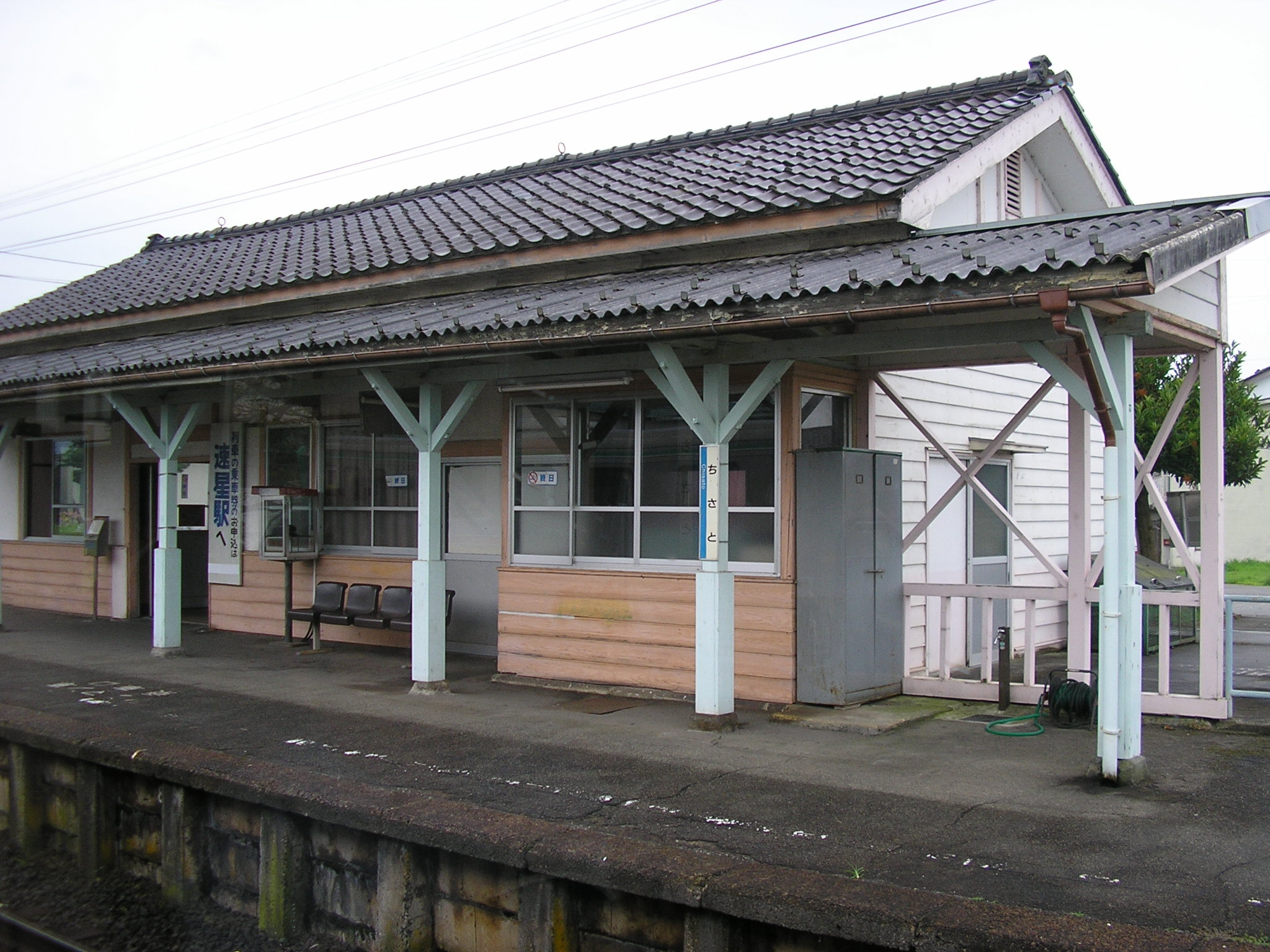
- Chisato Station in July 2006

General information
- Location: 2300 Chisato Fuchu-machi, Toyama-shi, Toyama-ken 939-2622; Japan
- Coordinates: 36°38′04″N 137°07′56″E
- Operator: JR West
- Line: ■ Takayama Main Line
- Distance: 213.6 km from Gifu
- Platforms: 2 side platforms
- Tracks: 2

Construction
- Structure type: At grade

Other information
- Status: Unstaffed
- Website: Official website

History
- Opened: 1 September 1927

Passengers
- FY2015: 396 daily
Location
- Location within Japan

Chisato Station (千里駅, Chisato-eki) is a railway station on the Takayama Main Line in city of Toyama, Japan, operated by West Japan Railway Company (JR West).

== Lines ==
Chisato Station is a station on the Takayama Main Line, and is located 213.6 kilometers from the end of the line at Gifu and 24.4 kilometers from the dividing point on the line between JR West and JR East at Inotani.

== Layout ==
The station has two opposed ground-level side platforms serving two tracks. The station is unattended.

=== Platforms ===
1	■ Takayama Main Line	for Toyama
2	■ Takayama Main Line	for Inotani and Takaoka

== Adjacent stations ==
«	Service	»
JR West
Takayama Main Line
Limited Express "Hida": Does not stop at this station
Etchū-Yatsuo	Local	Hayahoshi

== History ==
The station opened on 1 September 1927. With the privatization of Japanese National Railways (JNR) on 1 April 1987, the station came under the control of JR West.

== Passenger statistics ==
In fiscal 2015, the station was used by an average of 396 passengers daily (boarding passengers only).

== Surrounding area ==
- Kenseimitsu Kogyo

== See also ==
- List of railway stations in Japan
