= Takadabashi Station =

Railway station in Gifu, Gifu Prefecture, Japan

Takadabashi Station 高田橋駅

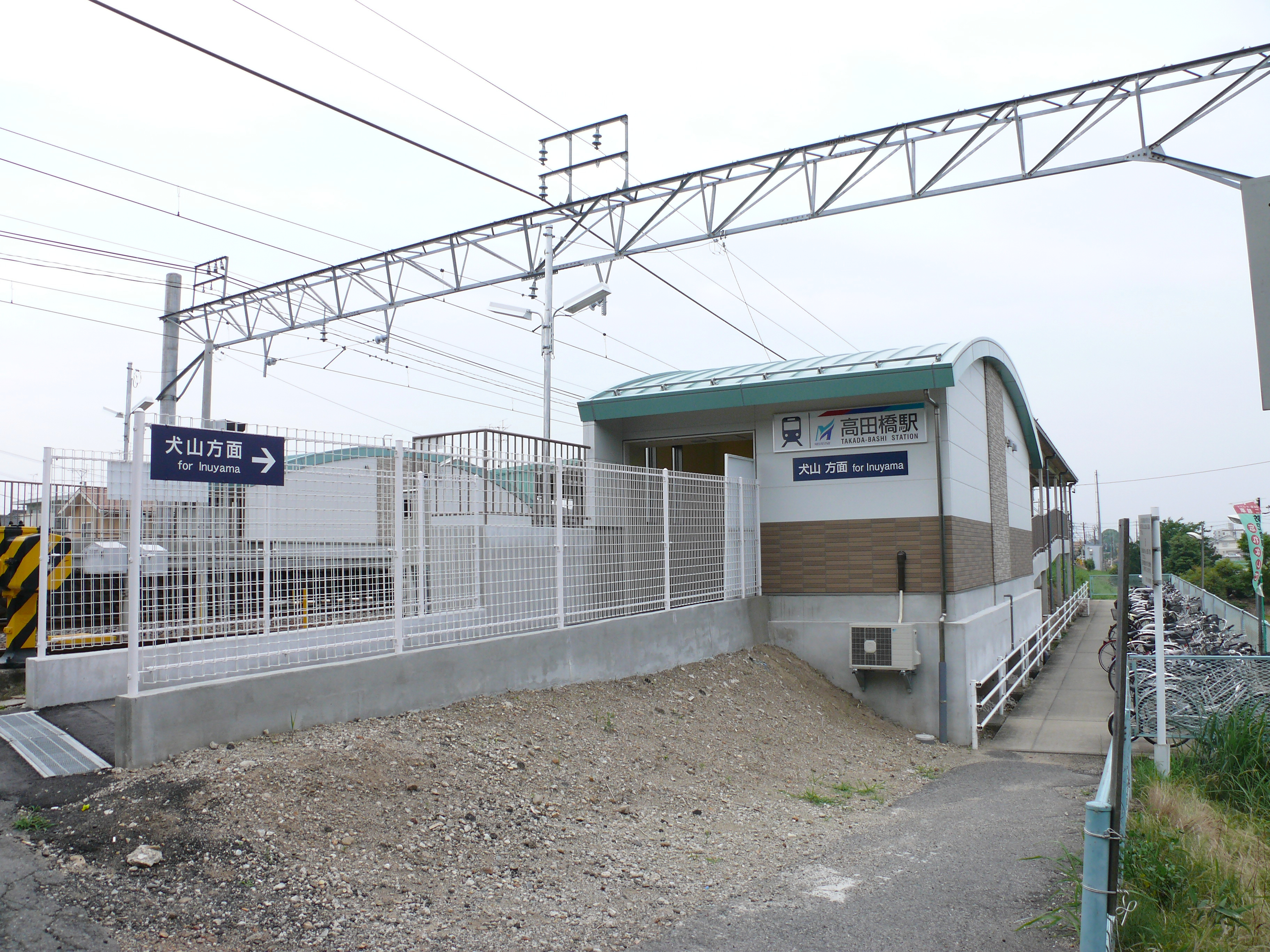
- Takadabashi Station, July 2007

General information
- Location: 2-6-15 Takata, Gifu-shi, Gifu-ken 500-815; Japan
- Coordinates: 35.3984°N 136.8117°E
- Operator: Meitetsu
- Line: ■Meitetsu Kakamigahara Line
- Distance: 5.4 km from Meitetsu-Gifu
- Platforms: 2 side platforms

Other information
- Status: Unstaffed
- Station code: KG12
- Website: Official website (in Japanese)

History
- Opened: January 21, 1926

Passengers
- FY2013: 2607

Services
Preceding station	Meitetsu	Following station
Shin Kanō towards Shin Unuma	Kakamigahara Line Local	Tejikara towards Meitetsu Gifu
Location
- Location within Japan

Takadabashi Station (高田橋駅, Takadabashi-eki) is a railway station located in the city of Gifu, Gifu Prefecture, Japan, operated by the private railway operator Meitetsu.

== Lines ==
Takadabashi Station is a station on the Kakamigahara Line, and is located 5.4 kilometers from the terminus of the line at Meitetsu-Gifu.

== Station layout ==
track layout

Takadabashi Station has two ground-level opposed side platforms. The station is unattended.

=== Platforms ===
1	■ Meitetsu Kakamigahara Line	For Mikakino, Shin-Unuma, and Inuyama
2	■ Meitetsu Kakamigahara Line	For Meitetsu Gifu and Meitetsu-Nagoya

== History ==
Takadabashi Station opened on January 21, 1926.

== Surrounding area ==
- Nakasendō
- Sakai River

== See also ==
- List of railway stations in Japan
