= Tejikara Station =

Railway station in Gifu, Gifu Prefecture, Japan

Tejikara Station 手力駅

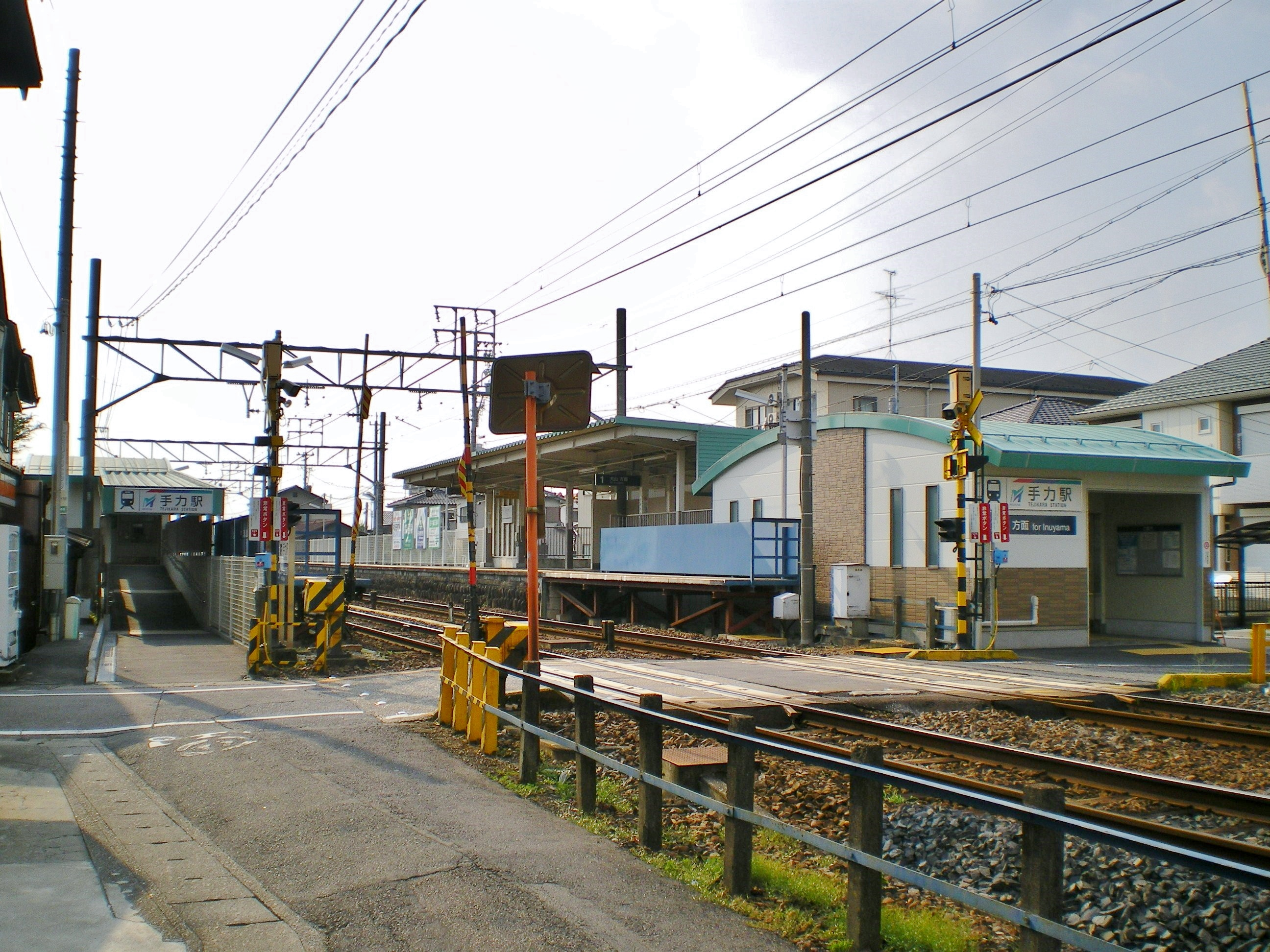
- Tejikara Station, June 2014

General information
- Location: 7-7-12 Kuranomae, Gifu-shi, Gifu-ken 00-8233; Japan
- Coordinates: 35.3983°N 136.8045°E
- Operator: Meitetsu
- Line: ■Meitetsu Kakamigahara Line
- Distance: 4.8 km from Meitetsu-Gifu
- Platforms: 2 side platforms

Other information
- Status: Unstaffed
- Station code: KG13
- Website: Official website (in Japanese)

History
- Opened: January 21, 1926

Passengers
- FY2013: 1357

Services
Preceding station	Meitetsu	Following station
Takadabashi towards Shin Unuma	Kakamigahara Line Local	Kiridōshi towards Meitetsu Gifu
Location
- Location within Japan

Tejikara Station (手力駅, Tejikara-eki) is a railway station located in the city of Gifu, Gifu Prefecture, Japan, operated by the private railway operator Meitetsu.

== Lines ==
Tejikara Station is a station on the Kakamigahara Line, and is located 4.8 kilometers from the terminus of the line at Meitetsu-Gifu.

== Station layout ==
track layout

Tejikara Station has two ground-level opposed side platforms connected by a level crossing. The station is unattended.

=== Platforms ===
1	■ Meitetsu Kakamigahara Line	For Mikakino, Shin-Unuma, and Inuyama
2	■ Meitetsu Kakamigahara Line	For Meitetsu Gifu and Meitetsu-Nagoya

== History ==
Tejikara Station opened on January 21, 1926.

== Surrounding area ==
- Nagamori Station on the Takayama Main Line

== See also ==
- List of railway stations in Japan
