= Inazawa Station =

Railway station in Inazawa, Aichi Prefecture, Japan

CA71 Inazawa Station 稲沢駅
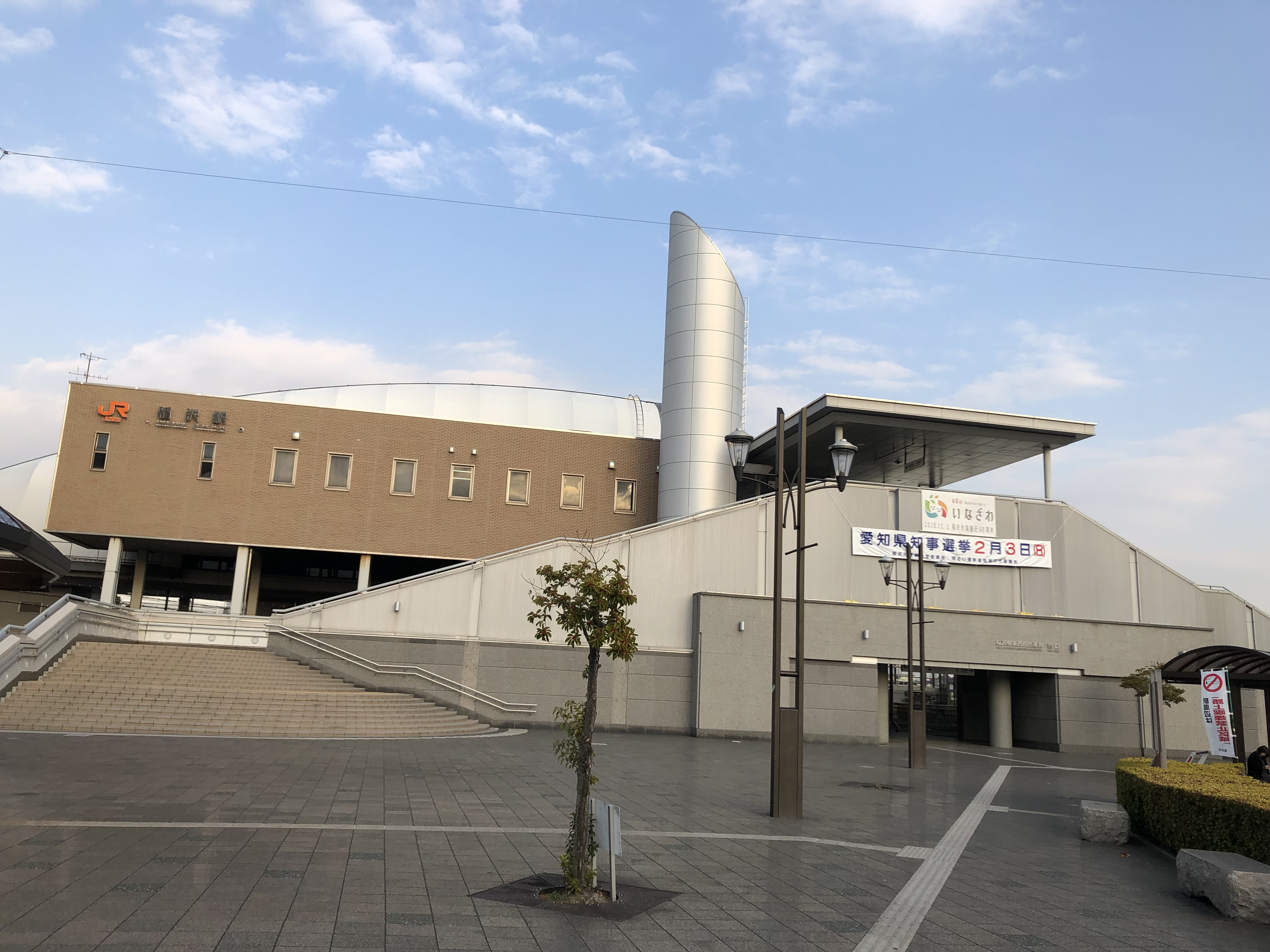
- Inazawa Station in 2019

General information
- Location: 1-9-1 Ekimae, Inazawa-shi, Aichi-ken 492-8143; Japan
- Coordinates: 35.2535°N 136.8208°E
- Operator: JR Central
- Line: Tokaido Main Line
- Distance: 377.1 kilometers from Tokyo
- Platforms: 1 island platform

Other information
- Status: Staffed
- Station code: CA71
- Website: Official website

History
- Opened: August 5, 1904

Passengers
- 2023–2024: 16,755 daily

Services
Preceding station	JR Central	Following station
Owari-Ichinomiya towards Maibara	Tōkaidō Main Line Local	Kiyosu towards Atami
Location
- Location within Aichi Prefecture Location within Japan

Inazawa Station (稲沢駅, Inazawa-eki) is a railway station in the city of Inazawa, Aichi Prefecture, Japan, operated by Central Japan Railway Company (JR Tōkai).

Inazawa Station is served by the Tōkaidō Main Line, and is located 377.1 kilometers from the starting point of the line at Tokyo Station.

== Station layout ==
The station has an island platform connected to the station building by a footbridge. The station building has automated ticket machines, TOICA automated turnstiles and a staffed ticket office.

=== Platforms ===
1	■ Tōkaidō Main Line	For Gifu and Ōgaki
2	■ Tōkaidō Main Line	For Okazaki, Nagoya

== History ==
Inazawa Station was opened on August 5, 1904 as a station on the Japanese Government Railway (JGR) Tōkaidō Line. The JGR became the JNR after World War II. The station building was rebuilt in March 1953. Along with the division and privatization of JNR on April 1, 1987, the station came under the control and operation of the Central Japan Railway Company. A new station building was completed in April 2000.

Station numbering was introduced to the section of the Tōkaidō Line operated JR Central in March 2018; Inazawa Station was assigned station number CA71.

== Passenger statistics ==
In fiscal 2017, the station was used by an average of 9130 passengers daily.

== Surrounding area ==
Inazawa Station is located approximately two kilometers east of the city center of Inazawa.

== See also ==
- List of railway stations in Japan
