= Kisogawa Station =

Railway station in Ichinomiya, Aichi Prefecture, Japan

CA73 Kisogawa Station 木曽川駅
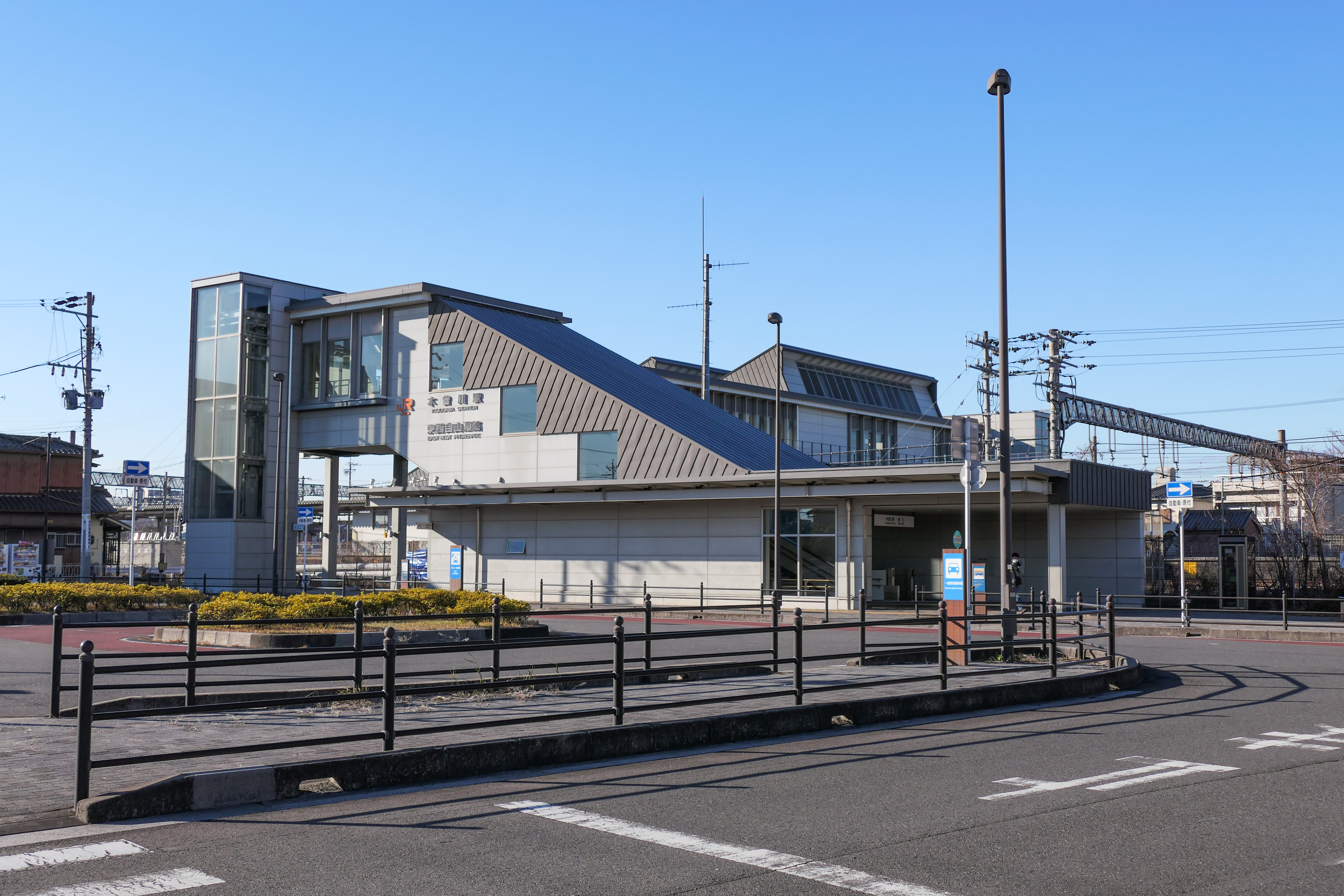
- East side of Kisogawa Station in 2022

General information
- Location: Higashihariguchi-12 Kisogawachō Kuroda, Ichinomiya-shi, Aichi-ken 493-0001; Japan
- Coordinates: 35.3494°N 136.7808°E
- Operator: JR Central
- Line: Tokaido Main Line
- Distance: 388.6 kilometers from Tokyo
- Platforms: 1 island platform

Other information
- Status: Staffed
- Station code: CA73
- Website: Official website

History
- Opened: 1 June 1886

Passengers
- 2023–2024: 7,734 daily
Location
- Location within Aichi Prefecture Location within Japan

Kisogawa Station (木曽川駅, Kisogawa-eki) is a railway station in the city of Ichinomiya, Aichi Prefecture, Japan, operated by Central Japan Railway Company (JR Tōkai).

== Lines ==
Kisogawa Station is served by the Tōkaidō Main Line, and is located 388.6 kilometers from the starting point of the line at Tokyo Station.

== Station layout ==
The station has one island platform with an elevated station building by a footbridge. The station building has automated ticket machines, TOICA automated turnstiles and is staffed.

=== Platforms ===
1	■ Tokaido Main Line	for Gifu and Ōgaki
2	■ Tokaido Main Line	for Nagoya and Okazaki

== Adjacent stations ==
«	Service	»
Tokaido Main Line
Special Rapid: Does not stop at this station
New Rapid: Does not stop at this station
Rapid: Does not stop at this station
Sectional Rapid: Does not stop at this station
Limited Express "Hida": Does not stop at this station
Owari-Ichinomiya	Local	Gifu

== Station history ==
The station opened on 1 June 1886. With the privatization of Japanese National Railways (JNR) on 1 April 1987, the station came under the control of JR Central.

Station numbering was introduced to the section of the Tōkaidō Line operated JR Central in March 2018; Kisogawa Station was assigned station number CA73.

== Surrounding area ==
- Kuroda Elementary School
- Kisogawa Hospital

== See also ==
- List of railway stations in Japan
