= Hozumi Station =

Railway station in Mizuho, Gifu Prefecture, Japan

CA76 Hozumi Station 穂積駅
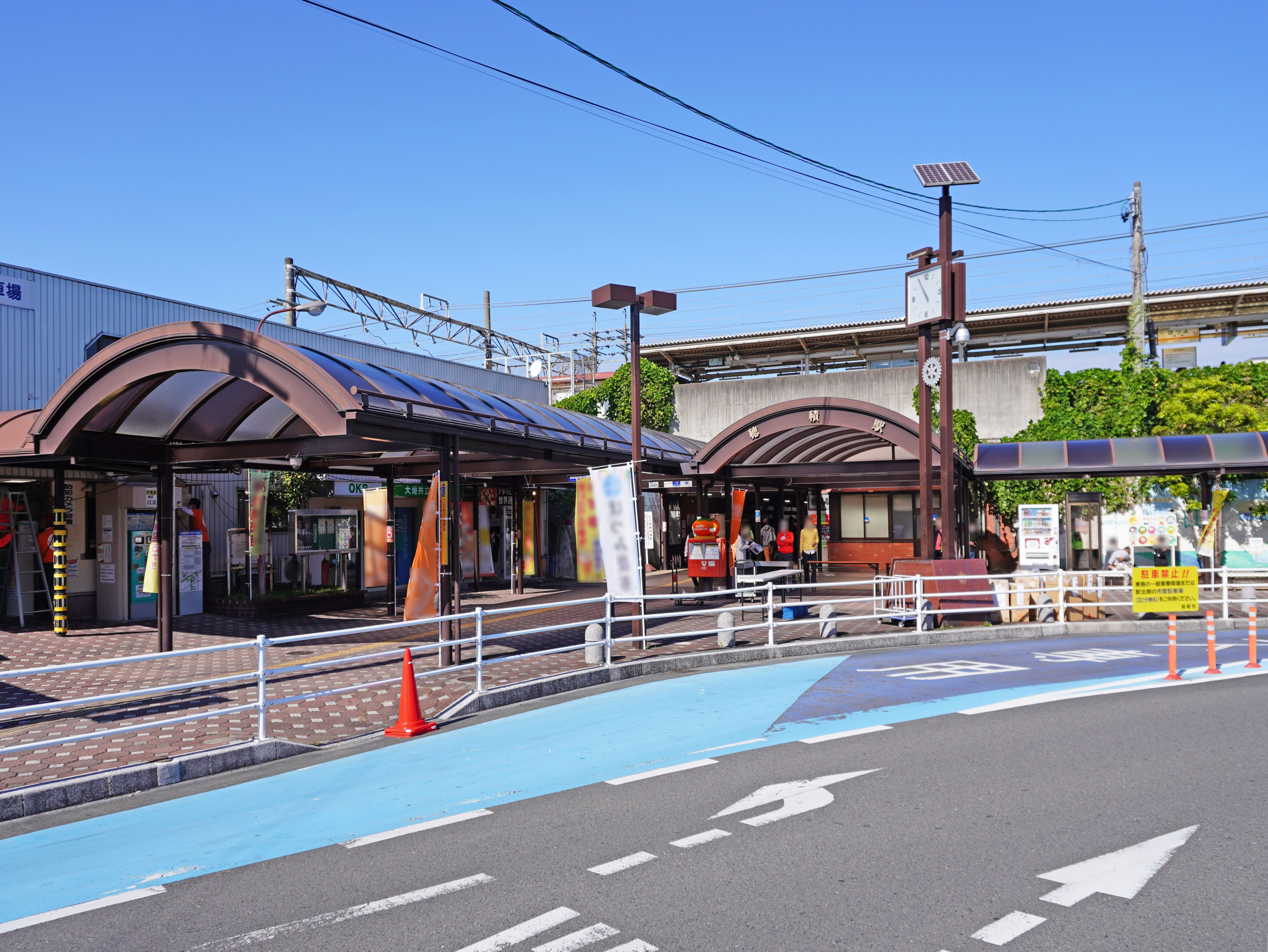
- Hozumi Station south exit, November 2022

General information
- Location: 370 Beppu, Mizuho-shi, Gifu-ken 501-0222; Japan
- Coordinates: 35.3961°N 136.6933°E
- Operator: JR Central; Japan Freight Railway Company
- Line: Tōkaidō Main Line
- Distance: 402.3 km from Tokyo
- Platforms: 1 island platform
- Tracks: 2

Other information
- Status: Staffed (Midori no Madoguchi)
- Website: railway.jr-central.co.jp/station-guide/tokai/hozumi/index.html

History
- Opened: August 1, 1906

Passengers
- 2023–2024: 17,111 daily
Location
- Location within Gifu Prefecture Location within Japan

Hozumi Station (穂積駅, Hozumi-eki) is a train station in the city of Mizuho, Gifu Prefecture, Japan, operated by Central Japan Railway Company (JR Tōkai), with a freight terminal operated by the Japan Freight Railway Company.

== Lines ==
Hozumi Station is served by the JR Tōkai Tōkaidō Main Line, and is located 402.3 kilometers from the official starting point of the line at Tokyo.

== Station layout ==
Hozumi Station has one elevated island platform with the station building located underneath. The station has a Midori no Madoguchi staffed ticket office.

=== Platforms ===
1	■ Tōkaidō Main Line	For Ōgaki and Maibara
2	■ Tōkaidō Main Line	For Gifu, Nagoya, and Okazaki

== Adjacent stations ==
«	Service	»
Central Japan Railway Company
Tōkaidō Main Line
Limited Express "Hida": Does not stop at this station
Nishi-Gifu	Special Rapid	Ōgaki
Nishi-Gifu	New Rapid	Ōgaki
Nishi-Gifu	Rapid	Ōgaki
Nishi-Gifu	Sectional Rapid	Ōgaki
Nishi-Gifu	Local	Ōgaki

== History ==
Hozumi Station opened on August 1, 1906. The station was absorbed into the JR Tōkai network upon the privatization of the Japanese National Railways (JNR) on April 1, 1987.

Station numbering was introduced to the section of the Tōkaidō Line operated by JR Central in March 2018; Hozumi Station was assigned station number CA76.

== Passenger statistics ==
In fiscal 2016, the station was used by an average of 8227 passengers daily (boarding passengers only).

== Surrounding area ==
- Mizuho City Hall
- Nagara River

== See also ==
- List of railway stations in Japan
