= Nishi-Gifu Station =

Railway station in Gifu, Gifu Prefecture, Japan

CA75 Nishi-Gifu Station 西岐阜駅
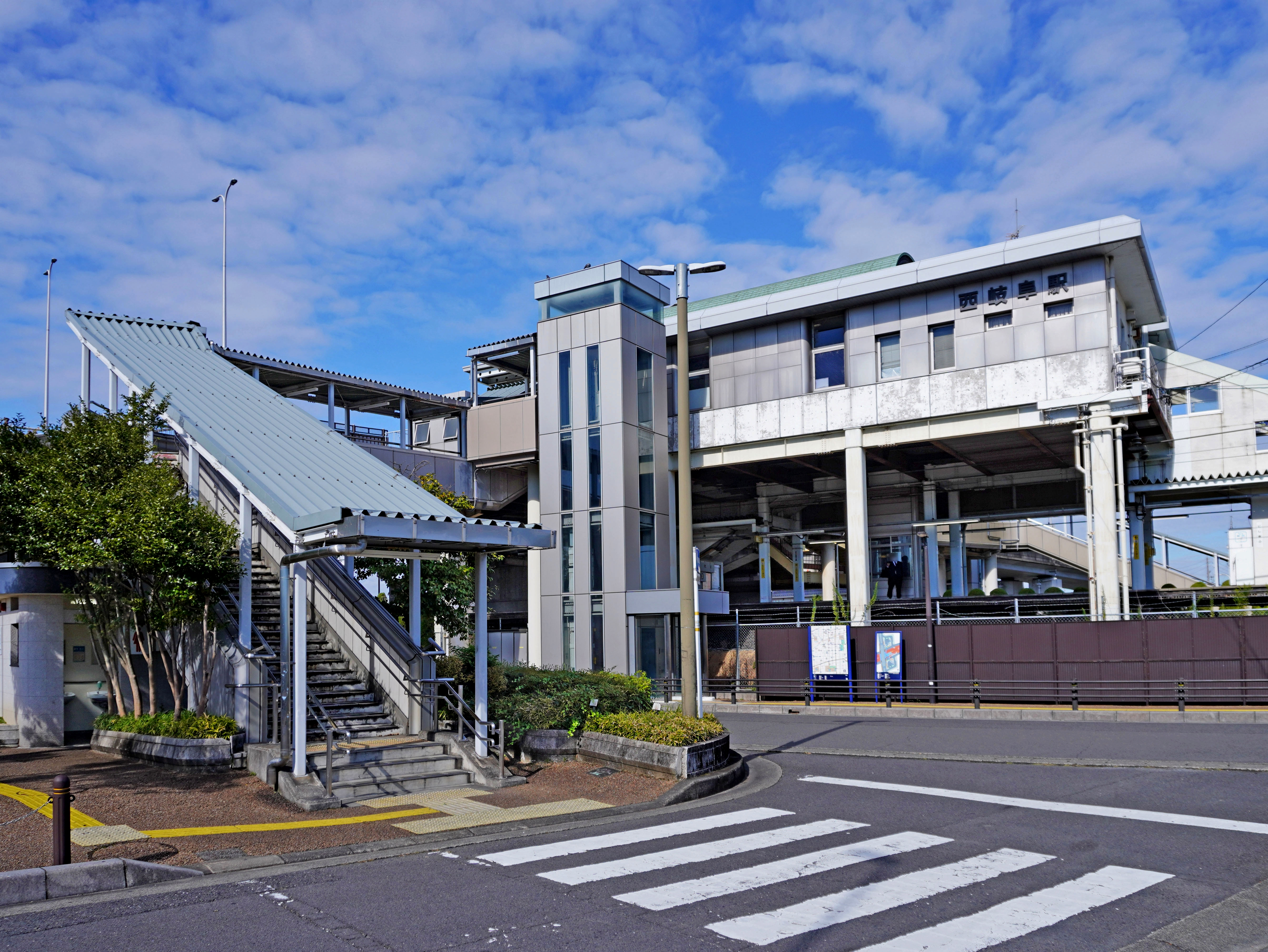
- Nishi-Gifu Station in November 2022

General information
- Location: 4-14-40 Ichihashi, Gifu-shi, Gifu-ken 500-8381; Japan
- Coordinates: 35.4046698°N 136.7234266°E
- Operator: JR Central
- Line: Tōkaidō Main Line
- Distance: 399.5 km from Tokyo
- Platforms: 1 island platform
- Tracks: 2

Other information
- Status: Staffed (Midori no Madoguchi)
- Website: Official website

History
- Opened: November 1, 1986

Passengers
- 2023–2024: 11,427 daily
Location
- Location within Gifu Prefecture Location within Japan

Nishi-Gifu Station (西岐阜駅, Nishi Gifu-eki) is a railway station operated by Central Japan Railway Company (JR Central) and is located in the western part of the city of Gifu, Gifu Prefecture, Japan.

== Lines ==
Nishi-Gifu Station is served by the JR Tōkai Tōkaidō Main Line, and is located 399.5 kilometers from the official starting point of the line at Tokyo. Along with Gifu Station and Nagamori Station, it is one of the three JR Central stations in the city of Gifu.

== Layout ==
There is one elevated island platform with the station building located underneath. The station has a Midori no Madoguchi staffed ticket office.

=== Platforms ===
1	■ Tōkaidō Main Line	For Ōgaki and Maibara
2	■ Tōkaidō Main Line	For Gifu, Nagoya and Okazaki

== Adjacent stations ==
«	Service	»
Central Japan Railway Company
Tōkaidō Main Line
Limited Express "Hida": Does not stop at this station
Gifu	Special Rapid	Hozumi
Gifu	New Rapid	Hozumi
Gifu	Rapid	Hozumi
Gifu	Sectional Rapid	Hozumi
Gifu	Local	Hozumi

== History ==
Nishi-Gifu Station was first opened on 1 November 1986 as part of Japan National Railways. On 1 April 1987, it became part of JR Central. In the latter half of 2006, the station underwent remodeling, which added elevators for public use, as well as TOICA-supported ticket machines.

Station numbering was introduced to the section of the Tōkaidō Line operated JR Central in March 2018; Nishi-Gifu Station was assigned station number CA75.

== Passenger statistics ==
In fiscal 2016, the station was used by an average of 6011 passengers daily (boarding passengers only).

== Surrounding area ==
- Museum of Fine Arts, Gifu

== Bus services ==
On the south side of Nishi-Gifu Station is a stop for the free Fureai Bus, which connects passengers with the Gifu Prefectural Office and other stops in between. They can also board the Nishi-Gifu Kurukuru Bus, which runs through the local community. Gifu Bus Co., Ltd. has a bus stop near the main entrance, connecting the station with many areas throughout the city.

== See also ==
- List of railway stations in Japan
