= Shubun University =

Japan private university

- 修文大学
- Type: Private
- Established: 2008
- President: Tadashi Sasaki
- Location: Ichinomiya, Aichi, Japan; 35.301°N 136.782°E
- Website: www.shubun.ac.jp (in Japanese)

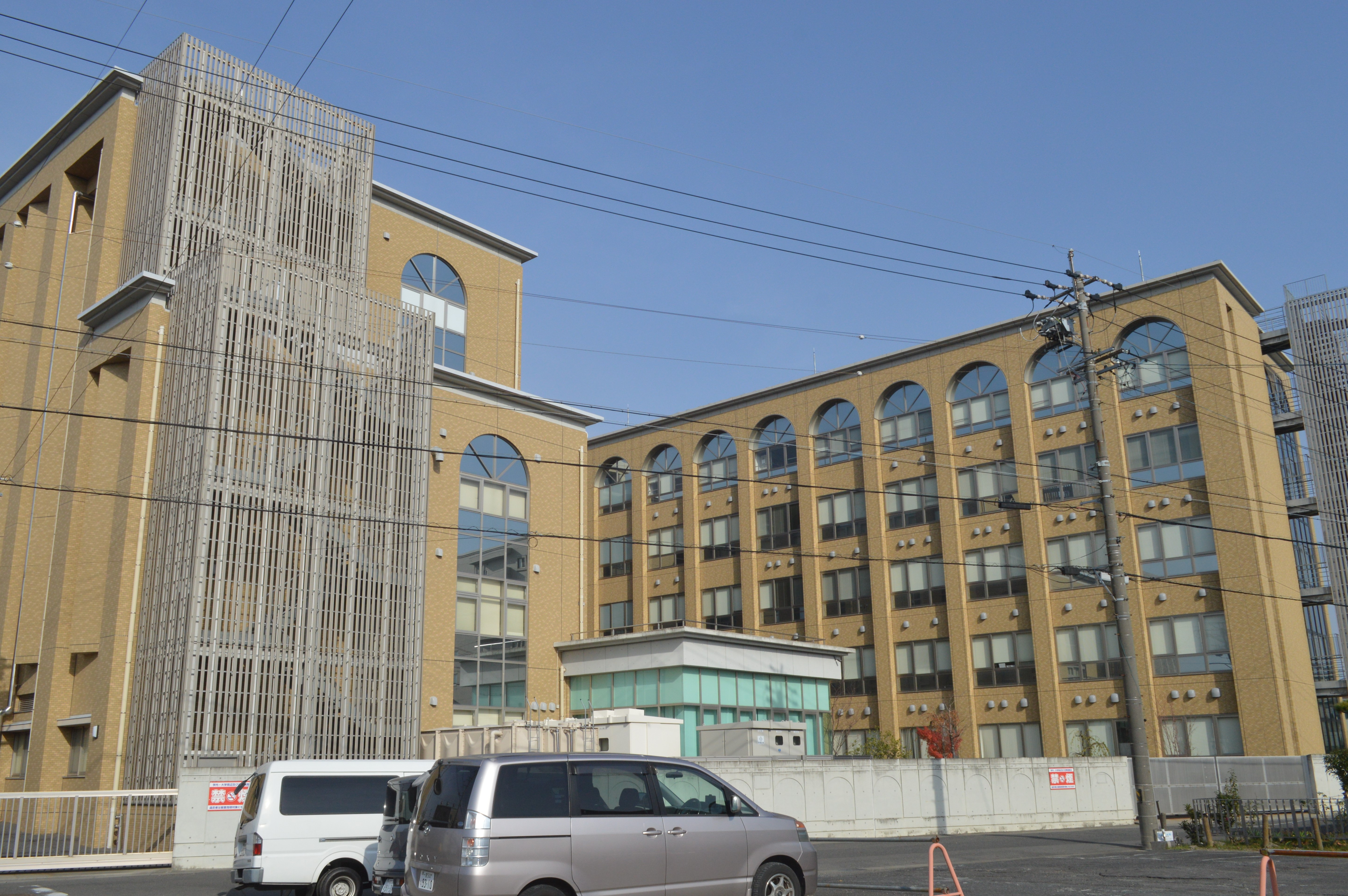
Shubun university

Shubun University (修文大学, Shūbun daigaku) is a private university in the city of Ichinomiya, Aichi, Japan, established in 2008.

== Undergraduate program ==
Faculty of Health and Nutrition

- Department of Nutrition

Faculty of Nursing

- Department of Nursing
