= Gifu Station =

Railway station in Gifu, Gifu Prefecture, Japan

CA74 CG00 Gifu Station 岐阜駅
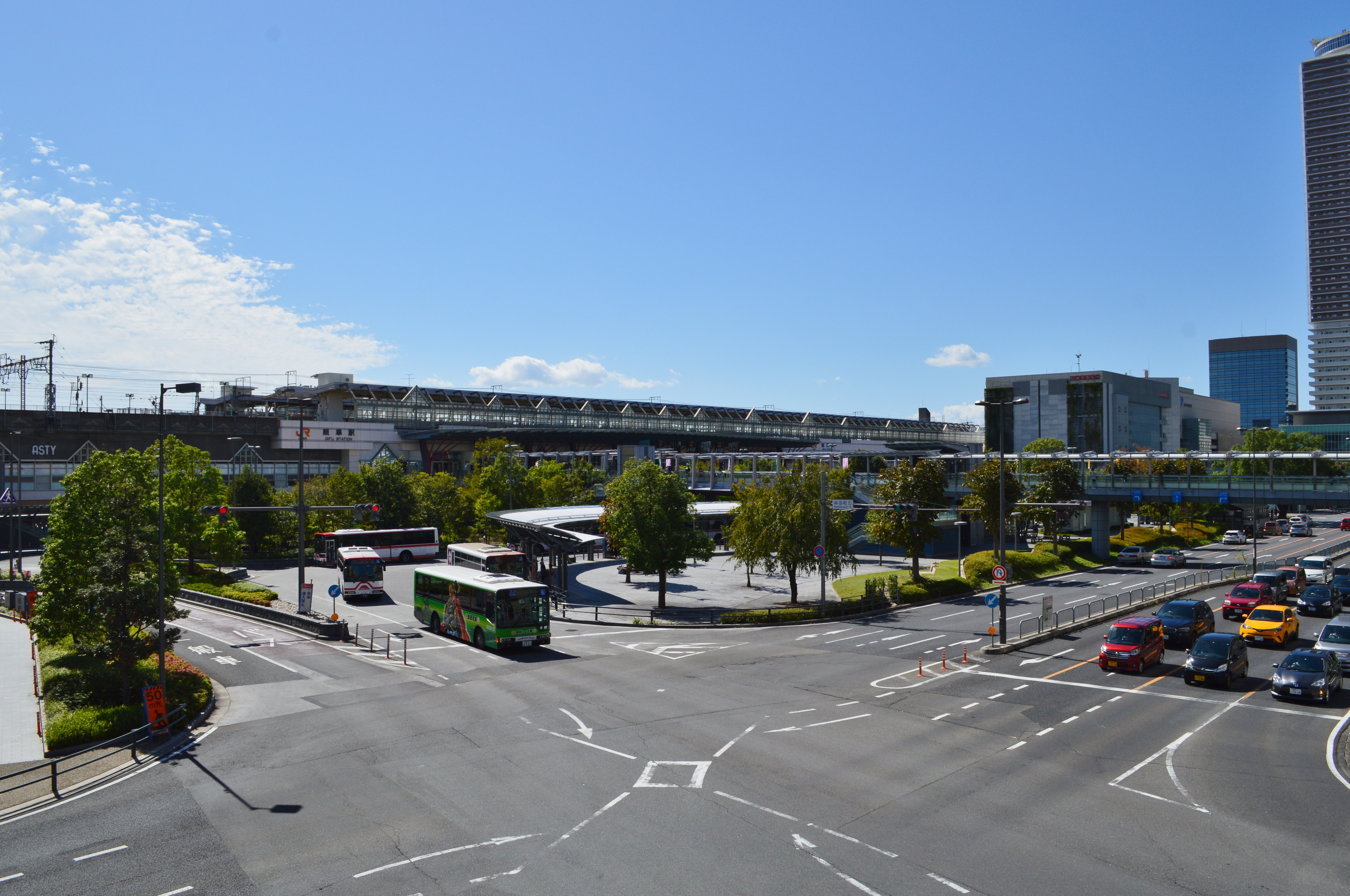
- Gifu Station in September 2017

General information
- Location: Hashimoto 1-chome, Gifu City, Gifu Prefecture 500-8856; Japan
- Coordinates: 35.409514°N 136.75652°E
- Operator: JR Central
- Lines: Tōkaidō Main Line; Takayama Line
- Distance: 396.3 km (246.2 mi) from Tokyo
- Platforms: 3 island platforms
- Tracks: 6

Other information
- Status: Staffed (Midori no Madoguchi)
- Station code: CA74; CG00
- Website: Official website

History
- Opened: 21 January 1887; 139 years ago
- Former names: Kanō (until 1888)

Passengers
- 2023–2024: 56,753 daily
Location
- Location within Gifu Prefecture Location within Chubu region Location within Japan

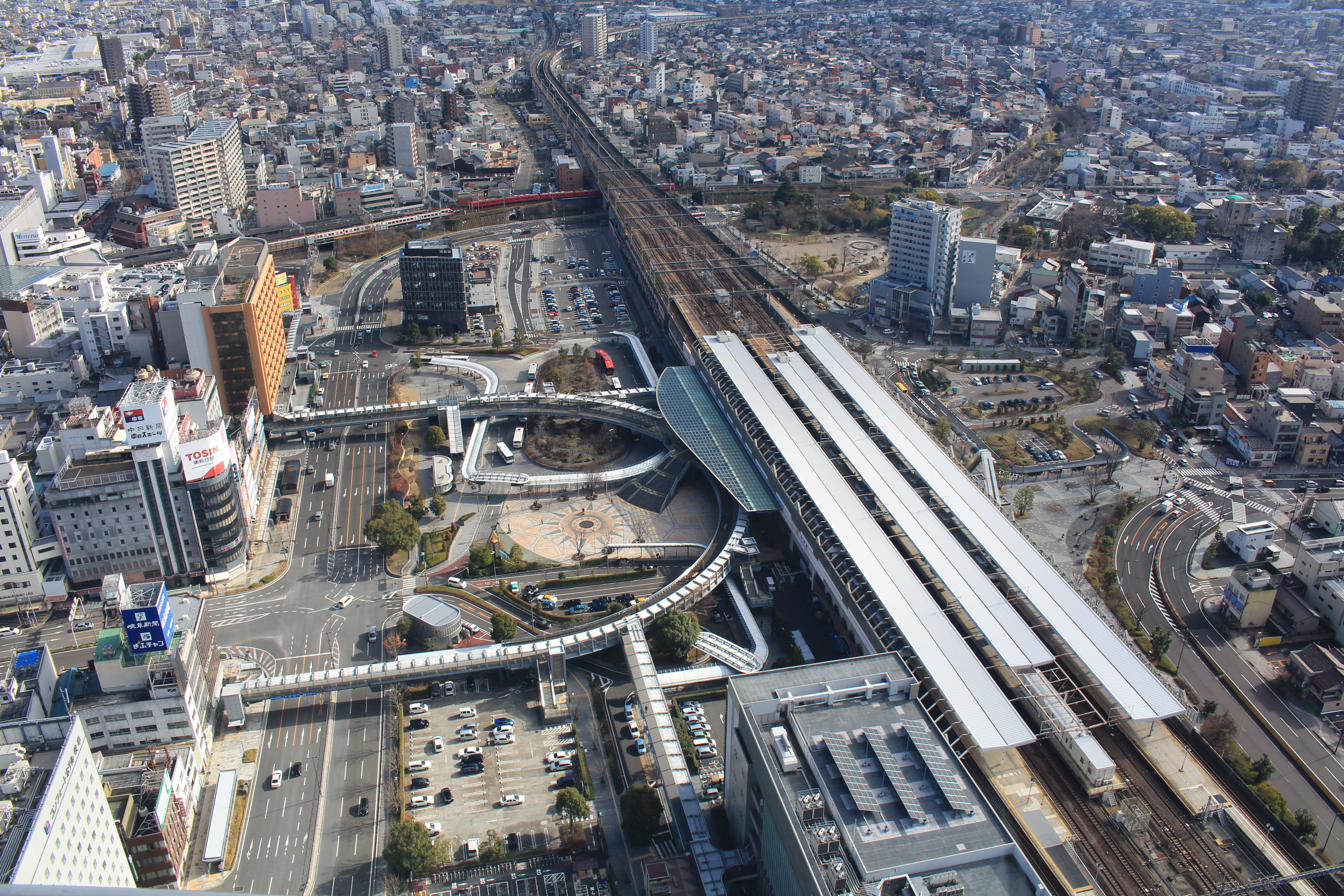
JR Gifu Station seen from Gifu City Tower 43

Gifu Station (岐阜駅, Gifu-eki) is a railway station in the heart of the city of Gifu, Gifu Prefecture, Japan, operated by Central Japan Railway Company (JR Central).

== Lines ==
Gifu Station is served by the JR Central Tōkaidō Main Line, and is located 396.3 kilometers from the official starting point of the line at Tokyo. It is also the terminal station for the Takayama Main Line. Along with Nishi-Gifu Station and Nagamori Station, it is one of the three JR Central stations in the city of Gifu.

== Station layout ==
The station consists of three elevated island platforms serving six tracks for the Tōkaidō Main Line and Takayama Main Line, with the station building underneath. The station has a Midori no Madoguchi staffed ticket office.

=== Platforms ===
Track layout

1	■ Tōkaidō Main Line	for Nagoya and Okazaki (including limited express Shirasagi for Nagoya) extra rapid Moonlight Nagara for Tokyo
2	■ Tōkaidō Main Line	for Nagoya and Okazaki (including limited express Hida for Nagoya)
3	■ Takayama Line	for Mino-Ōta, Gero and Takayama
3	■ Tōkaidō Main Line	for Nagoya and Okazaki (partly)
4	■ Takayama Line	for Mino-Ōta and Takayama limited express Hida for Mino-Ōta, Takayama and Toyama via the Takayama Line
4	■ Tōkaidō Main Line	starting for Nagoya and Okazaki for Ōgaki and Maibara limited express Hida 36 for Ōsaka
5	■ Tōkaidō Main Line	for Ōgaki and Maibara starting for Nagoya and Okazaki
6	■ Tōkaidō Main Line	for Ōgaki and Maibara

== Adjacent stations ==
«	Service	»
Tōkaidō Main Line
Kisogawa	Local	Nishi-Gifu
Owari-Ichinomiya	Semi Rapid; Rapid; New Rapid; Special Rapid	Nishi-Gifu
Owari-Ichinomiya	Home Liner	Hozumi
Owari-Ichinomiya or Nagoya or Takayama Main Line	Limited Express Hida	Takayama Main Line or Ogaki
Owari-Ichinomiya	Limited Express Shirasagi	Ogaki
Takayama Main Line
Terminus	Local	Nagamori
Tōkaidō Main Line	Limited Express Hida	Unuma or Mino-Ōta

== History ==
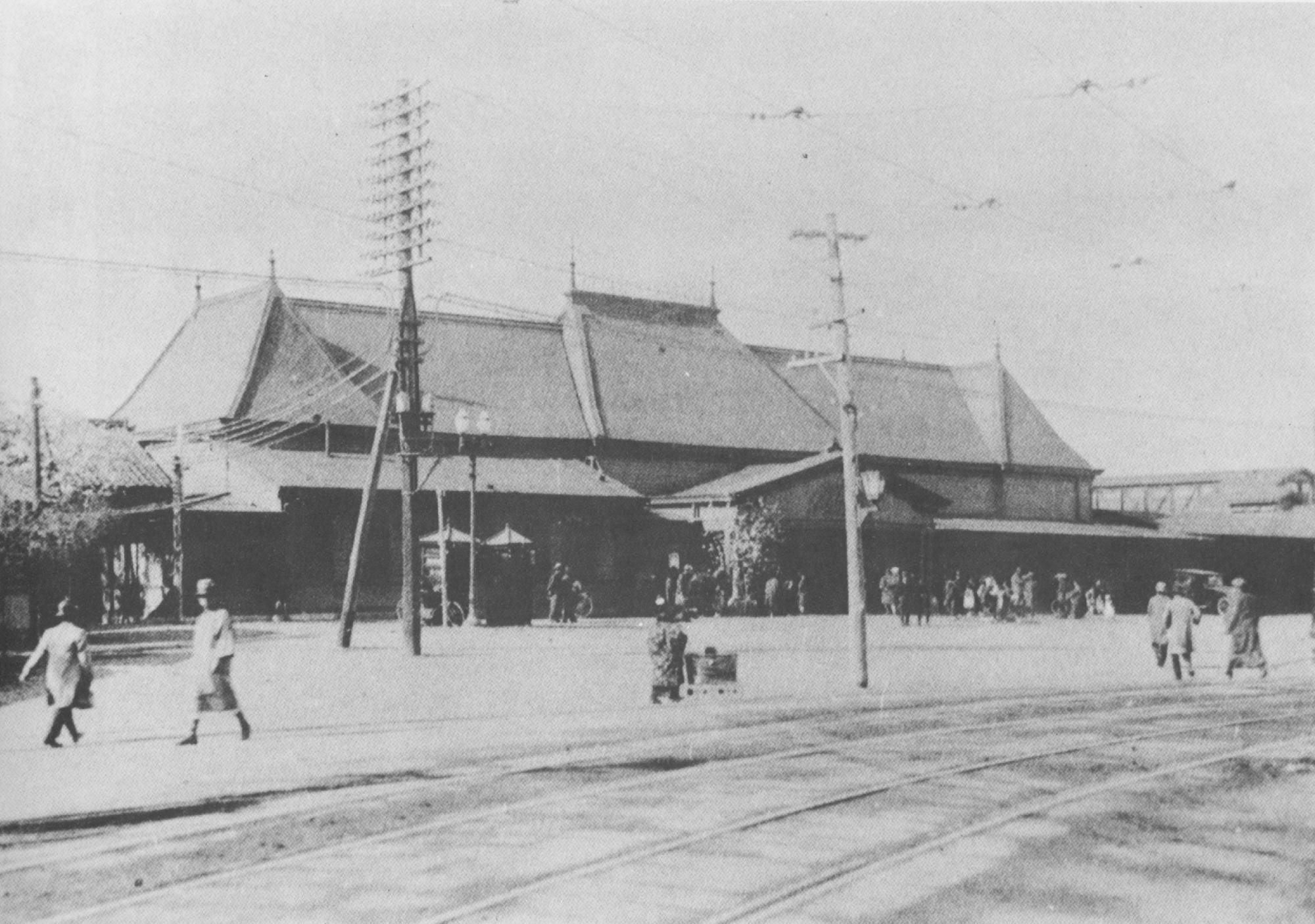
Gifu Station circa 1919

The station first opened on January 21, 1887, named Kanō Station (加納駅) and was primarily used for the transport of goods. On December 15, 1888, it became a passenger rail station, at which point its name was changed to Gifu Station. On July 22, 1913, the former Aichi Station building, which closed in 1909, was moved to the area that is now the south side of Gifu Station. This station was used until it was burned to the ground during the firebombings of Gifu City in 1945. On April 1, 1987, it became part of JR Central. On November 1, 1986, construction of the elevated rail lines began, with construction ending on March 2, 1996. The station was extensively remodelled in 2008.

Station numbering was introduced to the section of the Tōkaidō Line operated JR Central as well as the Takayama Main Line in March 2018; Gifu Station was assigned station number CA74 for the Tōkaidō Main Line and CG00 for the Takayama Main Line.

== Passenger statistics ==
In fiscal 2016, the station was used by an average of 31,742 passengers daily (boarding passengers only).

== Surrounding area ==
- Meitetsu Gifu Station
- National Route 157

== Bus services ==
On the north side of JR Gifu Station are bus boarding platforms for all of the bus lines belonging to Gifu Bus, Co., Ltd. There are 15 bus boarding platforms in all, with 12 serving bus lines to different parts of Gifu and its surrounding municipalities. The first two platforms are only for alighting and the last one is currently not being used.

== See also ==
- List of railway stations in Japan
