= List of mergers in Gifu Prefecture =

Here is a list of mergers in Gifu Prefecture, Japan since the Heisei era.

== Mergers from April 1, 1999 to Present ==
- On April 1, 2003 - the towns of Miyama and Takatomi, and the village of Ijira (all from Yamagata District) were merged to create the city of Yamagata. Yamagata District was dissolved as a result of this merger.
- On May 1, 2003 - the towns of Hozumi and Sunami (both from Motosu District) were merged to create the city of Mizuho.
- On February 1, 2004 - the former town of Motosu absorbed the towns of Itonuki, Neo and Shinsei (all from Motosu District) were merged to create the city of Motosu.
- On February 1, 2004 - the towns of Furukawa and Kamioka, and the villages of Kawai and Miyagawa (all from Yoshiki District) were merged to create the city of Hida.
- On March 1, 2004 - the towns of Hachiman, Shirotori and Yamato, and the villages of Meihō, Minami, Takasu and Wara (all from Gujō District) were merged to create the city of Gujō. Gujō District was dissolved as a result of this merger.
- On March 1, 2004 - the former town of Gero absorbed the towns of Hagiwara, Kanayama and Osaka, and the village of Maze (all from Mashita District) merged to form the city of Gero. Mashita District was dissolved as a result of this merger.
- On October 25, 2004 - the old city of Ena absorbed the towns of Akechi, Iwamura, Kamiyahagi and Yamaoka, and the village of Kushihara (all from Ena District) to create the new and expanded city of Ena.
- On November 1, 2004 - the town of Kawashima (from Hashima District) was merged into the expanded city of Kakamigahara.
- On January 31, 2005 - the old town of Ibigawa absorbed the villages of Fujihashi, Kasuga, Kuze, Sakauchi and Tanigumi (all from Ibi District) to create the new and expanded town of Ibigawa.
- On February 1, 2005 - The old city of Takayama absorbed the town of Kuguno, the villages of Asahi, Kiyomi, Miya, Nyūkawa, Shōkawa and Takane (all from Ōno District), the town of Kokufu, and the village of Kamitakara (both from Yoshiki District) to create the new and expanded city of Takayama. Yoshiki District was dissolved as a result of this merger.
- On February 7, 2005 - the towns of Mugegawa and Mugi, and the villages of Horado, Itadori and Kaminoho (all from Mugi District) were merged into the expanded city of Seki. Mugi District was dissolved as a result of this merger.
- On February 13, 2005 - the towns Fukuoka, Sakashita and Tsukechi, and the villages of Hirukawa, Kashimo and Kawaue (all from Ena District); along with the village of Yamaguchi (from Kiso District, Nagano Prefecture), were merged into the expanded city of Nakatsugawa. Ena District was dissolved as a result of this merger.
- On March 28, 2005 - the former town of Kaizu absorbed the towns of Hirata and Nannō (all from Kaizu District) to create the city of Kaizu. Kaizu District was dissolved as a result of this merger.
- On May 1, 2005 - the town of Kaneyama (from Kani District) was merged into the expanded city of Kani.
- On January 1, 2006 - the town of Yanaizu (from Hashima District) was merged into the expanded city of Gifu.
- On January 23, 2006 - the town of Kasahara (from Toki District) was merged into the expanded city of Tajimi. Toki District was dissolved as a result of this merger.
- On March 27, 2006 - the town of Kamiishizu (from Yōrō District), and the town of Sunomata (from Anpachi District) were merged into the city of Ōgaki.
