= Ena, Gifu =

Ena 恵那市
- City
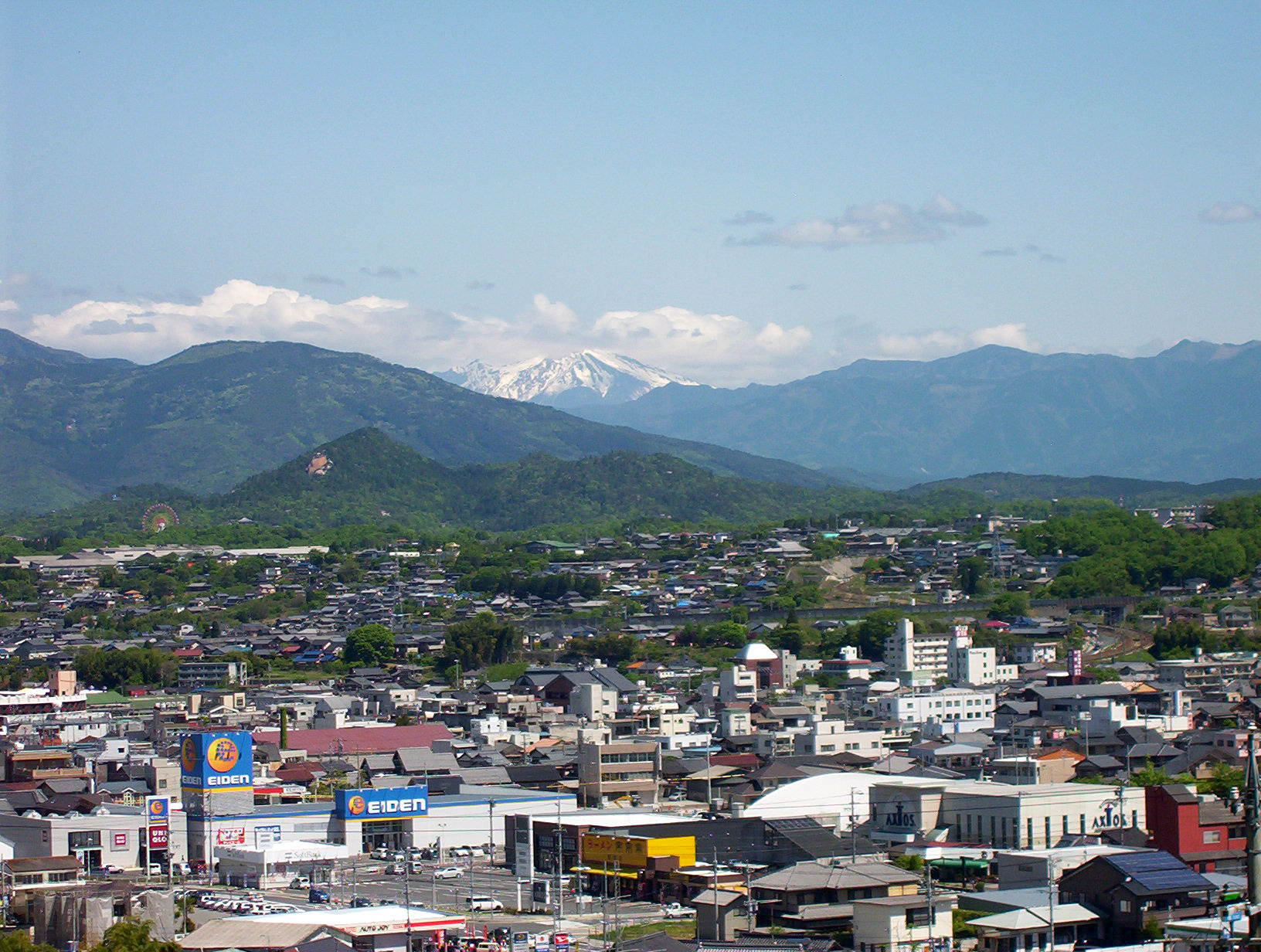
- View of central Ena, Ena Valley Amusement Park and Mount Ontake

- Flag Seal
- Interactive map of Ena
- Coordinates: 35°26′57.3″N 137°24′46.2″E
- Country: Japan
- Region: Chūbu
- Prefecture: Gifu

Government
  - Mayor: Yoshiaki Kachi

Area
  - Total: 504.24 km^{2} (194.69 sq mi)

Population (June 1, 2019)
  - Total: 48,777
  - Density: 96.734/km^{2} (250.54/sq mi)
- Time zone: UTC+9 (Japan Standard Time)
- Phone number: 0573-26-2111
- Address: 1-1-1 Shōge, Osashima-chō, Ena-shi, Gifu-ken 509-7292
- Climate: Cfa
- Website: Official website
- Symbols
- Flower: bamboo lily
- Tree: Japanese red maple

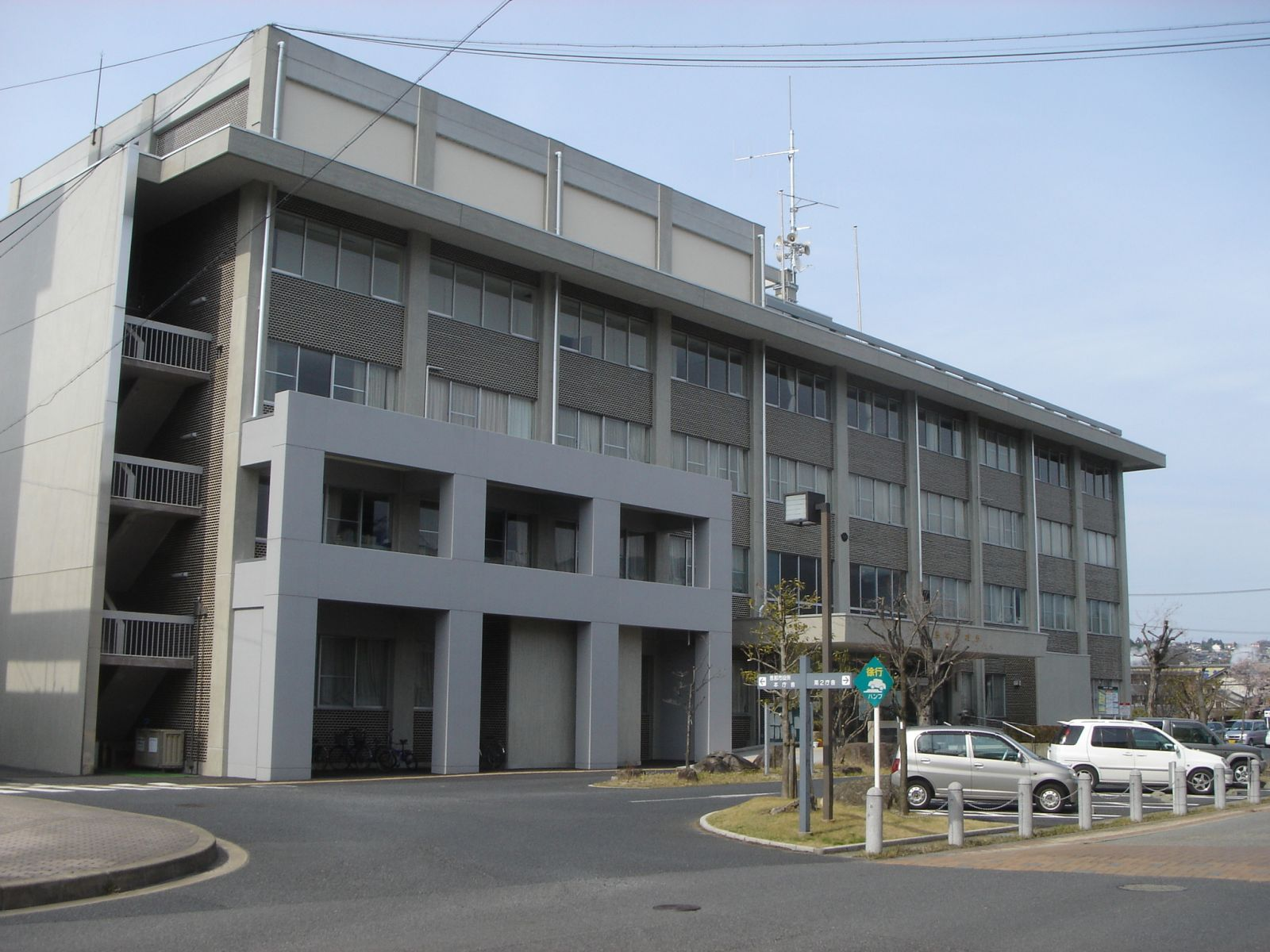
Ena City Office

Ena (恵那市, Ena-shi; Japanese pronunciation: [é̞.nä̀, è̞.nä́.ɕì]) is a city located in Gifu, Japan. As of 1 June 2019, the city had an estimated population of 48,777, and a population density of 96.7 persons per km^{2}, in 19,820 households. The total area of the city was 504.24 square kilometres (194.69 sq mi).

== Geography ==
Ena is located in the Tōnō region of southeastern Gifu Prefecture.

- Mountains: Mount Kasagi, Mount Hoko, Mount Yūdachi, Mount Byōbu, Mount Yake, Mount Mitsumori
- Rivers: Kiso River, Agi River, Kamiyahagi River, Kamimura River, Akechi River, Toki River, Ori River
- Lakes: Ena Gorge, Lake Hokonoko, Lake Agigawa, Lake Okuyahagi, Lake Origawa

=== Neighbouring municipalities ===
- Aichi Prefecture
  - Toyota
- Gifu Prefecture
  - Mizunami
  - Nakatsugawa
  - Shirakawa
  - Yaotsu
- Nagano Prefecture
  - Hiraya
  - Neba

== Climate ==
The city has a climate characterized by characterized by hot and humid summers, and mild winters (Köppen climate classification Cfa). The average annual temperature in Ena is 13.3 °C (55.9 °F). The average annual rainfall is 1,785.1 mm (70.28 in) with July as the wettest month. The temperatures are highest on average in August, at around 25.6 °C (78.1 °F), and lowest in January, at around 1.2 °C (34.2 °F).

Climate data for Ena (1991–2020 normals, extremes 1976–present)
Month	Jan	Feb	Mar	Apr	May	Jun	Jul	Aug	Sep	Oct	Nov	Dec	Year
Record high °C (°F)	17.5 (63.5)	20.9 (69.6)	25.5 (77.9)	29.9 (85.8)	33.3 (91.9)	36.5 (97.7)	38.9 (102.0)	38.5 (101.3)	36.6 (97.9)	31.3 (88.3)	25.0 (77.0)	21.0 (69.8)	38.9 (102.0)
Mean daily maximum °C (°F)	7.2 (45.0)	8.8 (47.8)	13.4 (56.1)	19.3 (66.7)	23.9 (75.0)	26.7 (80.1)	30.3 (86.5)	32.1 (89.8)	27.9 (82.2)	22.1 (71.8)	16.0 (60.8)	9.8 (49.6)	19.8 (67.6)
Daily mean °C (°F)	1.2 (34.2)	2.1 (35.8)	6.2 (43.2)	11.9 (53.4)	17.0 (62.6)	20.8 (69.4)	24.6 (76.3)	25.6 (78.1)	21.8 (71.2)	15.5 (59.9)	9.1 (48.4)	3.5 (38.3)	13.3 (55.9)
Mean daily minimum °C (°F)	−3.5 (25.7)	−3.3 (26.1)	0.0 (32.0)	5.0 (41.0)	10.7 (51.3)	16.1 (61.0)	20.4 (68.7)	21.2 (70.2)	17.4 (63.3)	10.6 (51.1)	3.8 (38.8)	−1.2 (29.8)	8.1 (46.6)
Record low °C (°F)	−12.2 (10.0)	−13.6 (7.5)	−10.0 (14.0)	−4.4 (24.1)	−0.5 (31.1)	5.1 (41.2)	12.7 (54.9)	12.2 (54.0)	4.9 (40.8)	−1.2 (29.8)	−4.8 (23.4)	−10.2 (13.6)	−13.6 (7.5)
Average precipitation mm (inches)	62.0 (2.44)	75.6 (2.98)	136.9 (5.39)	139.5 (5.49)	165.3 (6.51)	215.3 (8.48)	261.3 (10.29)	202.2 (7.96)	228.7 (9.00)	155.4 (6.12)	94.2 (3.71)	68.9 (2.71)	1,785.1 (70.28)
Average precipitation days (≥ 1.0 mm)	8.3	7.8	10.4	10.8	11.2	13.8	14.2	11.4	11.5	10.0	8.3	8.7	126.4
Mean monthly sunshine hours	153.3	159.9	186.3	192.7	195.7	147.8	164.2	199.5	158.7	163.6	157.0	146.6	2,024.4
Source: Japan Meteorological Agency (1991–2020 normals, extremes 1976–present)

== Demographics ==
Per Japanese census data, the population of Ena has declined over the past 40 years.

Historical population
Year	Pop.	±%
1970	57,876	—
1980	59,161	+2.2%
1990	58,044	−1.9%
2000	57,274	−1.3%
2010	53,718	−6.2%
2020	47,774	−11.1%

== History ==
The area around Ena was part of traditional Mino Province, and the name of "Ena" appears in Nara period records, including the Nihon Shoki. During the Edo period, it was mostly controlled by Iwamura Domain, and Ōi-juku developed as a post town on the Nakasendō highway connecting Edo with Kyoto. During the post-Meiji restoration cadastral reforms, the area was organised into Ena District, Gifu.

The city was founded on April 1, 1954, by the merger of two towns (Oi and Osashima) and six villages (Tōnō, Sango, Takenami, Kasagi, Nakano, and Iiji), all from Ena District. On October 25, 2004, Ena absorbed the towns of Akechi, Iwamura, Kamiyahagi and Yamaoka, and the village of Kushihara (all from Ena District) to create the expanded city of Ena.

== Government ==
Ena has a mayor-council form of government with a directly elected mayor and a unicameral city legislature of 18 members.

=== Subdivisions ===
- Akechi-chō (明智町)
- Higashino (東野)
- Iiji-chō (飯地町)
- Iwamura-chō (岩村町)
- Kamiyahagi-chō (上矢作町)
- Kasagi-chō (笠置町)
- Kushihara (串原)
- Misato-chō (三郷町)
- Nakanohō-chō (中野方町)
- Ōi-chō (大井町)
- Osashima-chō (長島町)
- Takenami-chō (武並町)
- Yamaoka-chō (山岡町)

== Economy ==
Ena was noted for its pulp and paper industry for many years. Production of precision instruments dominates the manufacturing sector.

== Education ==
Ena has 14 public elementary schools and eight public middle schools operated by the city government, and three public high schools operated by the Gifu Prefectural Board of Education. The prefecture also operates one special education school. Chubu University maintains a subsidiary campus in Ena.

== Transportation ==
=== Railway ===
- JR Central - Chūō Main Line
  - Takenami – Ena
- Akechi Railway - (Akechi Line):
  - Ena – Higashino – < Iinuma – Agi > – Iibama – Gokuraku – Iwamura – Hanashiro – Yamaoka – Noshi - Akechi)

=== Highway ===
- Chūō Expressway: Ena Interchange - Enakyō Service Area
- National Route 19
- National Route 257
- National Route 363
- National Route 418

== Culture ==
There is a culture of using local hornet larva as food. The dish hebo meshi is made from the hornets. In November of each year, a festival for the hornets is held in Kushihara.

== Local attractions ==
- Agigawa Dam
- Ena Gorge
- Hiroshige Museum of Art, Ena
- Iwamura Castle Ruins
  - Hondōri Iwamura-chō
- Mongol Village
- Nakasendō Ōi-juku
- Nihon Taishō Mura
- Sasayuri no Yu
- Yahagi Dam

== Notable people from Ena ==
- Kiyohiro Araki (member of the House of Councillors)
- Kazuo Nagano (noted fraudster chairman of Toyota Shoji)
- Utako Shimoda (founder of Jissen Women's Educational Institute)
