= Takamine (guitar manufacturer) =

Japanese manufacturer

Takamine Musical Instruments Manufacturing Co., Ltd.
- Formerly: Ozhone Musical Instrument Manufacturing Co., Ltd.
- Type: Private
- Industry: Musical Instruments
- Founded: 1959; 67 years ago in Sakashita, Gifu
- Headquarters: Nakatsugawa, Japan
- Area served: Worldwide
- Key people: Hayami Tahte (president); Mass Hirade (former president); Ichiro Katayama (former president); Hiroshi Sugimura(former president)
- Products: Acoustic & classical guitars; Acoustic basses; Ukuleles; Preamplifiers; Pickups; Transducers
- Number of employees: 90
- Website: takamine.com

Takamine Musical Instruments Manufacturing Co., Ltd. (株式会社 高峰楽器製作所, Kabushiki-gaisha Takamine Gakki Seisakusho; pronounced [takaꜜmine] tah-kah-mee-né) is a Japanese guitar manufacturer based in Nakatsugawa, Gifu, Japan. It's considered to be one of the world's major brands of steel-string acoustic guitars.

In 1978, it was one of the first guitar companies to introduce acoustic-electric models, where they pioneered the design of the preamplifier-equalizer component by introducing its signature "Palathetic Pickup".

== History ==
Originally founded in December 1959 by Ozhone, who previously worked at a stringed instrument factory located in the Nagoya region near the "Japanese Alps". When Typhoon Vera passed by the region with devastating force, Ozhone lost his job at said factory and relocated to his wife's birthplace: Sakashita, where he founded a guitar workshop there named after himself: "Ozhone Musical Instrument Manufacturing". At this point, Takamine consisted of five guitar makers who focused on building classical guitars.

Having his new shop located at a viewing distance of Mount Takamine mountain, Ozhone was inspired to rename the company "Takamine Musical Instruments Manufacturing Co., Ltd." in May 1962 when the small business started to show signs of growth in the local market, expanding its staff to 30.

In 1965, the company grew again its size, now to 60 employees, expanding manufacturing lines to accommodate mandolins. At the time in Japan, guitar playing and folk music were becoming increasingly popular, which prompted Takamine to focus on meeting the immediate domestic demand. The year 1968 saw the arrival of the master luthier Mass Hirade as chief developer and production manager; the innovator was responsible for massive improvements in design and manufacturing processes. Other key figures at Takamine during these years include experienced craftsman Mitsuo Furui and Mituyasu Ohno, who headed the sales team and worked on the design and product portfolio. Ohno would later serve as the company's Senior Director.

At this point, while Takamine mostly aimed to serve the domestic Japanese market, the company went through the end of a short period as an overseas builder for American builder Martin (See section below), after which the decision was made to establish itself as an independent brand in the United States, strengthening the "Takamine" brand.

In 1970, Hirade became Takamine’s president and during his 6-year tenure, worked to realize his vision of expanding the company’s audience to a wider international market. By the early 1970s, Takamine partnered with American distributor KMCMusicorp (then named Kaman Music), broadening Takamine's overseas reach. In 1977, guitarist Glenn Frey of Eagles famously used an EF400S 12-string model to record the iconic intro to the song "Hotel California", which instantly became one of the band's biggest hits. Ichiro Katayama would serve as Takamine's next president after Hirade.

Just one year later, in 1978, the company would introduce its signature Palathetic pickup, a proprietary under-saddle piece composed of six separate, fully shielded piezo transducers, one for each string, the piezos are outfitted under the bridge plate and make contact with the saddle via metal cylinders. The pickup, which is still to this day produced with essentially the same design as when it was introduced, has become a staple on its Japanese-made instruments that allowed the company to become an industry trailblazer, aiming to satisfy the need for musicians of the time to reliably amplify their acoustic guitars at arena concerts that were constantly growing in size and loudness. The first instrument officially released with the pickup was model PT-007S in 1979.

Guitarist Ry Cooder was instrumental for the development of the pickup, as he was one of the first musicians to get a hold of the earliest prototypes of the product in the early 1970's, after being invited by Mass Hirade to meet at the company headquarters in Japan. Cooder's personal steel-string guitar, handcrafted by luthier Lloyd Baggs, was analyzed and replicated by Takamine luthiers and equipped with Takamine's proprietary pickup, which continued to be developed following Cooder's personal feedback. When the guitarist returned to the United States, he presented Baggs with the acoustic guitar Takamine made based on his original work, and the company's onboard system greatly impressed him to the point of inspiring his decision to pivot his work to the field of acoustic instrument amplification. Takamine and Baggs still collaborate to this day, the brainchild of this union being the Takamine Tri-Ax 2 pickup, which is closely modeled after the L.R. Baggs M80 pickup, but made to work both as a standalone pickup and alongside Takamine's current generation of onboard pre-amplifiers.

The next decade saw the introductions of preamp technology: In 1988, the AAP preamp pioneered parametric equalization, and the DSP model -designed by Korg- included reverb effects and allowed the user to create and save presets. These products were among the first to present the "SoundChoice" feature: A modular design that could in theory allow musicians to swap between different preamp models using the same base instrument, to this day still favored by the company. In 1987, Takamine would introduce yet another staple of the company’s products, the "Limited Edition" series: A small yearly run of a few hundred crafted guitars by qualified in-house builders, these instruments are fitted with brand new electronics and one-of-a-kind decorative inlays, each year sporting a different model, color, and overall theme, with motifs often based on nature or astronomical phenomena.

While primarily known for acoustic and acoustic-electric guitars, Takamine produced a limited run of high-quality solid-body electric guitars and electric basses from 1983 to 1985. Though there is a somewhat limited amount of information about these products -compared to their acoustic counterparts-, it is known that some of these guitars had bodies that evoked the iconic shapes of Stratocaster and Explorer guitars, with some high-end models sporting DiMarzio-made pickups, Floyd Rose or Kahler tremolos, and Gotoh tuners.

In the 1990s, Takamine's position as a major force in the international musical market in the past couple of decades led to collaborations with artists like singer-songwriter Steve Wariner in 1990, country star Garth Brooks in 1995, and multi-instrumentalist John Jorgenson in 1999, resulting in Takamine’s first signature models. In 1993 the company’s factory introduced laser-guided CNC machinery that added to Takamine’s known prowess in intricate inlay work, in the next few years the Supernatural, Nashville, Tradition, and Hirade models would be introduced.

The G-Series models would soon be introduced, aiming to offer affordable instruments manufactured outside of Japan built under Takamine's rigorous quality standards bearing the brand's name, available in all different body shapes, woods, and finishes as the Japan-made instruments, featuring simpler proprietary pre-amplifiers.

Katayama, who served as Takamine's in the late 70's would return to the company's top position in 2002 after then-current president, Hiroshi Sugimura, died. The turn of the millennium saw the brand once again embracing both innovations, with the introduction of the CT ("Cool Tubes") tube-powered preamp family in 2004; and tradition, by opening a new main state-of-the-art factory and HQ in its hometown of Sakashita, where it currently resides since 2005. Signature models endorsed by Kenny Chesney, previously mentioned long-time Takamine artist Glenn Frey and Toby Keith were also introduced in 2008, 2009, and 2012, respectively.

Since March 2015, Takamine's US-North American distribution has been handled by fellow Japanese guitar company ESP Guitars, which later became responsible for Takamine's distribution in Mexico starting October 2024.

== Short-lived partnership with Martin and "Lawsuit Era" ==
In the late 60s, American guitar company Martin planned to produce cheaper guitars in Japan based on their drawings through a local provider. The search for a partnering company pointed them towards musical instrument distributor Coast Wholesale, which already had several contacts in Japan, one of them being Takamine.

Takamine was then commissioned to build a batch of steel-stringed guitars that had the same features as the Martin ones, which were sold under the name Sigma Guitars. The arrangement worked well for a time, until 1968 when Martin ended their partnership with Coast Wholesale, which was acquired by competitor company Kaman Music, which at the time owned Ovation. Kaman Music would later hold Takamine's distribution rights in the United States in excess of 40 years. The "Sigma Guitars" brand was later discontinued by Martin in 2007 and the rights to the name were acquired by German company AMI Musical Instruments, which resumed production of the brand.

In the early 1970s, soon after the partnership ended, as with many Japanese-based musical brands at the time, Takamine borrowed designs and shapes from other brands before developing its own original visual identity and catalog. In Takamine's case, they used headstock and logo designs that looked similar to ones created by established American brands such as previously mentioned Martin and Guild.

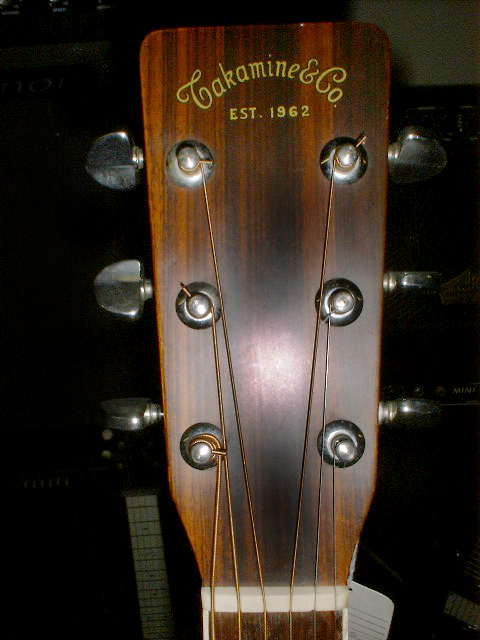
Old logo

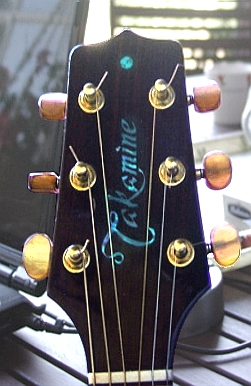
New logo

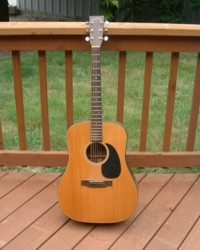
Lawsuit era 1978 Takamine F340S

Takamine’s use of Martin’s trademark headstock design led Martin to send a cease-and-desist letter. Takamine steel-string guitars with squared-off headstocks are known as “lawsuit guitars,” even though there was never any formal litigation, the term is most likely a reference to a 1977 lawsuit filed by Gibson against Ibanez for infringing on their headstock design. To distance its guitars from Martin and other American makers, Takamine modified certain details on its steel-string guitars. It borrowed a pointy headstock shape from the luthier Lloyd R. Baggs, who would become better known for his LR Baggs electronics.

== Takamine players ==
=== Signature artists ===
- Garth Brooks
- John Jorgenson
- Glenn Frey
- Kenny Chesney
- Toby Keith
- Glen Hansard
- Ariel Camacho

=== Featured artists ===
- Jon Bon Jovi
- Blake Shelton
- Steven Wilson (Porcupine Tree)
- Stephen Wilson Jr.
- Bruce Springsteen
- Raffi
- Don Henley
- Nancy Wilson (Heart)
- Hozier
- Bruno Mars
- John Scofield
- Billy Preston
- Reba Meyers (Code Orange)
- Rick Astley
- Jeff Stinco (Simple Plan)
- Howie Day
- Bruno & Marrone
- Adam Dutkiewicz (Killswitch Engage)
- Cheryl Nystrom Ball (Mercy Creek)
