= Gokuraku Station =

Railway station in Ena, Gifu Prefecture, Japan

Gokuraku Station 極楽駅
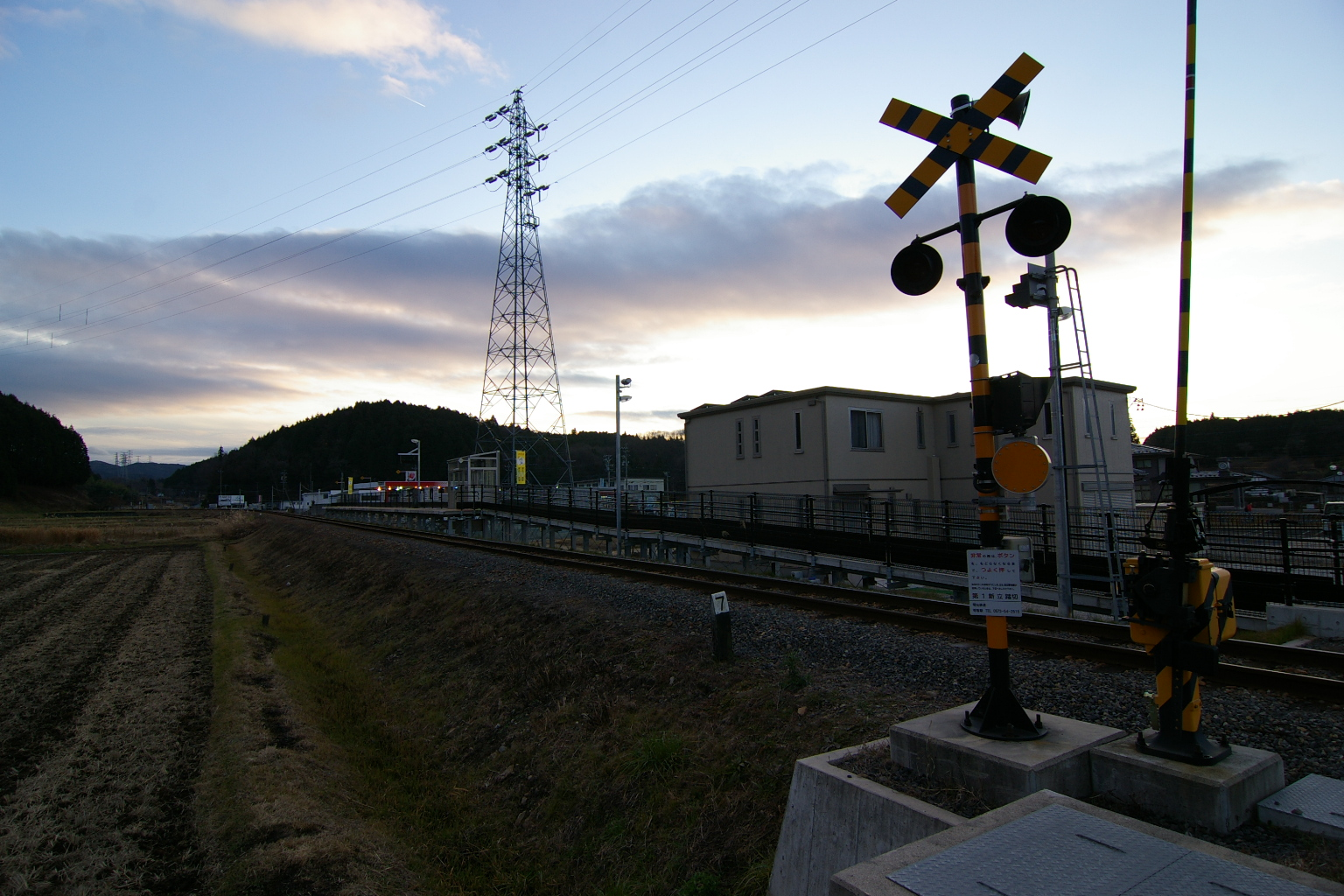
- Gokuraku Station in December 2009

General information
- Location: Iwamura-cho, Ena-shi, Gifu-ken 509-7401; Japan
- Coordinates: 35°22′47″N 137°25′57″E
- Operator: Akechi Railway
- Line: ■ Akechi Line
- Distance: 13.7 km from Ena
- Platforms: 1 side platform
- Tracks: 1

Other information
- Status: Unstaffed
- Website: Official website (in Japanese)

History
- Opened: 25 December 2008
Location
- Location within Gifu Prefecture Location within Japan

Gokuraku Station (極楽駅, Gokuraku-eki) is a train station in the city of Ena, Gifu Prefecture, Japan, operated by the third-sector railway operator Akechi Railway.

== Lines ==
Gokuraku Station is a station on the Akechi Line, and is located 13.7 rail kilometers from the terminus of the line at Ena.

== Station layout ==
Gokuraku Station has one side platform serving a single bi-directional track. The station is unattended.

== Adjacent stations ==
«	Service	»
Akechi Railway
Akechi Line
Rapid: Does not stop at this station
Iibama	Local	Iwamura
Agi	Express Taishō Roman Gō	Iwamura

== History ==
Gokuraku Station opened on 25 December 2008. The station building was renovated on 23 December 2019.

== Surrounding area ==
- National Route 257

== See also ==
- List of railway stations in Japan
