= Akechi Station (Ena) =

Railway station in Ena, Gifu Prefecture, Japan

Akechi Station 明智駅
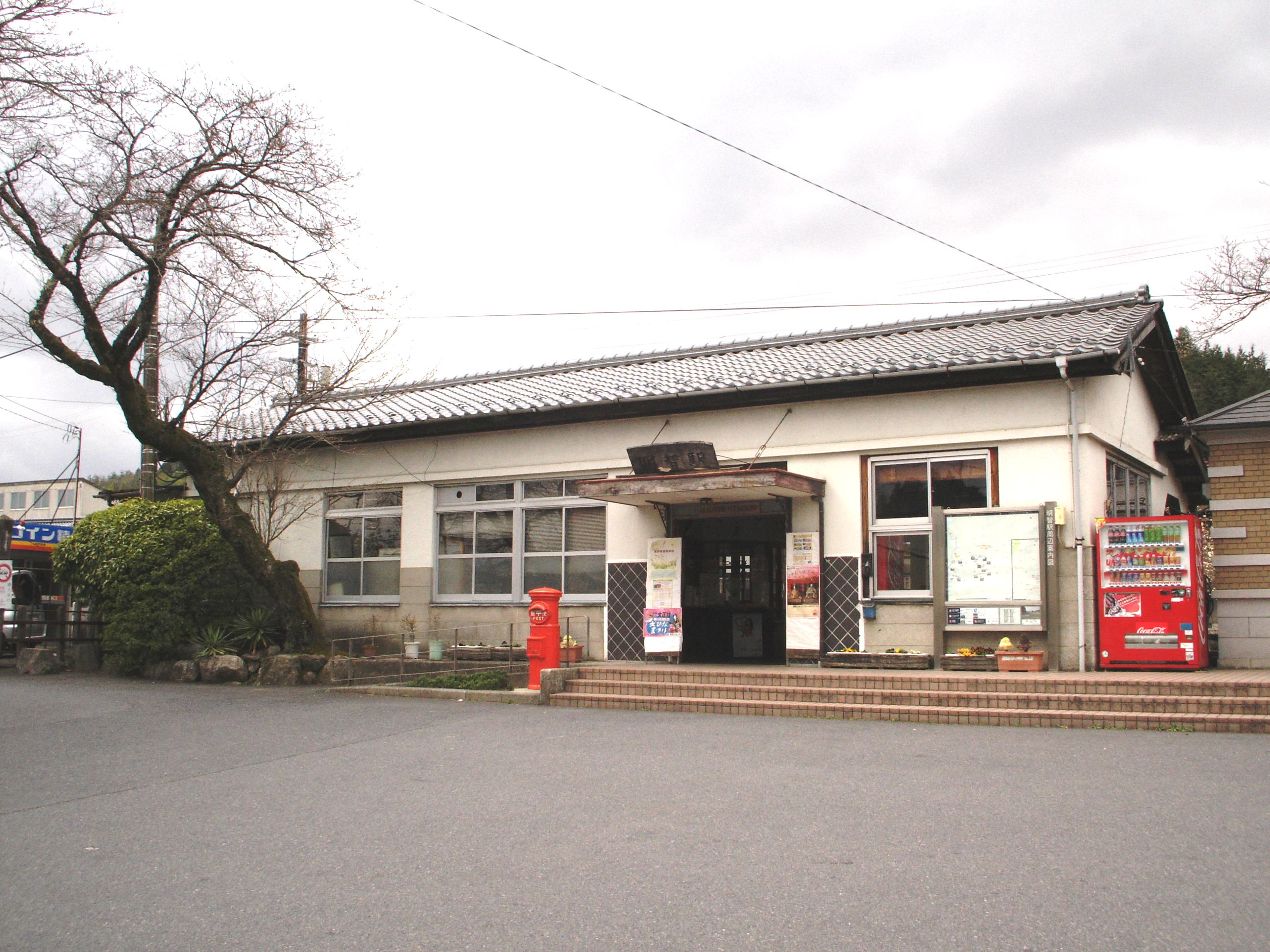
- Akechi Station in March 2007

General information
- Location: Akechi-cho, Ena, Gifu-ken 509-7731; Japan
- Coordinates: 35°18′22″N 137°23′15″E
- Operator: Akechi Railway
- Line: ■ Akechi Line
- Distance: 25.1 km from Ena
- Platforms: 1 side platform
- Tracks: 1

Other information
- Status: Staffed
- Website: Official website (in Japanese)

History
- Opened: March 20, 1956
Location
- Location within Gifu Prefecture Location within Japan

Akechi Station (明智駅, Akechi-eki) is a train station in the city of Ena, Gifu Prefecture, Japan, operated by the Third-sector railway operator Akechi Railway.

== Lines ==
Akechi Station is a terminal station on the Akechi Line, and is located 25.1 rail kilometers from the opposing terminus of the line at Ena.

== Station layout ==
Akechi Station has one ground-level side platform serving a single bi-directional track. The station is staffed.

== Adjacent stations ==
«	Service	»
Akechi Railway
Akechi Line
Noshi	Local	Terminus
Yamaoka	Rapid (up only)	Terminus
Yamaoka	Express Taishō Roman Gō	Terminus

== History ==
Akechi Station opened on June 24, 1934, as Akechi Station (明知駅). The name came from the former location of the station, Akechi. The kanji in the station name was changed to its present version on November 16, 1985.

== Surrounding area ==
- Taisho-mura
- Akechi Elementary School
- Akechi Junior High School
- Akechi castle

== See also ==
- List of railway stations in Japan
