= Higashishirakawa =

Higashishirakawa 東白川村
- Village
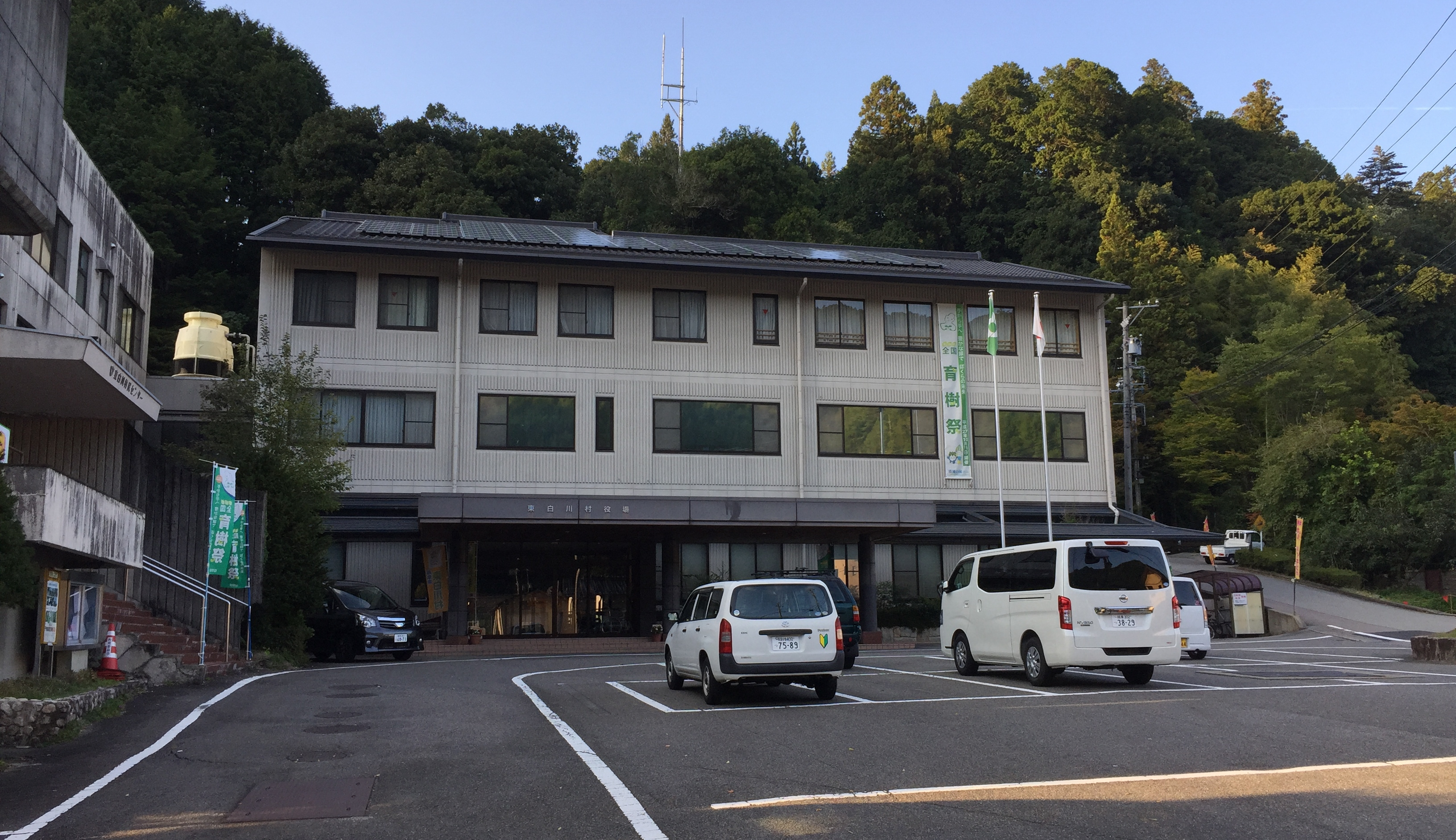
- Higashishirakawa Village Hall

- Flag Seal

- Location of Higashishirakawa in Gifu Prefecture

- Coordinates: 35°38′33.1″N 137°19′25.8″E
- Country: Japan
- Region: Chūbu
- Prefecture: Gifu
- District: Kamo

Government
  - Mayor: Yasue Shin'ichi

Area
  - Total: 87.09 km^{2} (33.63 sq mi)

Population (December 31, 2018)
  - Total: 2,278
  - Density: 26.16/km^{2} (67.75/sq mi)
- Time zone: UTC+9 (Japan Standard Time)
- City symbols
- Tree: Acer pycnanthum
- Flower: Rhododendron dilatatum
- Phone number: 0574-78-3111
- Address: Kando 548, Higashishirakawa-mura, Kamo-gun, Gifu-ken 509-1392
- Website: Official website

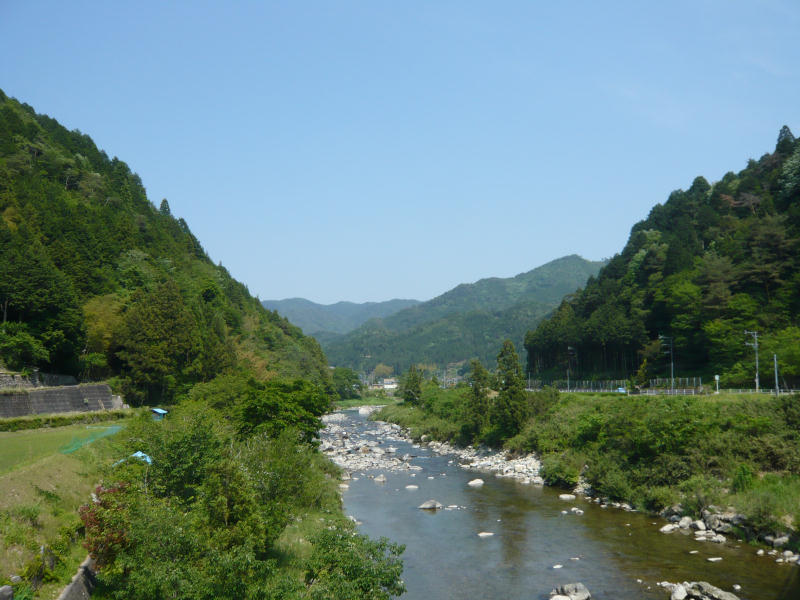
Goka area in Higshishirakawa

Higashishirakawa (東白川村, Higashishirakawa-mura) is a village located in Kamo District, Gifu Prefecture, Japan. As of 31 December 2018, the village had an estimated population of 2,278 and a population density of 26 persons per km^{2}, in 842 households. The total area of the village was 87.09 square kilometres (33.63 sq mi). Higashishirakawa has been selected as one of The Most Beautiful Villages in Japan.

== Geography ==
Higashishirakawa is located in the Mino-Mikawa Plateau of central Gifu Prefecture, surrounded by 1000-meter class mountains. Over 90% of the village area is forested. The village has a climate characterized by hot and humid summers and mild winters (Köppen climate classification Cfa). The average annual temperature in Higashishirakawa is 12.7 °C. The average annual rainfall is 2038 mm with September as the wettest month. The temperatures are highest on average in August, at around 25.4 °C, and lowest in January, at around 0.4 °C.

=== Neighbouring municipalities ===
- Gifu Prefecture
  - Nakatsugawa
  - Shirakawa

== Demographics ==
Per Japanese census data, the population of Higashishirakawa has declined steadily over the past 50 years.

Historical population
Year	Pop.	±%
1970	4,080	—
1980	3,578	−12.3%
1990	3,323	−7.1%
2000	2,980	−10.3%
2010	2,514	−15.6%
2020	2,016	−19.8%

== History ==
The area around Higashishirakawa was part of traditional Mino Province. During the Edo period, it was part of the territory controlled by Naegi Domain. During the post-Meiji restoration cadastral reforms, the area was organised into Kamo District, Gifu Prefecture. The village of Higashishirawa was formed on July 1, 1889, with the establishment of the modern municipalities system. The early Meiji period Haibutsu kishaku movement was especially strong in this area, and to this day, Higashishirakawa is the only municipality in Japan without a single Buddhist temple. Plans to merge the village with the neighbouring city of Gifu were rejected by a referendum in June 2004.

== Economy ==
The mainstay of the local economy is agriculture and forestry.

== Education ==
Higashishirakawa has one public elementary school and one public middle school operated by the village government. The village does not have a high school.

== Transportation ==
=== Railway ===
The village does not have any passenger train service.

=== Highway ===
- National Route 256
