= Toba River (Gifu) =

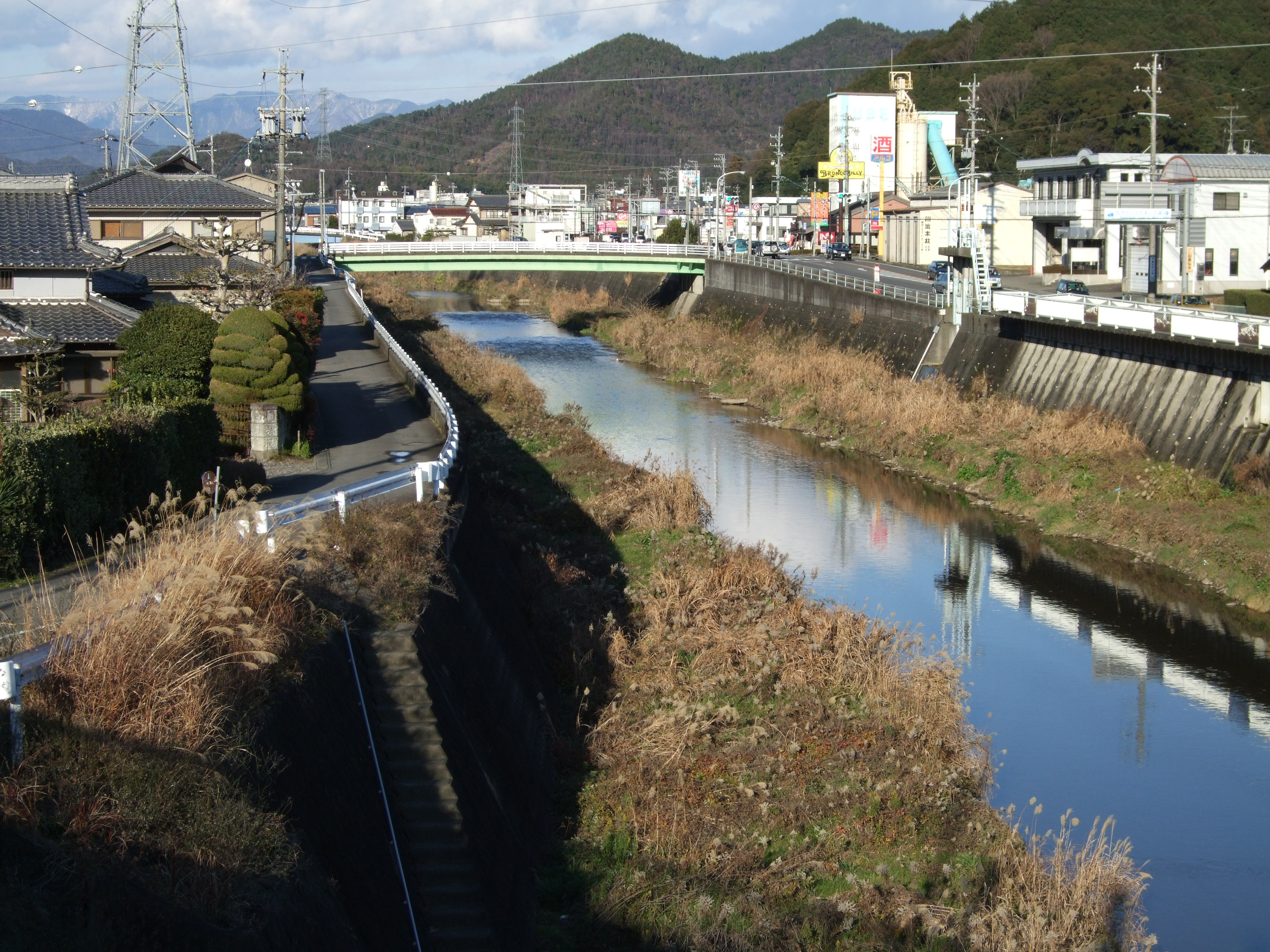
- The Toba River in Gifu

- Native name: 鳥羽川 (Japanese)

Location
- Country: Japan

Physical characteristics
- Source
  - elevation: 330 m (1,080 ft)
- Mouth
  - location: Ijira River
- Length: 16 km (9.9 mi)
- Basin size: 69 km^{2} (27 sq mi)

Basin features
- River system: Kiso River

The Toba River (鳥羽川, Toba-gawa) is a river in Japan which flows through Gifu Prefecture. It empties into the Ijira River. Locally, the name is sometimes written as 戸羽川, which has the same pronunciation.

== Geography ==
The upper part of the river between Yamagata and where the river merges with the Ijira River is prone to flooding. Flooding was particularly bad after Super Typhoon Fran in 1976. Over 10,000 buildings suffered some damage from the flood, which caused more than 38 billion yen in damage.

== River communities ==
The river passes through the cities of Yamagata and Gifu.
