= Toba River =

Toba River may refer to:

- Toba River (British Columbia), a river in British Columbia, Canada
- Toba River (Gifu), a river in Gifu Prefecture, Japan
