= Chukyo Gakuin University =

Private university in Nakatsugawa, Gifu, Japan

Coordinates: 35.4679°N 137.4893°E

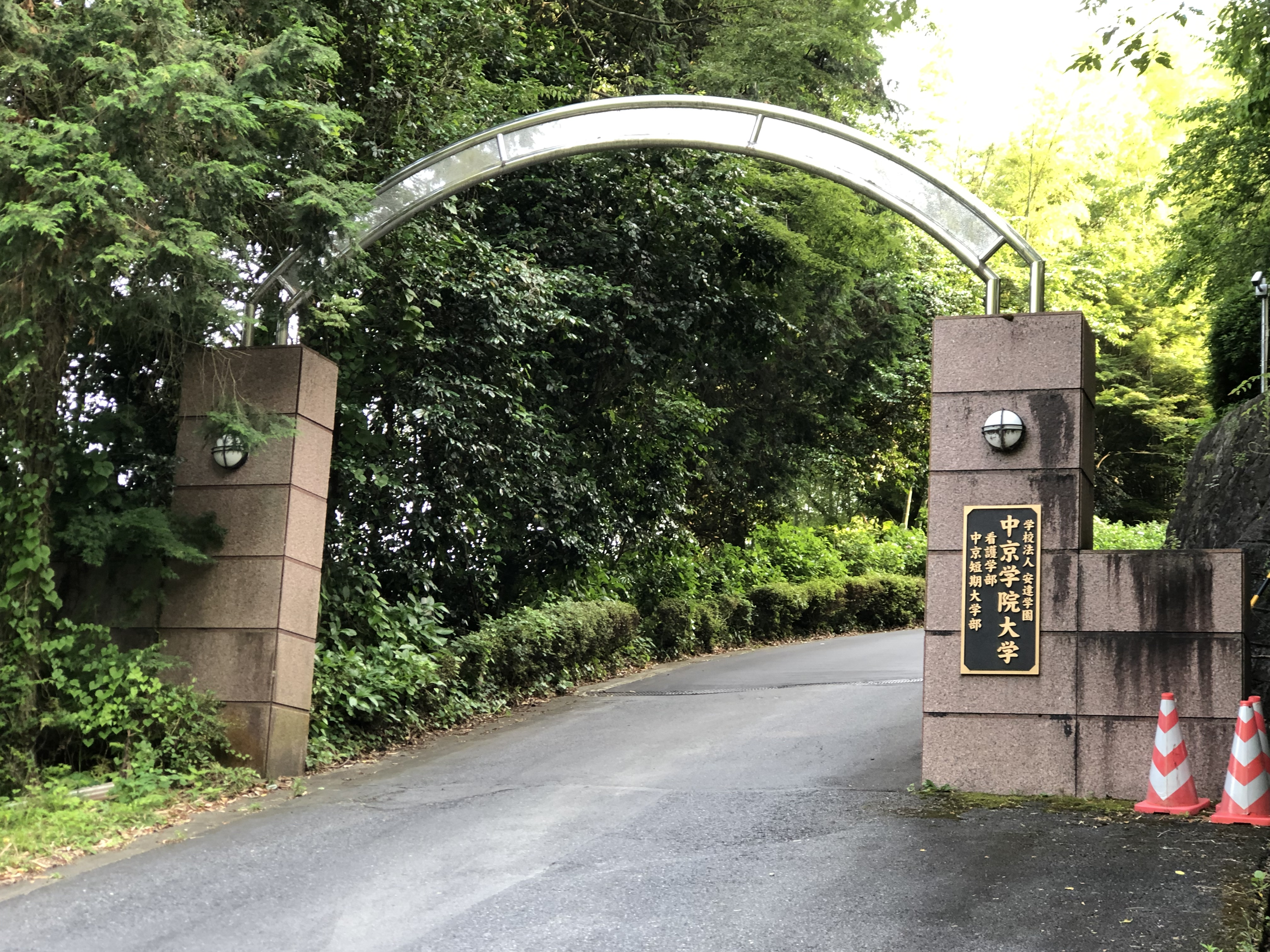
Chukyo Gakuin University Mizunami Campus

Chukyo Gakuin University (中京学院大学, Chūkyō Gakuin daigaku) is a private university at Nakatsugawa, Gifu, Japan. The school was founded as a junior college in 1966 and became a four-year college in 1993.
