= Nemichi Shrine =

Shinto shrine in Gifu Prefecture, Japan

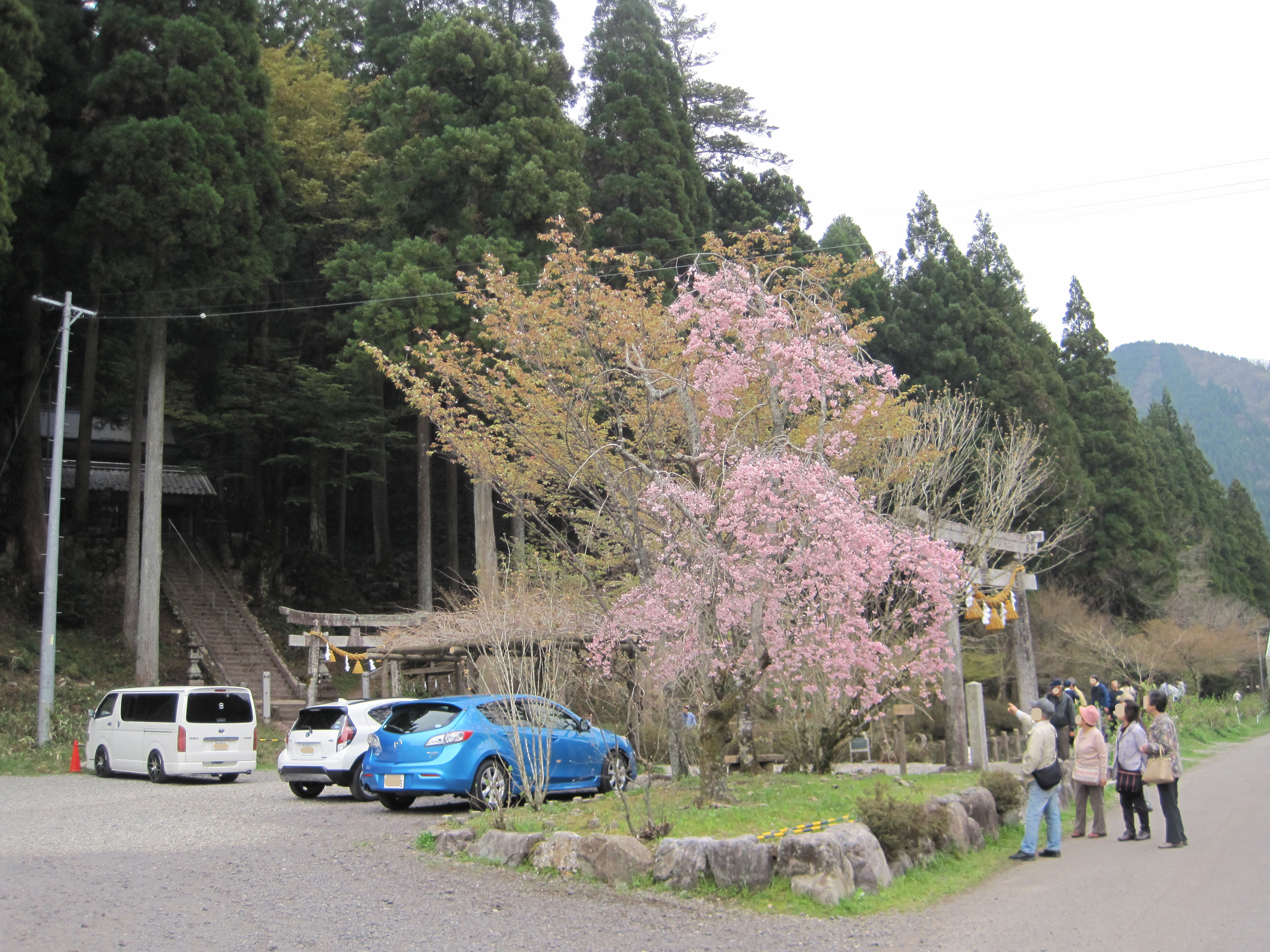
- Nemichi Shrine.

- Location within Japan

Religion
- Affiliation: Shinto

Location
- Interactive map of Nemichi Shrine
- Coordinates: 35.651944°N 136.821111°E

Nemichi Shrine (根道神社, Nemichi jinja) is a Japanese Shinto shrine located in the city of Seki, Gifu Prefecture. Nemichi Shrine has become famous for its koi pond, which has been compared to the Water Lilies paintings of Claude Monet.

The shrine claims to have been founded in the mid-9th century, but no reliable historical records exist before the early Edo period.

== Structure and koi pond ==
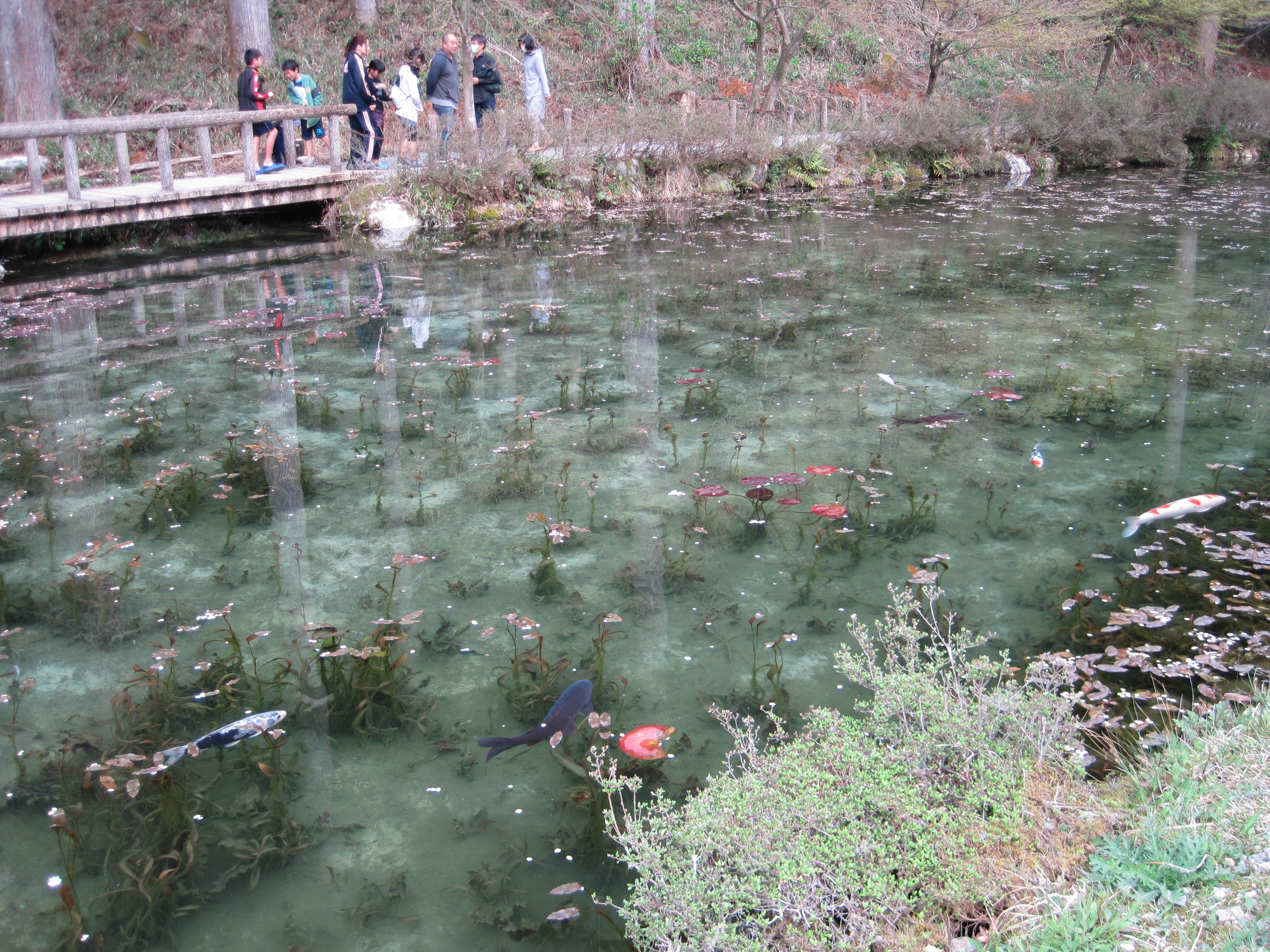
Monet's Pond. April 2016.

Nemichi Shrine itself is a single wooden building built to honor the gods and goddesses of the Shinto faith. The shrine's koi pond is technically called the "Pond with no name" (名前のない池), but is commonly known as "Monet's Pond" in reference to 19th century French impressionist painter Claude Monet, whose paintings have been noted as being similar to the visual display of the koi pond.
