= Ijira River =

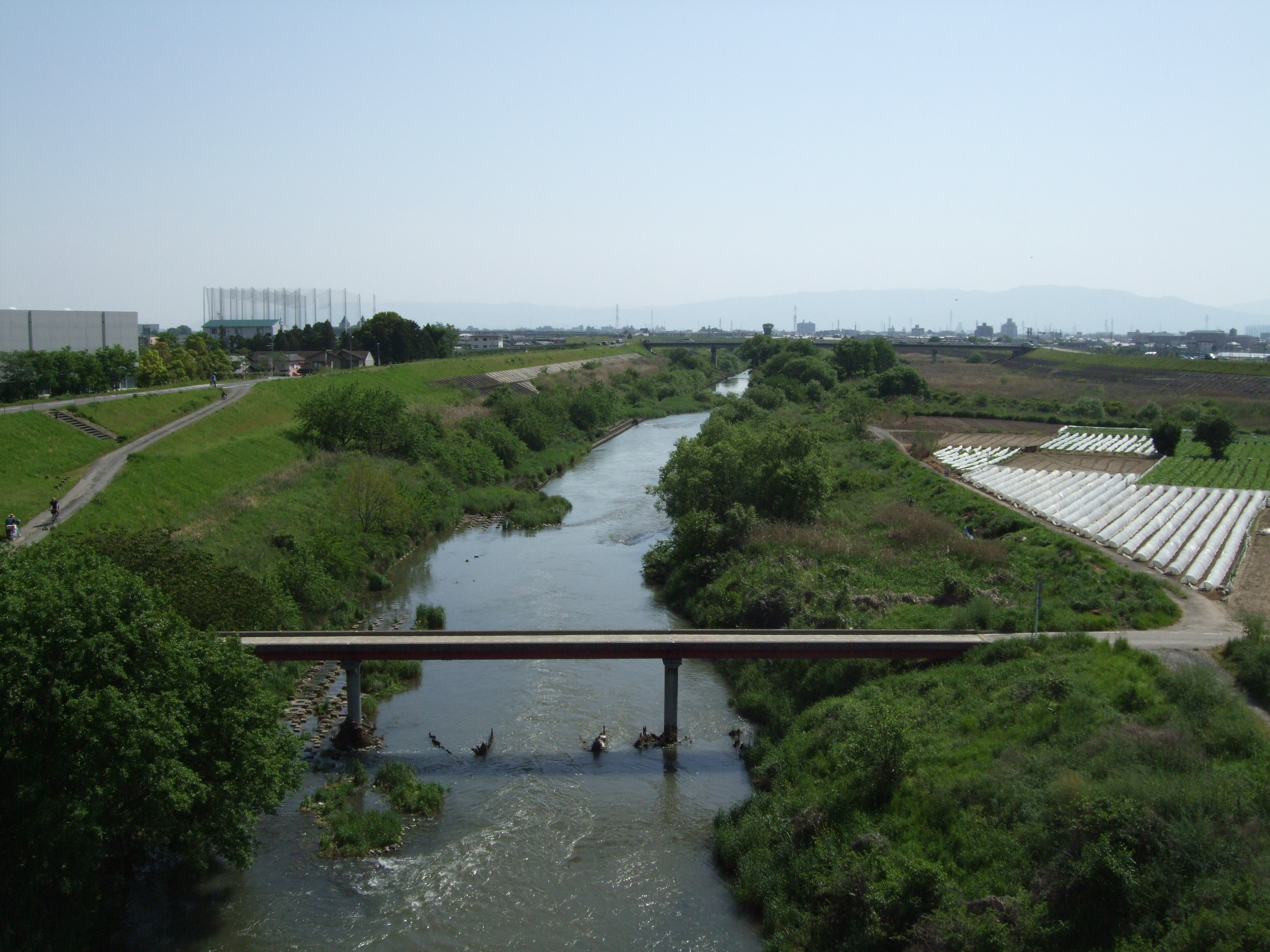
- The Ijira River in Gifu

- Native name: 伊自良川 (Japanese)

Location
- Country: Japan

Physical characteristics
- Source
  - elevation: 696 m (2,283 ft)
- Mouth: Nagara River
  - coordinates: 35°24′38″N 136°42′18″E
- Length: 22 km (14 mi)
- Basin size: 159 km^{2} (61 sq mi)

Basin features
- River system: Kiso River

The Ijira River (伊自良川, Ijira-gawa) is a river in Japan which flows through Gifu Prefecture. It empties into the Nagara River.

== River communities ==
The river passes through the cities of Yamagata and Gifu.
