= Mino-Sakamoto Station =

Railway station in Nakatsugawa, Gifu Prefecture, Japan

CF18 Mino-Sakamoto Station 美乃坂本駅
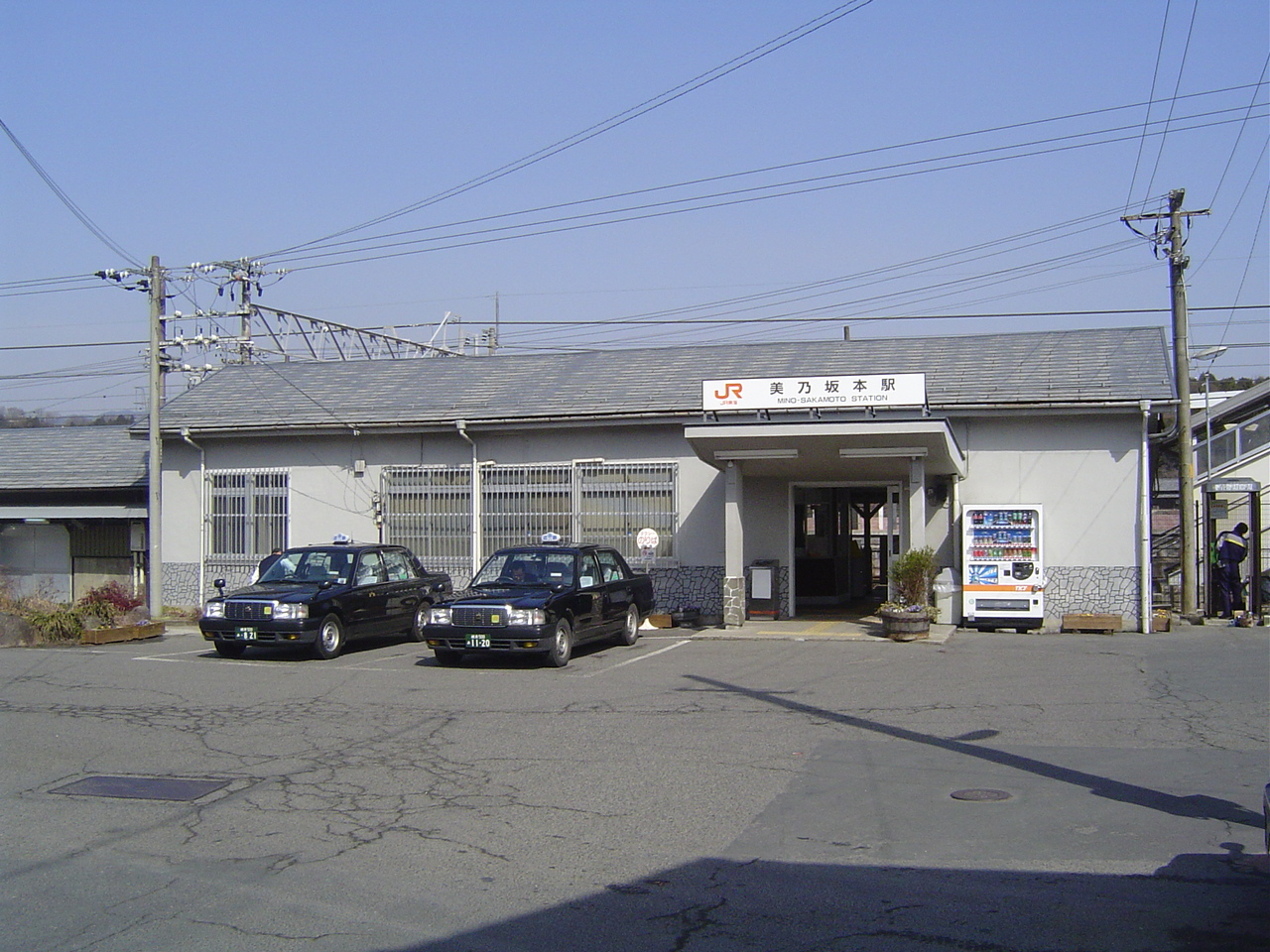
- Mino-Sakamoto Station in March 2008

General information
- Location: Sendanbayashi, Nakatsugawa-shi, Gifu-ken 509-9131; Japan
- Coordinates: 35.4794°N 137.4501°E
- Operator: JR Central
- Line: Chūō Main Line
- Distance: 323.4 km from Tokyo
- Platforms: 1 island platform
- Tracks: 2

Other information
- Status: Staffed Midori no Madoguchi)
- Station code: CF18

History
- Opened: 15 November 1917

Passengers
- FY2014: 1,350 daily
Location
- Location within Gifu Prefecture Location within Japan

Mino-Sakamoto Station (美乃坂本駅, Mino-Sakamoto-eki) is a railway station on the Chūō Main Line in the city of Nakatsugawa, Gifu Prefecture, Japan, operated by Central Japan Railway Company (JR Central).

== Lines ==
Mino-Sakamoto Station is served by the Chūō Main Line, and is located 323.4 kilometers from the official starting point of the line at Tokyo and 73.5 kilometers from Nagoya.

== Layout ==
The station has one ground-level island platform connected by a footbridge. The station has a Midori no Madoguchi staffed ticket office.

=== Platforms ===
1	■ Chūō Main Line	for Tajimi and Nagoya
3	■ Chūō Main Line	for Nakatsugawa and Nagano

== Adjacent stations ==
«	Service	»
Chūō Main Line
Limited Express Shinano: Does not stop at this station
Home Liner: Does not stop at this station
Nakatsugawa	Central Liner	Ena
Nakatsugawa	Rapid	Ena
Nakatsugawa	Local	Ena

== History ==
Mino-Sakamoto Station opened on 15 November 1917. On 1 April 1987, it became part of JR Central.

The Chuo Shinkansen Gifu Prefecture station will be built close to this station.

== Passenger statistics ==
In fiscal 2014, the station was used by an average of 1,350 passengers daily (boarding passengers only).

== Surrounding area ==
- Sakamoto Elementary School
- Sakamoto Junior High School

== See also ==
- List of railway stations in Japan
