= Akechi Line =

Railway line in Japan

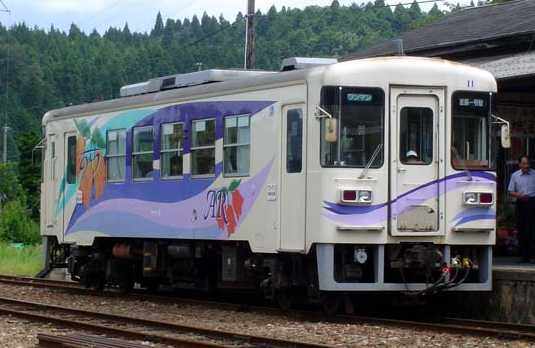
- Akechi 10 series diesel railcar 11

Overview
- Native name: 明知線
- Status: In operation
- Owner: Akechi Railway
- Locale: Gifu Prefecture
- Termini: Ena; Akechi
- Stations: 11

Service
- Operator(s): Akechi Railway
- Rolling stock: Akechi 10 series DMU

History
- Opened: 24 May 1933; 92 years ago

Technical
- Line length: 25.1 km (15.6 mi)
- Number of tracks: Entire line single tracked
- Character: Rural
- Track gauge: 1,067 mm (3 ft 6 in)
- Minimum radius: 200 m
- Electrification: None
- Operating speed: 60 km/h (37 mph)

The Akechi Line (明知線, Akechi-sen) is a Japanese railway line in Gifu Prefecture connecting Ena and Akechi stations, which are both located in Ena. There are stations located in Nakatsugawa city as well. This is the only railway line Akechi Railway (明知鉄道, Akechi Tetsudō) operates. The third-sector company took over the former Japanese National Railways line in 1985.

== History ==
The line opened on 24 May 1933, between Oi Station (present-day Ena Station) and Agi. It was extended to Iwamura on 26 January 1934 and to Akechi on 24 June of the same year. Iibama Station was opened on 10 January 1959. Hanashiro Station was opened on 15 November 1967. Freight services were discontinued from 1 February 1981. The line was one of the Deficit 83 Lines selected by the Japanese National Railways for closure in 1968, although the line was not closed due to the movement ending without making much progress. However, it was brought up for closure again in 1981 during the Specified local lines movement, where it was transferred to a third-sector company in 1985. Iinuma Station opened on 28 October 1991. Noshi Station opened on 15 December 1994. Gokuraku Station opened on 25 December 2008. Hanashiro Station was renamed to Hanashiroonsen Station on 12 March 2011.

== Services ==
=== Special services ===
Akechi Railway allows riders to experience local cuisine from the region throughout different times of the year by running one round-trip service per day with a dining car, featuring dishes made from ingredients such as kanten, jinenjo, and mushrooms. Sake tasting trains also operate.

The company holds monthly events where kids and adults can experience driving a diesel locomotive. Steam locomotives also operate on the line, and private trains may be chartered for special events.

== Stations ==
All stations are located in Gifu Prefecture.

- Stations marked "▲" are stopped by the Inbound Rapid service, which runs only on weekdays).
- Stations marked "●" are stopped by Express service Taishō Roman Gō (大正ロマン号), which runs on all days excluding Mondays. An express fare is not required, but advance reservations and tickets are required to ride in the seasonal Dining Car.

No.	Image	Station	Japanese	Distance (km)	Rapid	Express Taishō Roman Gō	Transfers	Location
11		Ena	恵那	0.0	▲	●	Chūō Main Line	Ena
10		Higashino	東野	2.6	▲	｜		Ena
9		Iinuma	飯沼	7.6	↑	｜		Nakatsugawa
8		Agi	阿木	9.9	▲	●		Nakatsugawa
7		Iibama	飯羽間	12.7	▲	｜		Ena
6		Gokuraku	極楽	13.7	↑	●		Ena
5		Iwamura	岩村	15.0	▲	●		Ena
4		Hanashiro-onsen	花白温泉	18.3	▲	●		Ena
3		Yamaoka	山岡	19.7	▲	●		Ena
2		Noshi	野志	23.1	↑	｜		Ena
1		Akechi	明智	25.1	▲	●		Ena

=== Ridership ===
No.	Station	Passengers
11	Ena	594
10	Higashino	28
9	Iinuma	16
8	Agi	262
7	Iibama	28
6	Gokuraku	55
5	Iwamura	157
4	Hanashiroonsen	19
3	Yamaoka	94
2	Noshi	6
1	Akechi	242

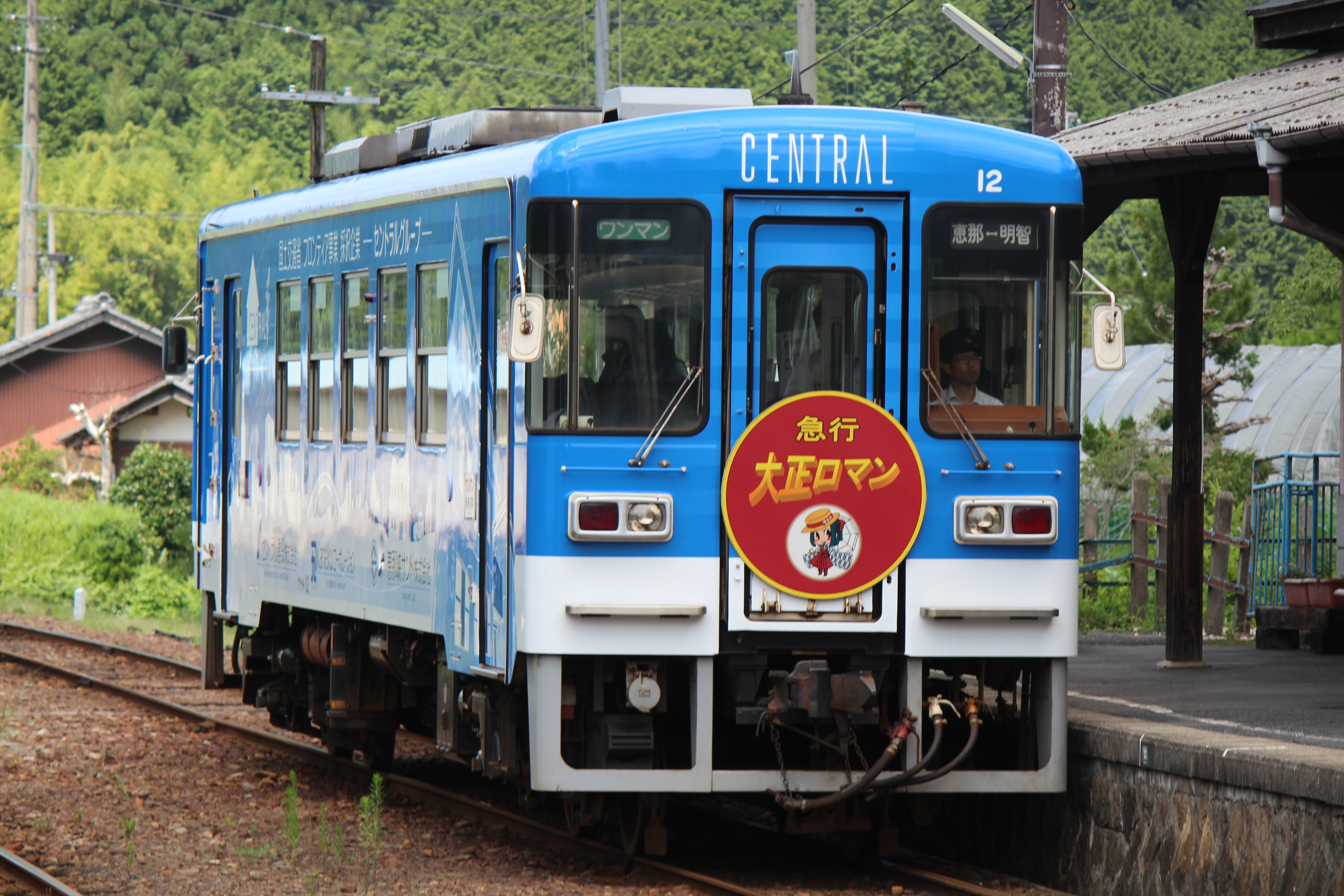
Express Taisho Roman

== Rolling stock ==
As of 1 April 2016, the line is operated using a fleet of five Akechi 10 series diesel railcars and one Akechi 6 series diesel railcar.

A new Akechi 100 series diesel railcar (number 101) entered service on 8 April 2017, replacing the former Akechi 6 series car.

== See also ==
- List of railway companies in Japan
- List of railway lines in Japan
