= Kazuo Nagano =

Japanese fraudster

- 永野一男
- Born: August 1, 1952; Ena, Gifu Prefecture, Japan
- Died: June 18, 1985 (aged 32); Osaka, Japan
- Cause of death: Stabbed by bayonet
- Occupation: Businessman

Japanese name
- Kanji: 永野 一男
- Hiragana: ながの かずお
- Katakana: ナガノ カズオ
Transcriptions
- Romanization: Nagano Kazuo

Kazuo Nagano (永野 一男, Nagano Kazuo; August 1, 1952 – June 18, 1985) was a Japanese fraudster. He was chairman of Toyota Shoji (unrelated to the car manufacturing company), a fraudulent gold investment company, which was responsible for swindling 3,855 people, mostly elderly, out of 12 billion yen.

== Early life ==
Nagano was born in Ena City, Gifu Prefecture. When he was 15 years old, he moved to his uncle's house in Hamada City, and graduated from a local junior high school. Nagano joined the mercantile company Okachi where he had high sales results, but he was dismissed when it was discovered that he profited by illegally investing the customer's money into the red bean market. After that, he changed his profession a number of times before founding Toyota Shoji, whose name was deliberately chosen to evoke the prestige of Toyota cars.

== Fraud ==
Toyota Shoji gained notoriety for its around-the-clock television commercials, which featured flashy imagery of luxury items and beautiful women while remaining vague as to the actual purpose of the enterprise, allegedly a precious metals investing company which sold certificates of ownership for (nonexistent) gold bullion. The company faced multiple complaints filed with the National Consumer Affairs Center of Japan, and were charged with fraud.

== Assassination ==
In 1985, two men – Masakazu Yano and Atsuo Iida – entered Nagano's house in Osaka through the window while at least 40 reporters watched, proceeding to stab him to death with a bayonet. One of the murderers received an 8-year jail sentence while the other received a 10-year sentence. The killers claimed to be hired assassins working on behalf of jilted former investors.
