= Horado, Gifu =

Dissolved municipality in Gifu prefecture, Japan

Map of Horado, Gifu

Horado (洞戸村, Horado-mura) was a village located in Mugi District, Gifu Prefecture, Japan.

As of 2003, the village had an estimated population of 2,250 and a density of 56.14 persons per km^{2}. The total area was 40.08 km^{2}.

On February 7, 2005, Horado, along with the towns of Mugegawa and Mugi, and the villages of Itadori and Kaminoho (all from Mugi District), was merged into the expanded city of Seki.
