= Seki, Gifu =

Seki 関市
- City
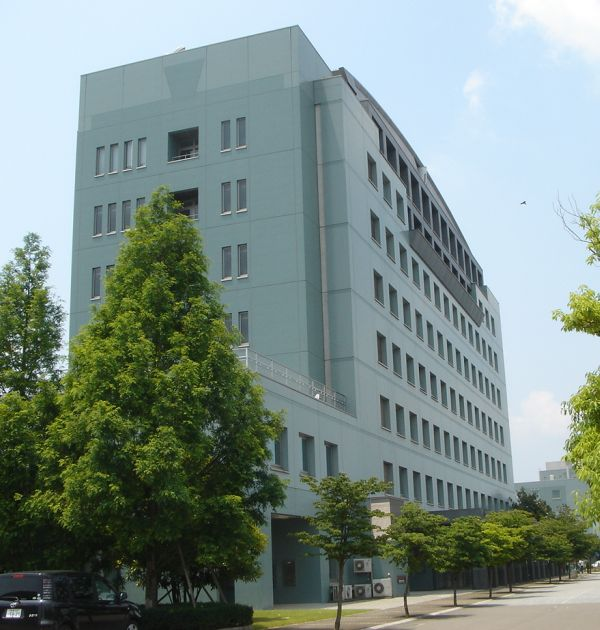
- Seki City Hall

- Flag Seal

- Location of Seki in Gifu Prefecture

- Coordinates: 35°29′44.8″N 136°55′4.7″E
- Country: Japan
- Region: Chūbu
- Prefecture: Gifu
- Town settled: July 1, 1889
- City settled: October 15, 1950

Government
  - Mayor: Kiyoshi Yamashita (山下清司)- from September 2023

Area
  - Total: 472.33 km^{2} (182.37 sq mi)

Population (January 1, 2019)
  - Total: 89,020
  - Density: 188.5/km^{2} (488.1/sq mi)
- Time zone: UTC+9 (Japan Standard Time)
- City symbols
- Tree: Japanese cedar
- Flower: Chrysanthemum
- Bird: Common kingfisher
- Fish: Sweetfish
- Phone number: 0575-22-3131
- Address: 3-1 Wakakusa-dōri, Seki-shi, Gifu-ken 501-3894
- Website: Official website

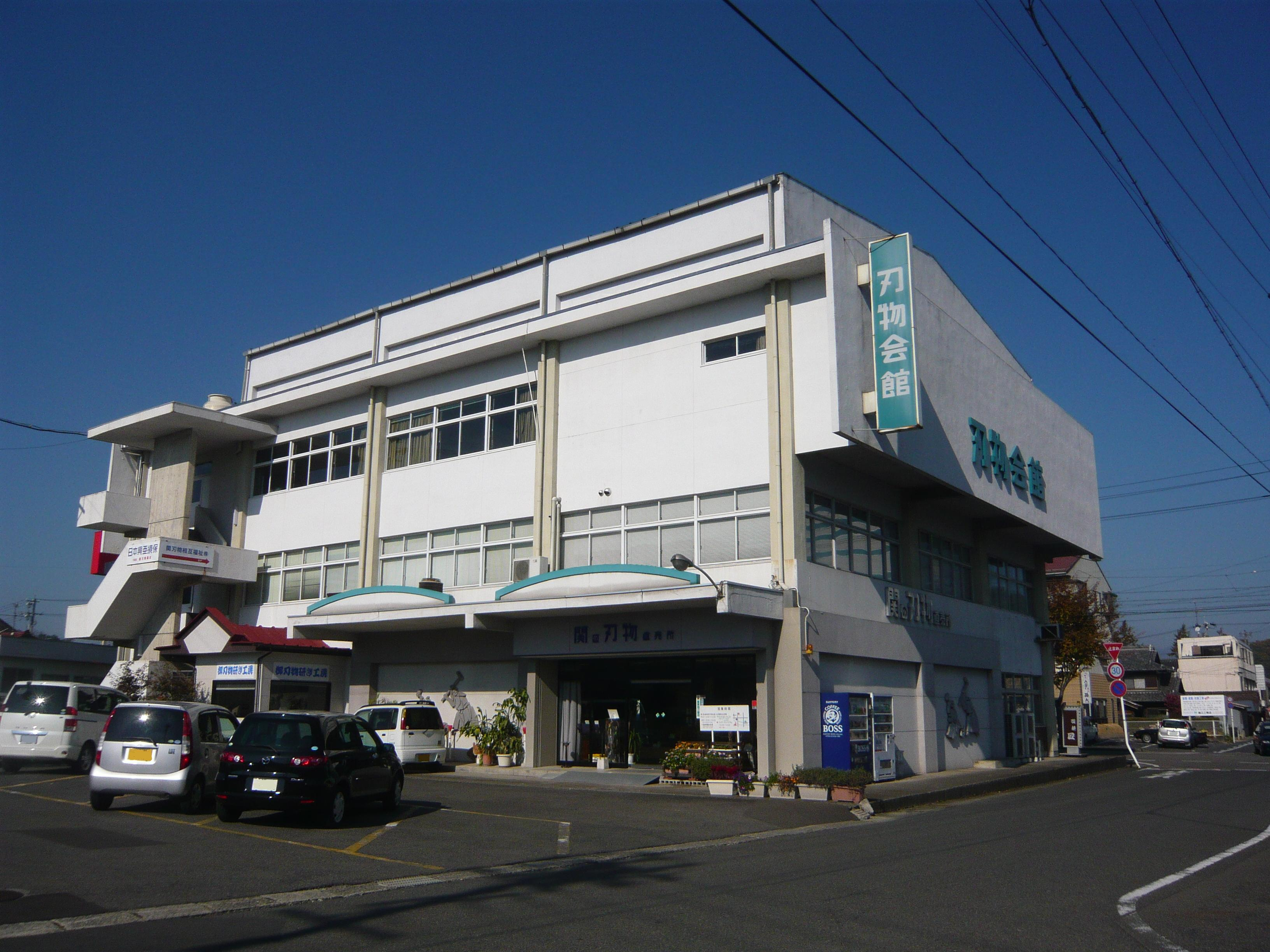
Gifu Cutlery Museum

Seki (関市, Seki-shi) is a city located in Gifu, Japan. As of 1 January 2019, the city had an estimated population of 89,020 and a population density of 190 persons per km^{2} in 35,366 households. The total area of the city was 472.33 square kilometres (182.37 sq mi).

== Geography ==
Seki is located in central Gifu Prefecture at the northern tip of the Nōbi Plain, approximately 40 kilometers north of Nagoya. Due to various municipal mergers, the city has a "U" shape, almost enclosing the city of Mino. Also as a result of the merger, the population center of population in Japan now is located in Sekiuchi (former Mutsumi-cho area). Mount Takinami is the highest point in the city, with an elevation of 1,412 metres (4,633 ft). The Nagara River and Itadori River flow through the city.

=== Climate ===
The city has a climate characterized by hot and humid summers, and mild winters (Köppen climate classification Cfa). The average annual temperature in Seki is 15.2 °C. The average annual rainfall is 2090 mm with September as the wettest month. The temperatures are highest on average in August, at around 27.8 °C, and lowest in January, at around 3.4 °C.

=== Neighbouring municipalities ===
- Fukui Prefecture
  - Ōno
- Gifu Prefecture
  - Gero
  - Gifu
  - Gujo
  - Hichisō
  - Kakamigahara
  - Mino
  - Minokamo
  - Motosu
  - Sakahogi
  - Tomika
  - Yamagata

== Demographics ==
Per Japanese census data, the population of Seki peaked around the year 2000 and has declined since.

Historical population
Year	Pop.	±%
1970	69,201	—
1980	78,529	+13.5%
1990	87,117	+10.9%
2000	92,061	+5.7%
2010	91,418	−0.7%
2020	85,283	−6.7%

== History ==
The area around Seki was part of traditional Mino Province. In the post-Meiji restoration cadastral reforms, Mugi District in Gifu prefecture was created, and the town of Seki was established on July 1, 1889, with the establishment of the modern municipalities system. Seki was elevated to city status on October 15, 1950. On February 7, 2005, the towns of Mugegawa and Mugi, and the villages of Horado, Itadori and Kaminoho (all from Mugi District) were merged into Seki.).

== Government ==
Seki has a mayor-council form of government with a directly elected mayor and a unicameral city legislature of 23 members.

== Economy ==
Seki is today considered the home of modern Japanese kitchen cutlery. The major cutlery making companies are based in Seki, and they produce kitchen knives in the traditional Japanese style and the western style, like the gyuto and the santoku. Knives and swords are so much a part of the city that it is home of the Seki Cutlery Association, the Seki Swordsmith Museum, the Seki Outdoor Knife Show, the October Cutlery Festival, and the Cutlery Hall where tourists can purchase knives.

== Education ==
=== Universities and colleges ===
- Chubu Gakuin University
- Chubu Gakuin College
- Gifu University of Medical Science

=== Primary and secondary education ===
Seki has 19 public elementary schools and nine public middle schools operated by the city government. The city has two public high schools operated by the Gifu Prefectural Board of Education, and one by the city government.

== Transportation ==
=== Railway ===
- Nagaragawa Railway Etsumi-Nan Line
  - Seki-Tomioka - Sekiguchi - Sekiterasumae - Seki - Seki-Shiyakusho-mae - Seki-Shimouchi

=== Highway ===
- Tōkai-Hokuriku Expressway
- Tōkai-Kanjō Expressway
- National Route 156
- National Route 248
- National Route 256
- National Route 418

== Sister cities ==
- Huangshi, Hubei, China, friendship city since 1997
- Mogi das Cruzes, São Paulo, Brazil, since 1999

== Local attractions ==
- Nemichi Shire is a Shinto shrine located in Seki.

== Notable people from Seki ==
- Enkū (円空) (1632–1695) was a Buddhist monk, poet and sculptor during the early Edo period. He was born in Mino, traveled extensively and died in Seki and is celebrated at the Enkū Museum.
- Kinju (金重) - a famous swordsmith. He is also known as Kaneshige using the Japanese pronunciation of his name. He and Kaneuji are founders of the Mino style. Considered to be one of the Juttetsu or "Ten Famous Students" or "10 Great Disciples of Masamune". Moving to Mino Province (today part of Gifu Prefecture) around the time of Ryakuo (1338–1342) creating the Seki tradition.
