= Kushihara, Gifu =

Dissolved municipality in Gifu prefecture, Japan

Map of Kushihara, Gifu

Kushihara (串原村, Kushihara-mura) was a village located in Ena District, Gifu Prefecture, Japan.

As of 2003, the village had an estimated population of 976 and a density of 25.54 persons per km^{2}. The total area was 38.22 km^{2}.

On October 25, 2004, Kushihara, along with the towns of Akechi, Iwamura, Kamiyahagi and Yamaoka (all from Ena District), was merged into the expanded city of Ena, and no longer exists as an independent municipality.

The local wasps were eaten as a delicacy in the period when the village was not yet a part of Ena City. This continued into 2020.
