= Ena Station =

Railway station in Ena, Gifu Prefecture, Japan

CF17 Ena Station 恵那駅
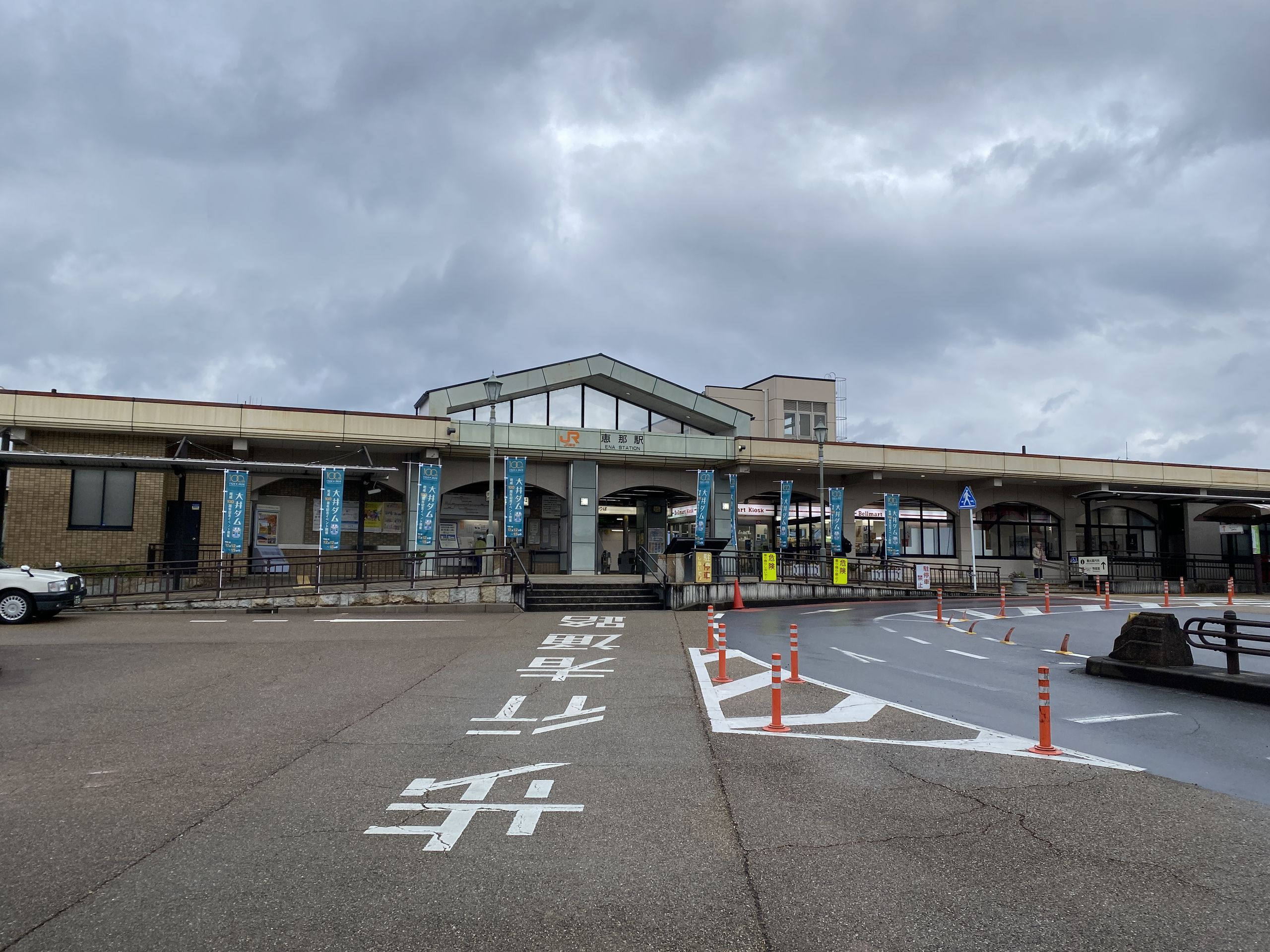
- Ena Station in 2025

General information
- Location: Ōi-machi, Ena-shi, Gifu-ken 509-7201; Japan
- Coordinates: 35.45509°N 137.4081516°E
- Operator: JR Central; Akechi Railway
- Lines: Chūō Main Line; ■ Akechi Line
- Distance: 346.8 km from Tokyo
- Platforms: 1 side + 1 island + 1 bay platform
- Tracks: 4

Other information
- Status: Staffed Midori no Madoguchi)
- Station code: CF17
- Website: Official website

History
- Opened: 21 December 1902; 123 years ago
- Former names: Ōi Station (to 1963)

Passengers
- FY2016: 3,497 daily (JR)
Location
- Location within Gifu Prefecture Location within Japan

Ena Station (恵那駅, Ena-eki) is a railway station in the city of Ena, Gifu Prefecture, Japan, operated by Central Japan Railway Company (JR Central) and by the third-sector railway operator Akechi Railway.

== Lines ==
Ena Station is served by the Chūō Main Line, and is located 328.6 kilometers from the official starting point of the line at Tokyo and 68.3 kilometers from Nagoya. It is also a terminal station for the Akechi Line, and is located 25.1 kilometers from the opposing terminus of the line at Akechi.

== Layout ==
The JR portion of the station has one ground-level side platform and one ground-level island platform connected by a footbridge. The station has a Midori no Madoguchi staffed ticket office. The Akechi Railway portion of the station has a single bay platform serving one track.

=== Platforms ===
1, 2	■ Chūō Main Line	for Tajimi and Nagoya
3	■ Chūō Main Line	for Nakatsugawa and Nagano

unnumbered	■ Akechi Railway Akechi Line	for Akechi

== Adjacent stations ==
«	Service	»
Chūō Main Line
Tajimi	Limited Express Shinano	Nakatsugawa
Mizunami	Home Liner	Nakatsugawa
Takenami	Central Liner	Mino-Sakamoto
Takenami	Rapid	Mino-Sakamoto
Takenami	Local	Mino-Sakamoto
Akechi Line
Terminus	Local	Higashino
Terminus	Rapid (up only)	Higashino
Terminus	Express Taishō Roman Gō	Agi

== History ==
The station opened on 21 December 1902 as Ōi Station (大井駅). The Akechi Line began operations from 24 May 1933. The station was renamed Ena Station from 1 November 1963. On 1 April 1987, it became part of JR Central.

== Passenger statistics ==
In fiscal 2016, the station was used by an average of 3,497 passengers daily (boarding passengers only).

== Surrounding area ==
- Ena City Hall
- Site of Ōi-juku

== Bus routes ==
- Totetsu Bus
  - For Ena Gorge
  - For Totetsu Ena Shako (You are able to transfer onto Kita-Ena Kotsu bound to Mino-Sakamoto Station and Nakatsugawa Station at this bus stop)

== See also ==
- List of railway stations in Japan
