= Mugegawa, Gifu =

Dissolved municipality in Gifu prefecture, Japan

Map of Mugegawa, Gifu

Mugegawa (武芸川町, Mugegawa-chō) was a town located in Mugi District, Gifu Prefecture, Japan.

As of 2003, the town had an estimated population of 6,621 and a density of 233.87 persons per km^{2}. The total area was 28.31 km^{2}.

On February 7, 2005, Mugegawa, along with the town of Mugi, and the villages of Horado, Itadori and Kaminoho (all from Mugi District), was merged into the expanded city of Seki.
