= Yamagata District, Gifu =

Former district in Gifu prefecture, Japan

Yamagata (山県郡, Yamagata-gun) was a district located in Gifu, Japan. On April 1, 2003 both towns and the village from the district merged, effectively turning the district into the city of Yamagata.

As of 2000, the district had an estimated population of 30,951 and a density of 139.4 persons per km^{2}. The total area was 222 km^{2}.

== Former towns and villages ==
The towns and village formerly in the district, before merging into the city of Yamagata, were:

- Ijira
- Miyama
- Takatomi
