= Tsukechi, Gifu =

Dissolved municipality in Gifu prefecture, Japan

Map of Tsukechi, Gifu

Tsukechi (付知町, Tsukechi-chō) was a town located in Ena District, Gifu Prefecture, Japan.

As of 2003, the town had an estimated population of 6,719 and a density of 91.59 persons per km^{2}. The total area was 73.36 km^{2}.

On February 13, 2005, Tsukechi, along with the towns of Fukuoka and Sakashita, the villages of Hirukawa, Kashimo and Kawaue (all from Ena District), and the village of Yamaguchi (from Kiso District, Nagano Prefecture), was merged into the expanded city of Nakatsugawa and no longer exists as an independent municipality.
