= Iwamura, Gifu =

Dissolved municipality in Gifu prefecture, Japan

Map of Iwamura, Gifu

Iwamura (岩村町, Iwamura-chō) was a town located in Ena District, Gifu Prefecture, Japan.

As of 2003, the town had an estimated population of 5,372 and a population density of 156.34 persons per km^{2}. The total area was 34.36 km^{2}.

On October 25, 2004, Iwamura, along with the towns of Akechi, Kamiyahagi and Yamaoka, and the village of Kushihara (all from Ena District), was merged into the expanded city of Ena, and no longer exists as an independent municipality.

Iwamura Castle is located in Iwamura.
