= Yamaoka, Gifu =

Dissolved municipality in Gifu prefecture, Japan

Location of Yamaoka in Gifu Prefecture

Yamaoka (山岡町, Yamaoka-chō) was a town located in Ena District, Gifu Prefecture, Japan.

As of 2003, the town had an estimated population of 5,381 and a density of 88.27 persons per km^{2}. The total area was 60.96 km^{2}.

On October 25, 2004, Yamaoka, along with the towns of Akechi, Iwamura and Kamiyahagi, and the village of Kushihara (all from Ena District), was merged into the expanded city of Ena, and no longer exists as an independent municipality.
