= Itadori, Gifu =

Dissolved municipality in Gifu prefecture, Japan

Map of Itadori, Gifu

Itadori (板取村, Itadori-mura) was a village located in Mugi District, Gifu Prefecture, Japan.

As of 2003, the village had an estimated population of 1,808 and a density of 9.65 persons per km^{2}. The total area was 187.35 km^{2}.

On February 7, 2005, Itadori, along with the towns of Mugegawa and Mugi, and the villages of Horado and Kaminoho (all from Mugi District), was merged into the expanded city of Seki.

Since 1992, the village is organizing the final round of the Biketrial World Championship with very great success. Around more than 200 riders are riding every year and the village is known around the world because this event.
