= Nakatsugawa =

Nakatsugawa 中津川市
- City
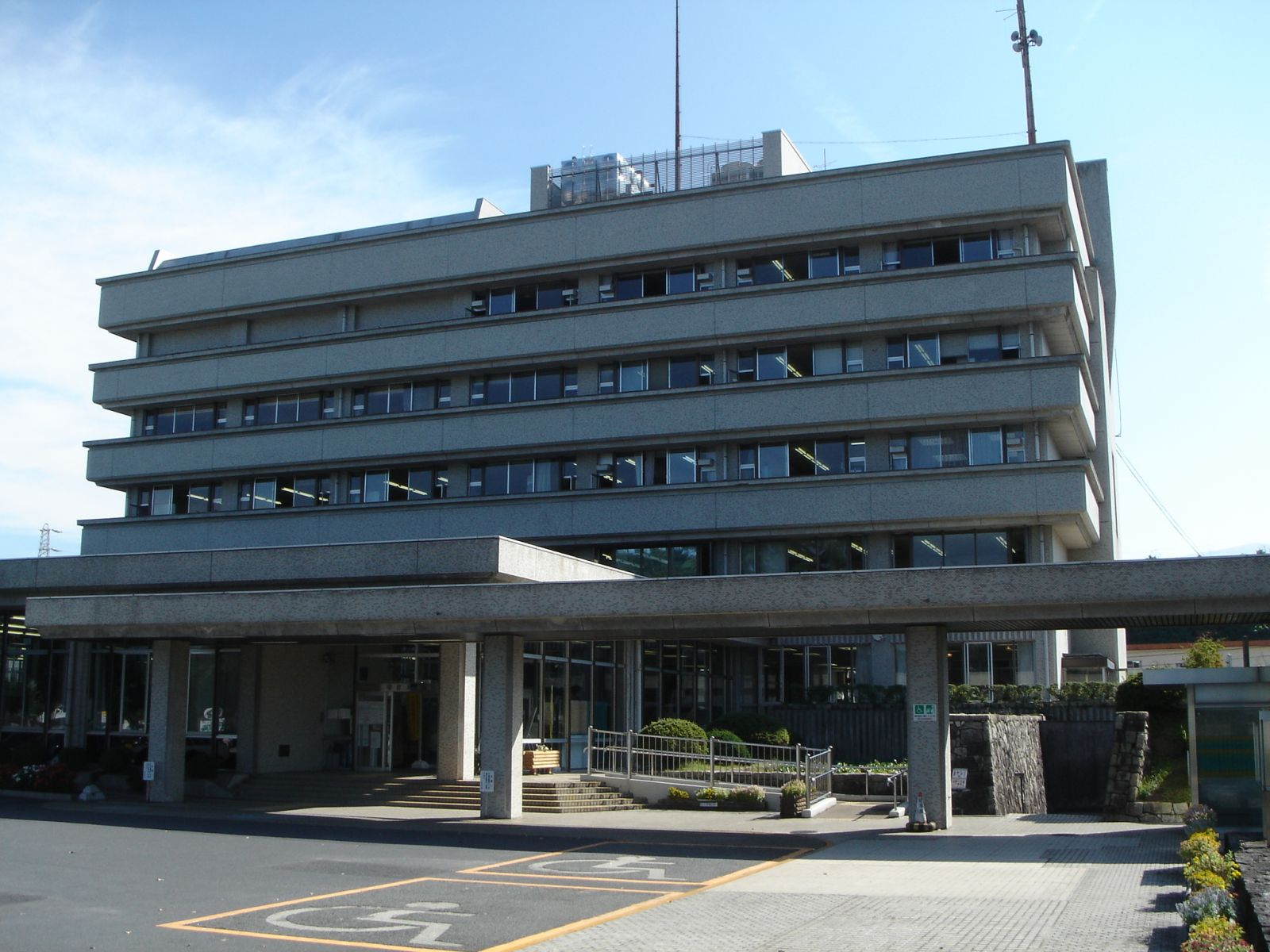
- Nakatsugawa City Hall

- Flag Seal

- Location of Nakatsugawa in Gifu Prefecture

- Coordinates: 35°29′15.3″N 137°30′2.1″E
- Country: Japan
- Region: Chūbu
- Prefecture: Gifu

Government
  - Mayor: Setsuji Aoyama (since January 2012)

Area
  - Total: 676.45 km^{2} (261.18 sq mi)

Population (December 31, 2018)
  - Total: 78,930
  - Density: 116.7/km^{2} (302.2/sq mi)
- Time zone: UTC+9 (Japan Standard Time)
- Phone number: 0573-66-1111
- Address: Kayanoki-chō 2-1, Nakatsugawa-shi, Gifu-ken 508-8501
- Climate: Cfa
- Website: Official website
- Symbols
- Flower: Enkianthus campanulatus
- Tree: Sciadopitys verticillata

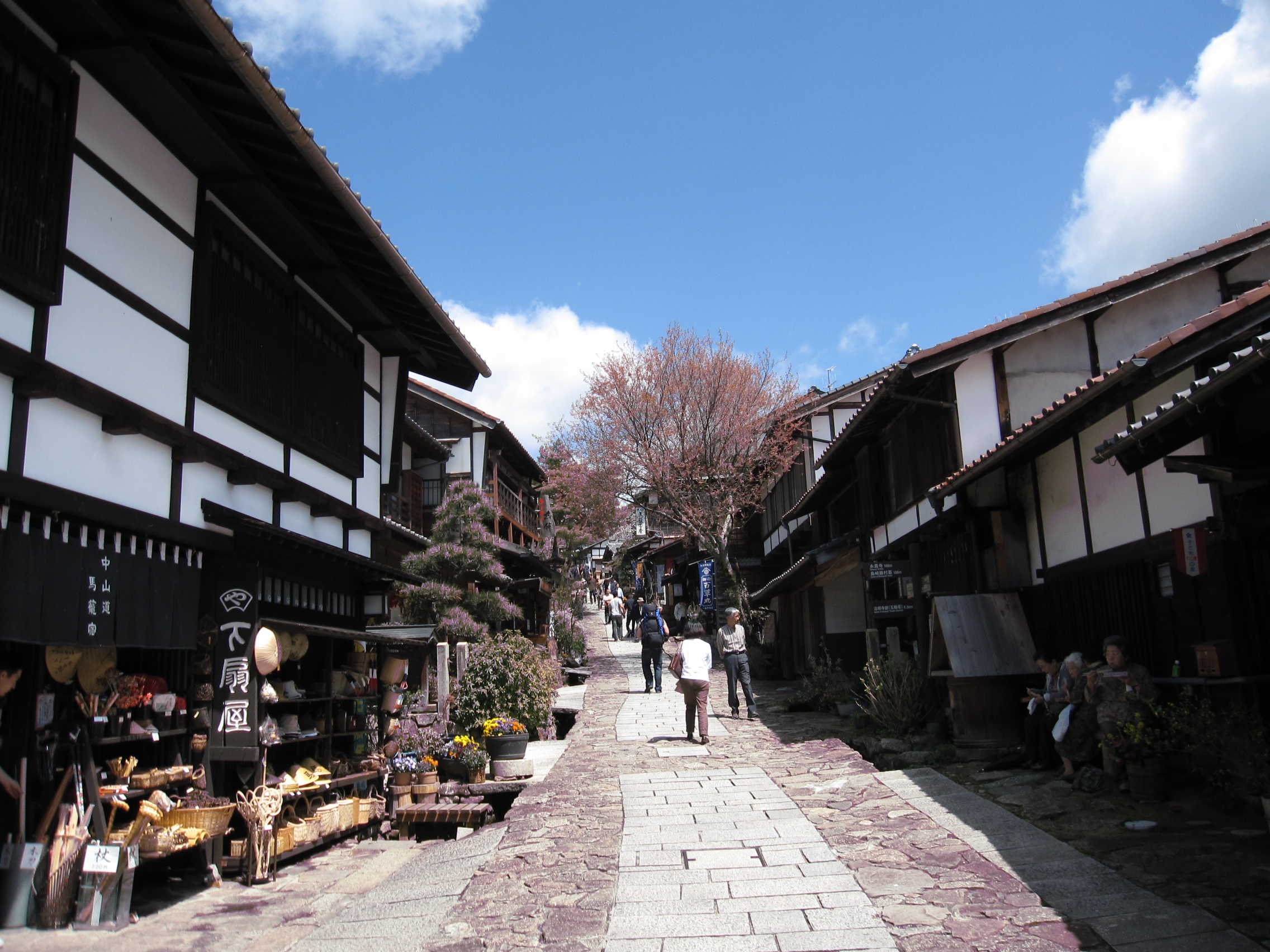
Magome-juku on the Nakasendō

Nakatsugawa (中津川市, Nakatsugawa-shi) is a city located in Gifu, Japan. As of 31 December 2018, the city had an estimated population of 78,930, and a population density of 120 persons per km^{2} in 30,788 households. The total area of the city was 676.45 square kilometres (261.18 sq mi).

== Geography ==
Nakatsugawa is in the Tōnō region of far eastern Gifu Prefecture, bordering on Nagano Prefecture. Mount Ena, the southernmost of the Kiso Mountains on the border between Nakatsugawa, Aichi and Nagano Prefecture is the highest point in the city, with an elevation of 2,191 metres (7,188 ft). The Kiso River and the Agi River flow through the city.

=== Neighbouring municipalities ===
- Gifu Prefecture
  - Ena
  - Gero
  - Higashishirakawa
  - Shirakawa
- Nagano Prefecture
  - Achi
  - Hiraya
  - Kiso
  - Ōkuwa
  - Ōtaki

== Climate ==
The city has a climate characterized by hot and humid summers, and mild winters (Köppen climate classification Cfa). The average annual temperature in Nakatsugawa is 13.5 °C (56.3 °F). The average annual rainfall is 1,907.1 mm (75.08 in) with July as the wettest month. The temperatures are highest on average in August, at around 26.1 °C (79.0 °F), and lowest in January, at around 1.1 °C (34.0 °F).

Climate data for Nakatsugawa (2010–2020 normals, extremes 2010–present)
Month	Jan	Feb	Mar	Apr	May	Jun	Jul	Aug	Sep	Oct	Nov	Dec	Year
Record high °C (°F)	14.8 (58.6)	21.1 (70.0)	25.3 (77.5)	29.3 (84.7)	32.9 (91.2)	37.0 (98.6)	39.2 (102.6)	38.8 (101.8)	36.5 (97.7)	31.3 (88.3)	25.6 (78.1)	21.8 (71.2)	39.2 (102.6)
Mean daily maximum °C (°F)	6.9 (44.4)	8.6 (47.5)	13.5 (56.3)	18.6 (65.5)	24.4 (75.9)	27.0 (80.6)	30.6 (87.1)	32.4 (90.3)	28.0 (82.4)	22.2 (72.0)	15.8 (60.4)	9.2 (48.6)	19.8 (67.6)
Daily mean °C (°F)	1.1 (34.0)	2.3 (36.1)	6.5 (43.7)	11.7 (53.1)	17.5 (63.5)	21.0 (69.8)	25.0 (77.0)	26.1 (79.0)	22.1 (71.8)	16.1 (61.0)	9.4 (48.9)	3.6 (38.5)	13.5 (56.3)
Mean daily minimum °C (°F)	−3.5 (25.7)	−2.7 (27.1)	0.7 (33.3)	5.5 (41.9)	11.1 (52.0)	16.4 (61.5)	20.9 (69.6)	21.9 (71.4)	17.7 (63.9)	11.4 (52.5)	4.3 (39.7)	−0.8 (30.6)	8.6 (47.5)
Record low °C (°F)	−10.4 (13.3)	−10.7 (12.7)	−6.8 (19.8)	−4.2 (24.4)	1.3 (34.3)	7.6 (45.7)	16.5 (61.7)	15.8 (60.4)	7.9 (46.2)	0.7 (33.3)	−3.1 (26.4)	−8.4 (16.9)	−10.7 (12.7)
Average precipitation mm (inches)	59.0 (2.32)	90.6 (3.57)	141.0 (5.55)	165.3 (6.51)	153.8 (6.06)	219.5 (8.64)	289.7 (11.41)	240.1 (9.45)	241.8 (9.52)	178.5 (7.03)	91.4 (3.60)	76.1 (3.00)	1,907.1 (75.08)
Average precipitation days (≥ 1.0 mm)	5.9	7.7	10.1	10.5	9.9	13.8	15.5	12.9	11.6	9.9	7.5	8.7	124.3
Mean monthly sunshine hours	160.8	160.9	195.3	191.2	230.3	157.3	167.8	195.3	160.1	164.4	154.6	137.3	2,077.9
Source: Japan Meteorological Agency (2010–2020 normals, extremes 2010–present)

== Demographics ==
Per Japanese census data, the population of Nakatsugawa peaked around the year 2000 and has declined since.

Historical population
Year	Pop.	±%
1970	79,593	—
1980	83,539	+5.0%
1990	84,410	+1.0%
2000	85,004	+0.7%
2010	80,910	−4.8%
2020	76,570	−5.4%

== History ==
The area around Nakatsugawa was part of traditional Mino Province. During the Edo period, much of the area was under the control of Owari Domain, Naegi Domain and Iwamura Domain, or was tenryō under direction control of the Tokugawa shogunate. Nakatsugawa-juku prospered as one of the 69 Stations of the Nakasendō along the Nakasendō highway connecting Edo with Kyoto. In the post-Meiji restoration cadastral reforms, Ena District in Gifu prefecture was created, and Nakatsugawa was proclaimed a town per the April 1, 1897 establishment of the modern municipalities system. Nakatsugawa merged with the town of Naegi in 1951 and was elevated to city status on April 1, 1952. Nakatsugawa annexed the village of Nakamoto in 1954, Ochiai in 1956, and Agi in 1957. On February 13, 2005, the towns of Tsukechi, Fukuoka and Sakashita and the villages of Hirukawa, Kashimo and Kawaue (all from the former Ena District), and the village of Yamaguchi (from Kiso District, Nagano Prefecture) were merged into Nakatsugawa.

== Government ==
Nakatsugawa has a mayor-council form of government with a directly elected mayor and a unicameral city legislature of 24 members.

== Education ==
=== Colleges and universities ===
- Chukyo Gakuin University
- Nagoya University – Nakatsugawa campus

=== Primary and secondary education ===
Nakatsugawa has 19 public elementary schools and 12 public middle schools operated by the city government. The city has four public high schools operated by the Gifu Prefectural Board of Education, and one public high school operated by the city government.

== Transportation ==
=== Railway ===
- – JR Central – Chūō Main Line
  - Sakashita – Ochiaigawa – Nakatsugawa – Mino-Sakamoto
- Akechi Railway (Akechi Line)
  - Iinuma – Agi

=== Highway ===
- Chūō Expressway
- National Route 19
- National Route 256
- National Route 257
- National Route 363

== Sister cities ==
=== International ===
- Registro, São Paulo, Brazil, since 1980

=== Domestic ===
- (Nagano Prefecture) Komoro, Nagano, since 1973
- (Kanagawa Prefecture) Ōiso, Kanagawa, since 1973

== Local attractions ==
- Kurikinton – Nakatsugawa is known for its abundant chestnut harvest and the chestnut delicacy known as kurikinton (栗きんとん). Kurikinton is produced by boiling and mashing the chestnuts, then mixing them with sugar and reforming into a chestnut shape. It is widely available during the autumn months. Many families make their own, while purchased kurikinton is popular as well for home consumption and as gifts.
- Misaka Pass, a National Historic Site
- Takamine Co., a Japanese guitar manufacturer known for its steel-string acoustic guitars is headquartered in Nakatsugawa.

== Notable people from Nakatsugawa ==
- Junji Ito, horror mangaka
- Seison Maeda, Nihonga painter
