= Ena District, Gifu =

Former district in Gifu prefecture, Japan

Ena (恵那郡, Ena-gun) was a district located in Gifu Prefecture, Japan.

As of 2003, the district had an estimated population of 48,776 and a density of 68.95 persons per km^{2}. The total area was 707.36 km^{2}.

== Culture ==
The local wasps were eaten as a delicacy in the period when the district existed. This continued into 2020.

== Mergers ==
- On October 25, 2004 - the towns of Akechi, Iwamura, Kamiyahagi and Yamaoka, and the village of Kushihara were merged into the expanded city of Ena.
- On February 13, 2005 - the towns of Fukuoka, Sakashita and Tsukechi, and the villages of Hirukawa, Kashimo and Kawaue, along with the village of Yamaguchi (from Kiso District, Nagano Prefecture), were merged into the expanded city of Nakatsugawa .
