= Mugi, Gifu =

Dissolved municipality in Mugi district, Gifu prefecture, Japan

Map of Mugi, Gifu

Mugi (武儀町, Mugi-chō) was a town located in Mugi District, Gifu Prefecture, Japan.

As of 2003, the town had an estimated population of 4,038 and a density of 61.87 persons per km^{2}. The total area was 65.27 km^{2}.

On February 7, 2005, Mugi, along with the town of Mugegawa, and the villages of Horado, Itadori and Kaminoho (all from Mugi District), was merged into the expanded city of Seki.
