= Yamaguchi, Nagano =

Dissolved municipality in Kiso district, Nagano prefecture, Japan

Coordinates: 35°33′25″N 137°32′39″E

Map of Yamaguchi, Nagano

Yamaguchi (山口村, Yamaguchi-mura) was a village located in Kiso District, Nagano Prefecture, Japan.

As of 2003, the village had an estimated population of 2052 and a population density of 83.18 persons per km^{2}. The total area was 24.67 km^{2}.

On February 13, 2005, Yamaguchi, along with the towns of Fukuoka, Sakashita and Tsukechi, and the villages of Hirukawa, Kashimo and Kawaue (all from Ena District, Gifu Prefecture), was merged into the expanded city of Nakatsugawa in Gifu Prefecture and no longer exists as an independent municipality.
