= Kaminoho, Gifu =

Dissolved municipality in Gifu prefecture, Japan

Map of Kaminoho, Gifu

Kaminoho (上之保村, Kaminoho-mura) was a village located in Mugi District, Gifu Prefecture, Japan.

As of 2005, the village had an estimated population of 2,306 and a density of 46.76 persons per km^{2}. The total area was 49.32 km^{2}.

On 7 February 2005, Kaminoho, along with the towns of Mugegawa and Mugi, and the villages of Horado and Itadori (all from Mugi District), was merged into the expanded city of Seki.
