= Kamiyahagi, Gifu =

Dissolved municipality in Gifu prefecture, Japan

Map of Kamiyahagi, Gifu

Kamiyahagi (上矢作町, Kamiyahagi-chō) was a town located in Ena District, Gifu Prefecture, Japan.

As of 2003, the town had an estimated population of 2,563 and a density of 19.57 persons per km^{2}. The total area was 130.96 km^{2}.

On October 25, 2004, Kamiyahagi, along with the towns of Akechi, Iwamura and Yamaoka, and the village of Kushihara (all from Ena District), was merged into the expanded city of Ena, and no longer exists as an independent municipality.
