= Fukuoka, Gifu =

Dissolved municipality in Gifu prefecture, Japan

Map of Fukuoka, Gifu

Fukuoka (福岡町, Fukuoka-chō) was a town located in Ena District, Gifu Prefecture, Japan.

As of 2003, the town had an estimated population of 7,148 and a density of 84.80 persons per km^{2}. The total area was 84.29 km^{2}.

On February 13, 2005, Fukuoka, along with the towns of Sakashita and Tsukechi, the villages of Hirukawa, Kashimo and Kawaue (all from Ena District), and the village of Yamaguchi (from Kiso District, Nagano Prefecture), was merged into the expanded city of Nakatsugawa and no longer exists as an independent municipality.

== History ==
The modern history of Fukuoka dates back to the Meiji era. In 1889, three villages of Fukuoka, Takayama and Tase were incorporated with a new status under the Municipal Act of 1888. Fukuoka merged the village of Shimono in 1897 and was raised to the rank of a town in 1966. The town had four school districts based on these old villages.
