= Hirukawa, Gifu =

Dissolved municipality in Gifu prefecture, Japan

Map of Hirukawa, Gifu

Hirukawa (蛭川村, Hirukawa-mura) was a village located in Ena District, Gifu Prefecture, Japan.

As of 2003, the village had an estimated population of 3,806 and a density of 84.92 persons per km^{2}. The total area was 44.82 km^{2}.

On February 13, 2005, Hirukawa, along with the towns of Fukuoka, Sakashita and Tsukechi, the villages of Kashimo and Kawaue (all from Ena District), and the village of Yamaguchi (from Kiso District, Nagano Prefecture), was merged into the expanded city of Nakatsugawa and no longer exists as an independent municipality.
