= Kashimo, Gifu =

Dissolved municipality in Gifu prefecture, Japan

Coordinates: 35.715°N 137.3711°E

Map of Kashimo, Gifu

Kashimo (加子母村, Kashimo-mura) was a village located in Ena District, Gifu Prefecture, Japan.

As of 2003, the village had an estimated population of 3,383 and a density of 29.63 persons per km^{2}. The total area was 114.16 km^{2}.

On February 13, 2005, Kashimo, along with the towns of Fukuoka, Sakashita and Tsukechi, the villages of Hirukawa and Kawaue (all from Ena District), and the village of Yamaguchi (from Kiso District, Nagano Prefecture), was merged into the expanded city of Nakatsugawa and no longer exists as an independent municipality.
