= Kawaue, Gifu =

Dissolved municipality in Gifu prefecture, Japan

Coordinates: 35°36′49.11″N 137°29′56.57″E

Map of Kawaue, Gifu

Kawaue (川上村, Kawaue-mura) was a village located in Ena District, Gifu Prefecture, Japan.

As of 2003, the village had an estimated population of 988 and a density of 33.69 persons per km^{2}. The total area was 29.33 km^{2}.

On February 13, 2005 Kawaue, along with the towns of Fukuoka, Sakashita and Tsukechi, the villages of Hirukawa and Kashimo (all from Ena District), and the village of Yamaguchi (from Kiso District, Nagano Prefecture), was merged into the expanded city of Nakatsugawa and no longer exists as an independent municipality.
