= Mugi District, Gifu =

Former district in Gifu prefecture, Japan

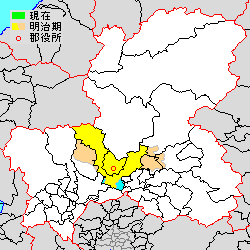
Area of Mugi County, Gifu Prefecture

Mugi (武儀郡, Mugi-gun) was a district located in Gifu, Japan. The district was dissolved after it was merged into the nearby city of Seki on February 7, 2005.

As of 2003, the district had an estimated population of 17,069 and a population density of 46.09 persons per km^{2}. The total area was 370.33 km^{2}.

== Towns and villages ==
- On February 7, 2005, the towns and villages of Horado, Itadori, Kaminoho, Mugegawa and Mugi were merged into the city of Seki.
