= Japan National Route 363 =

National highway in Japan

National Route 363
- 国道363号
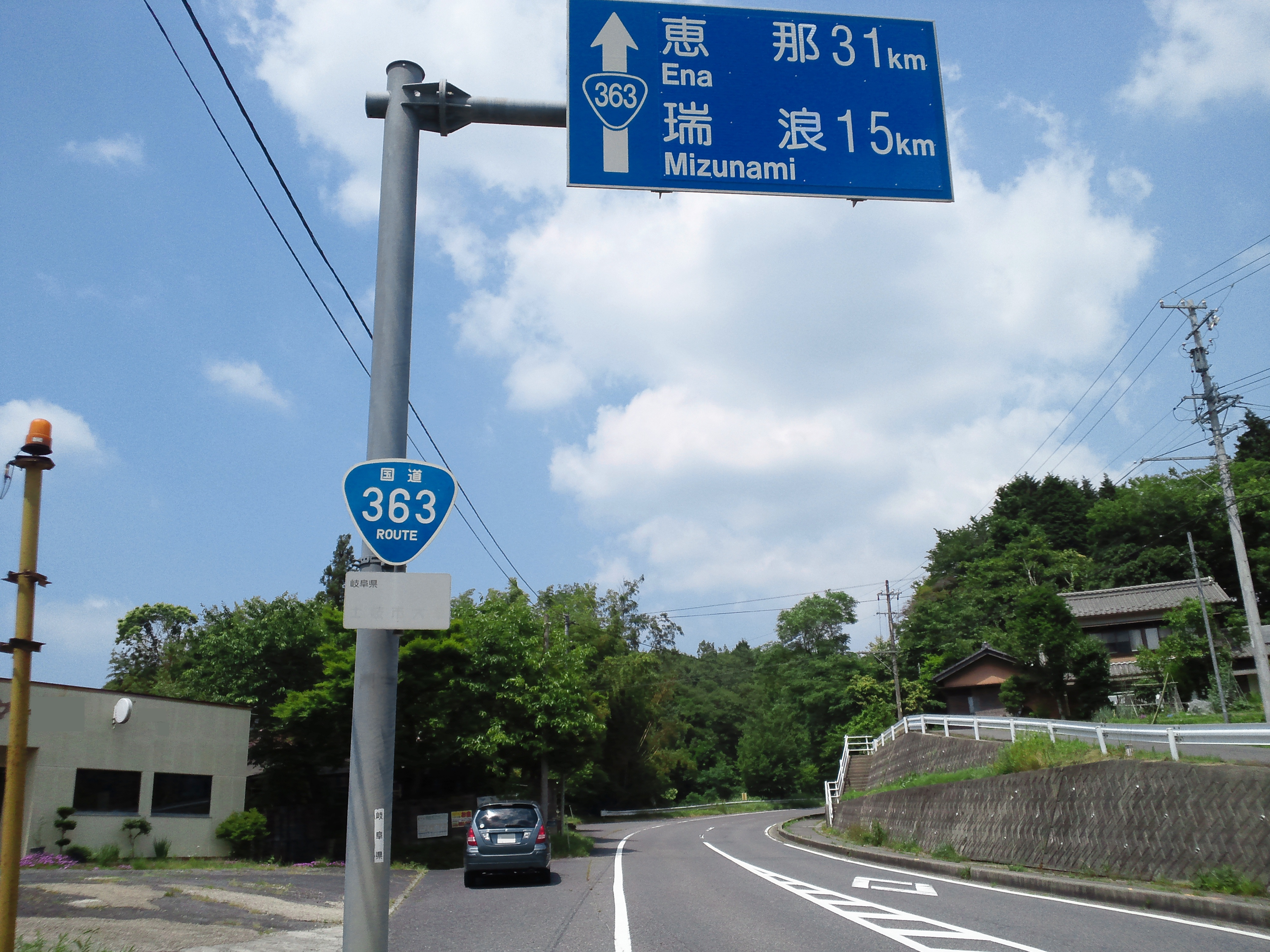

Route information
- Length: 80.2 km (49.8 mi)
- Existed: 1975–present

Major junctions
- West end: National Route 302 in Meitō-ku, Nagoya
- East end: National Route 19 in Nakatsugawa, Gifu

Location
- Country: Japan

Highway system
- National highways of Japan; Expressways of Japan
← National Route 362	→ National Route 364

National Route 363 is a national highway of Japan connecting Meitō-ku, Nagoya and Nakatsugawa, Gifu in Japan, with a total length of 80.2 km (49.8 mi).
