= Akechi, Gifu =

Dissolved municipality in Gifu prefecture, Japan

Location of Akechi in Gifu Prefecture

Akechi (明智町, Akechi-chō) was a town located in Ena District, Gifu Prefecture, Japan.

As of 2003, the town had an estimated population of 6,687 and a density of 99.61 persons per km^{2}. The total area was 67.13 km^{2}.

On October 25, 2004, Akechi, along with the towns of Iwamura, Kamiyahagi and Yamaoka, and the village of Kushihara (all from Ena District), was merged into the expanded city of Ena, and no longer exists as an independent municipality.

Akechi is known for Nihon Taishō Mura. The town is also the home of the Akechi Hilltop Circuit, a popular small go-kart and mini-bike racing course tucked away at the top of a local mountain.
