= Acer pycnanthum =

- Autumn colors

Conservation status
- Vulnerable (IUCN 3.1)

Scientific classification
- Kingdom: Plantae
- Clade: Embryophytes
- Clade: Tracheophytes
- Clade: Spermatophytes
- Clade: Angiosperms
- Clade: Eudicots
- Clade: Rosids
- Order: Sapindales
- Family: Sapindaceae
- Genus: Acer
- Section: Acer sect. Rubra
- Species: A. pycnanthum

Binomial name
- Acer pycnanthum K.Koch

Synonyms
- Acer rubrum var. pycnanthum (K.Koch) Makino

Species of tree

Acer pycnanthum, the Japanese red maple (ハナノキ, hananoki, or 花の木, hanakaede, meaning "flower maple"), is a species of maple native to Japan, and introduced to Korea. A tree usually about 20 m, reaching 30 m, it prefers to grow in relict mountain wetlands. It flowers in April, prior to the emergence of leaves. Although considered Vulnerable in its native habitat, it has found some use as a street tree, and is the official tree of a number of Japanese municipalities and of Aichi Prefecture.

Acer pycnanthum is dioecious, with separate male and female flowers. The bark is grey and longitudinally fissured, sometimes giving a shaggy appearance. The leaves, which emerge a bronze-green color in the spring, are shallowly lobed and have a whitish bloom on the underside. They turn yellow, orange, red, and purple in the autumn. It is similar to the smaller Acer rubrum.

A. pycanthum is suitable for USDA hardiness zone 5. It prefers full sun to partial shade and is hardy in all of the UK and northern Europe. Common problems include aphids and verticillium wilt.

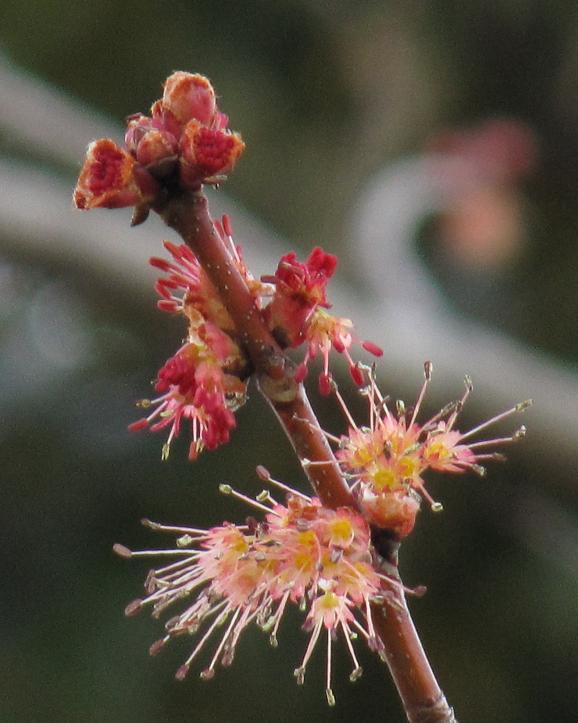
Spring flowers and leaf buds
