= Sakashita, Gifu =

Dissolved municipality in Gifu prefecture, Japan

Map of Sakashita, Gifu

Sakashita (坂下町, Sakashita-chō) was a town located in Ena District, Gifu Prefecture, Japan.

== Population ==
As of 2003, the town had an estimated population of 5,753 and a density of 193.25 persons per km^{2}. The total area was 29.77 km^{2}.

== History ==
On February 13, 2005, Sakashita, along with the towns of Fukuoka and Tsukechi, the villages of Hirukawa, Kashimo and Kawaue (all from Ena District), and the village of Yamaguchi (from Kiso District, Nagano Prefecture), was merged into the expanded city of Nakatsugawa and no longer exists as an independent municipality.

On February 27, 2005, the town was in the national news when five members of a household in Sakashita were stabbed and killed by a member of their family.
