= Yamagata, Gifu =

Yamagata 山県市
- City
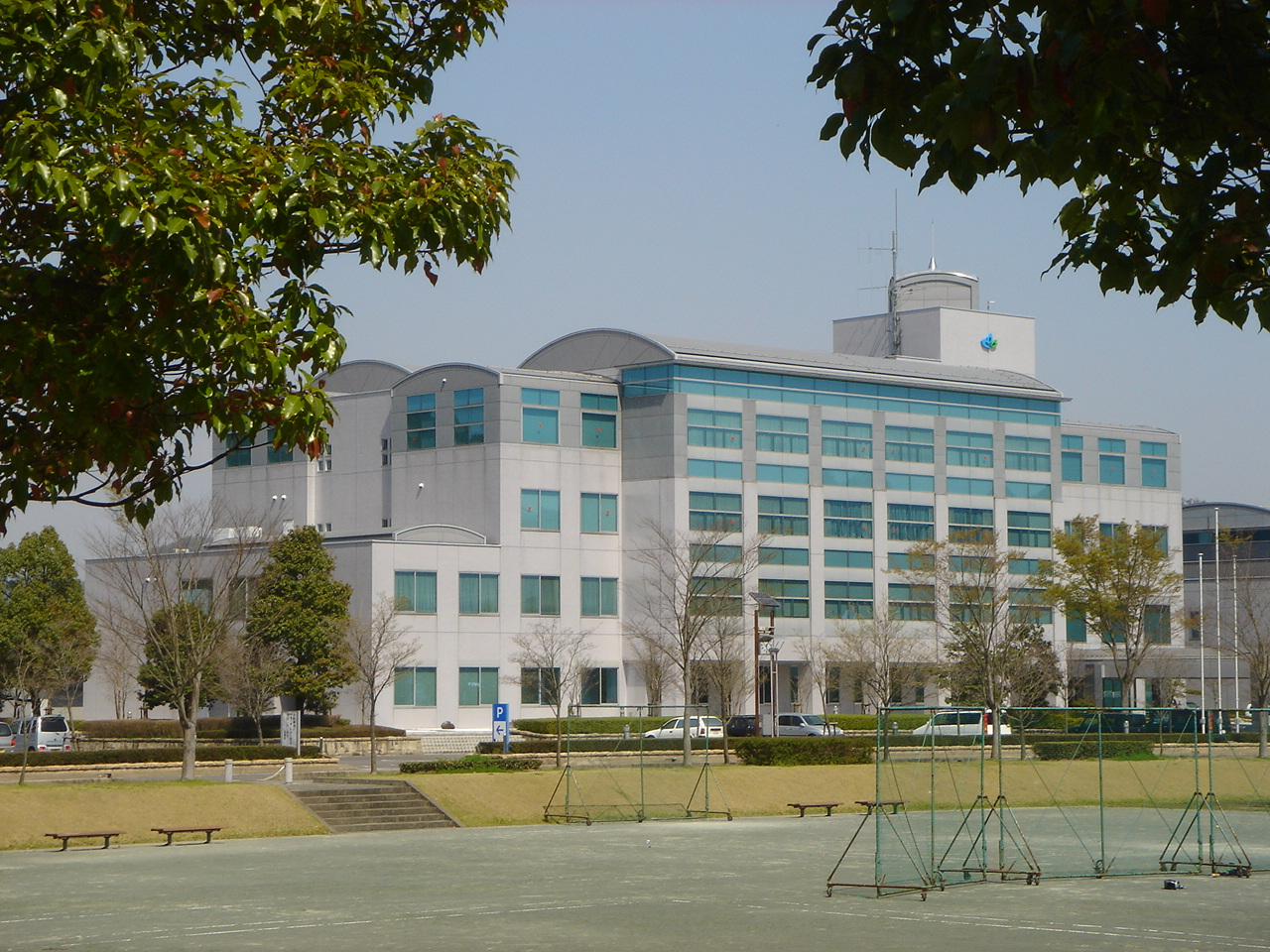
- Yamagata City Hall

- Flag Seal

- Location of Yamagata in Gifu Prefecture

- Coordinates: 35°30′22″N 136°46′51.9″E
- Country: Japan
- Region: Chūbu
- Prefecture: Gifu

Government
  - Mayor: Hiromasa Hayashi

Area
  - Total: 221.98 km^{2} (85.71 sq mi)

Population (January 1, 2019)
  - Total: 27,356
  - Density: 123.24/km^{2} (319.18/sq mi)
- Time zone: UTC+9 (Japan Standard Time)
- City symbols
- Tree: Chestnut
- Flower: Japanese bellflower
- Phone number: 0581-22-2111
- Address: 1000-1 Takaki, Yamagata-shi, Gifu-ken 501–2192
- Website: Official website

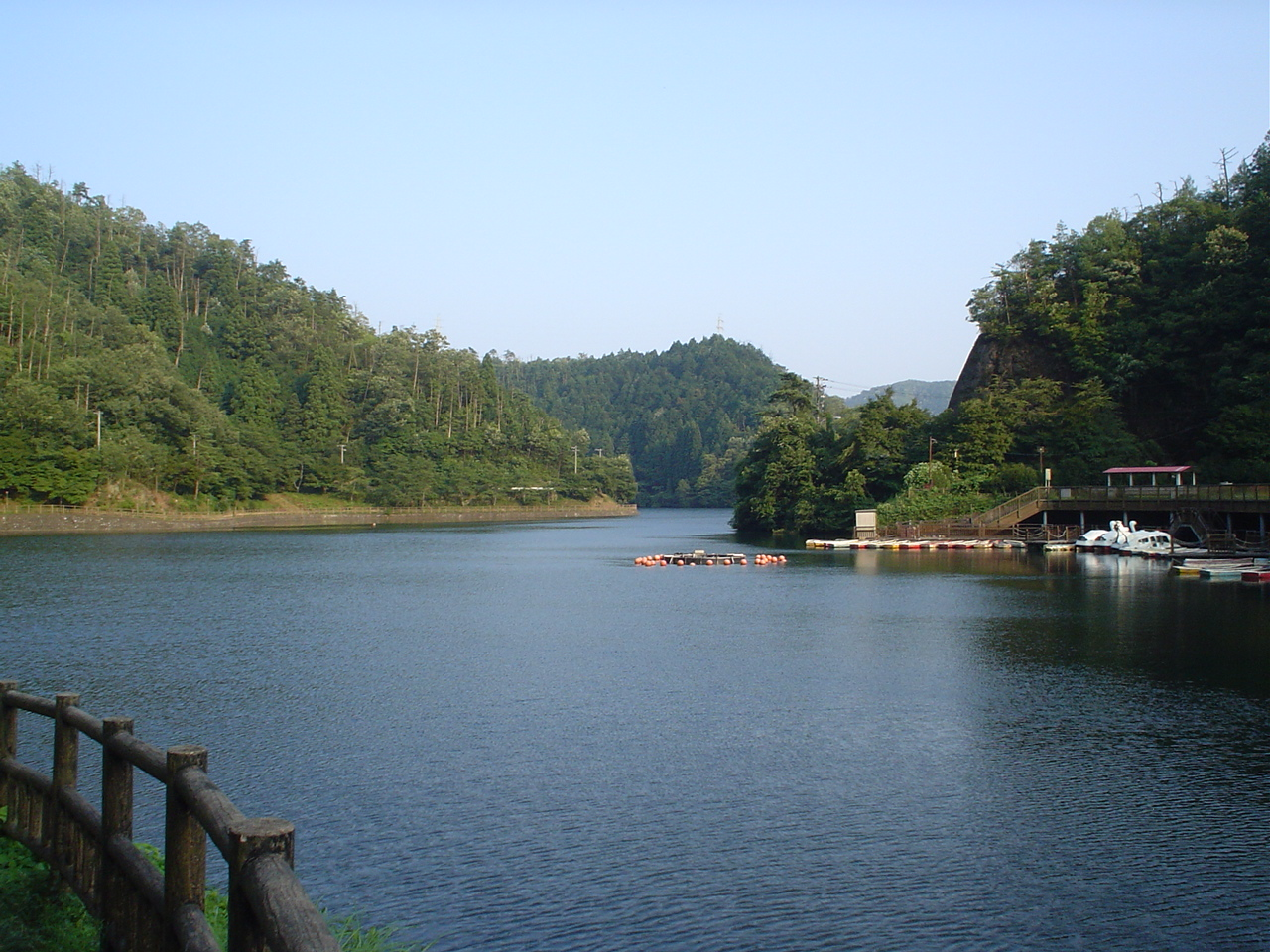
Lake Ijira in Yamagata

Yamagata (山県市, Yamagata-shi; Japanese pronunciation: [jä̀.mä́.ɡä̀.tä̀, -ŋä̀.tä̀, -ɡä́.tä́.ɕì, -ŋä́.tä́-]) is a city located in Gifu, Japan. As of 1 January 2019, the city had an estimated population of 27,356 in 10,868 households, and a population density of 120 persons per km^{2}. The total area of the city was 221.98 square kilometres (85.71 sq mi).

== Geography ==
Yamagata is located in south-west Gifu Prefecture, north of the prefectural capital of Gifu city. Mount Funabuse, on the border between Motosu and Yamagata is the highest point in the city, with an elevation of 1,040 metres (3,410 ft).

=== Climate ===
The city has a climate characterized by hot and humid summers, and mild winters (Köppen climate classification Cfa). The average annual temperature in Yamagata is 15.2 °C. The average annual rainfall is 2086 mm with September as the wettest month. The temperatures are highest on average in August, at around 27.9 °C, and lowest in January, at around 3.7 °C.

=== Neighbouring municipalities ===
- Gifu Prefecture
  - Gifu
  - Motosu
  - Seki

== Demographics ==
Per Japanese census data, the population of Yamagata peaked around 1990 and has declined since.

Historical population
Year	Pop.	±%
1970	26,598	—
1980	29,669	+11.5%
1990	30,989	+4.4%
2000	30,951	−0.1%
2010	29,629	−4.3%
2020	25,280	−14.7%

== History ==
The area around Yamagata was part of traditional Mino Province. The name, "Yamagata", can be found in Nara period records, and is thus one of the oldest place names in Japan. During the Edo period, much of the area was tenryō territory under the direct control of the Tokugawa shogunate. In the post-Meiji restoration cadastral reforms, Yamagata District in Gifu prefecture was created. The village of Takatomi was established on July 1, 1889, with the establishment of the modern municipalities system, and was raised to town status on March 19, 1897.

Takatomi and the town of Miyama and village of Ijira (all from Yamagata District) merged to form the city of Yamagata on April 1, 2003.

== Government ==
Yamagata has a mayor-council form of government with a directly elected mayor and a unicameral city legislature of 14 members.

== Economy ==
Yamagata was traditionally known for its textile industry, and for the production of wooden bobbins for use in textile looms.

== Education ==
Yamagata has nine public elementary schools and three public middle schools operated by the city government. The city has one public high school operated by the Gifu Prefectural Board of Education.

== Transportation ==
=== Railway ===
- The city does not have any passenger rail service.

=== Highway ===
- Tōkai-Kanjō Expressway
- National Route 256
- National Route 418

== Sister cities ==
- Florence, Oregon, United States, friendship city
