= Gujo (disambiguation) =

Gujō is a city in Gifu Prefecture, Japan.

Gujō or Gujo may also refer to:

- Gujō District, Gifu, a former district in Gifu Prefecture, Japan
- Gujō Domain, a fudai feudal domain of Edo period Japan
- Gujo, Pakistan, a town in Sindh province, Pakistan
