= Minoshi Station =

Railway station in Mino, Gifu Prefecture, Japan

Minoshi Station 美濃市駅
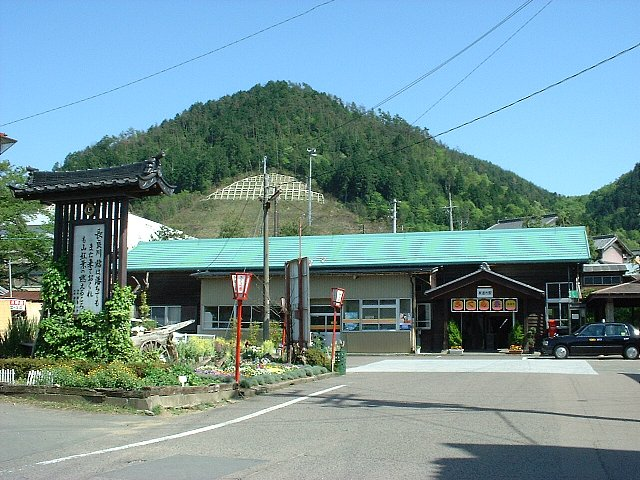
- Minoshi Station in 2004

General information
- Location: Kameno-cho, Mino-shi, Gifu-ken 501-3701; Japan
- Coordinates: 35°32′22.32″N 136°54′54.30″E
- Operator: Nagaragawa Railway
- Line: ■ Etsumi-Nan Line
- Distance: 17.7 km from Mino-Ōta
- Platforms: 1 island platform
- Tracks: 2

Other information
- Status: Staffed
- Website: Official website

History
- Opened: October 5, 1923
- Former names: Minomachi (to 1954)

Passengers
- FY2010: 222
Location
- Location within Gifu Prefecture Location within Japan

Minoshi Station (美濃市駅, Minoshi-eki) is a railway station in the city of Mino, Gifu Prefecture, Japan, operated by the third sector railway operator Nagaragawa Railway.

== Lines ==
Minoshi Station is a station of the Etsumi-Nan Line, and is 17.7 kilometers from the terminus of the line at Mino-Ōta.

== Station layout ==
Minoshi Station has one ground-level island platform connected to the station building by an underground passage. The station is unstaffed.

=== Platforms ===
1	■ Nagaragawa Railway Etsumi-Nan Line	for Gujō-Hachiman, Mino-Shirotori and Hokunō
2	■ Nagaragawa Railway Etsumi-Nan Line	for Mino-Ōta

== Adjacent stations ==
«	Service	»
Nagaragawa Railway
Etsumi-Nan Line
Matsumori	Local	Umeyama

== History ==
Minoshi Station was opened on October 5, 1923 as Minomachi Station (美濃町駅). On November 10, 1954, the station was renamed to its present name. Operations were transferred from the Japan National Railway (JNR) to the Nagaragawa Railway on December 11, 1986. The station was listed as one of Tangible Cultural Properties in 2013.

== Surrounding area ==
- E41 Tōkai-Hokuriku Expressway
- Mino Historical Preservation District
- Mino Post Office

== See also ==
- List of railway stations in Japan
