= Hirugano Botanical Garden =

Botanical garden in Gifu Prefecture, Japan

Coordinates: 35°59′55.5″N 136°53′58.2″E

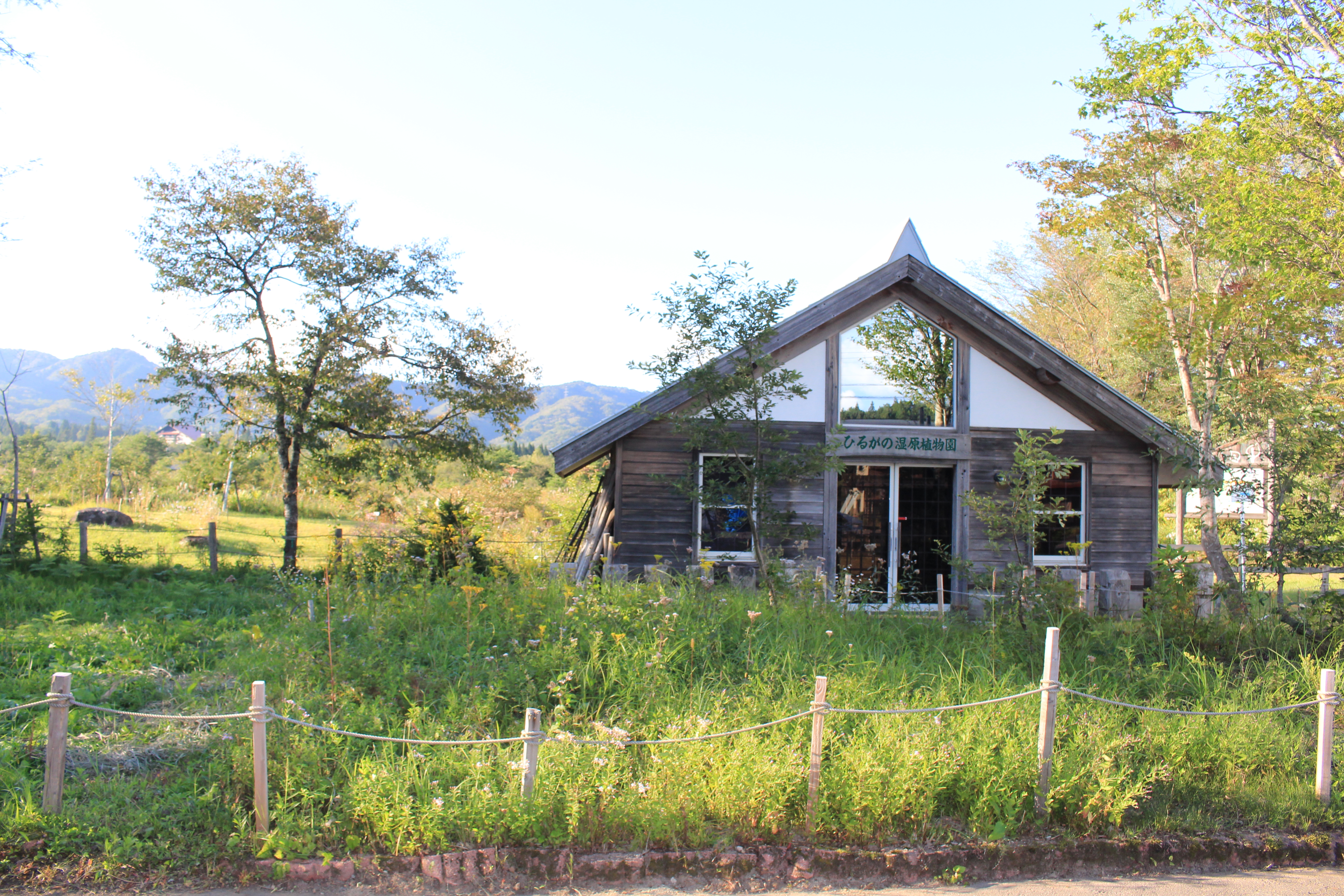
Hirugano-shitsugen Botanical Garden

The Hirugano Botanical Garden (ひるがの湿原植物園, Hirugano Shitsugen Shokubutsuen) is a botanical garden located in the skiing region near Mount Dainichi in the Takasu area of the city of Gujō, Gifu Prefecture, Japan.

== See also ==
- List of botanical gardens in Japan
