= Hanno Station =

Hanno Station may refer to:

- Hanno Station (Gifu) (母野駅) on the Nagaragawa Railway Etsumi-Nan Line in Gujō, Gifu, Japan
- Hannō Station (飯能駅) on the Seibu Ikebukuro Line in Hannō, Saitama, Japan
