= Sekiguchi Station =

Railway station in Seki, Gifu Prefecture, Japan

Sekiguchi Station 関口駅
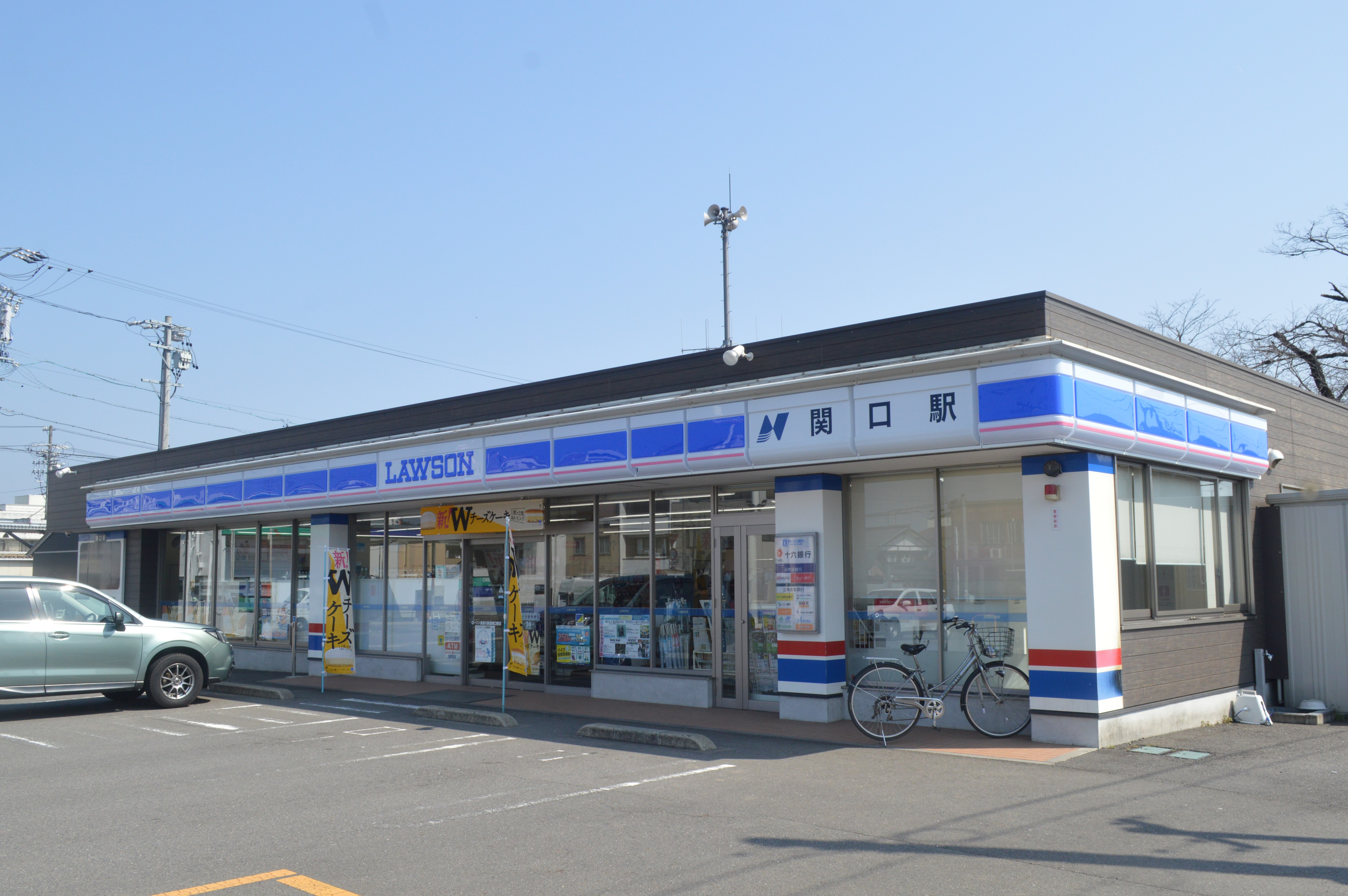
- Sekiguchi Station in March 2024

General information
- Location: 1-3 Sekiguchi-cho, Seki-shi, Gifu-ken 501-3826; Japan
- Coordinates: 35°28′48.12″N 136°55′43.8″E
- Operator: Nagaragawa Railway
- Line: ■ Etsumi-Nan Line
- Distance: 9.7 km from Mino-Ōta
- Platforms: 1 side platform
- Tracks: 1

Other information
- Status: Unstaffed
- Website: Official website

History
- Opened: December 26, 1952
Location
- Location within Gifu Prefecture Location within Japan

Sekiguchi Station (関口駅, Sekiguchi-eki) is a railway station in the city of Seki, Gifu Prefecture, Japan, operated by the third sector railway operator Nagaragawa Railway. It is most notable for its station building being a Lawson convenience store.

== Lines ==
Sekiguchi Station is a station of the Etsumi-Nan Line, and is 9.7 kilometers from the terminus of the line at Mino-Ōta.

== Station layout ==
Sekiguchi Station has one ground-level side platform serving a single bi-directional track. The station is unattended.

== Adjacent stations ==
«	Service	»
Nagaragawa Railway
Etsumi-Nan Line
Seki-Tomioka	Local	Sekiterasumae

== History ==
Sekiguchi Station was opened on December 26, 1952. Operations were transferred from the Japan National Railway (JNR) to the Nagaragawa Railway on December 11, 1986.

== Surrounding area ==
- Gifu Prefectural Seki High School
- National Route 418

== See also ==
- List of railway stations in Japan
