= Gujō-Hachiman Station =

Railway station in Gujō, Gifu Prefecture, Japan

Gujō-HachimanStation 郡上八幡駅
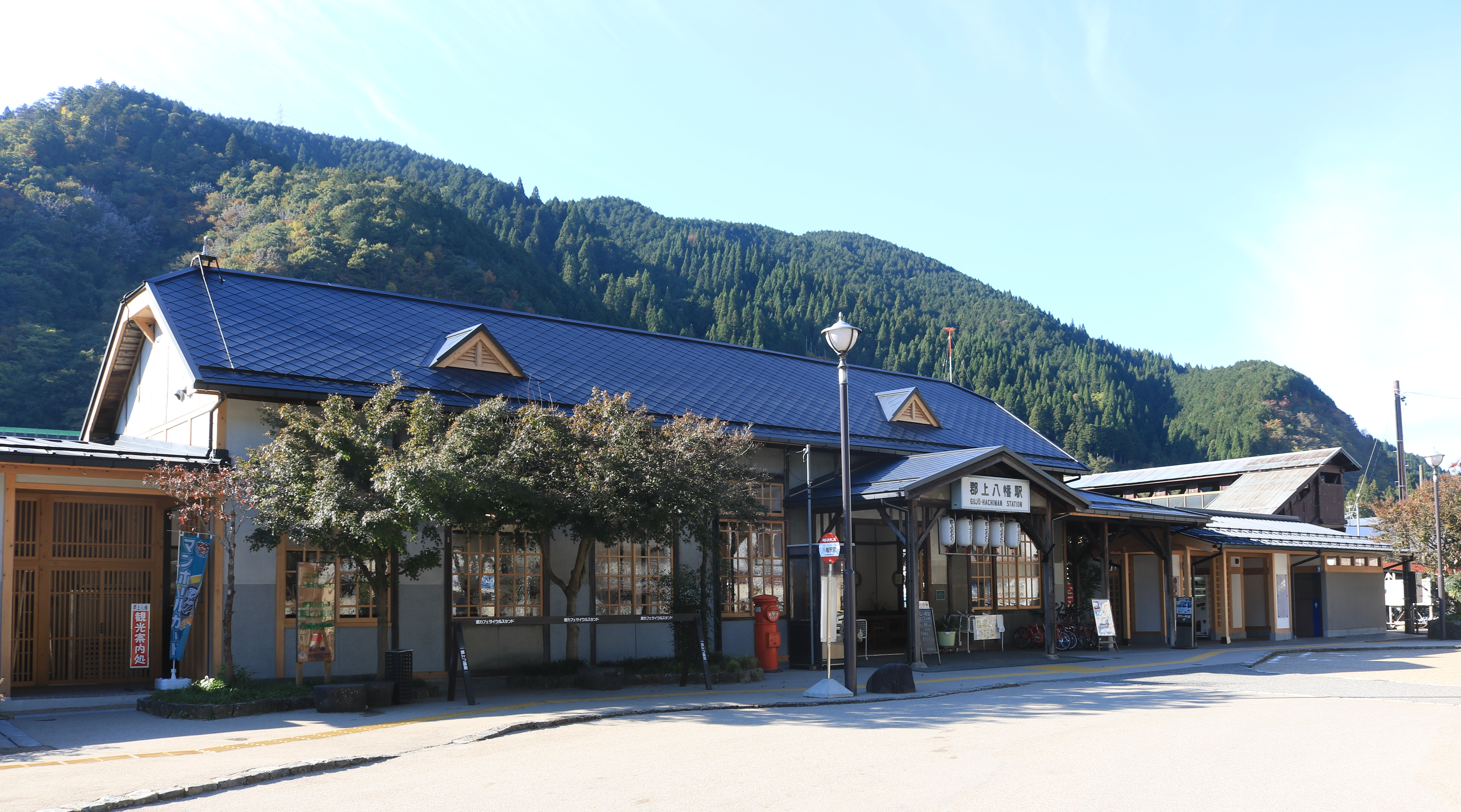
- Gujō-Hachiman Station in July 2015

General information
- Location: Hachiman-cho, Gujō-shi, Gifu-ken 501-4224; Japan
- Coordinates: 35°44′30.95″N 136°56′50.63″E
- Operator: Nagaragawa Railway
- Line: ■ Etsumi-Nan Line
- Distance: 46.9 km from Mino-Ōta
- Platforms: 1 side + 1 island platform
- Tracks: 3

Other information
- Status: Staffed
- Website: Official website

History
- Opened: December 8, 1929
Location
- Location within Gifu Prefecture Location within Japan

Gujō-Hachiman Station (郡上八幡駅, Gujō-Hachiman-eki) is a railway station in the city of Gujō, Gifu Prefecture, Japan, operated by the third sector railway operator Nagaragawa Railway.

== Lines ==
Gujō-Hachiman Station is a station of the Etsumi-Nan Line and is 46.9 kilometers from the terminus of the line at Mino-Ōta.

== Station layout ==
Gujō-Hachiman Station has one ground-level side platform and one ground-level island platform connected to the station building by a footbridge. The station is staffed.

=== Platforms ===
1	■ Etsumi-Nan Line	for Minoshi, Seki and Mino-Ōta
2	■ Etsumi-Nan Line	for Mino-Shirotori, Shirotori-Kōgen and Hokunō
3	■ Etsumi-Nan Line	(siding)

== Adjacent stations ==
«	Service	»
Nagaragawa Railway
Etsumi-Nan Line
Aioi	Local	Shizen'en-mae

== History ==
Gujō-Hachiman Station was opened on December 8, 1929. Operations were transferred from the Japan National Railway (JNR) to the Nagaragawa Railway on December 11, 1986.

== Surrounding area ==
- Nagara River
- National Route 156
- National Route 256

== See also ==
- List of railway stations in Japan
