= Minami-Kodakara-Onsen Station =

Railway station in Gujō, Gifu Prefecture, Japan

Minami-Kodakara-Onsen Station みなみ子宝温泉駅
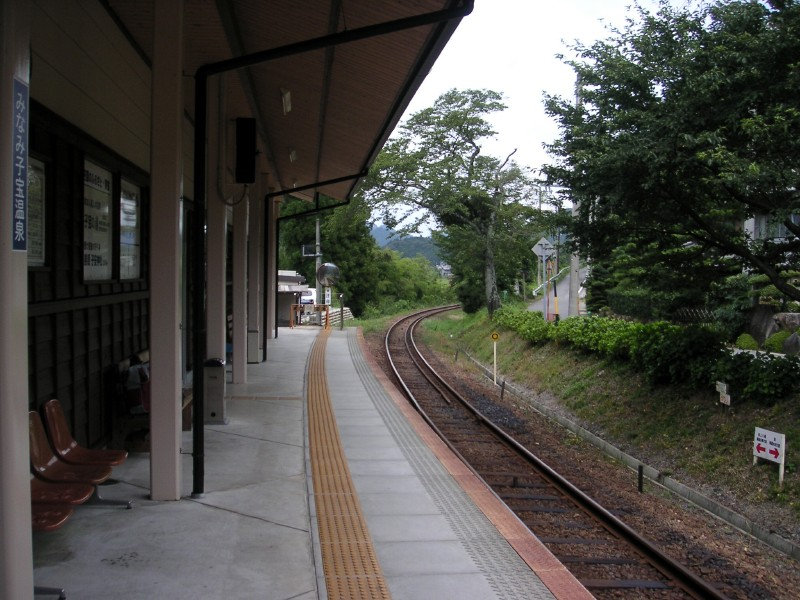
- Minami-Kodakara-Onsen Station in June 2006

General information
- Location: Minami-cho Ōhara, Gujō-shi, Gifu-ken 501-4106; Japan
- Coordinates: 35°37′38.84″N 136°57′1.85″E
- Operator: Nagaragawa Railway
- Line: ■ Etsumi-Nan Line
- Distance: 30.6 km from Mino-Ōta
- Platforms: 1 side platform
- Tracks: 1

Other information
- Status: Staffed
- Website: Official website

History
- Opened: April 4, 2002
Location
- Location within Gifu Prefecture Location within Japan

Minami-Kodakara-Onsen Station (みなみ子宝温泉駅, Minami-Kodakara-Onsen-eki) is a railway station in the city of Gujō, Gifu Prefecture, Japan, operated by the third sector railway operator Nagaragawa Railway.

== Lines ==
Minami-Kodakara-Onsen Station is a station of the Etsumi-Nan Line, and is 30.6 kilometers from the terminus of the line at Mino-Ōta.

== Station layout ==
Minami-Kodakara-Onsen Station has one ground-level side platform serving a single bi-directional track. The station building also contained an onsen, which passengers on the Nagaragawa Railway was able to use at a discount. The onsen closed in 2024. The station is staffed.

== Adjacent stations ==
«	Service	»
Nagaragawa Railway
Etsumi-Nan Line
Yasaka	Local	Ōya

== History ==
Minami-Kodakara-Onsen Station was opened on April 4, 2002.

== Surrounding area ==
- Nagara River

== See also ==
- List of railway stations in Japan
