= Shirakawa-go Bus Terminal =

Bus terminal in Gifu, Japan

Shirakawa-go Bus Terminal 白川郷バスターミナル
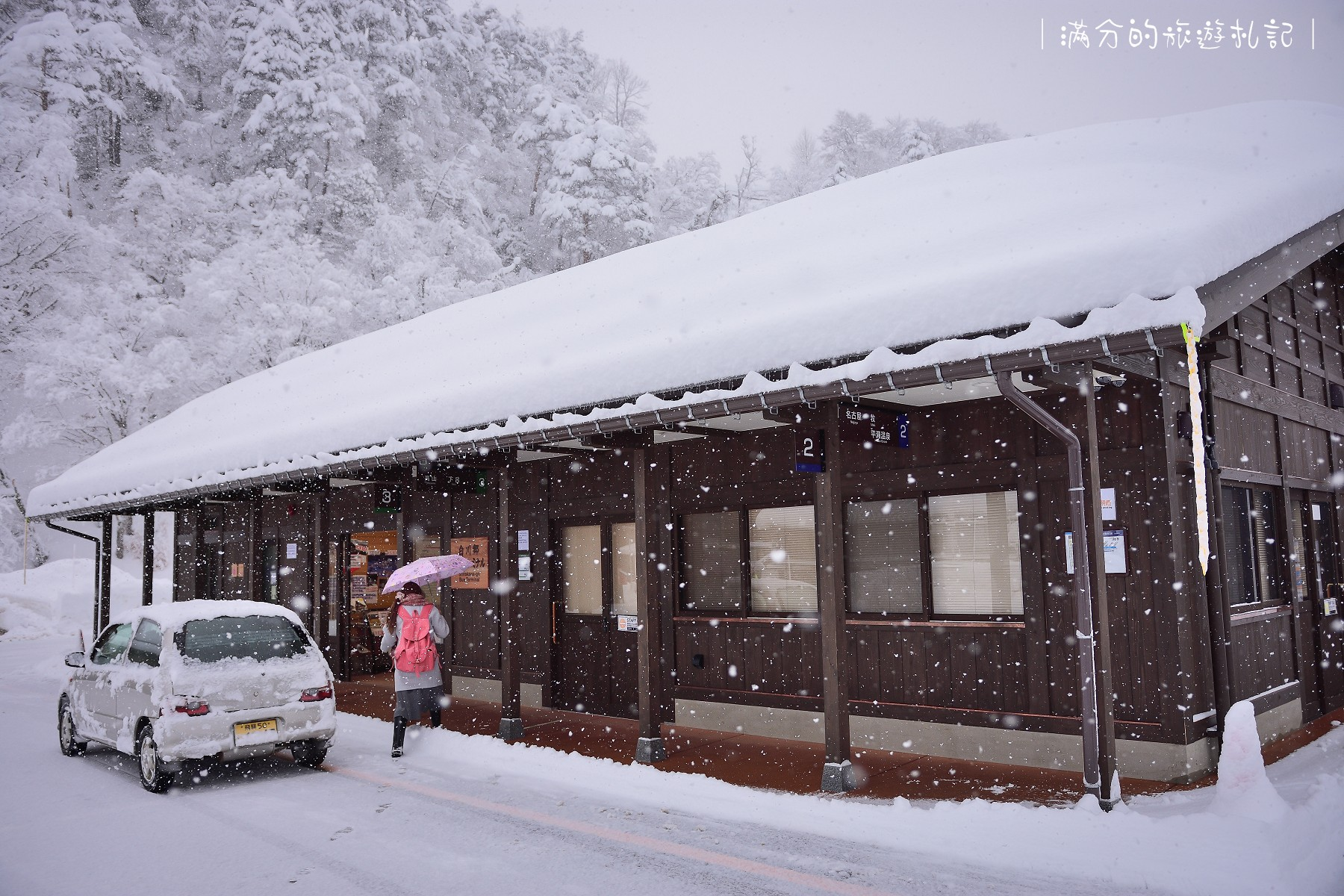

General information
- Location: 1086 Yamakoshi, Ogimachi, Shirakawa, Gifu (village), Ono District, Gifu, Gifu Prefecture(岐阜県大野郡白川村大字荻町字山越1086番地); Japan
- Coordinates: 36.262058°N 136.906881°E

Other information
- Website: official website(en)

History
- Opened: 1 October 2016
Location
- Location within Gifu Prefecture Location within Japan

Shirakawa-go Bus Terminal (白川郷バスターミナル, Shirakawa-gō Bus Terminal) is a bus station in the village of Shirakawa, Gifu in Japan. Bus services are provided by Kaetsuno Bus, Nohi Bus, and Gifu Bus.

== Overview ==
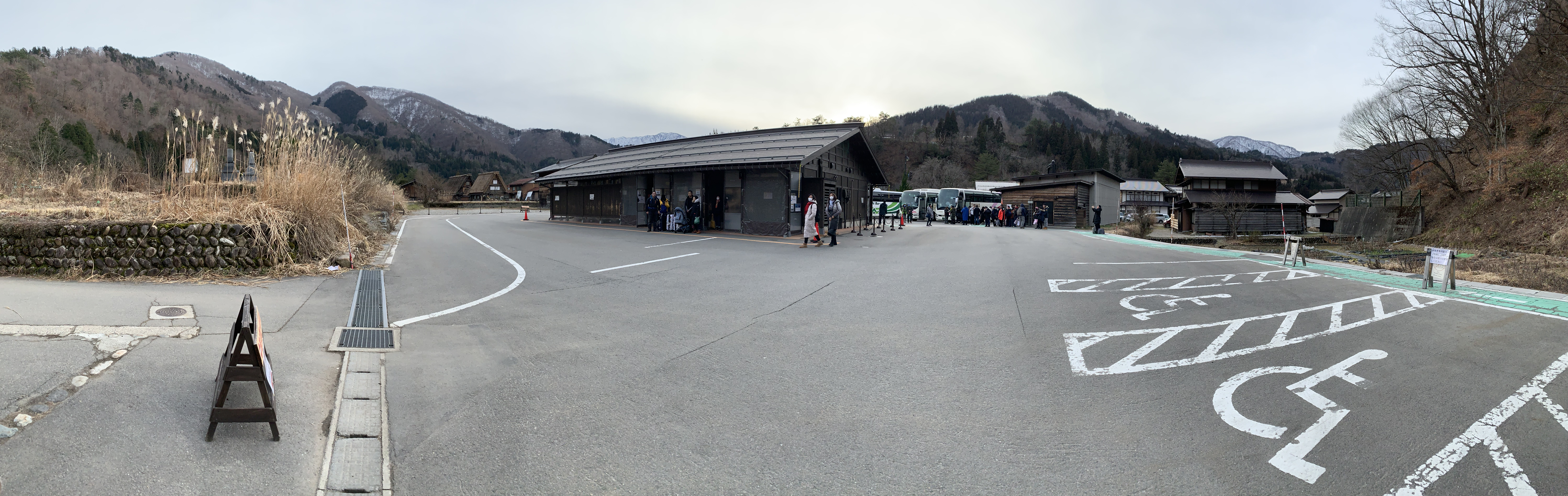
Bus station

The bus station is located near Ogimachi Crossroad on the Japan National Route 156 which is located north of Ogimachi Village.

The number of visitors, and therefore vehicles, to Shirakawa-gō increased drastically in 1995 when the site became a World Heritage Site, resulting in a need to preserve the site. Citizens of Ogimachi requested a ban on through traffic of privately owned vehicles on the village's roads as well as the elimination of privately run parking, in addition to the creation of a bus station, a bus route for tourists, and publicly maintained accessible parking. Some residents expressed confusion at the creation of the bus station, but its establishment was officially decided by residents at a regularly-held village assembly, called an О̄yoriai (lit. "big gathering"), held on 23 December 2012.

While almost all previous buses passing through Shiragkawa-gō had stopped at the bus stop inside the village-run parking lot of the Seseragi Park across the Shō River from Ogimachi, there was concern this stop would be pushed beyond its capacity as the number of buses stopping there increased year-on-year due to an increase in international tourism and the extension of the Hokuriku Shinkansen between Nagano Station and Kanazawa Station in March 2015, resulting in a need to improve safety. There were also concerns regarding congestion of the Deai Bridge with tourists, as the suspension bridge is the only convenient path for crossing the river from the park's parking lot to the village.

As a result, the village moved ahead with the establishment of a new bus station on the site formerly home to the Shirakawa Clinic. An ordinance outlining the requirements for the station's management was completed on 21 June 2016, titled Ordinance on the Establishment and Management of the Shirakawa-gō Bus Terminal. A ceremony was held on 29 September 2016 marking the station's completion, and it opened for operation on 1 October 2016. The bus stop in the Seseragi Park parking lot and the nearby Ogimachi bus stop were removed as the station was opened.

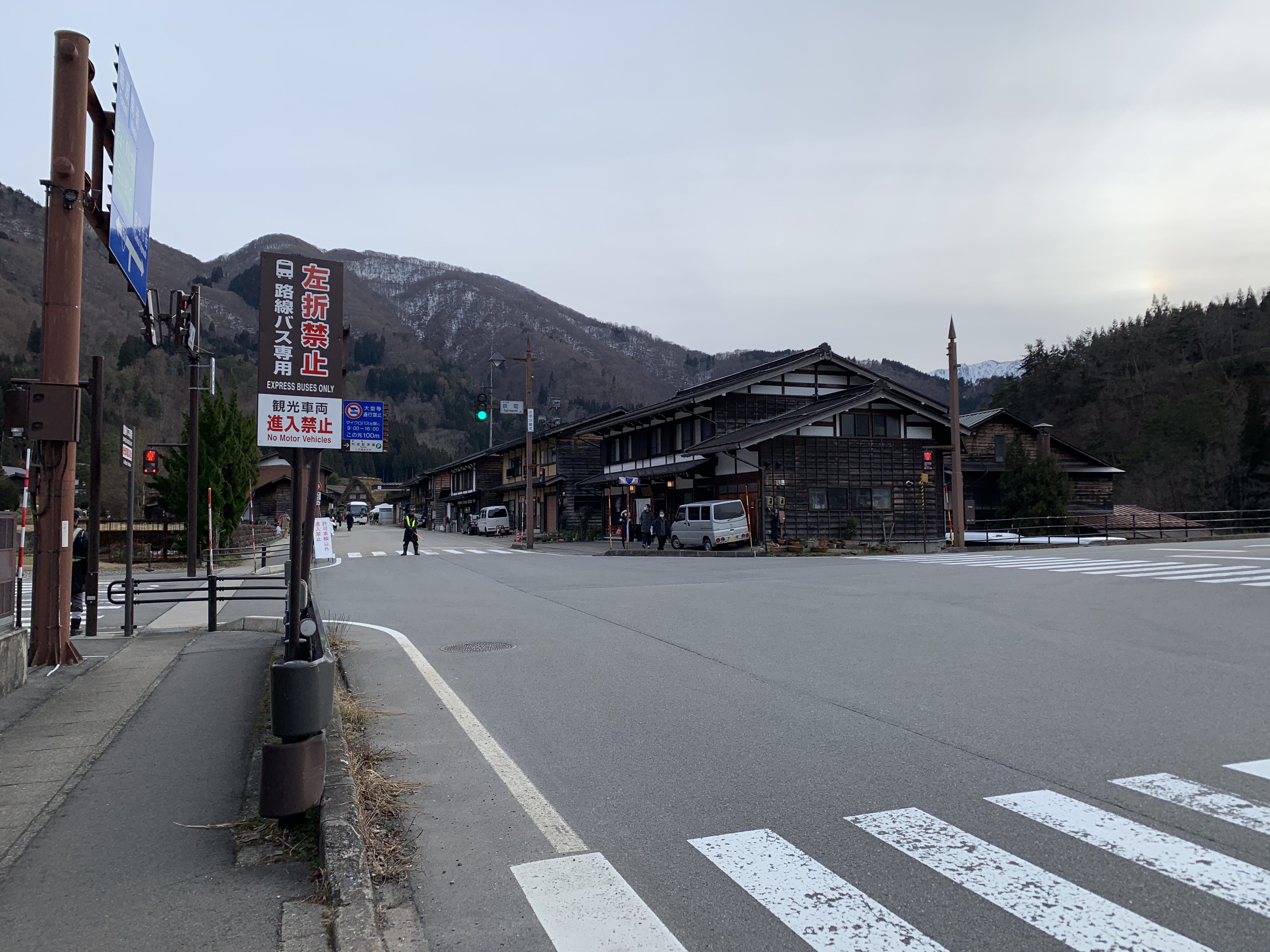
Ogimachi Intersection

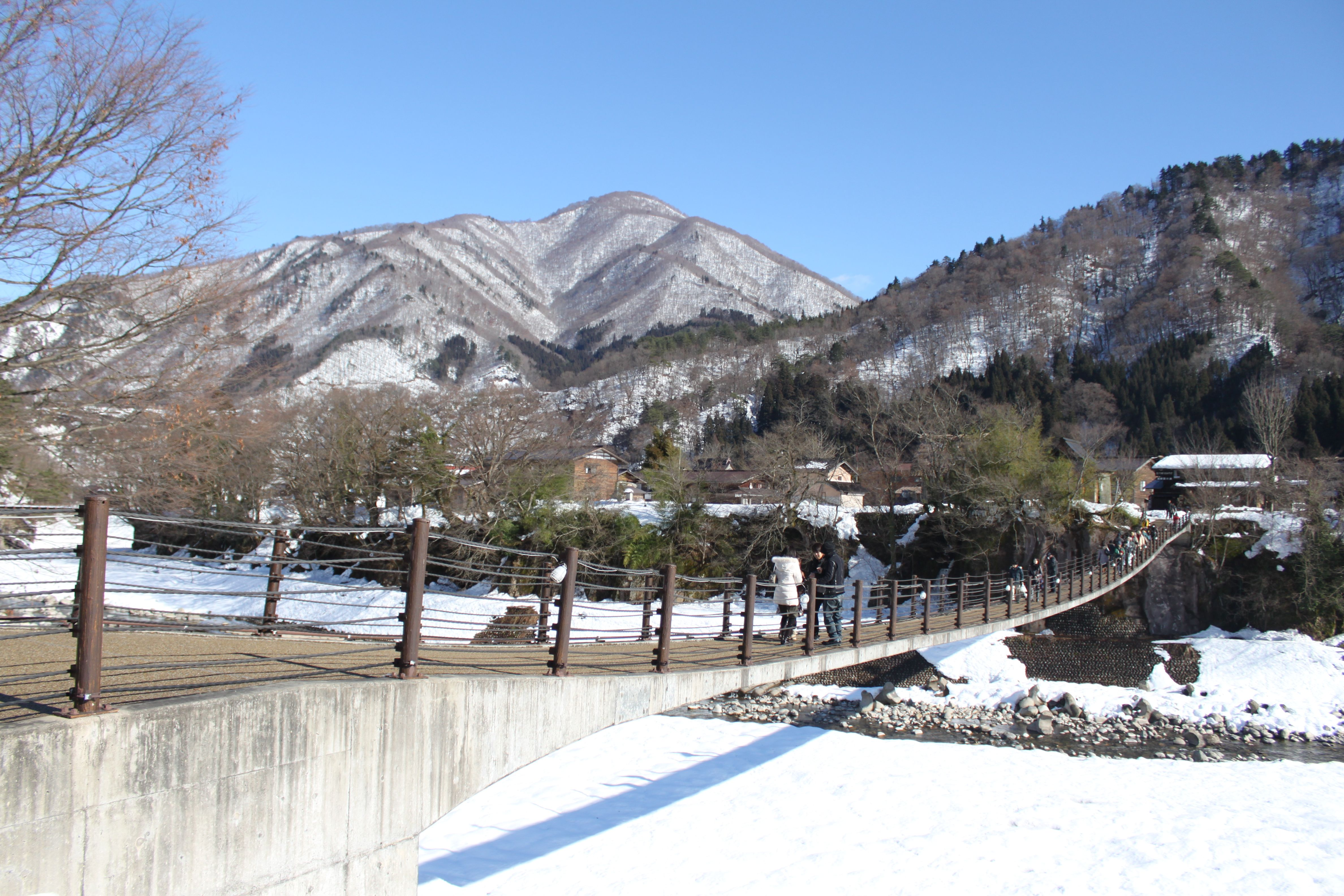
Deai Bridge

== History ==
- 23 December 2013 - At a regularly held village assembly, it was determined there was a demand by Shirakawa-gō residents for a restriction on privately owned vehicles in the thatch-roofed village as well as the establishment of a bus station.
- 2016
  - 21 June - Ordinance on the Establishment and Management of the Shirakawa-gō Bus Terminal issued.
  - 29 September - Ceremony marking completion of the bus station.
  - 1 October - Start of operations.
- 7 October 2017 - Currency exchange kiosk first put into use.
- 5 November–10 December 2018 - Higurashi When They Cry Shirakawa-gō Stamp Rally hosted in the village with the bus station one location for a stamp and gifts.
- 2–6 May 2020 - All buses to and from the Shirakawa-gō Bus Terminal were suspended on request of the village to limit the spread of COVID-19.
- On 20 February 2023, Shirakawa-gō Bus Terminal has resumed partial operation.

== Facilities ==
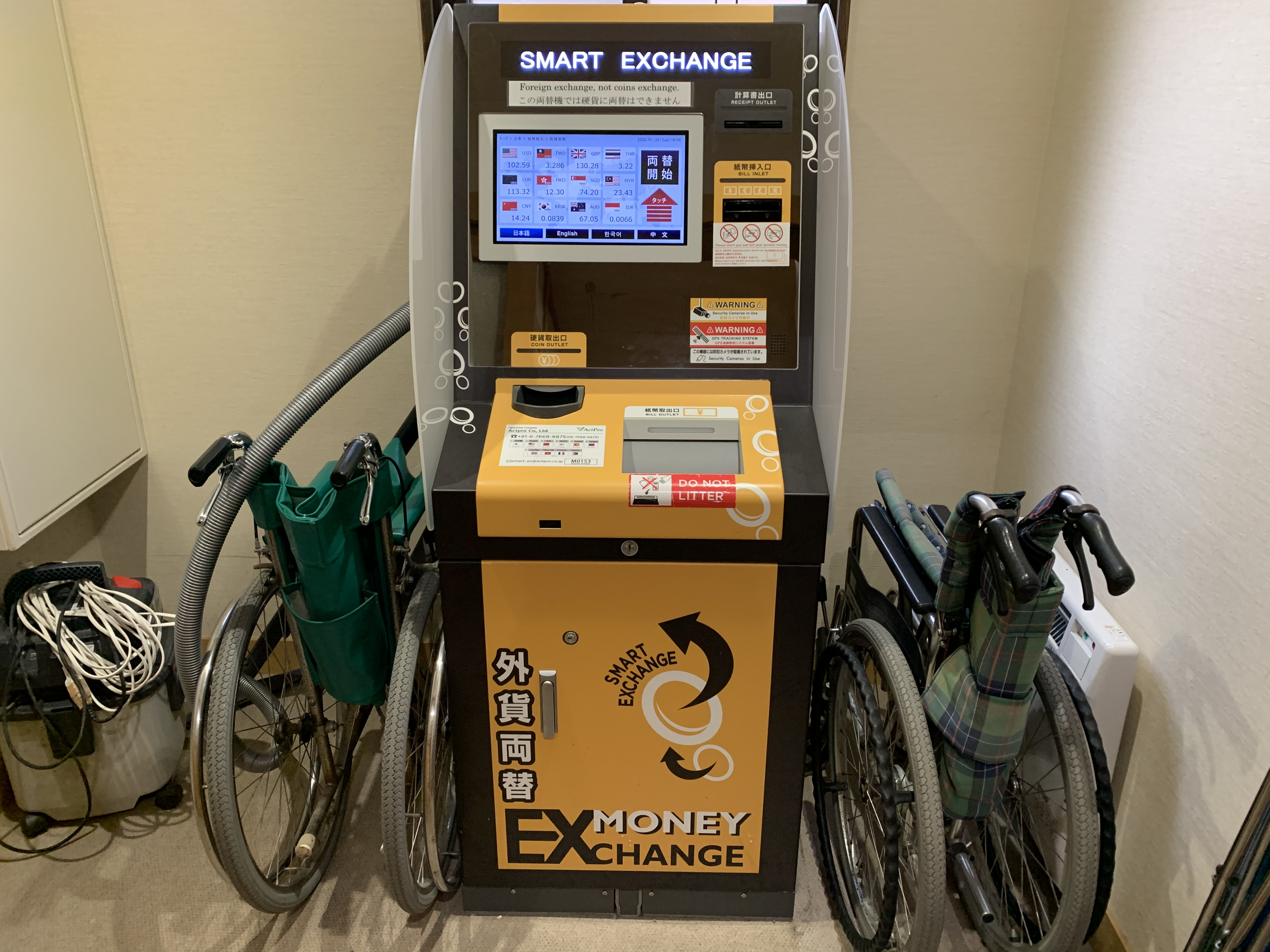
Currency exchange kiosk

The bus terminal is located near the Ogimachi crossroad. A one-storey administration building is located in the center, and the station offers the following facilities:

- Waiting room
- Toilet
- Currency exchange kiosk (capable of exchanging currency from 12 countries into Japanese yen)
- Tourist information desk and bus ticketing desk
- Coin lockers
- Wi-Fi

There are three bays for buses located around the administration building. It also has seven bays for buses to park when out of service, and two accessible parking spots.

== Highway and limited express, route Buses ==
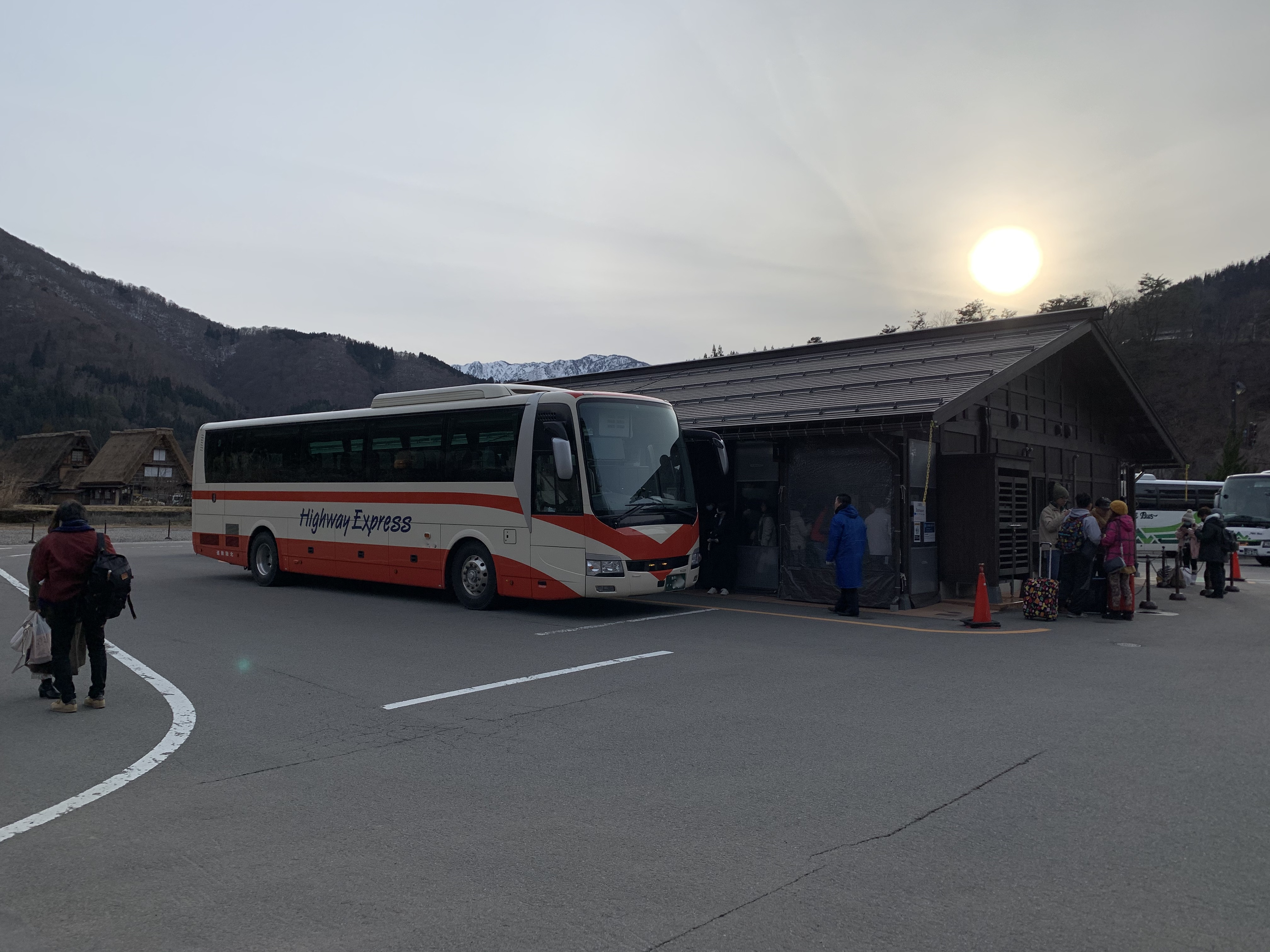
Expressway buses

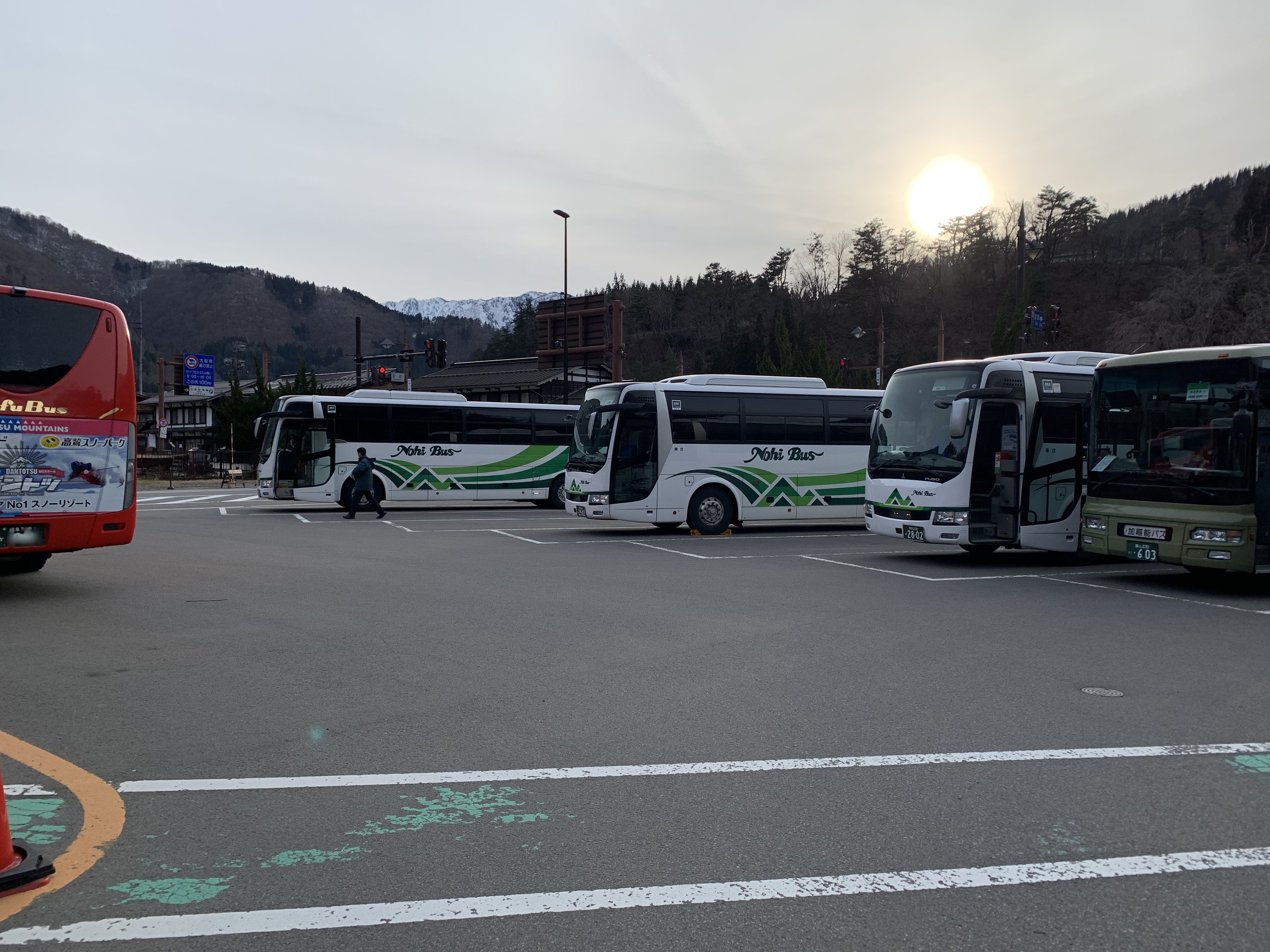
Assorted buses

Bay	Name	Via	Terminal	Company	Note
1	Expressway Bus Kanazawa Line	Gokayama	Kanazawa Station	Hokuriku Railway, Nohi Bus	
1	Expressway Bus Toyama Line	Toyama Airport	Toyama Station	Nohi Bus, Toyama Chihō Railway	
1	Expressway Bus Takaoka Line	Tonami Station, Shin-Takaoka Station	Takaoka Station (Toyama)	Iruka Kotsu, Nohi Bus, Kaetsunō Bus	
1	World Heritage Site Bus	Gokayama, Johana Station	Takaoka Station (Toyama)	Kaetsunō Bus	
2	Expressway Bus Nagoya Line	Gujō-Hachiman Station	Nagoya Station	Gifu Bus	Passengers are able to transfer onto an expressway bus bound for Gifu Station at Seki bus stop and discounted fares are available to Gifu Station.
2	Limited express Bus Shirakawago Line	Hirase Onsen	Maki	Gifu Bus	
2	Hirase・Shirakawago Line		Hirase Onsen	Hakusan Taxi	
3	Expressway Bus Kanazawa-Takaoka-Shirakawago Line	Non Stop	Takayama Station	Iruka Kotsu, Nohi Bus, Kaetsunō Bus, Toyama Chihō Railway, Hokuriku Railway	
3	Limited express Bus Shirakawago Line	Hatoya	Takayama Station	Nohi Bus	
3	Limited express Bus Gero Line	Takayama Station	Gero Station	Nohi Bus	

== Collab Events ==
A stamp rally was held in Shirakawa-gō from 5 November to 10 December 2018 in collaboration with the makers of the video game Higurashi When They Cry. The bus station was one of the locations of stamps, as well as a site for gift pickup. This location was chosen because the Shirakawa Clinic formerly on the site was the model for the Irie Clinic from the Higurashi When They Cry franchise.

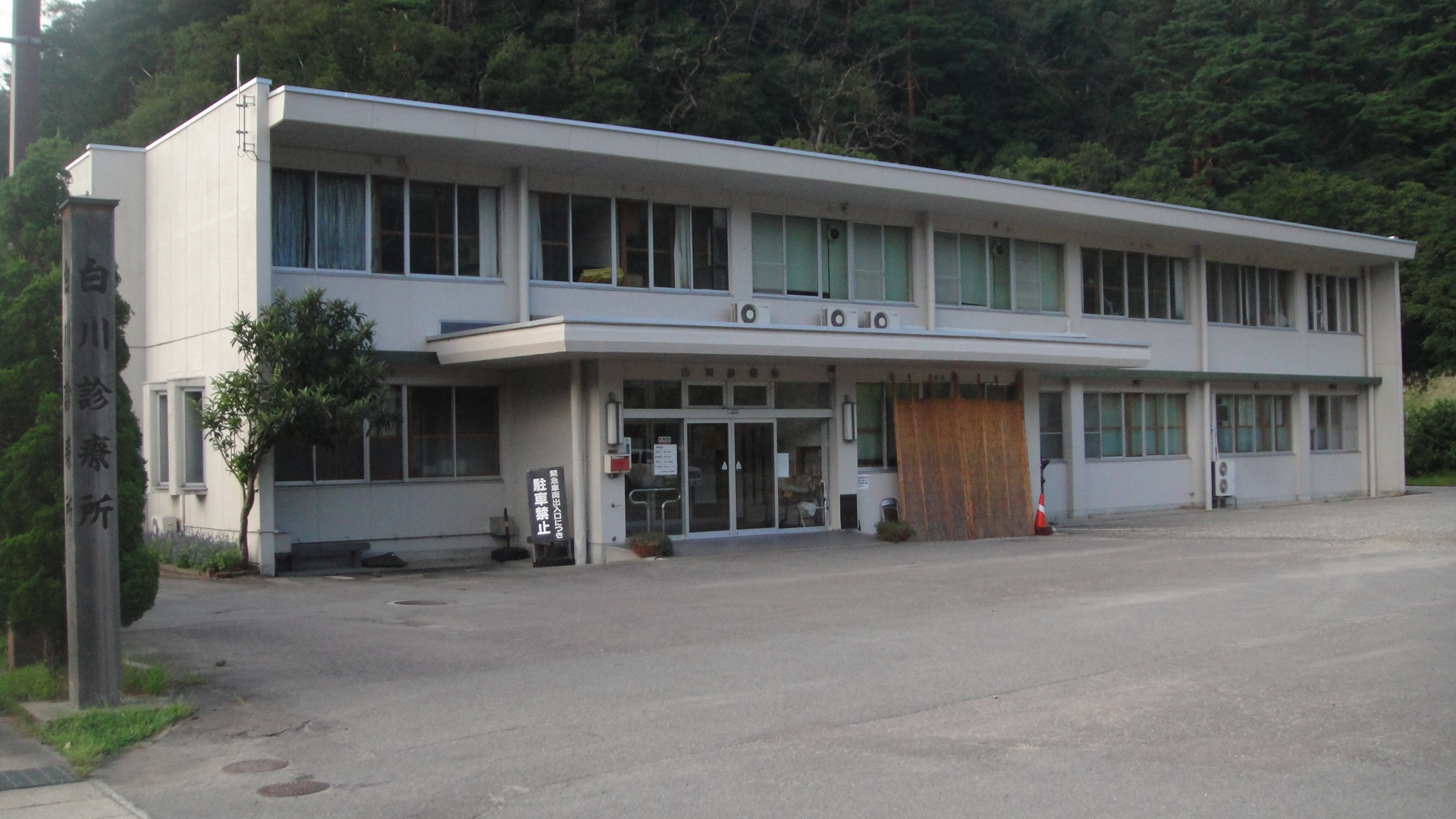
Former Shirakawa Clinic

== Surrounding areas ==
- Shirakawa-gō

== See also ==
- Historic Villages of Shirakawa-gō and Gokayama
- Shirakawa-gō
- Higurashi When They Cry
