= Gujō Odori =

Japanese festival

Gō Odori (郡上おどり) is a Bon Festival held every summer in Gujō, Gifu, Japan. The dance festival's origins have been traced back to the Kan'ei era (1624–44), when it is believed to have originated as an exercise in social cohesion; it has been designated an Important Intangible Folk Cultural Property.

== Dances ==
The festival lasts thirty-two nights, from the middle of July to early September. During the four days of Obon in mid-August (August 13 to 16), dances continue all night. Gujō Odori has 10 kinds of dances. Kawasaki and Harukoma are very famous and easy to dance for beginners. The final song of every night is always Matsusaka. Dancers dance in a circular motion around the center stage. All dances are traditional Japanese lines dances. There is no difference between the dancers and the audience, anyone can participate; therefore the dances attract many visitors. About 250,000 people during the four days of Obon and about 300,000 people every summer come to this small town, which has a population about 15,000 in Gujō Hachiman district, for the odori.

== See also ==
- List of Important Intangible Folk Cultural Properties
- Cultural Properties of Japan
