= Hachiman, Gifu =

Dissolved municipality in Gifu prefecture, Japan

Map of Hachiman, Gifu

Hachiman (八幡町, Hachiman-chō) was a town located in Gujō District, Gifu Prefecture, Japan.

== History ==
The town was established as a town in 1889.

On March 1, 2004, Hachiman, along with the towns of Shirotori and Yamato, and the villages of Meihō, Minami, Takasu and Wara (all from Gujō District), was merged to create the city of Gujō.
