= Shirotori, Gifu =

Dissolved municipality in Gifu prefecture, Japan

Map of Shirotori, Gifu

Shirotori (白鳥町, Shirotori-chō) was a town located in Gujō District, Gifu Prefecture, Japan.

== History ==
The village was established in 1889, and later was elevated as a town in 1928.

On March 1, 2004, Shirotori, along with the towns of Hachiman and Yamato, and the villages of Meihō, Minami, Takasu and Wara (all from Gujō District), was merged to create the city of Gujō.
