= Sakahogi =

Sakahogi 坂祝町
- Town
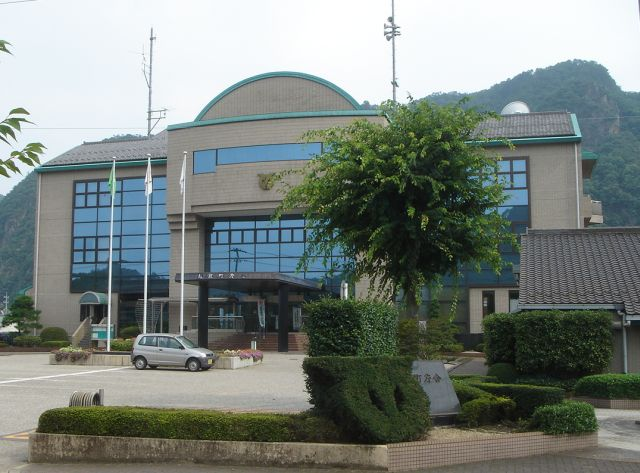
- Sakahogi Town Hall

- Flag Seal

- Location of Sakahogi in Gifu Prefecture

- Coordinates: 35°35′36.1″N 136°59′7.2″E
- Country: Japan
- Region: Chūbu
- Prefecture: Gifu
- District: Kamo

Government
  - Mayor: Muneyuki Minamiyama

Area
  - Total: 12.87 km^{2} (4.97 sq mi)

Population (January 1, 2019)
  - Total: 8,253
  - Density: 641.3/km^{2} (1,661/sq mi)
- Time zone: UTC+9 (Japan Standard Time)
- City symbols
- Tree: Nandina
- Flower: Salvia
- Phone number: 0574-26-7111
- Address: Torikumi 46-18, Sakahogi-Chō, Kamo-gun, Gifu-ken 505-8501
- Website: Official website (in Japanese)

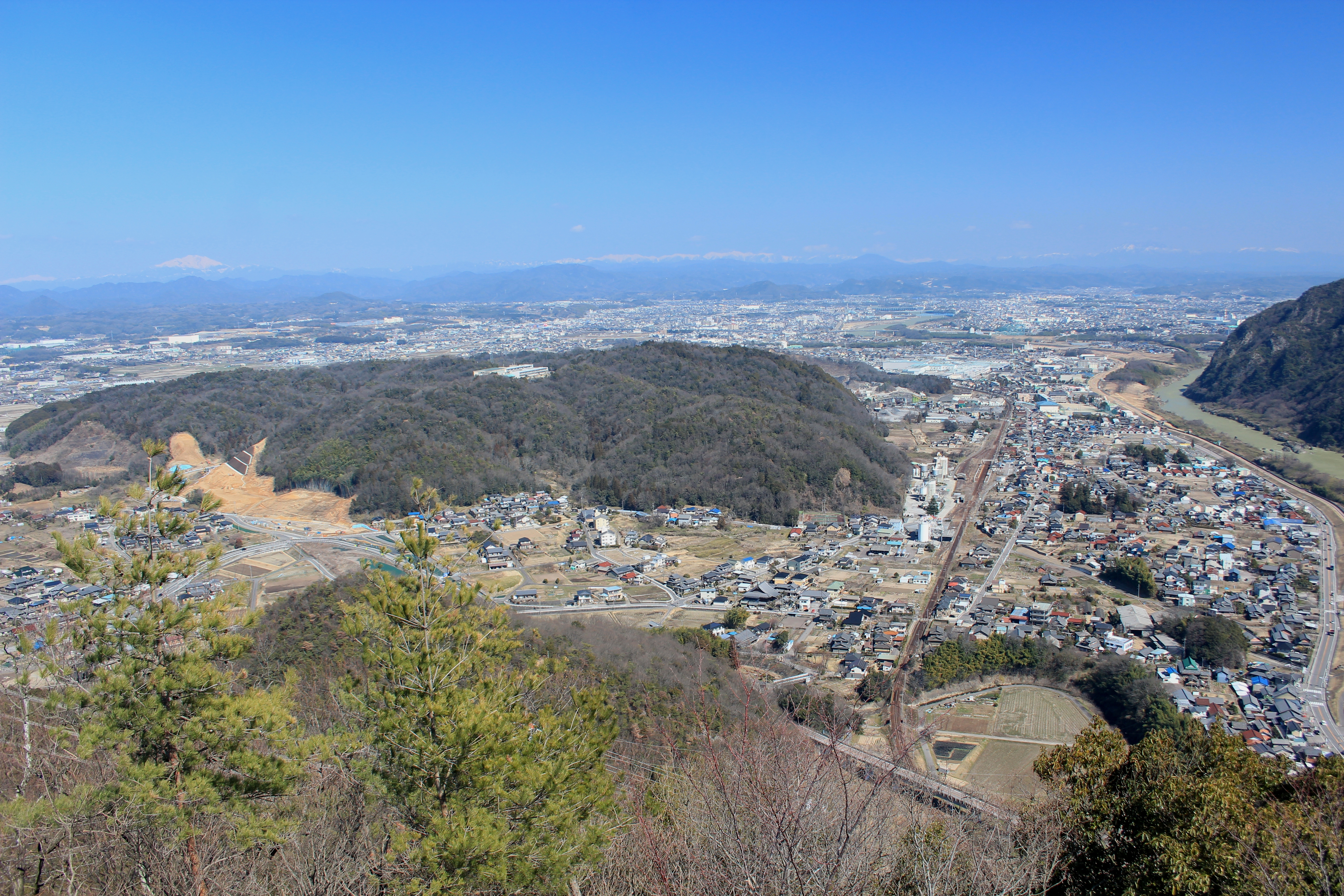
Panorama of Sakahogi

Sakahogi (坂祝町, Sakahogi-chō) is a town located in Kamo District, Gifu Prefecture, Japan. As of 1 January 2018, the town had an estimated population of 8,253 and a population density of 640 persons per km^{2}, in 3359 households. The total area of the town was 12.87 square kilometres (4.97 sq mi).

== Geography ==
Sakahogi is located on the edge of the Nōbi Plain in south-central Gifu Prefecture. The town has a climate characterized by hot and humid summers, and mild winters (Köppen climate classification Cfa). The average annual temperature in Sakahogi is 15.3 °C. The average annual rainfall is 1975 mm with September as the wettest month. The temperatures are highest on average in August, at around 27.9 °C, and lowest in January, at around 3.6 °C.

=== Neighbouring municipalities ===
- Aichi Prefecture
  - Inuyama
- Gifu Prefecture
  - Kakamigahara
  - Kani
  - Minokamo
  - Seki

== Demographics ==
Per Japanese census data, the population of Sakahogi has remained relatively steady over the past 30 years.

Historical population
Year	Pop.	±%
1970	5,393	—
1980	6,366	+18.0%
1990	8,722	+37.0%
2000	8,853	+1.5%
2010	8,361	−5.6%
2020	8,071	−3.5%

== History ==
The area around Sakahogi was part of traditional Mino Province. During the Edo period, it part of Kamo District, and was tenryō directly controlled by the Tokugawa shogunate. During the post-Meiji restoration cadastral reforms, the area was organised into Kamo District, Gifu Prefecture. The village of Sakahogi was formed on April 1, 1897, with the establishment of the modern municipalities system by the merger of the hamlets of Sakakura, Torikumi, Ōhari, Kuroiwa, Fukagaya, Katsuyama and Fukada. In 1950 the Fukada part of Sakahogi was merged into the town of Ōta, now a part of Minokamo. Sakahogi was raised to town status on October 1, 1968

== Economy ==
The local economy is dominated by Pajero Manufacturing Co. Ltd., a subsidiary of Mitsubishi Motors, which assembles the Mitsubishi Pajero, a sport utility vehicle, the Mitsubishi Delica, a minivan, and the Mitsubishi Outlander in Sakahogi.

== Education ==
Sakahogi has one public elementary schools and one public middle school operated by the town government. The town does not have a high school. The Nakanihon Automotive College is located in Sakahogi.

== Transportation ==
=== Railway ===
- Central Japan Railway Company - Takayama Main Line
  - Sakahogi

=== Highway ===
- National Route 21
- National Route 248
