= Sakahogi Station =

Railway station in Sakahogi, Gifu Prefecture, Japan

CG06 Sakahogi Station 坂祝駅
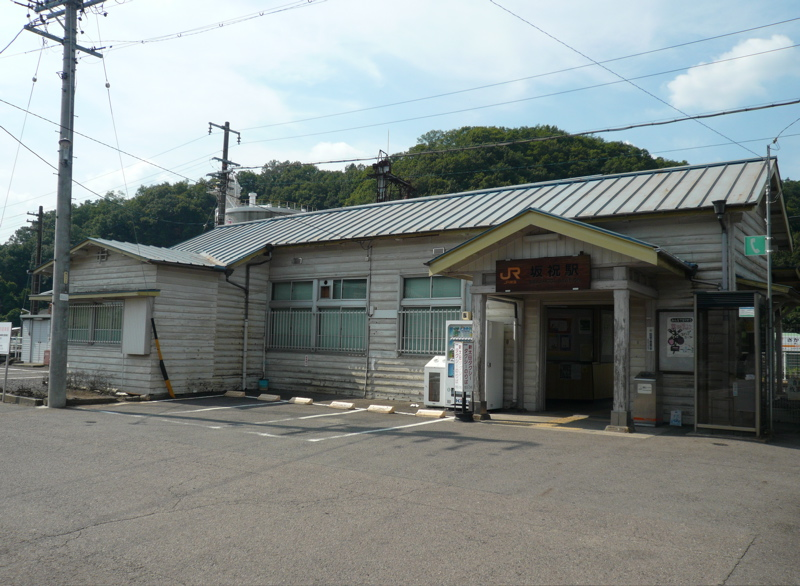
- Sakahogi Station in August 2008

General information
- Location: 363 Torikumi, Sakahoka-cho, Kamo-gun, Gifu-ken 505-0075; Japan
- Coordinates: 35.4264°N 136.9766°E
- Operator: JR Central
- Line: Takayama Main Line
- Distance: 22.5 km from Gifu
- Platforms: 2 side platforms
- Tracks: 2

Other information
- Status: Unstaffed
- Station code: CG06

History
- Opened: November 12, 1921; 104 years ago

Passengers
- FY2016: 411 daily
Location
- Location within Gifu Prefecture Location within Japan

Sakahogi Station (坂祝駅, Sakahogi-eki) is a railway station on the Takayama Main Line in the town of Sakahogi, Kamo District, Gifu Prefecture, Japan, operated by Central Japan Railway Company (JR Central).

== Lines ==
Sakahogi Station is served by the JR Central Takayama Main Line, and is located 22.5 kilometers from the official starting point of the line at Gifu.

== Station layout ==
Sakahogi Station has two opposed ground-level side platforms connected by a footbridge. The station is unattended.

=== Platforms ===
1	■ Takayama Main Line	for Gifu and Nagoya
2	■ Takayama Main Line	for Mino-Ōta and Takayama

== Adjacent stations ==
«	Service	»
Takayama Main Line
Limited Express "Hida": Does not stop at this station
Unuma	Local	Mino-Ōta

== History ==
Sakahogi Station opened on November 12, 1921. The station was absorbed into the JR Central network upon the privatization of Japanese National Railways (JNR) on April 1, 1987.

== Passenger statistics ==
In fiscal 2016, the station was used by an average of 411 passengers daily (boarding passengers only).

== Surrounding area ==
- Sakahogi Town Hall

== See also ==
- List of railway stations in Japan
