= Itadori River =

River in Gifu Prefecture, Japan

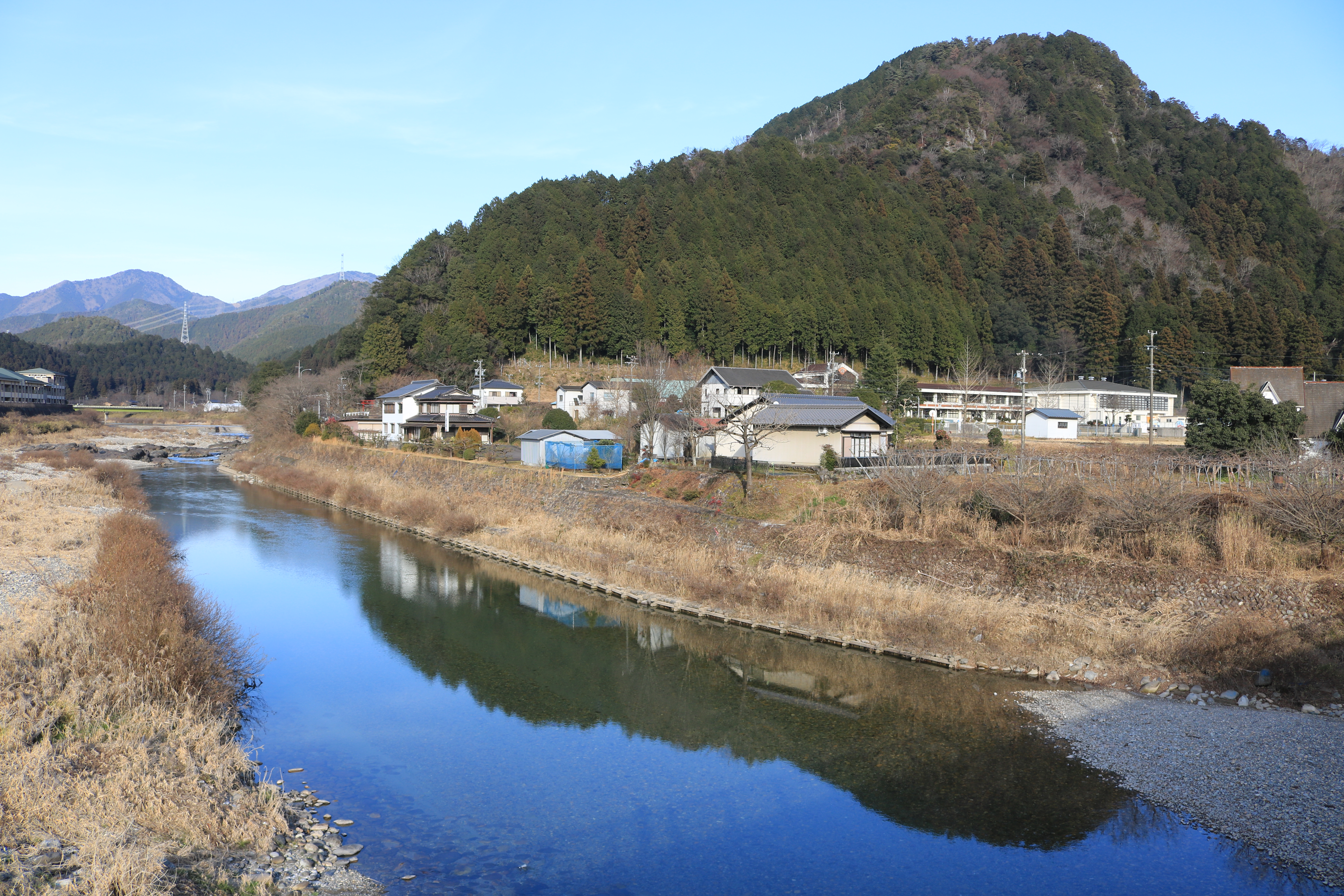
- Itadori River from Horado Bridge

- Location within Japan
- Native name: 板取川 (Japanese)

Location
- Country: Japan

Physical characteristics
- Source
  - location: Samondake (左門岳)
  - elevation: 1,224 m (4,016 ft)
- Mouth
  - location: Nagara River
- Length: 53 km (33 mi)
- Discharge
  - average: 313 m^{3}/s (11,100 cu ft/s)

Basin features
- River system: Kiso River

The Itadori River (板取川, Itadori-gawa) is a river in Japan which flows through Gifu Prefecture. It is part of the Kiso River system.

== History ==
Taguchi Castle (田口城 Taguchi Shiro) was built in 1540 by the Nagaya clan. However, it was destroyed in 1594, when they were beaten by Satō Katamasa in battle.

== River communities ==
The Itadori river flows through Seki and Mino in Gifu Prefecture.
