= Minami, Gifu =

Dissolved municipality in Gifu prefecture, Japan

Map of Minami, Gifu

Minami (美並村, Minami-mura) was a village located in Gujō District, Gifu Prefecture, Japan.

== History ==
The village was established in 1954.

On March 1, 2004, Minami, along with the towns of Hachiman, Shirotori and Yamato, and the villages of Meihō, Takasu and Wara (all from Gujō District), was merged to create the city of Gujō.
