= Nakanihon Automotive College =

Coordinates: 35°26′41.5″N 136°58′9.2″E

- 中日本自動車短期大学
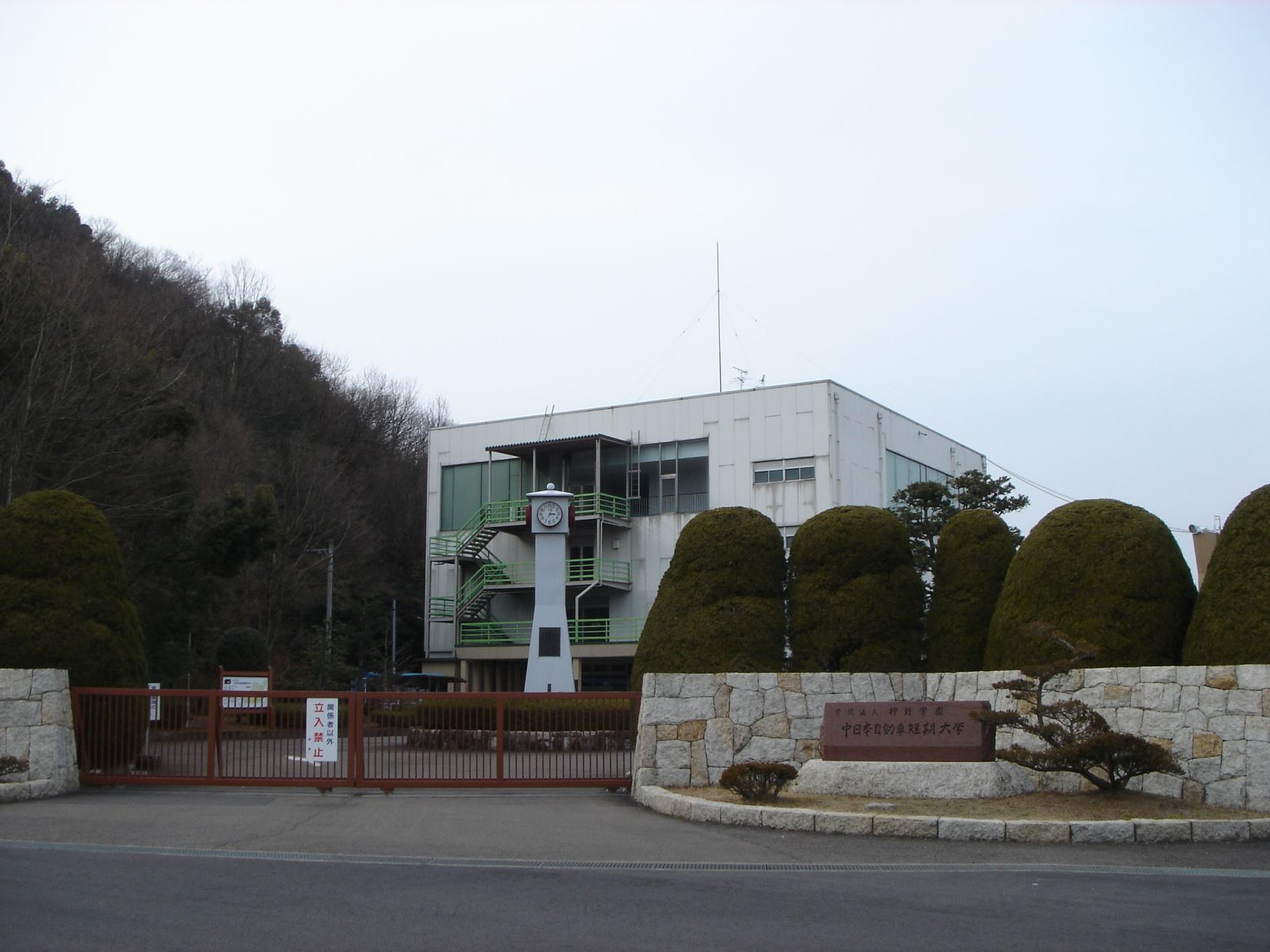
- Nakanihon Automotive College
- Type: Private
- Established: 1967
- Location: Sakahogi, Gifu, Japan
- Website: http://www.nakanihon.ac.jp/

Nakanihon Automotive College (中日本自動車短期大学, Naka-nihon jidōsha tanki daigaku), NAC, is a private junior college in Sakahogi, Gifu, Japan, established in 1967. Over 90% of the students are male.
