= Mino, Gifu =

Mino 美濃市
- City
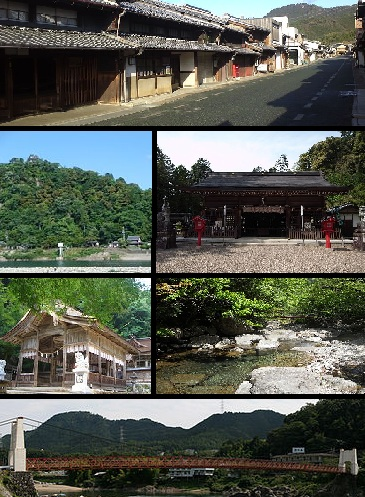
- Mino-machi; Nagara River, Hachiman Shrine; Oyada Shrine, Katachi Gorge; Mino Bridge

- Flag Seal

- Location of Mino in Gifu Prefecture

- Coordinates: 35°32′41.1″N 136°54′27.2″E
- Country: Japan
- Region: Chūbu
- Prefecture: Gifu
- Town settled date: July 1, 1889 (As Kamiraichi town)
- Citry Settled date: April 1, 1954

Government
  - Mayor: Keisuke Shinode (篠田啓介) - from November 2025

Area
  - Total: 117.01 km^{2} (45.18 sq mi)

Population (December 31, 2018)
  - Total: 20,749
  - Density: 177.33/km^{2} (459.27/sq mi)
- Time zone: UTC+9 (Japan Standard Time)
- Phone number: 0575-33-1122
- Address: 1350 Mino-shi, Gifu-ken 501-3792
- Climate: Cfa
- Website: Official website
- Symbols
- Flower: Ume
- Tree: Maple

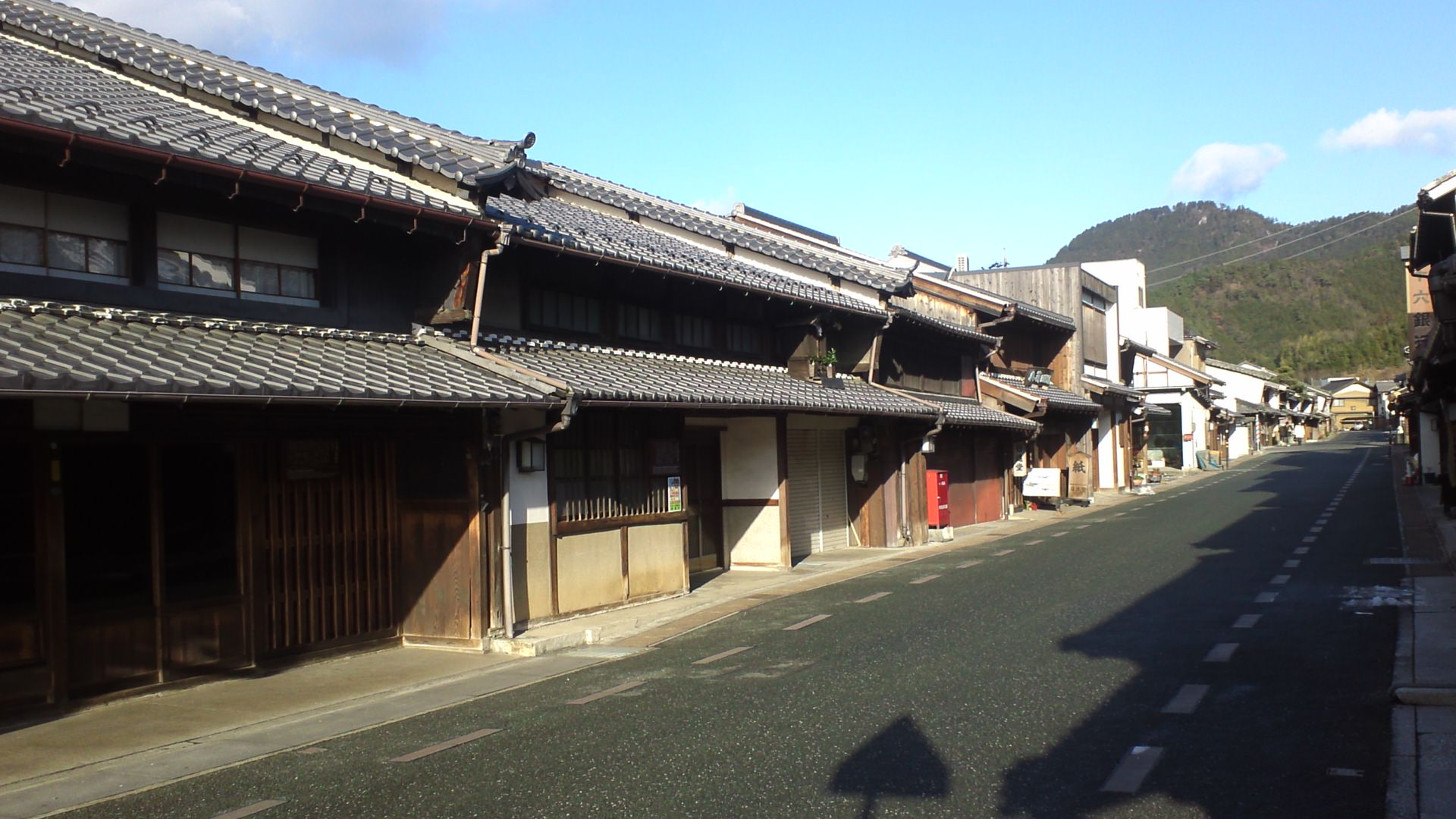
Mino Udatsu Townscape

Mino (美濃市, Mino-shi; Japanese pronunciation: [mʲí.nò̞, mʲì.nó̞(.ɕì)]) is a city located in Gifu, Japan. As of 31 December 2018, the city had an estimated population of 20,749 in 8149 households, and a population density of 180 persons per km^{2}. The total area of the city was 117.01 square kilometres (45.18 sq mi). The city is renowned for traditional Japanese Mino washi paper and its streets, which are in the style of the early Edo period (1603–1868). An urban area known as "Udatsu Townscape" (うだつのあがるまちなみ) was designated as an important traditional building group conservation area by the government on May 13, 1999.

== Geography ==
Mino is located in the south-central Gifu Prefecture. The Nagara River and the Itadori River flow through the city. Mino is surrounded by the city of Seki to the west, south and east, and by the city of Gujō to the north.

=== Neighbouring municipalities ===
- Gifu Prefecture
  - Gujō
  - Seki

== Climate ==
The city has a climate characterized by hot and humid summers, and mild winters (Köppen climate classification Cfa). The average annual temperature in Mino is 14.8 °C (58.6 °F). The average annual rainfall is 2,207.8 mm (86.92 in) with July as the wettest month. The temperatures are highest on average in August, at around 26.9 °C (80.4 °F), and lowest in January, at around 3.2 °C (37.8 °F).

Climate data for Mino (elevation 68 m, 1991–2020 normals, extremes 1978–present)
Month	Jan	Feb	Mar	Apr	May	Jun	Jul	Aug	Sep	Oct	Nov	Dec	Year
Record high °C (°F)	16.8 (62.2)	21.7 (71.1)	25.3 (77.5)	30.1 (86.2)	34.4 (93.9)	39.1 (102.4)	40.6 (105.1)	41.0 (105.8)	38.2 (100.8)	33.1 (91.6)	26.5 (79.7)	21.5 (70.7)	41.0 (105.8)
Mean daily maximum °C (°F)	8.5 (47.3)	9.8 (49.6)	14.0 (57.2)	19.9 (67.8)	24.8 (76.6)	27.7 (81.9)	31.3 (88.3)	33.2 (91.8)	28.9 (84.0)	23.2 (73.8)	16.9 (62.4)	10.9 (51.6)	20.8 (69.4)
Daily mean °C (°F)	3.2 (37.8)	4.0 (39.2)	7.7 (45.9)	13.3 (55.9)	18.3 (64.9)	22.0 (71.6)	25.7 (78.3)	26.9 (80.4)	23.1 (73.6)	17.2 (63.0)	11.1 (52.0)	5.6 (42.1)	14.8 (58.6)
Mean daily minimum °C (°F)	−0.8 (30.6)	−0.7 (30.7)	2.3 (36.1)	7.5 (45.5)	12.8 (55.0)	17.6 (63.7)	21.8 (71.2)	22.8 (73.0)	19.1 (66.4)	12.9 (55.2)	6.7 (44.1)	1.5 (34.7)	10.3 (50.5)
Record low °C (°F)	−7.4 (18.7)	−7.9 (17.8)	−4.6 (23.7)	−1.9 (28.6)	2.7 (36.9)	9.2 (48.6)	14.6 (58.3)	15.2 (59.4)	8.7 (47.7)	2.4 (36.3)	−1.6 (29.1)	−7.7 (18.1)	−7.9 (17.8)
Average precipitation mm (inches)	78.7 (3.10)	83.0 (3.27)	150.8 (5.94)	187.8 (7.39)	212.2 (8.35)	260.6 (10.26)	348.7 (13.73)	267.3 (10.52)	284.8 (11.21)	170.4 (6.71)	105.2 (4.14)	89.8 (3.54)	2,207.8 (86.92)
Average precipitation days (≥ 1.0 mm)	9.5	8.8	9.9	10.3	10.8	13.3	14.5	11.5	12.6	9.6	8.4	10.1	129.0
Mean monthly sunshine hours	159.3	170.9	196.9	205.9	207.6	158.8	164.8	203.5	165.3	172.7	159.1	151.3	2,115.4
Source: Japan Meteorological Agency (1991–2020 normals, extremes 1978–present)

== Demographics ==
Per Japanese census data, the population of Mino has decreased gradually over the past 40 years.

Historical population
Year	Pop.	±%
1970	26,421	—
1980	26,825	+1.5%
1990	26,022	−3.0%
2000	24,662	−5.2%
2010	22,629	−8.2%
2020	19,247	−14.9%

== History ==
The area around Mino was part of the traditional Mino Province. During the Edo period, Kanamori Nagachika, the founder of Takayama Domain was granted permission by Tokugawa Ieyasu to build Oguriyama Castle on the Nagara River. Due to floods, the castle town was relocated in 1605 to higher ground. The area later became part of the holdings of Owari Domain under the Tokugawa shogunate. In the post-Meiji restoration cadastral reforms, Mugi District in Gifu Prefecture was created, and with the establishment of the modern municipalities system on July 1, 1889, the town of Kozuchi was created. In July 1909 Kozuchi was the site of a meteorite impact. The meteorite, which massed about 13.5 kg (30 lb), broke into pieces and fell across an area 13 miles (21 km) long and 5 miles (8.0 km) wide. The largest piece, about 4 kg (8.8 lb), fell in the village of Gokurakuji. On April 1, 1911, Kozuchi was renamed Mino. Mino was raised to city status on April 1, 1954, with the merger of the town of Mino with the villages of Suhara, Shimomaki, Kamimaki, Oyada, Aimi, and Nakauchi.

== Government ==
Mino has a mayor-council form of government with a directly elected mayor and a unicameral city legislature of 13 members.

== Education ==
Mino has five public elementary schools and two public middle schools operated by the city government. The city has one public high school operated by the Gifu Prefectural Board of Education.

== Transportation ==
=== Railway ===
- - Nagaragawa Railway Etsumi-Nan Line
  - Matsumori - Minoshi - Umeyama - Yunohora-Onsenguchi - Suhara

=== Highway ===
- Tōkai-Hokuriku Expressway
- Tōkai-Kanjō Expressway
- National Route 156

== Sister cities ==
- Meinong District, Kaohsiung, Taiwan, friendship city since November 29, 2012

== Local attractions ==
- Ogurayama Castle Ruins
- Yawata Shrine

== Notable people from Mino ==
- Chiune Sugihara, diplomat
