= Wara, Gifu =

Dissolved municipality in Gifu prefecture, Japan

Map of Wara, Gifu

Wara (和良村, Wara-mura) was a village located in Gujō District, Gifu Prefecture, Japan.

== History ==
The village was established in 1894.

On March 1, 2004, Wara, along with the towns of Hachiman, Shirotori and Yamato, and the villages of Meihō, Minami and Takasu (all from Gujō District), was merged to create the city of Gujō.
