= Yamato, Gifu =

Dissolved municipality in Gifu prefecture, Japan

Map of Yamato, Gifu

Yamato (大和町, Yamato-chō) was a town located in Gujō District, Gifu Prefecture, Japan.

== History ==
The town was established as a village in 1955, and later was elevated as a town in 1985.

On March 1, 2004, Yamato, along with the towns of Hachiman and Shirotori, and the villages of Meihō, Minami, Takasu and Wara (all from Gujō District), was merged to create the city of Gujō.
