= Meihō, Gifu =

Dissolved municipality in Gifu prefecture, Japan

Map of Meihō, Gifu

Meihō (明宝村, Meihō-mura) was a village located in Gujō District, Gifu Prefecture, Japan.

== History ==
The village was established as Okumyōgata (奥明方村) in 1897, changed the name to Myōgata (明方村) in 1970 and changed the name to Meihō (明宝村) in 1992.

On March 1, 2004, Meihō, along with the towns of Hachiman, Shirotori and Yamato, and the villages of Minami, Takasu and Wara (all from Gujō District), was merged to create the city of Gujō.
