= Etsumi-Nan Line =

Railway line in Gifu Prefecture, Japan

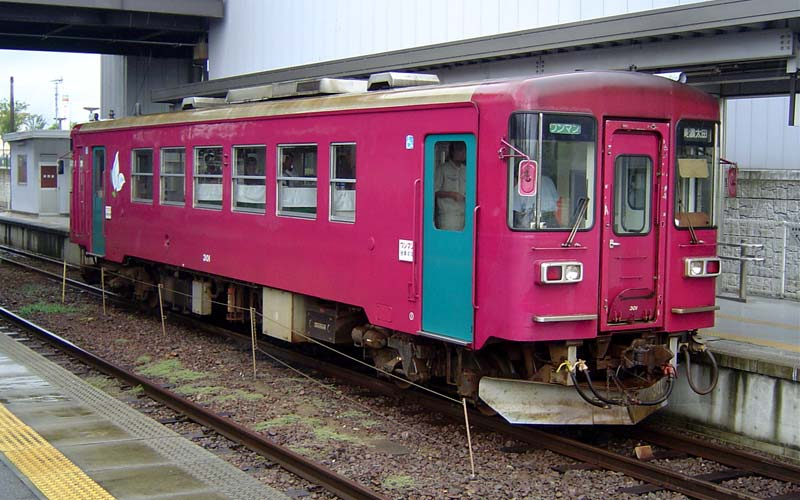
- A Nagaragawa Railway Nagara 3 series train

Overview
- Native name: 越美南線
- Status: Operational
- Owner: Nagaragawa Railway
- Locale: Gifu Prefecture, Japan
- Termini: Mino-Ōta; Hokunō
- Stations: 38

Service
- Type: Heavy rail
- Operator(s): Nagaragawa Railway
- Rolling stock: Nagaragawa Railway Nagara 2 Series DMU, Nagaragawa Railway Nagara 3 Series DMU, Nagaragawa Railway Nagara 500 Series DMU

History
- Opened: 5 October 1923; 102 years ago
- Last extension: 1934

Technical
- Line length: 72.1 km (44.8 mi)
- Number of tracks: Entire line single tracked
- Character: Rural
- Track gauge: 1,067 mm (3 ft 6 in)
- Electrification: Not electrified
- Operating speed: 80 km/h (50 mph)
Route map
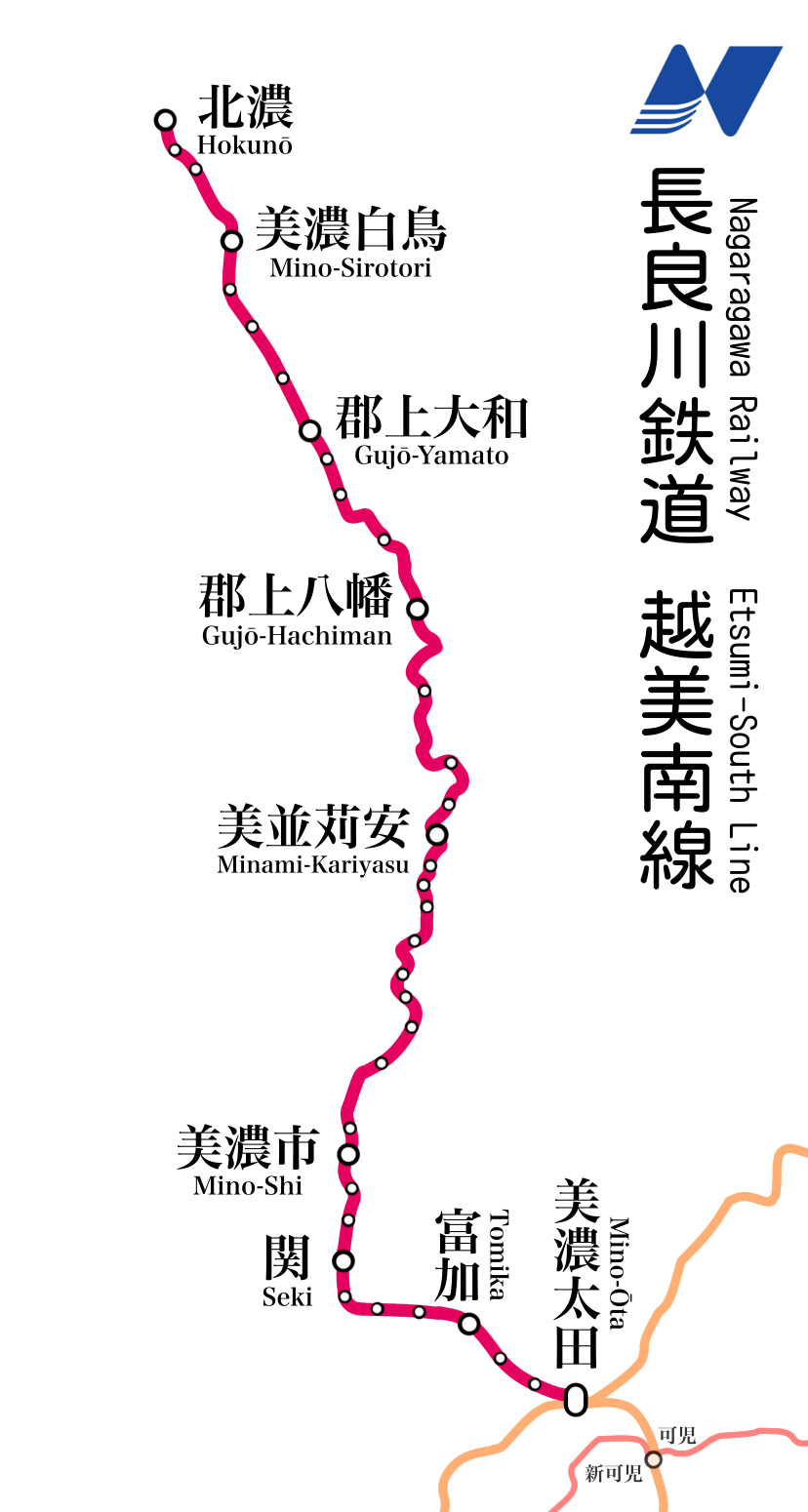

The Etsumi-Nan Line (越美南線, Etsumi Nan-sen; "Etsumi South Line") is a railway line in Gifu Prefecture, Japan, operated by the third-sector operator Nagaragawa Railway (長良川鉄道, Nagaragawa Tetsudō). The line connects Mino-Ōta Station in Minokamo with Hokunō Station in Gujō. It is the only railway line operated by Nagaragawa Railway, and was originally operated by Japanese National Railways (JNR).

== History ==
=== Under JNR ownership ===
The original goal of Japanese National Railways (JNR) was to build a railway line to the Sea of Japan northward through the Nagara River valley. However, due to the resource requirements of the First World War and the Pacific War, this objective was never achieved and only 72.1 km (44.8 mi) was ever built. The first section to open was between Mino-Ōta and Minoshi on 5 October 1923. The JNR then proceeded to extend the line progressively northwards until it reached Hokunō in 1934. Although a ¼-mile section of track was laid beyond Hokunō, no further construction on the line was ever undertaken. Infill stations were constructed and opened, such as Yasaka, Fukuno, Akaike, Kamono and Sekiguchi in 1952. Manba, Tokunaga, Ōshima and Shirotori-kōgen stations opened in 1955. Suhara station opened in 1957. Freight services ceased in 1974. JNR planned to connect the Etsumi-Nan Line and Etsumi-Hoku Line ("Etsumi North Line"), but the plan was never realized. The line was listed for closure as one of the Specified local lines in 1984, but it was decided that the line be transferred to a third-sector company instead of being closed in 1986. The line was transferred to the Nagaragawa Railway on December 11 of that year.

=== Under Nagaragawa Railway ownership ===
Upon the transferring of the line to the Nagaragawa Railway, many stations were renamed or newly opened.

- Maehira-Koen, Seki-Tomioka, Sekiterasu-mae, Seki-shimouchi, Konno, Shizenen-mae station were opened on December 11, 1986.
- Kamono, Tomika, Seki, Yonoharaonsenguchi, Suhara, Hanno, Ōya, Fukuno, Minami-Kariyasu, Akaike, Aioi, Yamada, Gujyō-Yamato station were renamed to their current name on the same date.

Infill stations continued to open, with Kami-mamba and Umeyama stations opening on 21 September 1987, Hakusan-nagataki station opening on 6 August 1988, Sekishiyakusho-mae and Matsumori opening on 1 April 1999, and Minami-kodakara-onsen station opening on 4 April 2002. Trolley cars ran from 1992 to 2003, when an accident occurred forcing the service to be abolished.

Beginning in spring 2016, two of the line's Nagara 300 series diesel cars were rebuilt as the Nagara sightseeing train. The rebuilding work on the two cars was overseen Don Design Associates, headed by industrial designer Eiji Mitooka.

The picturesque line is now popular with visitors and tourists. Beginning in April 2016, a two-car sightseeing train Nagara (ながら), which was created by industrial designer Eiji Mitooka, runs weekly services between Mino-Ota and Hokunō. Passengers are served a selection of bento dishes created from locally sourced seasonal ingredients from Gifu Prefecture.

== Infrastructure ==
=== Rolling stock ===
The line uses Nagaragawa Railway Nagara 300 series, Nagaragawa Railway Nagara 500 series, and Nagaragawa Railway Nagara 600 series. All three series are diesel multiple units. The 300 series were manufactured by Fuji Heavy Industries, while the 500 series and the 600 series were manufactured by Niigata Transys. The 300 series trains are assigned a number from 301 to 307, although the train assigned the number 303 and 305 no longer exists.

=== Stations ===
All stations are located in Gifu Prefecture. Seki Station used to connect with Meitetsu Minomachi Line before its closure.

No.	Image	Station	Japanese	Distance (km)		"Nagara" service	Transfers	Location
No.	Image	Station	Japanese	Between stations	Total	"Nagara" service	Transfers	Location
0		Mino-Ōta	美濃太田	-	0.0	●	Taita Line; Takayama Main Line	Minokamo
1		Maehira-Kōen	前平公園	1.7	1.7			Minokamo
2		Kamono	加茂野	2.0	3.7			Minokamo
3		Tomika	富加	2.2	5.9	●		Tomika, Kamo District
4		Seki-Tomioka	関富岡	2.3	8.2			Seki
5		Seki-guchi	関口	1.5	9.7			Seki
6		Sekiterasumae	せきてらす前	1.5	11.2			Seki
7		Seki	関	0.8	12.0	●		Seki
8		Seki-Shiyakusho-mae	関市役所前	1.0	13.0			Seki
9		Seki-Shimouchi	関下有知	1.6	14.6			Seki
10		Matsumori	松森	1.5	16.1			Mino
11		Minoshi	美濃市	1.6	17.7	●		Mino
12		Umeyama	梅山	1.1	18.8			Mino
13		Yunohora-Onsen-guchi	湯の洞温泉口	3.5	22.3			Mino
14		Suhara	洲原	2.4	24.7			Mino
15		Hanno	母野	1.4	26.1			Gujō
16		Konno	木尾	1.2	27.3			Gujō
17		Yasaka	八坂	2.1	29.4			Gujō
18		Minami-Kodakara-Onsen	みなみ子宝温泉	1.2	30.6			Gujō
19		Ōya	大矢	1.2	31.8			Gujō
20		Fukuno	福野	1.1	32.9			Gujō
21		Minami-Kariyasu	美並苅安	1.9	34.8			Gujō
22		Akaike	赤池	1.5	36.3			Gujō
23		Fukado	深戸	2.2	38.5			Gujō
24		Aioi	相生	4.5	43.0			Gujō
25		Gujō-Hachiman	郡上八幡	3.9	46.9	●		Gujō
26		Shizenen-mae	自然園前	4.0	50.9			Gujō
27		Yamada	山田	3.1	54.0			Gujō
28		Tokunaga	徳永	1.9	55.9			Gujō
29		Gujō-Yamato	郡上大和	1.4	57.3	●		Gujō
30		Mamba	万場	2.4	59.7			Gujō
31		Kami-Mamba	上万場	1.4	61.1			Gujō
32		Ōnaka	大中	1.3	62.4			Gujō
33		Ōshima	大島	1.9	64.3			Gujō
34		Mino-Shirotori	美濃白鳥	1.8	66.1	●		Gujō
35		Shirotori-Kōgen	白鳥高原	3.5	69.6			Gujō
36		Hakusan-Nagataki	白山長滝	1.3	70.9	●		Gujō
37		Hokunō	北濃	1.2	72.1	●		Gujō

== See also ==
- List of railway companies in Japan
- List of railway lines in Japan
