= Takasu, Gifu =

Dissolved municipality in Gifu prefecture, Japan

Map of Takasu, Gifu

Takasu (高鷲村, Takasu-mura) was a village located in Gujō District, Gifu Prefecture, Japan.

== History ==
The village was established in 1897.

On March 1, 2004, Takasu, along with the towns of Hachiman, Shirotori and Yamato, and the villages of Meihō, Minami and Wara (all from Gujō District), was merged to create the city of Gujō.
