= Gujo, Pakistan =

Town in Sindh, Pakistan

Gujo is a town located in Thatta district, in Pakistan's Sindh province. The most important archaeological sites of Amri Culture have been discovered near Gujo.

== Demographics ==
The population of Gujo, according to the 2017 census was 1,770.
