= Gujō =

Gujō 郡上市
- City
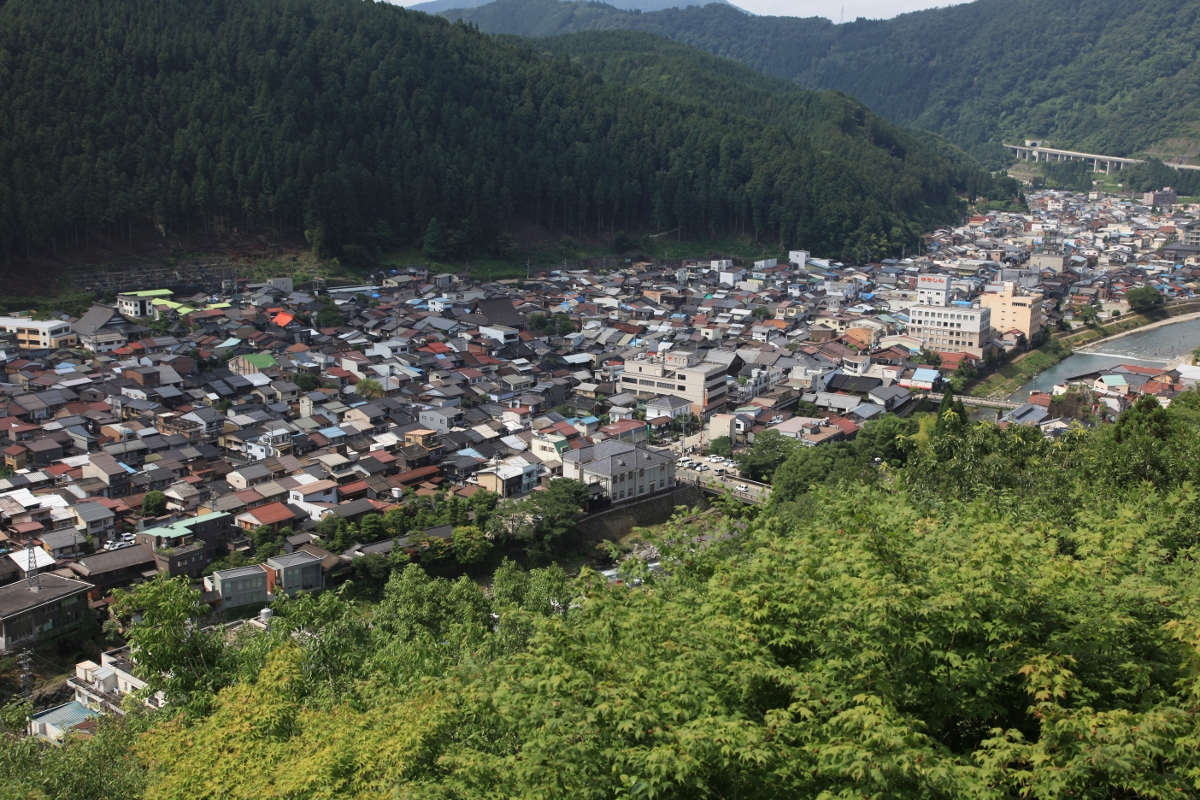

- Flag Seal

- Location of Gujō in Gifu Prefecture

- Coordinates: 35°44′54.8″N 136°57′51.6″E
- Country: Japan
- Region: Chūbu
- Prefecture: Gifu
- First official recorded: 82 AD
- City settled: March 1, 2004

Government
  - Mayor: Hirokazu Yamakawa (山川弘保) - from April 2024

Area
  - Total: 1,030.75 km^{2} (397.97 sq mi)

Population (February 1, 2019)
  - Total: 41,858
  - Density: 40.609/km^{2} (105.18/sq mi)
- Time zone: UTC+9 (Japan Standard Time)
- Phone number: 0575-67-1121
- Address: 228 Shimatani, Hachiman-chō, Gujō-shi, Gifu-ken 501-4297
- Climate: Cfa
- Website: Official website
- Symbols
- Flower: Magnolia kobus
- Tree: Maple

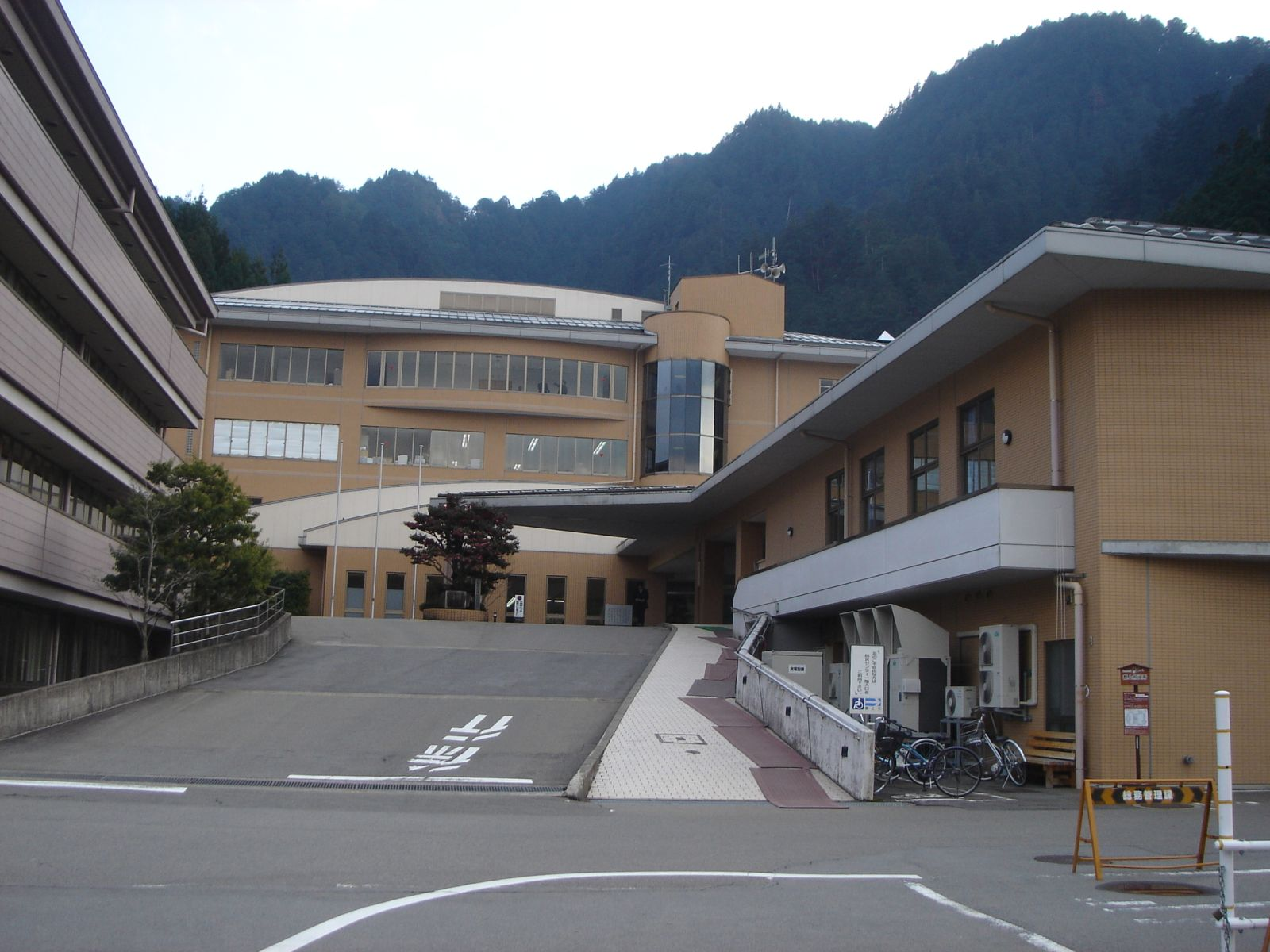
Gujō City Hall

Gujō (郡上市, Gujō-shi; Japanese pronunciation: [ɡɯ.(d)ʑoꜜː(.ɕi)]) is a city located in Gifu, Japan. As of 1 February 2019, the city had an estimated population of 41,858, and a population density of 41 persons per km^{2}, in 15,341 households. The total area of the city was 851.21 square kilometres (328.65 sq mi), including Gujo Hachiman, a part of the city that was an independent town until 2004, and has a large summer Bon odori festival, Gujo Odori.

== Geography ==
Gujō is located in west-central Gifu Prefecture. The headwaters of the Nagara River are in the city.

=== Waterways ===
Gujō's waterways operate the same way as they did in the 17th century. The canals and fountains are still used for washing rice, vegetables, and laundry. Townspeople cooperate to keep the canals clean and the water fresh. As a result of their efforts, Gujō's drinking water is a source of local pride.

Gujō Hachiman is in a valley where three major fast-running rivers meet: the Yoshida, the Nagara and the Kodara. The local ayu, soba, and sake all depend on the water for their flavors. Some residents still use the town's unique system of small waterways to wash laundry and dishes, following a set of very strict rules that describe what may be washed where. This practice has survived for centuries and ensures that all households have access to clean water.

=== Neighbouring municipalities ===
- Fukui Prefecture
  - Ōno
- Gifu Prefecture
  - Gero
  - Mino
  - Seki
  - Takayama

== Climate ==
The city has a climate characterized by hot and humid summers, and mild winters (Köppen climate classification Cfa). The average annual temperature in Gujō is 12.8 °C (55.0 °F). The average annual rainfall is 2,689.8 mm (105.90 in) with July as the wettest month. The temperatures are highest on average in August, at around 25.3 °C (77.5 °F), and lowest in January, at around 0.8 °C (33.4 °F).

Climate data for Hachiman, Gujō (1991–2020 normals, extremes 1978–present)
Month	Jan	Feb	Mar	Apr	May	Jun	Jul	Aug	Sep	Oct	Nov	Dec	Year
Record high °C (°F)	16.7 (62.1)	19.7 (67.5)	25.2 (77.4)	29.7 (85.5)	34.2 (93.6)	38.3 (100.9)	40.0 (104.0)	39.8 (103.6)	39.1 (102.4)	32.2 (90.0)	23.6 (74.5)	20.6 (69.1)	40.0 (104.0)
Mean daily maximum °C (°F)	5.9 (42.6)	7.6 (45.7)	12.3 (54.1)	18.4 (65.1)	23.5 (74.3)	26.5 (79.7)	30.0 (86.0)	31.7 (89.1)	27.4 (81.3)	21.4 (70.5)	14.8 (58.6)	8.4 (47.1)	19.0 (66.2)
Daily mean °C (°F)	0.8 (33.4)	1.5 (34.7)	5.4 (41.7)	11.2 (52.2)	16.5 (61.7)	20.5 (68.9)	24.3 (75.7)	25.3 (77.5)	21.3 (70.3)	14.9 (58.8)	8.5 (47.3)	3.1 (37.6)	12.8 (55.0)
Mean daily minimum °C (°F)	−2.7 (27.1)	−2.8 (27.0)	0.0 (32.0)	4.9 (40.8)	10.4 (50.7)	15.8 (60.4)	20.4 (68.7)	21.1 (70.0)	17.0 (62.6)	10.4 (50.7)	4.0 (39.2)	−0.5 (31.1)	8.2 (46.8)
Record low °C (°F)	−11.4 (11.5)	−14.1 (6.6)	−11.2 (11.8)	−3.6 (25.5)	−0.3 (31.5)	6.3 (43.3)	12.2 (54.0)	12.6 (54.7)	5.6 (42.1)	−0.6 (30.9)	−3.5 (25.7)	−9.1 (15.6)	−14.1 (6.6)
Average precipitation mm (inches)	109.4 (4.31)	110.6 (4.35)	185.9 (7.32)	219.8 (8.65)	230.6 (9.08)	291.8 (11.49)	419.6 (16.52)	324.6 (12.78)	339.3 (13.36)	215.3 (8.48)	140.1 (5.52)	129.0 (5.08)	2,689.8 (105.90)
Average precipitation days (≥ 1.0 mm)	12.3	10.8	12.0	11.2	11.6	13.4	15.6	13.3	12.8	10.3	10.1	12.9	146.3
Mean monthly sunshine hours	139.1	154.2	185.9	197.5	210.8	167.5	170.8	204.9	161.3	168.0	146.1	131.8	2,040
Source: Japan Meteorological Agency (1991–2020 normals, extremes 1978–present)

Climate data for Nagataki, Gujō (1991–2020 normals, extremes 1978–present)
Month	Jan	Feb	Mar	Apr	May	Jun	Jul	Aug	Sep	Oct	Nov	Dec	Year
Record high °C (°F)	13.9 (57.0)	16.4 (61.5)	23.1 (73.6)	29.2 (84.6)	31.5 (88.7)	35.0 (95.0)	36.2 (97.2)	36.8 (98.2)	34.7 (94.5)	29.7 (85.5)	23.3 (73.9)	18.1 (64.6)	36.8 (98.2)
Mean daily maximum °C (°F)	4.0 (39.2)	5.1 (41.2)	9.4 (48.9)	16.1 (61.0)	21.5 (70.7)	24.7 (76.5)	28.1 (82.6)	29.7 (85.5)	25.5 (77.9)	20.0 (68.0)	13.5 (56.3)	6.8 (44.2)	17.0 (62.6)
Daily mean °C (°F)	−0.2 (31.6)	0.3 (32.5)	3.8 (38.8)	9.8 (49.6)	15.3 (59.5)	19.3 (66.7)	22.9 (73.2)	24.0 (75.2)	20.0 (68.0)	14.0 (57.2)	7.9 (46.2)	2.4 (36.3)	11.6 (52.9)
Mean daily minimum °C (°F)	−3.5 (25.7)	−3.7 (25.3)	−0.7 (30.7)	4.3 (39.7)	9.7 (49.5)	14.8 (58.6)	19.1 (66.4)	20.0 (68.0)	16.0 (60.8)	9.6 (49.3)	3.6 (38.5)	−0.9 (30.4)	7.4 (45.3)
Record low °C (°F)	−12.4 (9.7)	−14.6 (5.7)	−9.6 (14.7)	−4.7 (23.5)	−0.6 (30.9)	6.5 (43.7)	11.8 (53.2)	11.6 (52.9)	4.9 (40.8)	−0.9 (30.4)	−4.5 (23.9)	−10.9 (12.4)	−14.6 (5.7)
Average precipitation mm (inches)	180.1 (7.09)	145.5 (5.73)	199.8 (7.87)	237.6 (9.35)	252.9 (9.96)	297.4 (11.71)	490.7 (19.32)	322.4 (12.69)	379.2 (14.93)	206.6 (8.13)	175.0 (6.89)	212.0 (8.35)	3,075.2 (121.07)
Average snowfall cm (inches)	223 (88)	162 (64)	88 (35)	2 (0.8)	0 (0)	0 (0)	0 (0)	0 (0)	0 (0)	0 (0)	7 (2.8)	136 (54)	597 (235)
Average precipitation days (≥ 1.0 mm)	17.7	14.2	14.3	12.8	12.0	14.0	16.1	13.3	13.3	11.1	12.9	18.2	169.4
Mean monthly sunshine hours	82.2	106.8	157.6	181.0	196.6	155.7	147.0	179.3	136.5	138.4	107.3	84.5	1,674.5
Source: Japan Meteorological Agency (1991–2020 normals, extremes 1978–present)

== Demographics ==
According to Japanese census data, the population of Gujō has steadily declined over the past 50 years.

Historical population
Year	Pop.	±%
1970	54,146	—
1980	52,690	−2.7%
1990	50,986	−3.2%
2000	49,377	−3.2%
2010	44,491	−9.9%
2020	38,997	−12.3%

== History ==
Historically, area around Gujō was part of the former Mino Province. During the Edo period, most of the area was under the control of Gujō Domain of the Tokugawa shogunate. Post-Meiji restoration cadastral reforms, the area was organised into Gujō District, Gifu. The town of Hachiman was created on July 1, 1889, with the establishment of the modern municipalities system. The modern city of Gujō was established on March 1, 2004, from the combining the towns of Hachiman, Shirotori and Yamato, and the villages of Meihō, Minami, Takasu and Wara (all from Gujō District).

== Government ==
Gujō has a mayor-council form of government with a directly elected mayor and a unicameral city assembly of 18 members.

== Economy ==
=== Food replicas ===
Gujō is a leading producer of food replicas in Japan. Many of the food replicas, used by restaurants to decorate their windows and inform patrons of their dishes, are produced here.

== Education ==
Gujō has 22 public elementary schools, eight public middle schools operated by the city government, two public high school operated by the Gifu Prefectural Board of Education.

== Transportation ==
=== Railway ===
- - Nagaragawa Railway Etsumi-Nan Line
  - Hanno - Konno - Yasaka - Minami-Kodakara-Onsen - Ōya - Fukuno - Minami-Kariyasu - Akaike - Fukado - Aioi - Gujō-Hachiman - Shizen'en-mae - Yamada - Tokunaga - Gujō-Yamato - Manba - Kamimanba - Ōnaka - Ōshima - Mino-Shirotori - Shirotori-Kōgen - Hakusan-Nagataki - Hokunō

=== Highway ===
- Tōkai-Hokuriku Expressway
- National Route 156
- National Route 158
- National Route 256
- National Route 472

== Local attractions ==
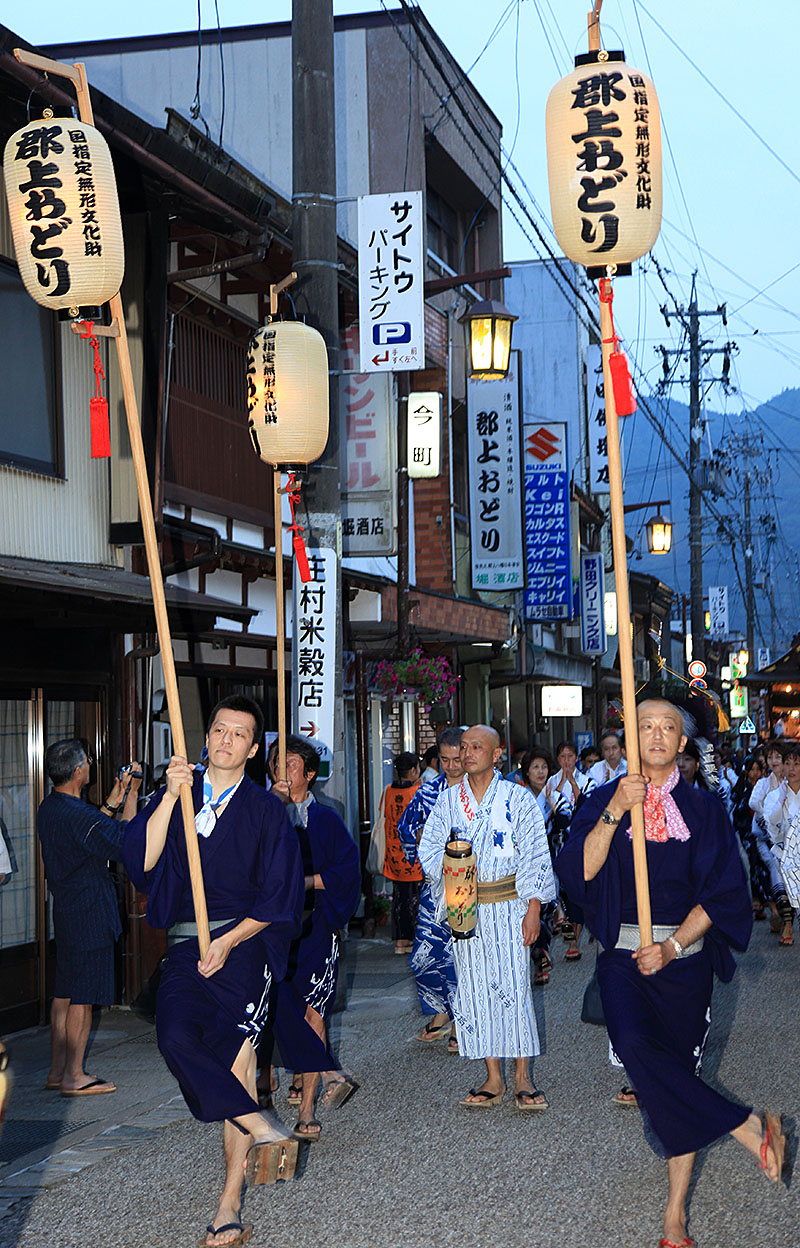
Gujō Odori

- Gujō Hachiman Castle
- Hirugano Botanical Garden

=== Gujō Odori ===
The dance festival — Gujō Odori — started over 400 years ago and continues today. During the four days of Obon in mid-August, dances continue all night. The dances begin on the same night as Kyoto's Gion Festival and continue for 30 nights. They begin at the Yasaka Shrine and move to another shrine each night. The Gujō Odori Preservation Society tell musical stories through an o-hayashi, which consists of a soloist, a shamisen, a taiko, and a shakuhachi. Listeners participate by dancing around the stage. During Urabon (August 13 to 16) the dancing continues until 5 a.m. More than 20,000 visitors come to town for the odori.
