= Gujō District, Gifu =

Former district in Gifu prefecture, Japan

Gujō District (郡上郡, Gujō-gun) was a district located in Gifu Prefecture, Japan. It was dissolved on March 1, 2004 when all seven towns and villages in the district merged, effectively turning the district into the city of Gujō.

As of 2000, the district had an estimated population of 49,377 and a density of 47.8 persons per km^{2}. The total area was 1,031 km^{2} (same as the area of the city).

== Former towns and villages ==
The towns and villages formerly in the district, before merging into the city of Gujō were:

- Hachiman
- Meihō
- Minami
- Shirotori
- Takasu
- Wara
- Yamato
