= Hokunō Station =

Railway station in Gujō, Gifu Prefecture, Japan

Hokunō Station 北濃駅
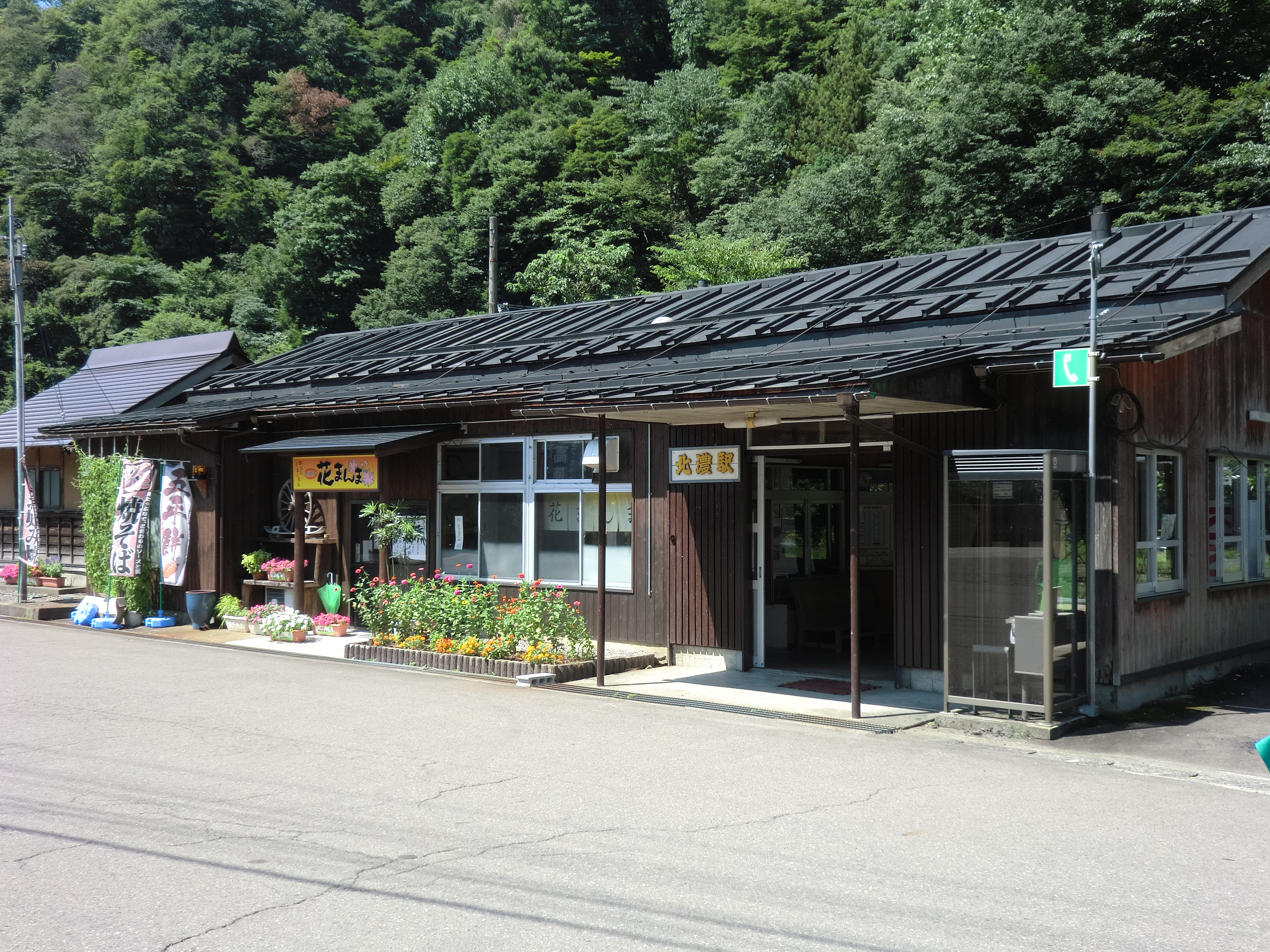
- Hokunō Station in August 2012

General information
- Location: Shiratori-cho Ukishima, Gujō-shi, Gifu-ken 501-5102; Japan
- Coordinates: 35°55′48.86″N 136°49′47.23″E
- Operator: Nagaragawa Railway
- Line: ■ Etsumi-Nan Line
- Distance: 71.2 km from Mino-Ōta
- Platforms: 1 island platform
- Tracks: 2

Other information
- Status: Staffed
- Website: Official website

History
- Opened: August 16, 1934
Location
- Location within Gifu Prefecture Location within Japan

Hokunō Station (北濃駅, Hokunō-eki) is a railway station in the city of Gujō, Gifu Prefecture, Japan, operated by the third sector railway operator Nagaragawa Railway.

== Lines ==
Hokunō Station is the terminal station of the Etsumi-Nan Line, and is 71.2 kilometers from the opposing terminus of the line at Mino-Ōta.

== Station layout ==
Hokunō Station has a one ground-level island platform connected to the station building by a level crossing. An additional siding leads to a disused railway turntable. The station is staffed. The station building houses a small cafe that serves meals of hot noodles. The cafe also sells a small selection of Nagaragawa Railway memorabilia, including crackers and biscuits printed with pictures of the railway.

== Adjacent stations ==
«	Service	»
Nagaragawa Railway
Etsumi-Nan Line
Hakusan-Nagataki	Local	Terminus

== History ==
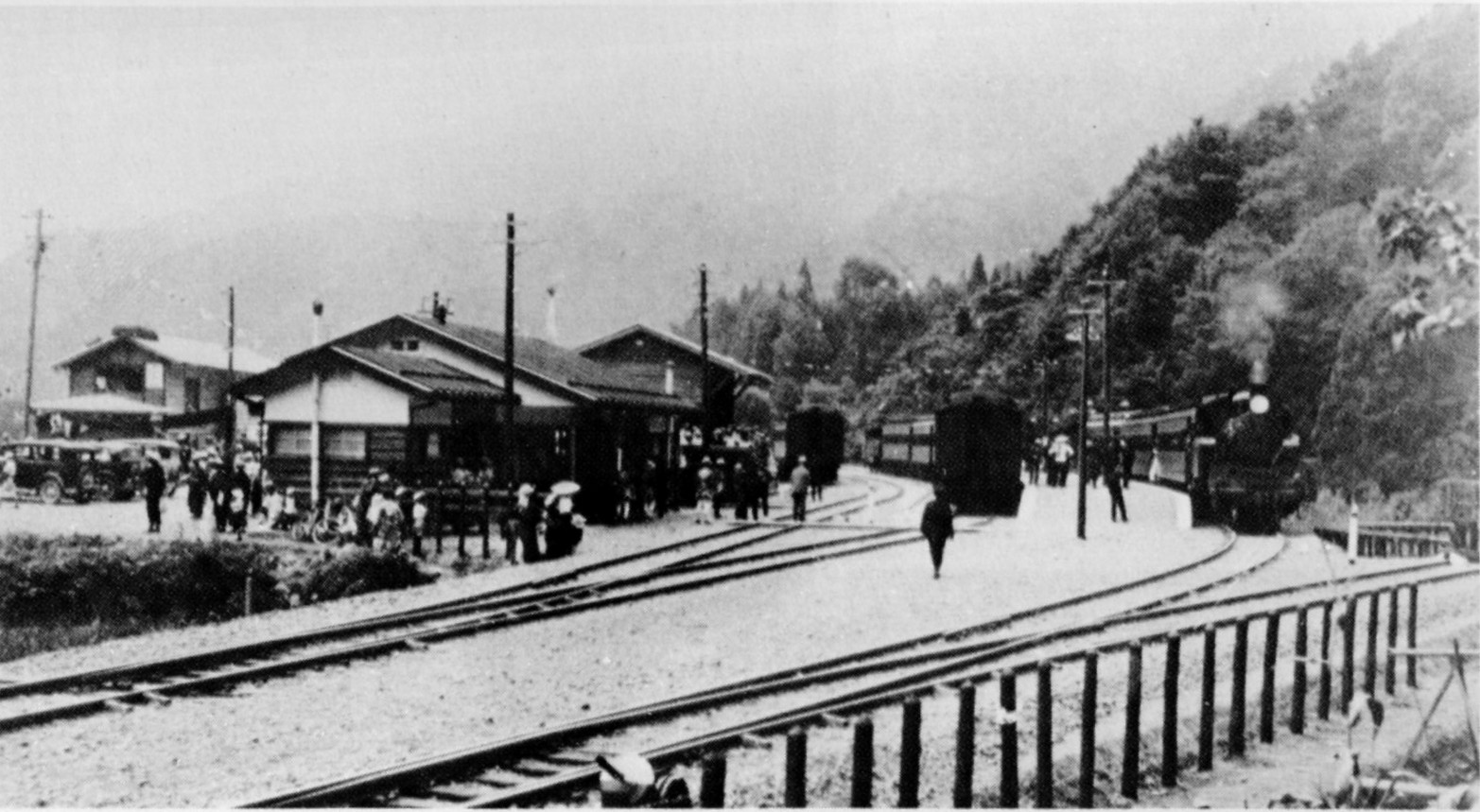
Hokunō station when the Etsumi-Nan Line opened (August 1934)

Hokunō Station was opened on August 16, 1934. It was extensively used during the construction of the Miboro Dam in 1967 and the Oshirakawa Dam in 1961. Freight operations were discontinued from October 1974. On December 11, 1986, it came under the control of the Nagaragawa Railway.

== Surrounding area ==
- Nagara River
- National Route 156

== See also ==
- List of railway stations in Japan
