= Mino-Ōta Station =

Railway station in Minokamo, Gifu Prefecture, Japan

CG07 CI00 Mino-Ōta Station 美濃太田駅
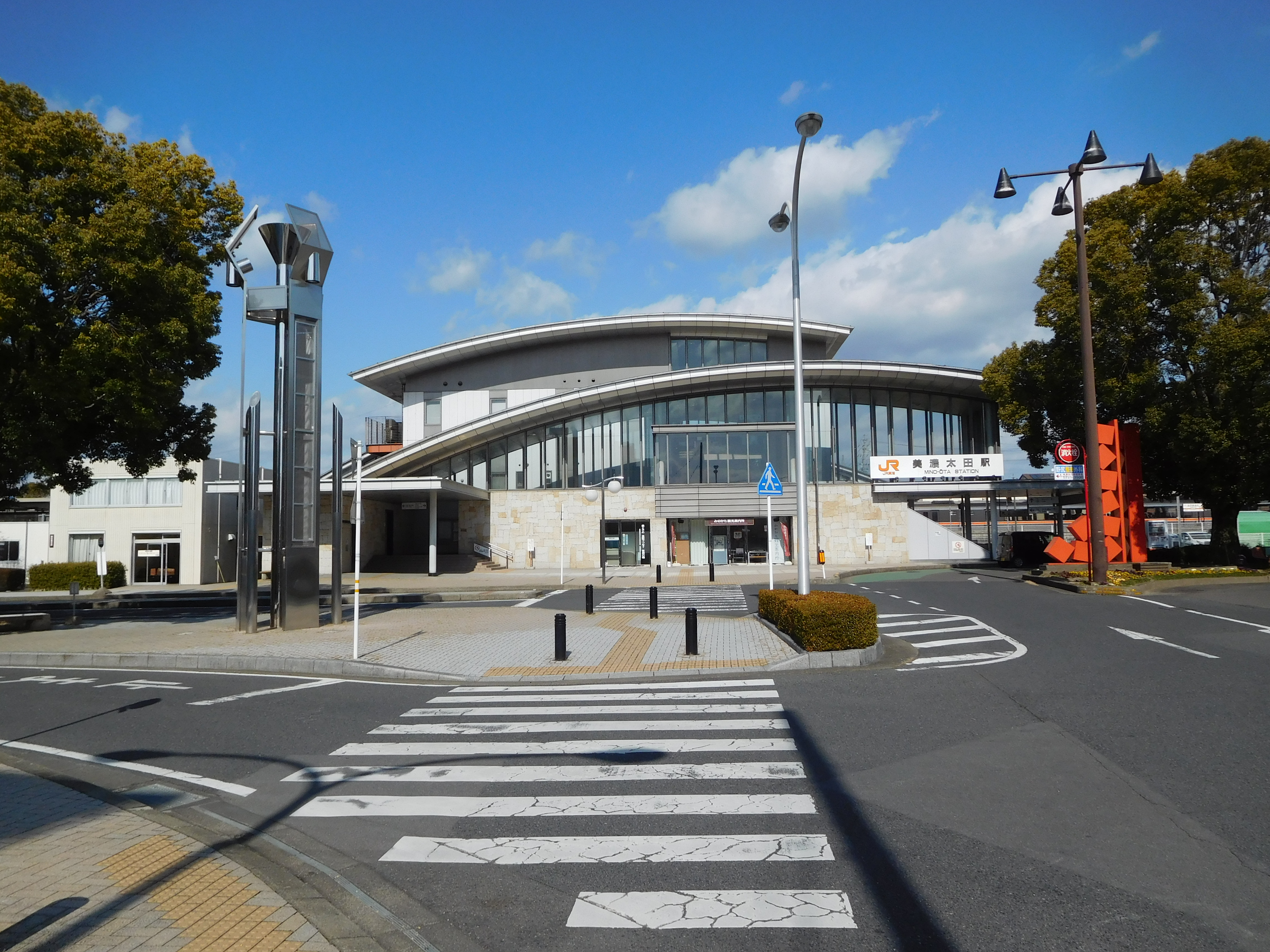
- Mino-Ōta Station in February 2019

General information
- Location: Ōta-machi, Minokamo-shi, Gifu-ken 505-0041; Japan
- Coordinates: 35.4456553°N 137.0193923°E
- Operator: JR Central; Nagaragawa Railway
- Lines: Takayama Main Line; Taita Line; ■ Etsumi-Nan Line
- Distance: 37.3 km from Gifu
- Platforms: 2 island + 1 side platform
- Tracks: 5

Construction
- Structure type: elevated

Other information
- Status: Staffed (Midori no Madoguchi)
- Station code: CG07, CI00

History
- Opened: December 28, 1918; 107 years ago
- Rebuilt: 1998; 28 years ago

Passengers
- FY2016: 2,776 daily (JR) + 416 (Nagaragawa Railway)
Location
- Location within Gifu Prefecture Location within Japan

Mino-Ōta Station (美濃太田駅, Mino-Ōta-eki) is a railway station in the city of Minokamo, Gifu Prefecture, Japan, operated by Central Japan Railway Company (JR Central) and the third-sector railway operator Nagaragawa Railway.

== Lines ==
Mino-Ōta Station is served by the JR Central Takayama Main Line, and is located 37.3 kilometers from the official starting point of the line at Gifu. It is also a terminal station for the JR central Taita Line and the Nagaragawa Railway Etsumi-Nan Line.

== Station layout ==
Mino-Ōta Station has two ground-level island platforms with an elevated station building and a Midori no Madoguchi staffed ticket office serving the JR Central portion of the station. The Nagaragawa Railway portion of the station has a single unnumbered ground-level side platform serving a single bi-directional track.

=== Platforms ===
1, 2	■ Takayama Main Line	for Gifu and Nagoya
	■ Taita Line	for Kani and Tajimi
3, 4	■ Takayama Main Line	for Gero and Takayama
	■ Taita Line	for Kani and Tajimi
none	■ Etsumi-Nan Line	for Hokunō

== Adjacent stations ==
«	Service	»
Taita Line
Mino-Kawai	Local	Terminus
Takayama Main Line
Sakahogi	Local	Kobi
Unuma or Gifu	Limited Express Hida	Shirakawaguchi or Hida-Kanayama
Etsumi-Nan Line
Terminus	Local	Maehira-Kōen

== History ==
Mino-Ōta Station opened on November 12, 1921. The station was absorbed into the JR Central network upon the privatization of Japanese National Railways (JNR) on April 1, 1987. A new station building was completed in March 1998.

Station numbering was introduced to the Taita Line and Takayama Main Line in March 2018; Mino-Ōta Station was assigned station numbers CI00 for the Taita Line and CG07 for the Takayayama Main Line.

== Passenger statistics ==
In fiscal 2016, the JR portion of the station was used by an average of 2,446 passengers daily (boarding passengers only). The Nagaragawa Railway portion of the station was used by 416 passengers daily.

== Surrounding area ==
- Minokamo City Hall
- National Route 21
- National Route 41
- National Route 248
- Kiso River

== See also ==
- List of railway stations in Japan
