= Hime Station =

Railway station in Tajimi, Gifu Prefecture, Japan

CI04 Hime Station 姫駅
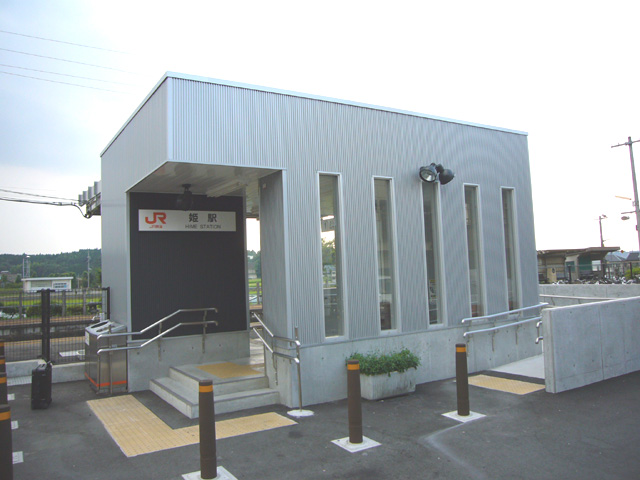
- Hime Station in October 2008

General information
- Location: Hime-cho 1-chome, Tajimi-shi, Gifu-ken 507-0061; Japan
- Coordinates: 35.3821°N 137.0717°E
- Operator: JR Central
- Line: Taita Line
- Distance: 7.9 km from Tajimi
- Platforms: 2 side platforms
- Tracks: 2

Other information
- Status: Unstaffed
- Station code: CI04

History
- Opened: December 28, 1918

Passengers
- FY2015: 389 daily
Location
- Location within Gifu Prefecture Location within Japan

Hime Station (姫駅, Hime-eki) is a railway station on the Taita Line in the city of Tajimi, Gifu Prefecture, Japan, operated by Central Japan Railway Company (JR Tōkai).

== Lines ==
Hime Station is served by the Taita Line, and is located 7.9 rail kilometers from the official starting point of the line at Tajimi.

== Station layout ==
Hime Station has two opposed ground-level side platforms connected by a level crossing. The station is unattended.

=== Platforms ===
1	■ Taita Line	For Nemoto, Koizumi, and Tajimi
2	■ Taita Line	For Kani, Mino-Ōta, Unuma, and Gifu

== Adjacent stations ==
«	Service	»
JR Central
Taita Line
Nemoto	Local	Shimogiri

== History ==
Hime Station opened on December 28, 1918, as a station on the Tōnō Railway. The station was absorbed into the JR Tōkai network upon the privatization of the Japanese National Railways (JNR) on April 1, 1987. A new station building was completed in 2006.

== Passenger statistics ==
In fiscal 2016, the station was used by an average of 389 passengers daily (boarding passengers only).

== Surrounding area ==
- Hime Post Office
- Minami-Hime Middle School
- Minami Hime Elementary School

== See also ==
- List of railway stations in Japan
