= Mino-Kawai Station =

Railway station in Minokamo, Gifu Prefecture, Japan

CI01 Mino-Kawai Station 美濃川合駅
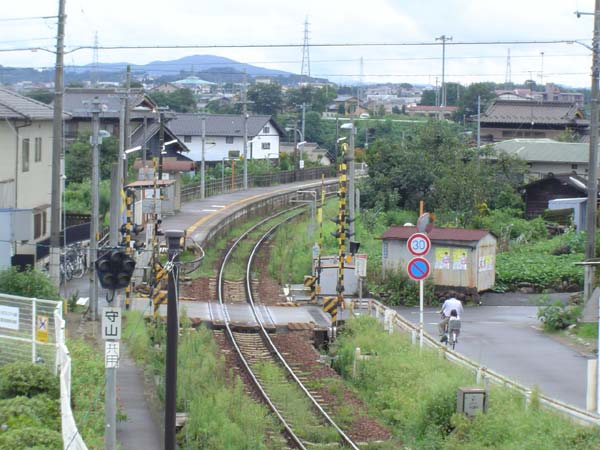
- Mino-Kawai Station in September 2004

General information
- Location: Nemoto-cho 3-chome, Tajimi-shi, Gifu-ken 507-0065; Japan
- Coordinates: 35.4444°N 137.0454°E
- Operator: JR Central
- Line: Taita Line
- Distance: 15.4 km from Tajimi
- Platforms: 1 side platform
- Tracks: 1

Other information
- Status: Unstaffed
- Station code: CI01

History
- Opened: December 28, 1918

Passengers
- FY2015: 431 daily
Location
- Location within Gifu Prefecture Location within Japan

Mino-Kawai Station (美濃川合駅, Mino-Kawai-eki) is a railway station on the Taita Line in the city of Minokamo, Gifu Prefecture, Japan, operated by Central Japan Railway Company (JR Tōkai). This station is near the bank of the Kiso River, which the line crosses between this station and Kani Station.

== Lines ==
Mino-Kawai Station is served by the Taita Line, and is located 15.4 rail kilometers from the official starting point of the line at Tajimi.

== Station layout ==
Mino-Kawai Station has one ground-level side platform serving a single, curved, bi-directional track. The station is unattended.

== Adjacent stations ==
«	Service	»
JR Central
Taita Line
Kani	Local	Mino-Ōta

== History ==
Mino-Kawai Station opened on December 26, 1952. The station was absorbed into the JR Tōkai network upon the privatization of the Japanese National Railways (JNR) on April 1, 1987.

== Passenger statistics ==
In fiscal 2016, the station was used by an average of 431 passengers daily (boarding passengers only).

== Surrounding area ==
- Kiso River
- National Route 41
- National Route 248

== See also ==
- List of railway stations in Japan
