= Nemoto Station =

Railway station in Tajimi, Gifu Prefecture, Japan

CI05 Nemoto Station 根本駅
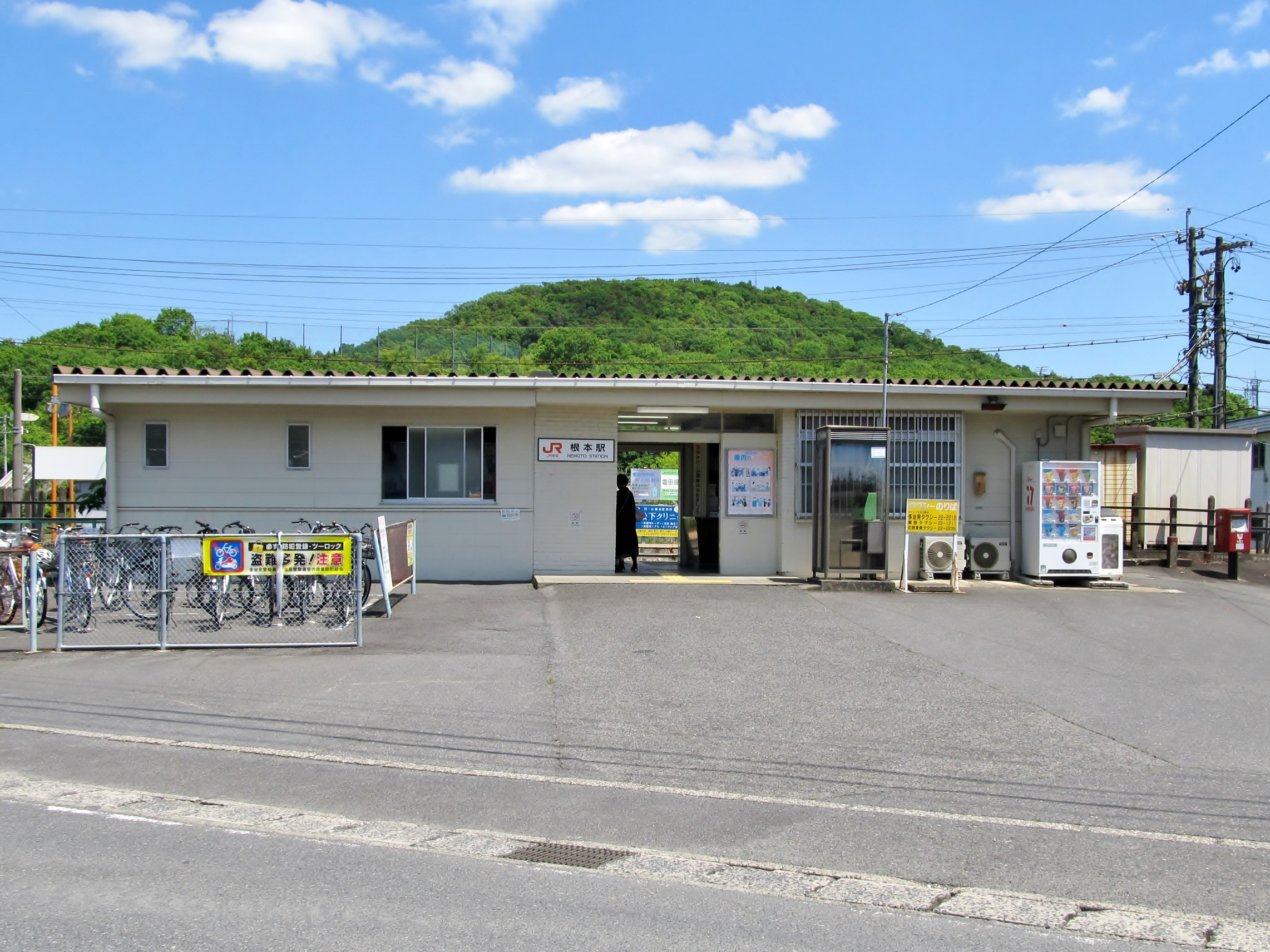
- Nemoto Station in May 2024

General information
- Location: Nemoto-cho 3-chome, Tajimi-shi, Gifu-ken 507-0065; Japan
- Coordinates: 35.3618°N 137.0906°E
- Operator: JR Central
- Line: Taita Line
- Distance: 4.8 km from Tajimi
- Platforms: 1 side platform
- Tracks: 1

Other information
- Status: Staffed
- Station code: CI05

History
- Opened: December 28, 1918

Passengers
- FY2016: 1261 daily
Location
- Location within Gifu Prefecture Location within Japan

Nemoto Station (根本駅, Nemoto-eki) is a railway station on the Taita Line in the city of Tajimi, Gifu Prefecture, Japan, operated by Central Japan Railway Company (JR Tōkai).

== Lines ==
Nemoto Station is served by the Taita Line, and is located 4.8 rail kilometers from the official starting point of the line at Tajimi.

== Station layout ==
Nemoto Station has one ground-level side platform serving a single bi-directional track. The station is staffed.

== Adjacent stations ==
«	Service	»
JR Central
Taita Line
Koizumi	Local	Hime

== History ==
Nemoto Station opened on February 15, 1920 as a station on the Tōnō Railway. It was closed from October 1, 1928 and reopened on December 26, 1952. The station was absorbed into the JR Tōkai network upon the privatization of the Japanese National Railways (JNR) on April 1, 1987.

== Passenger statistics ==
In fiscal 2016, the station was used by an average of 1,262 passengers daily (boarding passengers only).

== Surrounding area ==
- National Route 248
- ruins of Nemoto Castle

== See also ==
- List of railway stations in Japan
