= Tajimi =

Tajimi 多治見市
- City
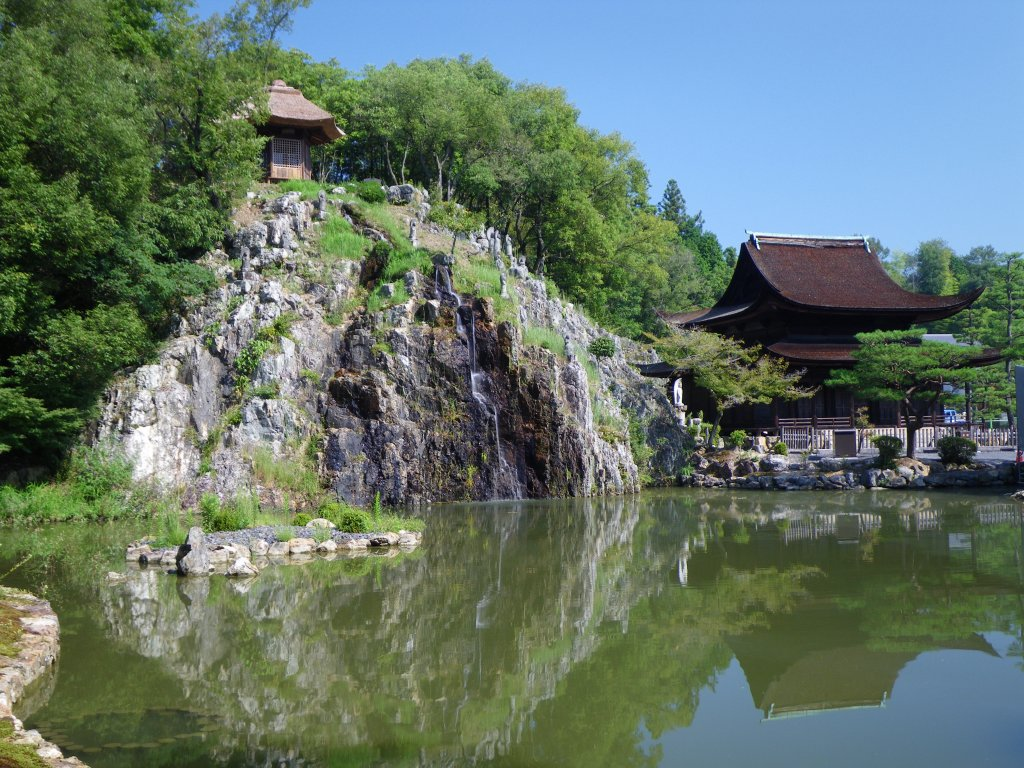
- Eihō-ji（Kannon Hall）

- Flag Emblem

- Location of Tajimi in Gifu Prefecture

- Coordinates: 35°19′58″N 137°07′53.6″E
- Country: Japan
- Region: Chūbu
- Prefecture: Gifu

Government
  - Mayor: Takagi Takayuki (since April 2023)

Area
  - Total: 91.25 km^{2} (35.23 sq mi)

Population (March 1, 2020)
  - Total: 110,070
  - Density: 1,206/km^{2} (3,124/sq mi)
- Time zone: UTC+9 (Japan Standard Time)
- Phone number: 0572-22-1111
- Address: 2-15 Hinode-machi, Tajimi-shi, Gifu-ken 507-8703
- Climate: Cfa
- Website: Official website
- Symbols
- Flower: Azalea, Platycodon grandiflorus
- Tree: Ginkgo biloba, Magnolia stellata

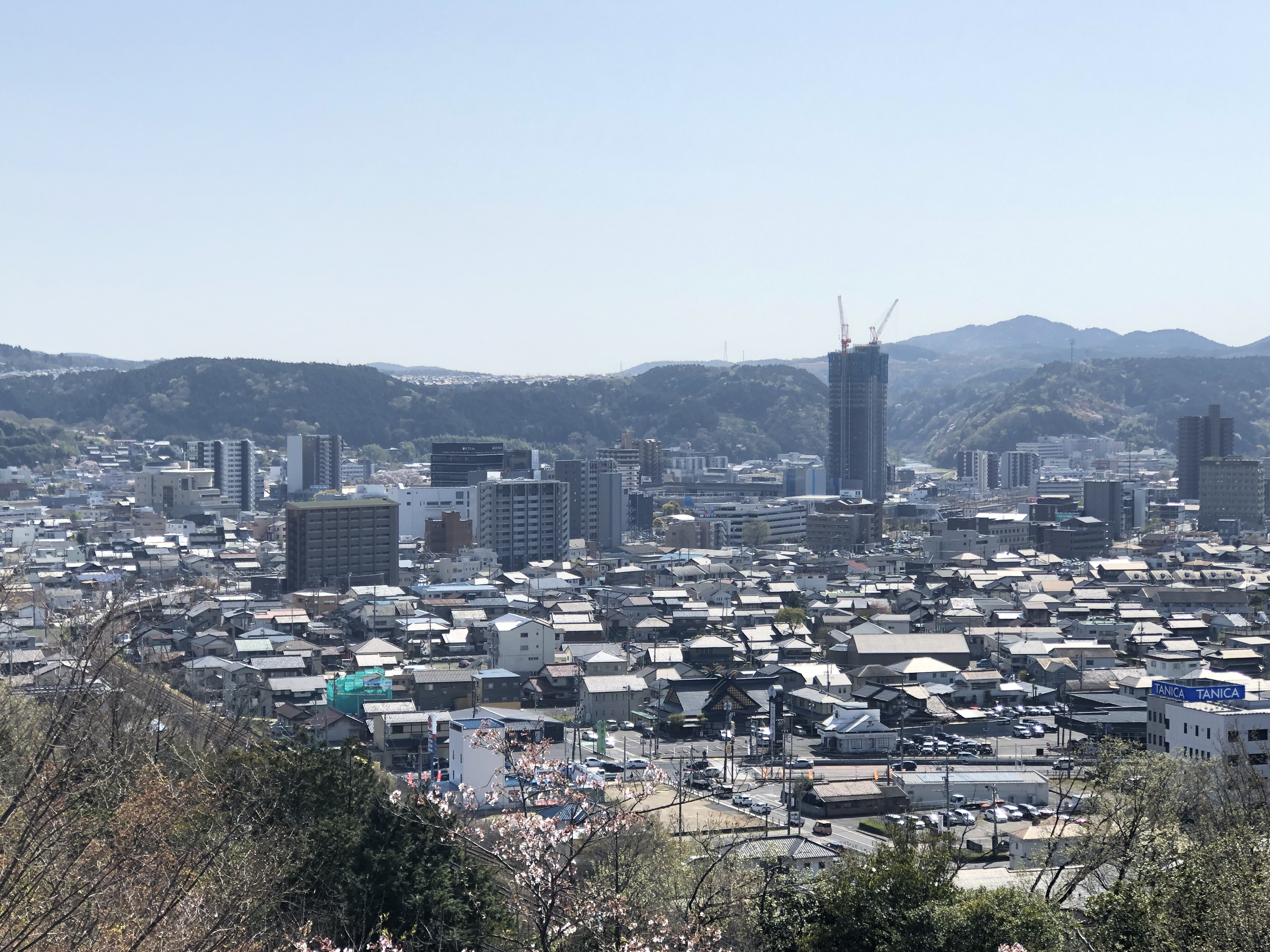
Skyline of Tajimi City

Tajimi (多治見市, Tajimi-shi) is a city located in Gifu, Japan. As of 1 March 2020, the city had an estimated population of 110,070 in 46,580 households, and a population density of 1200 people per km^{2}. The total area of the city was 117.01 square kilometres (45.18 sq mi). The city is famous for its production of Mino ware ceramics, especially in the Oribe and Seto styles. Tajimi is a member of the World Health Organization’s Alliance for Healthy Cities (AFHC).

== Geography ==
Tajimi is located on the southern border of Gifu Prefecture with Aichi Prefecture. The Kiso River and the Shōnai River flow through the city.

=== Neighbouring municipalities ===
- Aichi Prefecture
  - Inuyama
  - Kasugai
  - Seto
- Gifu Prefecture
  - Kani
  - Toki

=== Mountains ===
- Mt. Takane (556.3 m) The highest peak in the city.
- Kasahara Fuji (471.8 m) -The second highest peak, on the border with Seto City in Shiomi Park .
- Mt. Hogetsu (456.5 m)
- Mt. Miroku (436.6m) - located on the border with Kasugai City, on the Tōkai Nature Trail.
- Mt. Doju (429 m)
- Mt. Kosha (416.6 m)
- Mt. Sengen (372 m)
- Mt. Takane (225.6 m)

=== Rivers ===
- Gojō River
- Ichinokura River
- Kasahara River
- Kiso River
- Ohara River
- Shinzawa River
- Shōnai River

== Climate ==
The city has a climate characterized by hot and humid summers, and relatively cold winters (Köppen climate classification Cfa). The average annual temperature in Tajimi is 15.2 °C (59.4 °F). The average annual rainfall is 1,644.3 mm (64.74 in) with July as the wettest month. The temperatures are highest on average in August, at around 34.1 °C (93.4 °F), and lowest in January, at around −1.9 °C (28.6 °F). Tajimi set the record for Japan's highest recorded daytime temperature of 40.9 °C (105.6 °F) on August 16, 2007.

Climate data for Tajimi (elevation 120 m, 1991–2020 normals, extremes 1978–present)
Month	Jan	Feb	Mar	Apr	May	Jun	Jul	Aug	Sep	Oct	Nov	Dec	Year
Record high °C (°F)	18.2 (64.8)	22.2 (72.0)	25.4 (77.7)	31.0 (87.8)	34.9 (94.8)	39.4 (102.9)	40.7 (105.3)	40.9 (105.6)	38.5 (101.3)	33.1 (91.6)	26.2 (79.2)	22.1 (71.8)	40.9 (105.6)
Mean daily maximum °C (°F)	9.5 (49.1)	10.9 (51.6)	15.0 (59.0)	20.7 (69.3)	25.5 (77.9)	28.5 (83.3)	32.3 (90.1)	34.1 (93.4)	29.8 (85.6)	23.9 (75.0)	17.8 (64.0)	11.9 (53.4)	21.7 (71.1)
Daily mean °C (°F)	3.2 (37.8)	4.2 (39.6)	8.1 (46.6)	13.7 (56.7)	18.6 (65.5)	22.5 (72.5)	26.4 (79.5)	27.7 (81.9)	23.8 (74.8)	17.5 (63.5)	11.1 (52.0)	5.6 (42.1)	15.2 (59.4)
Mean daily minimum °C (°F)	−1.9 (28.6)	−1.5 (29.3)	1.8 (35.2)	7.0 (44.6)	12.3 (54.1)	17.6 (63.7)	22.0 (71.6)	22.9 (73.2)	19.1 (66.4)	12.4 (54.3)	5.7 (42.3)	0.4 (32.7)	9.8 (49.6)
Record low °C (°F)	−9.3 (15.3)	−9.3 (15.3)	−6.7 (19.9)	−2.5 (27.5)	1.0 (33.8)	7.4 (45.3)	14.2 (57.6)	15.0 (59.0)	6.9 (44.4)	0.9 (33.6)	−2.7 (27.1)	−7.5 (18.5)	−9.3 (15.3)
Average precipitation mm (inches)	57.1 (2.25)	69.7 (2.74)	121.2 (4.77)	132.5 (5.22)	157.5 (6.20)	187.5 (7.38)	239.7 (9.44)	149.6 (5.89)	233.7 (9.20)	155.1 (6.11)	83.9 (3.30)	60.6 (2.39)	1,644.3 (64.74)
Average precipitation days (≥ 1.0 mm)	6.9	7.4	9.7	10.3	10.6	12.2	13.1	10.3	11.5	9.8	7.1	7.8	116.9
Mean monthly sunshine hours	164.8	167.3	198.1	202.5	206.0	147.4	170.8	209.4	163.9	166.5	158.2	158.2	2,113.9
Source: Japan Meteorological Agency

== Demographics ==
Per Japanese census data, the population of Tajimi peaked around the year 2000 and has declined since.

Historical population
Year	Pop.	±%
1970	76,846	—
1980	87,812	+14.3%
1990	106,213	+21.0%
2000	115,740	+9.0%
2010	112,595	−2.7%
2020	106,732	−5.2%

== History ==
The area around Tajimi was part of traditional Mino Province. During the Edo period, much of the area was tenryō territory under the direct control of Tokugawa shogunate. In the post-Meiji restoration cadastral reforms, Toki District in Gifu Prefecture was created, and the town of Tajimi was established on July 1, 1889, by the creation of the modern municipalities system. Tajimi annexed the town of Toyota from neighbouring Kani District in 1934, and was raised to city status on August 1, 1940.

Tajimi subsequently annexed the villages of Koizimi and Ikeda from Kani District in 1944, and the villages of Ichinokura and Kasahara from Toki District in 1951. On January 23, 2006, the town of Kasahara (from Toki District) was merged into Tajimi.

== Government ==
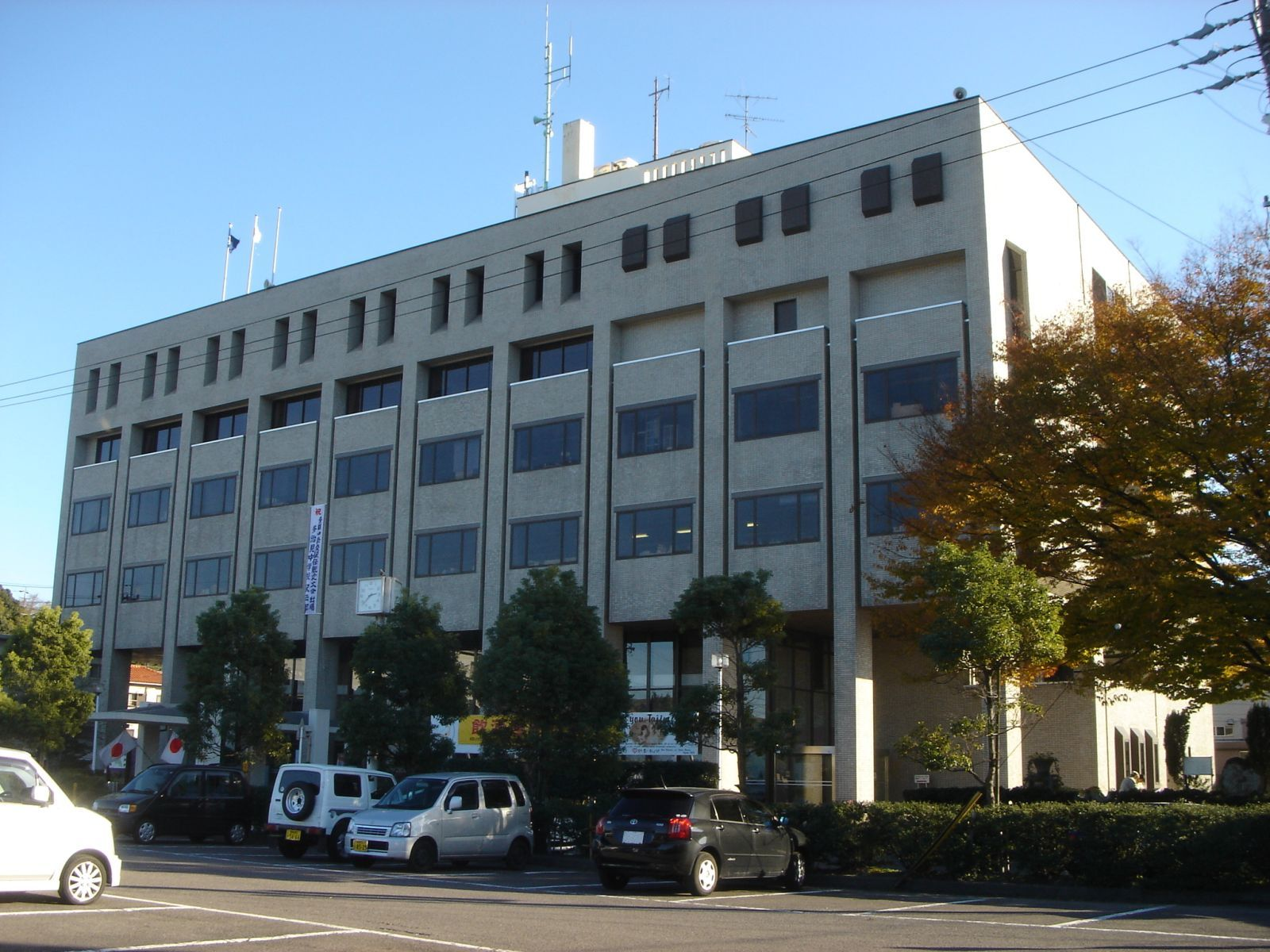
Tajimi City Hall

Tajimi has a mayor-council form of government with a directly elected mayor and a unicameral city legislature of 24 members.

== Economy ==
Tajimi is traditionally known for ceramics, mostly ceramic tiles and tableware, although due to increasing competitive pressures, especially from imported sources, only a few producers remain within the city limits, and economic activity in ceramics is increasingly orientated towards trade and wholesaling.

== Education ==
Tajimi has 13 public elementary schools and eight public middle schools operated by the city government and one private combined middle/high school. The city has three public high schools operated by the Gifu Prefectural Board of Education. The Nagoya Institute of Technology has a campus in Tajimi.

== Transportation ==
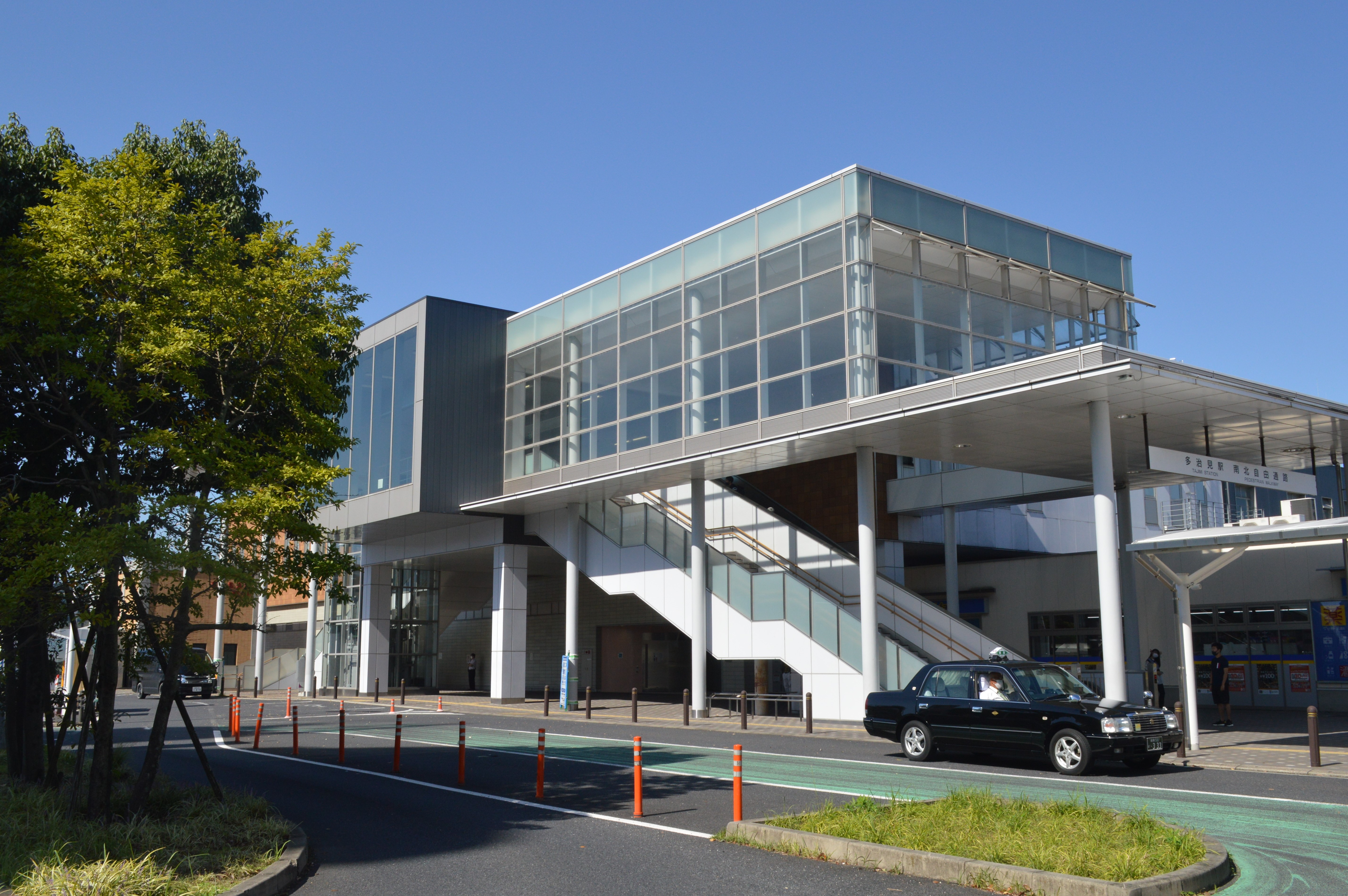
Tajimi Station

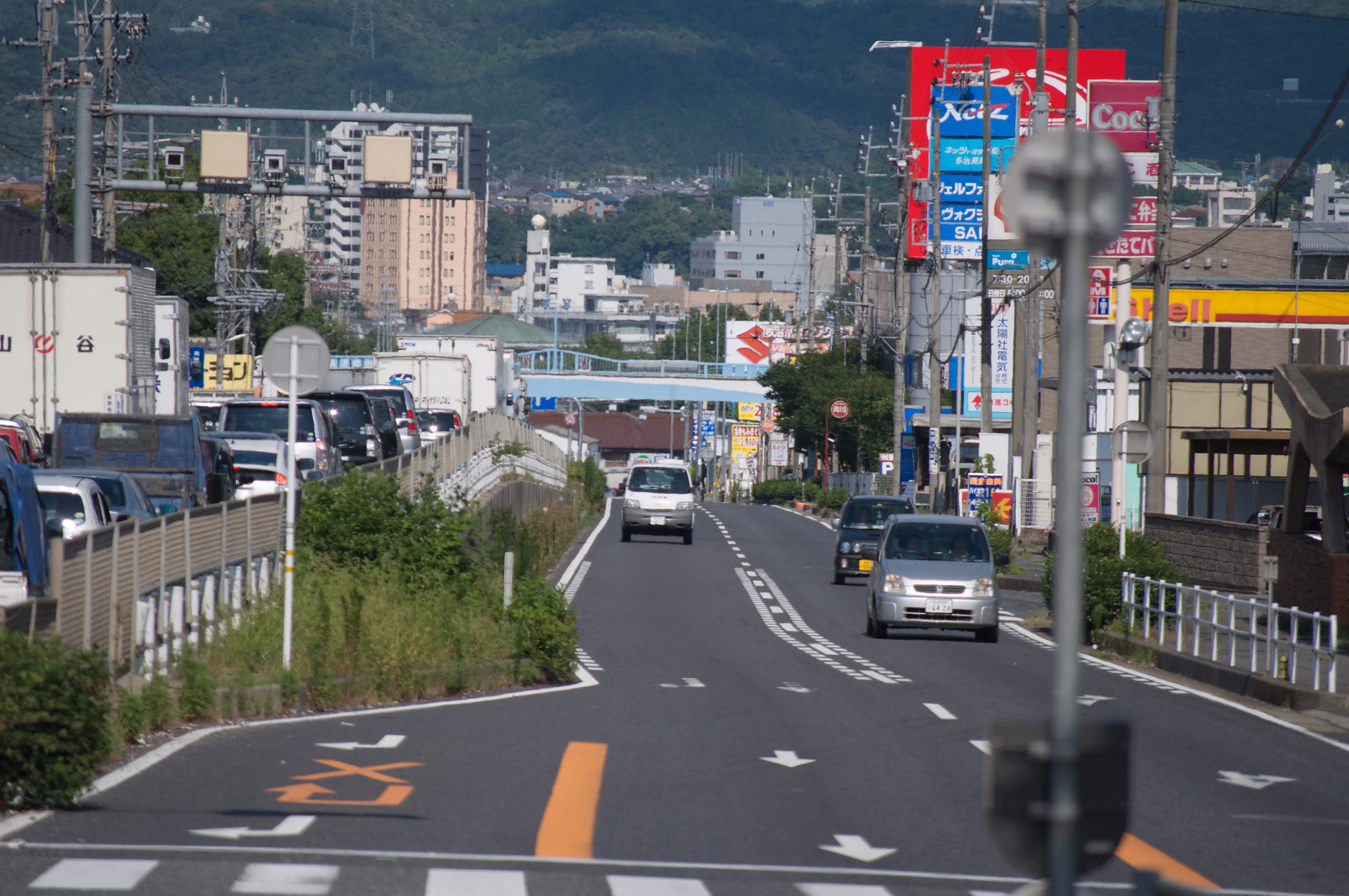
Panorama of Tajimi

=== Railway ===
- JR Central - Chūō Main Line

- Tajimi - Kokokei

- JR Central - Taita Line

- Tajimi - Koizumi - Nemoto - Hime

=== Highway ===
- Chūō Expressway
- National Route 19
- National Route 248

== Sister cities ==
- Terre Haute, Indiana, United States, since September 1962

== Local attractions ==
- Eihō-ji, a Zen monastery
- Gifu Prefectural Museum of Modern Ceramic Art
- Mino International Ceramics Festival (every three years)
