= Koizumi Station (Gifu) =

Railway station in Tajimi, Gifu Prefecture, Japan

CI06 Koizimi Station 小泉駅
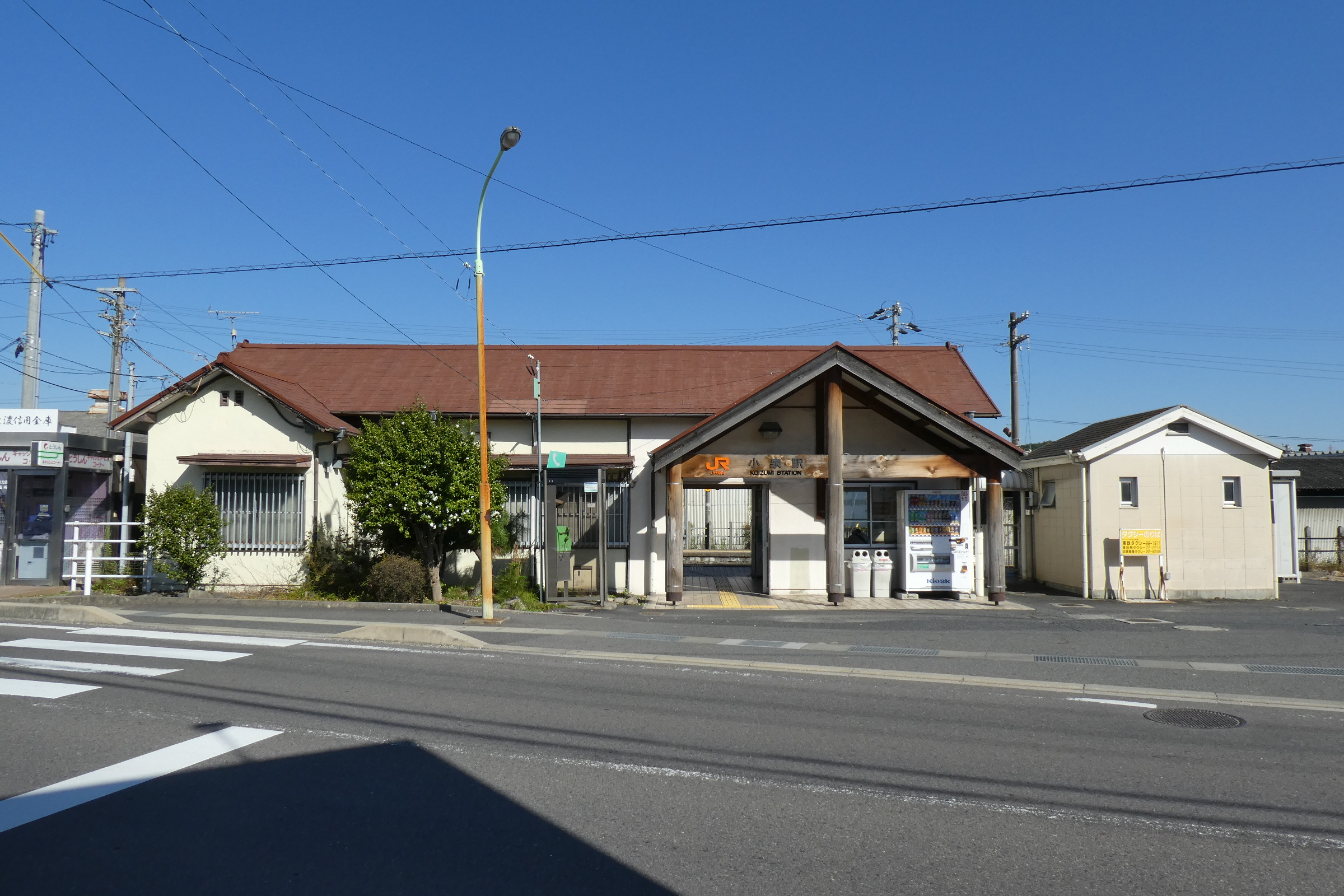
- Koizimi Station in November 2019

General information
- Location: Koizumi-cho 1-chome, Tajimi-shi, Gifu-ken 507-0073; Japan
- Coordinates: 35.3491°N 137.1006°E
- Operator: JR Central
- Line: Taita Line
- Distance: 3.2 km from Tajimi
- Platforms: 2 side platforms
- Tracks: 2

Other information
- Status: Staffed (Midori no Madoguchi)
- Station code: CI06
- Website: Official website

History
- Opened: December 28, 1918

Passengers
- FY2016: 1294 daily
Location
- Location within Gifu Prefecture Location within Japan

Koizumi Station (小泉駅, Koizumi-eki) is a railway station on the Taita Line in the city of Tajimi, Gifu Prefecture, Japan, operated by Central Japan Railway Company (JR Tokai).

== Lines ==
Koizumi Station is served by the Taita Line, and is located 3.2 rail kilometers from the official starting point of the line at Tajimi.

== Station layout ==
Koizumi Station has two opposed side platforms connected to the station building by a footbridge. The station has a Midori no Madoguchi staffed ticket office.

=== Platforms ===
1	■ Taita Line	For Nemoto, Kani, Mino-Ōta, Unuma, and Gifu
2	■ Taita Line	For Tajimi

== Adjacent stations ==
«	Service	»
JR Central
Taita Line
Tajimi	Local	Nemoto

== History ==
Koizumi Station opened on December 28, 1918. It was relocated to its present location on October 1, 1928. The station was absorbed into the JR Tokai network upon the privatization of the Japanese National Railways (JNR) on April 1, 1987.

== Passenger statistics ==
In fiscal 2016, the station was used by an average of 1,294 passengers daily (boarding passengers only).

== Surrounding area ==
- National Route 248
- Chūō Expressway - Koizumi IC

== See also ==
- List of railway stations in Japan
