= Jōkōji Station =

Railway station in Kasugai, Aichi Prefecture, Japan

CF10 Jōkōji Station 定光寺駅
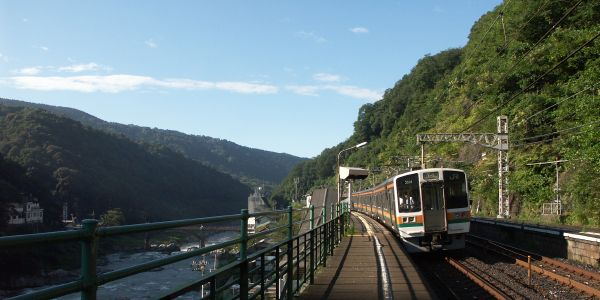
- Jōkōji Station in September 2005

General information
- Location: Tamano-cho, Kasugai-shi, Aichi-ken 487-0004; Japan
- Coordinates: 35°16′40″N 137°4′52″E
- Operator: JR Central
- Line: Chūō Main Line
- Distance: 368.8 kilometers from Tokyo
- Platforms: 2 side platforms

Other information
- Status: Unstaffed
- Station code: CF10

History
- Opened: January 1, 1924

Passengers
- FY2017: 157 daily
Location
- Location within Aichi Prefecture Location within Japan

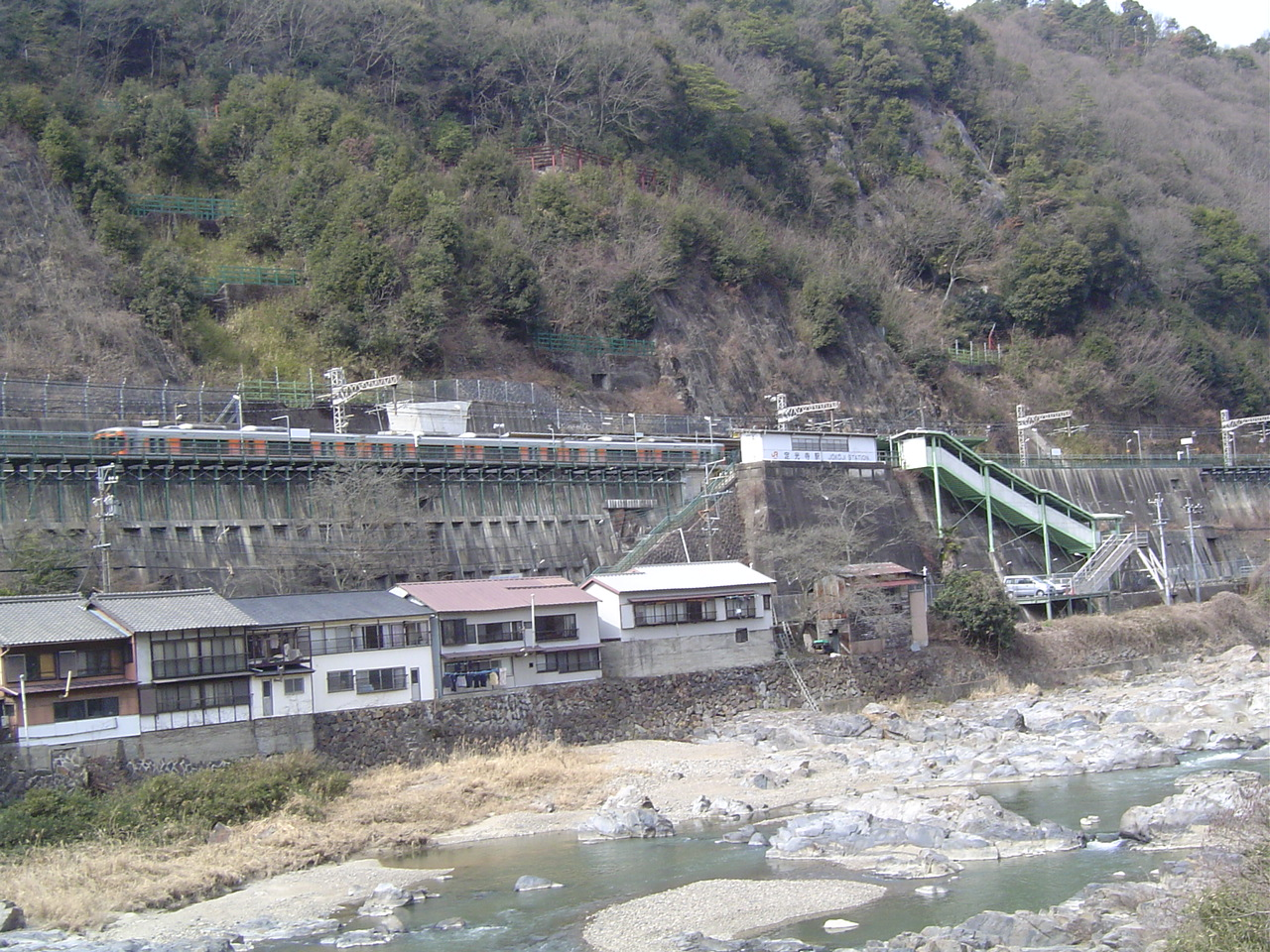
Jōkōji Station

Jōkōji Station (定光寺駅, Jōkōji-eki) is a railway station in the city of Kasugai, Aichi Prefecture, Japan, operated by Central Japan Railway Company (JR Tōkai).

== Lines ==
Jōkōji Station is served by the Chūō Main Line, and is located 368.8 kilometers from the starting point of the line at Tokyo Station and 28.1 kilometers from Nagoya Station.

== Station layout ==
The station has two opposed side platforms connected by a level crossing and located on an embankment with the station building below. The station building has automated ticket machines, TOICA automated turnstiles and is unattended.

=== Platforms ===
1	■ Chūō Main Line	For Nagoya
2	■ Chūō Main Line	For Tajimi, Nakatsugawa

== Adjacent stations ==
«	Service	»
JR Central
Chūō Main Line
Home Liner: Does not stop at this station
Central Liner: Does not stop at this station
Rapid: Does not stop at this station
Kokokei	Local	Kōzōji

== Station history ==
Jōkōji began as the Tamano Signal Stop (玉野信号所) on May 19, 1919. It was upgraded to the Jōkōji Provisional Stop (定光寺仮停車場) on August 15, 1920 and to a full passenger station on January 1, 1924. Along with the division and privatization of JNR on April 1, 1987, the station came under the control and operation of the Central Japan Railway Company.

== Passenger statistics ==
In fiscal 2017, the station was used by an average of 157 passengers daily (arriving passengers only).

== Surrounding area ==
- Tōkai Nature Trail
- Kakegawa Elementary School
- Aigi Tunnel

== See also ==
- List of railway stations in Japan
