= Shimogiri Station =

Railway station in Kani, Gifu Prefecture, Japan

CI03 Shimogiri Station 下切駅
- Shimogiri Station in June 2026

General information
- Location: Shimogiri 2117, Kani-shi, Gifu-ken 509-0245; Japan
- Coordinates: 35.3936°N 137.0639°E
- Operator: JR Central
- Line: Taita Line
- Distance: 9.4 km from Tajimi
- Platforms: 1 side platform
- Tracks: 1

Other information
- Status: Unstaffed
- Station code: CI03

History
- Opened: December 26, 1952

Passengers
- FY2016: 1261 daily
Location
- Location within Gifu Prefecture Location within Japan

Shimogiri Station (下切駅, Shimogiri-eki) it opened in 1952, it is a railway station on the Taita Line in the city of Kani, Gifu Prefecture, Japan, operated by Central Japan Railway Company (JR Tōkai).

== Lines ==
Shimogiri Station is served by the Taita Line, and is located 9.4 rail kilometers from the official starting point of the line at Tajimi.

== Station layout ==
Shimogiri Station has one ground-level side platform serving a single bi-directional track. The station is unattended.

== Adjacent stations ==
«	Service	»
JR Central
Taita Line
Hime	Local	Kani

== History ==
Shimogiri Station opened on December 26, 1952. The station was absorbed into the JR Tōkai network upon the privatization of the Japanese National Railways (JNR) on April 1, 1987.

== Surrounding area ==
- ruins of Ima Castle

== See also ==
- List of railway stations in Japan
