= HC35 =

Japanese train type

- Stock type: Hybrid DMU
- Replaced: KiHa 75
- Entered service: Planned for fiscal 2028–2029
- Number under construction: 38 vehicles (19 sets)
- Formation: 2 cars per trainset
- Operator: JR Central
- Lines served: Takayama Line; Taita Line; Kansai Main Line; Ise Line; Kisei Main Line; Sangū Line

The HC35 (Japanese: HC35形) is a hybrid diesel multiple unit (DMU) train type on order by Central Japan Railway Company (JR Central) in Japan.

== Overview ==
The HC35 was developed to replace ageing KiHa 75 diesel multiple units used on services on the Takayama Main Line and Taita Line, as well as the Mie rapid service running between Nagoya and Toba stations. The type will be the first hybrid train to be deployed by JR Central on commuter services. The HC35 is planned to enter revenue service in fiscal 2028.

== Design ==
The design is based on the HC85 series used on limited-express services and the 315 series used on commuter services. JR Central states that the HC35 will offer 35% fuel savings and a reduction in greenhouse gas emissions by up to 40% over the KiHa 75.

Sets to be deployed on Mie services will feature reversible transverse seating and longitudinal seating, and sets planned for use on other services will only use longitudinal seating. Wheelchair spaces and universal-access toilets will be provided in each car.
