= Toki District, Gifu =

Former district in Gifu prefecture, Japan

35°21′N 137°11′E

Toki (土岐郡, Toki-gun) was a district located in Gifu, Japan.

The cities of Toki-all areas, Tajimi-excluding areas south of Tokigawa River, and Mizunami-excluding the former town of Toge are the areas of the former Toki District.

On January 23, 2006, the town of Kasahara merged into the city of Tajimi and therefore the district no longer exists.

== Municipal timeline ==
- April 1, 1951
  - The towns of Mizunami and Toki merged to form the town of Mizunamitoki.
  - The town of Kasahara merged into the city of Tajimi.
- April 1, 1952-Parts of the city of Tajimi broke off to create the village of Kasahara.
- August 1, 1952-The village of Kasahara gained town status for the 2nd time.
- April 1, 1954-The municipalities of Mizunamitoki, Inazu, Kamado, Oaki, Hiyoshi, and parts of Akise (Togari, Yamanouchi, Tsukiyoshi) merged with the town of Toge from Ena District, Gifu to form the city of Mizunami. The remaining parts of Akise was merged into the town of Izumi.
- February 1, 1955-The municipalities of Izumi, Tokizu, Shimoishi, Tsumagi, Dachi, Hida, Tsurusato, and Sogi were all merged to form the city of Toki.
- January 23, 2006-The town of Kasahara merged into the city of Tajimi for the 2nd time. Toki District was dissolved as a result.
