= Toki, Gifu =

Toki 土岐市
- City
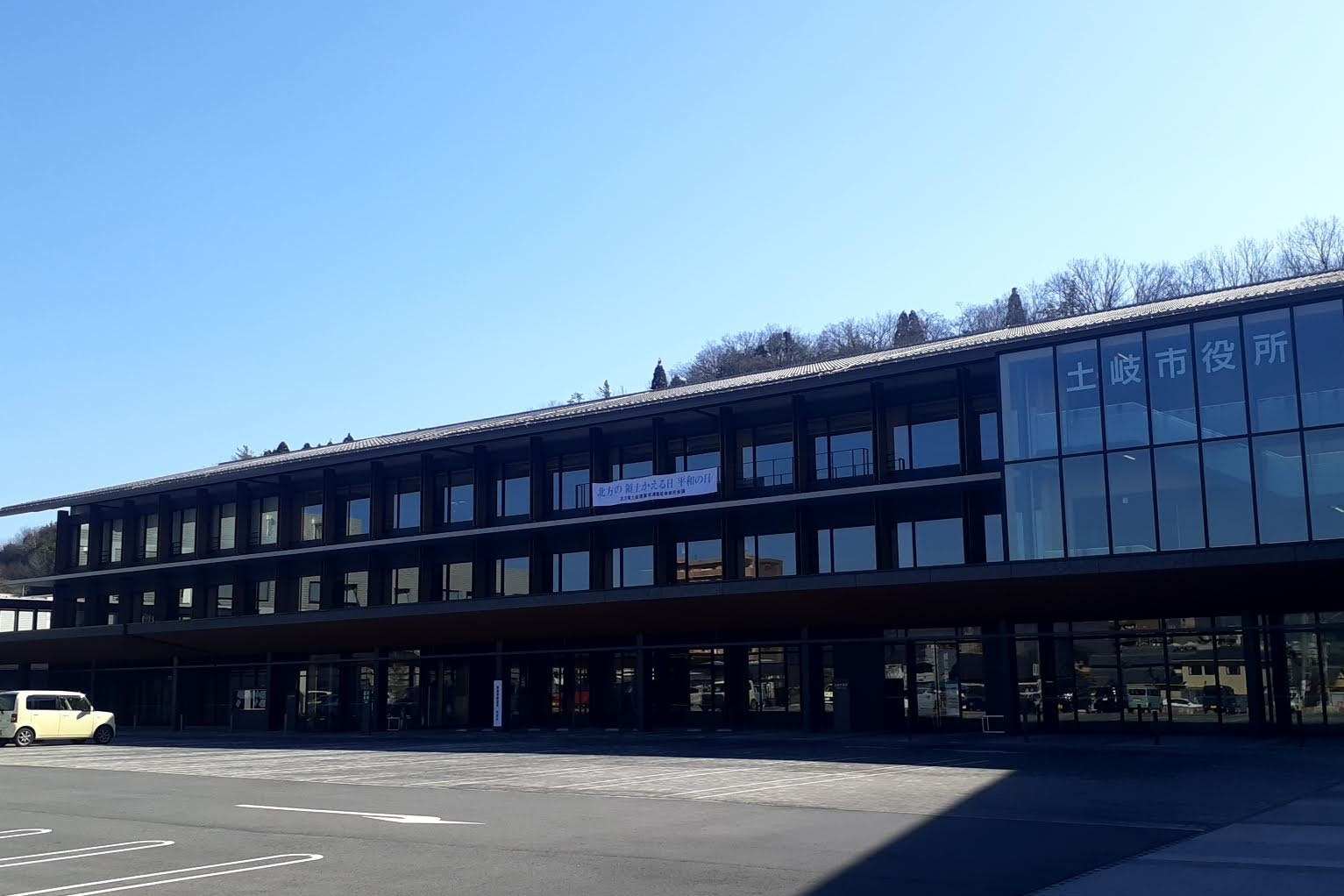
- Toki City Hall

- Flag Seal

- Location of Toki in Gifu Prefecture

- Coordinates: 35°25′9.1″N 137°10′59.7″E
- Country: Japan
- Region: Chūbu
- Prefecture: Gifu

Government
  - Mayor: Nobuhiko Ōno

Area
  - Total: 116.02 km^{2} (44.80 sq mi)

Population (December 31, 2018)
  - Total: 58,567
  - Density: 504.80/km^{2} (1,307.4/sq mi)
- Time zone: UTC+9 (Japan Standard Time)
- City symbols
- Tree: Japanese Fringetree
- Flower: Balloon flower
- Phone number: 0572-54-1111
- Address: 2101 Tokiguchi, Tokitsu-chō, Toki-shi, Gifu-ken 509-5192
- Website: Official website

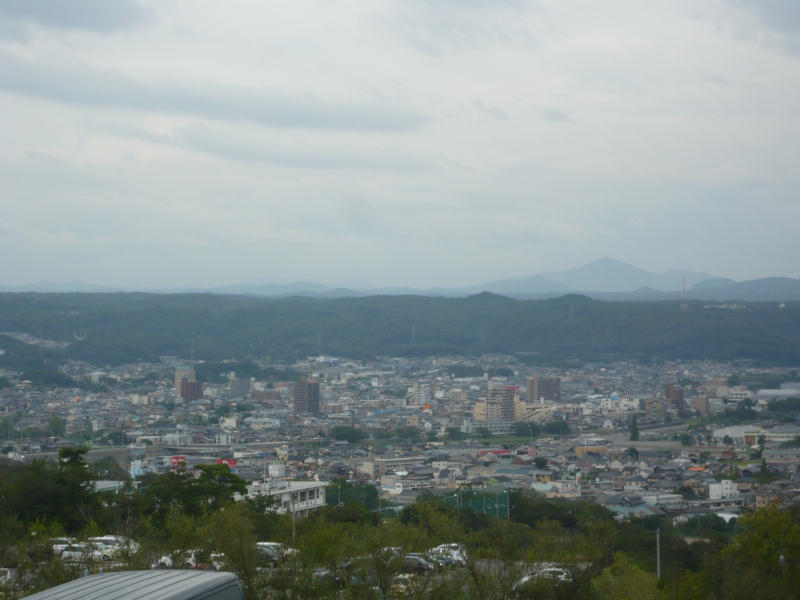
View of Toki city

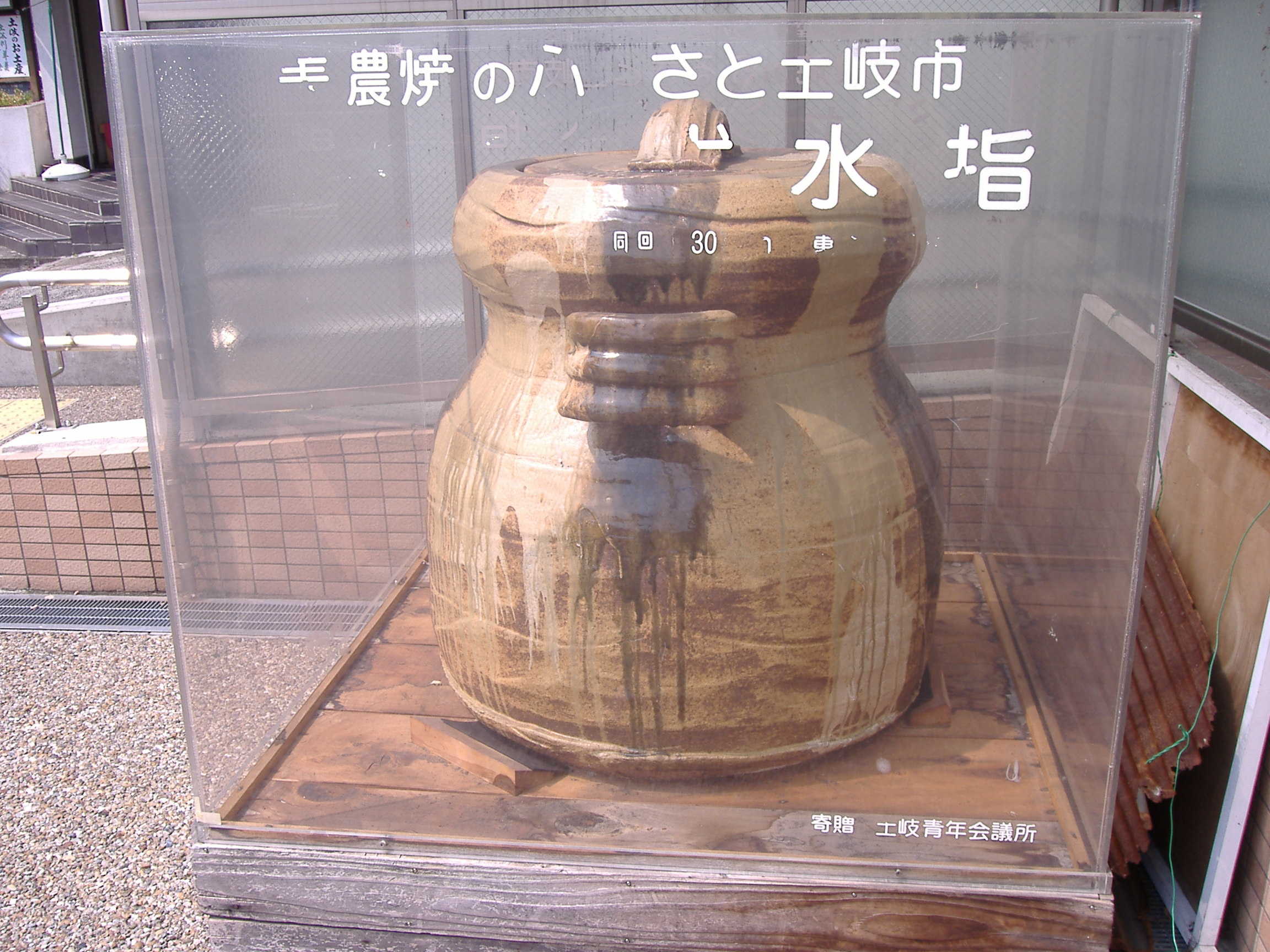
Huge Mino ware mizusashi (water jar) at Toki-shi Station

Toki (土岐市, Toki-shi) is a city located in Gifu, Japan. As of 31 January 2018, the city had an estimated population of 58,567 in 24,485 households, and a population density of 500 persons per km^{2}. The total area of the city was 117.01 square kilometres (45.18 sq mi). Toki is known as one of the largest producers of Japanese pottery, generally referred to as Mino ware.

== Geography ==
Toki is located in southern Gifu Prefecture, to the southeast of Gifu City and approximately 30 kilometers north of Nagoya. The Toki River runs through the downtown area. Mount Mikuni is the highest point in the city, with an elevation of 701 metres (2,300 ft).

=== Climate ===
The city has a climate characterized by hot and humid summers, and mild winters (Köppen climate classification Cfa). The average annual temperature in Toki is 14.9 °C. The average annual rainfall is 1902 mm with September as the wettest month. The temperatures are highest on average in August, at around 27.5 °C, and lowest in January, at around 3.2 °C.

=== Neighbouring municipalities ===
- Aichi Prefecture
  - Seto
  - Toyota
- Gifu Prefecture
  - Kani
  - Mitake
  - Mizunami
  - Tajimi

== Demographics ==
Per Japanese census data, the population of Toki has declined gradually over the past 40 years.

Historical population
Year	Pop.	±%
1970	60,786	—
1980	65,038	+7.0%
1990	64,946	−0.1%
2000	63,283	−2.6%
2010	60,475	−4.4%
2020	55,348	−8.5%

== History ==
The area around Toki was part of traditional Mino Province. The history of pottery making in Toki area appears to have started more than 1300 years ago, with of Mino ware dating to the 16th century during the Azuchi-Momoyama period. During the Edo period, much of the area was tenryō territory under the direct control of Tokugawa shogunate. In the post-Meiji restoration cadastral reforms, Toki District in Gifu Prefecture was created, and the village of Tokiguchi was established on July 1, 1889 by the creation of the modern municipalities system. It was raised to town status on November 5, 1889 and was renamed Tokitsu. The city of Toki was incorporated on February 1, 1955, with the area formerly divided among 5 towns (Tokitsu, Oroshi, Tsumagi, Dachi, and Izumi) and 3 villages (Tsurusato, Sogi and Hida). In January 2004, a referendum held to decide whether Toki should merge with its neighboring municipalities, the cities and town of Tajimi, Mizunami and Kasahara, failed to obtain majority support.

== Government ==
Toki has a mayor-council form of government with a directly elected mayor and a unicameral city legislature of 18 members.

=== Mayor ===
The current mayor of Toki is Yasunari Katō. Previous mayors include:

- Nobuhiko Ōno ( -2012)
- Yasuo Tsukamoto (1983–2007)
- Okizo Mizuno (1975–1983)
- Yasunori Ninomiya (1955–1975)

== Economy ==
Toki is increasingly a bedroom community for nearby Gifu and Nagoya. The city is known for its production of ceramics. In Spring 2005, a luxury outlet mall with many name-brand stores, called Toki Premium Outlets, was opened on the outskirts of the city. Besides pottery, this outlet mall is one of the biggest tourist spots. The city is home to the Large Helical Device, a stellarator investigating plasma physics with an eye towards fusion power generation.

== Education ==
Toki has eight public elementary schools and six public middle schools operated by the city government. The city has three public high schools operated by the Gifu Prefectural Board of Education.

== Transportation ==
=== Railway ===
- - JR Central - Chūō Main Line
  - Tokishi

=== Highway ===
- Chūō Expressway
- Tōkai-Kanjō Expressway
- National Route 19
- National Route 21
- National Route 363

== Sister cities ==
Domestic

- Yaizu, Shizuoka Prefecture, since October 10, 1978, as a sports sister city

International

- Faenza, Emilia-Romagna, Italy, since October 23, 1979
