= Eihō-ji =

Buddhist temple in Gifu Prefecture, Japan

Eihō-ji 永保寺
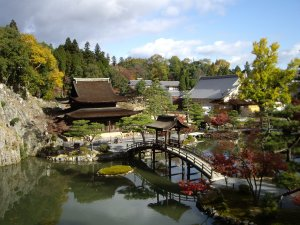
- Gardens of Eihō-ji

- Location within Gifu Prefecture Location within Japan

Religion
- Affiliation: Buddhist
- Deity: Sho-Kannon
- Rite: Rinzai Zen

Location
- Location: 1-40 Kokeizan-chō, Tajimi-shi, Gifu-ken
- Country: Japan
- Coordinates: 35°20′48″N 137°07′49″E

Architecture
- Founder: Muso Kokushi
- Completed: 1313

Website
- Official website

Eihō-ji (永保寺) is a Rinzai Zen Buddhist temple located in northern area of the city of Tajimi, Gifu Prefecture, Japan. Founded in the Kamakura period, two of the structures of the temple are designated National Treasures of Japan and its gardens are a nationally designated Place of Scenic Beauty.

== History ==
Eihō-ji was established in 1313 by the Nanzen-ji branch of Rinzai Zen Buddhism. On September 10, 2003, one of the main living quarters was destroyed by a fire. After a fundraising campaign run by the residents of Tajimi, the restoration was completed on August 29, 2007.

The temple grounds are home to a number of zazen trainees, and the temple holds regular zazen sessions open to the general public. In addition to two buildings listed as National Treasures of Japan, the grounds include a pond, bridge and waterfall, and a traditional Zen garden.

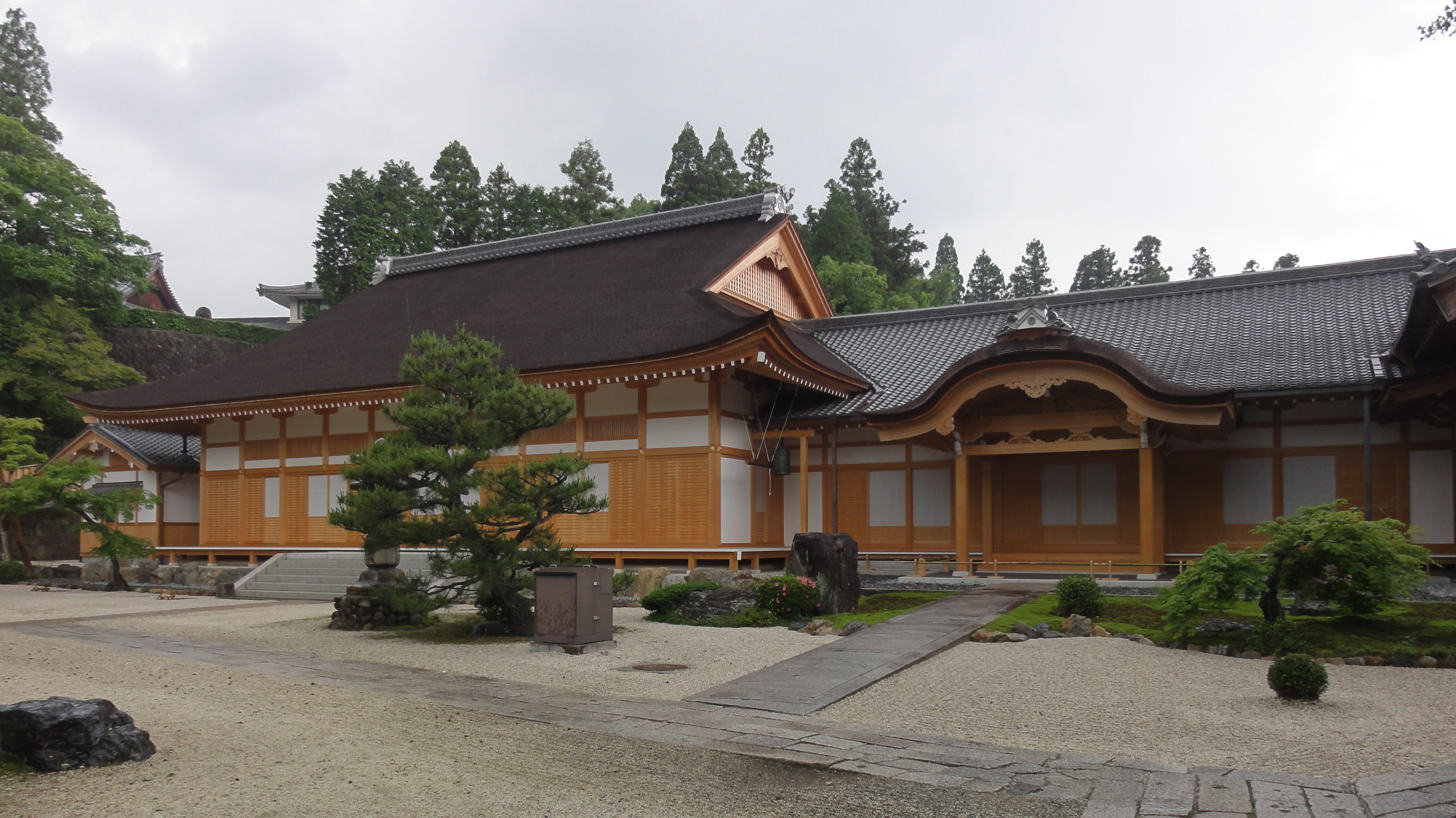
The Mahavira Hall of Eihō-ji.

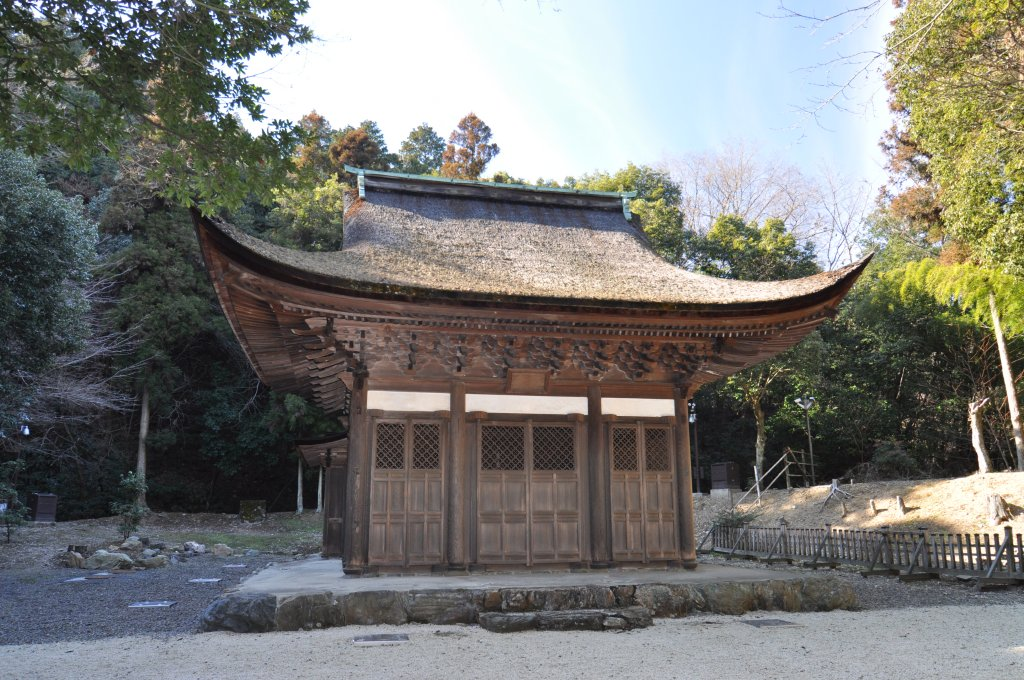
Kokeizan Kannon-do (National Treasure)

== See also ==
- Glossary of Japanese Buddhism.
