= Kokokei Station =

Railway station in Tajimi, Gifu Prefecture, Japan

CF11 Kokokei Station 古虎渓駅
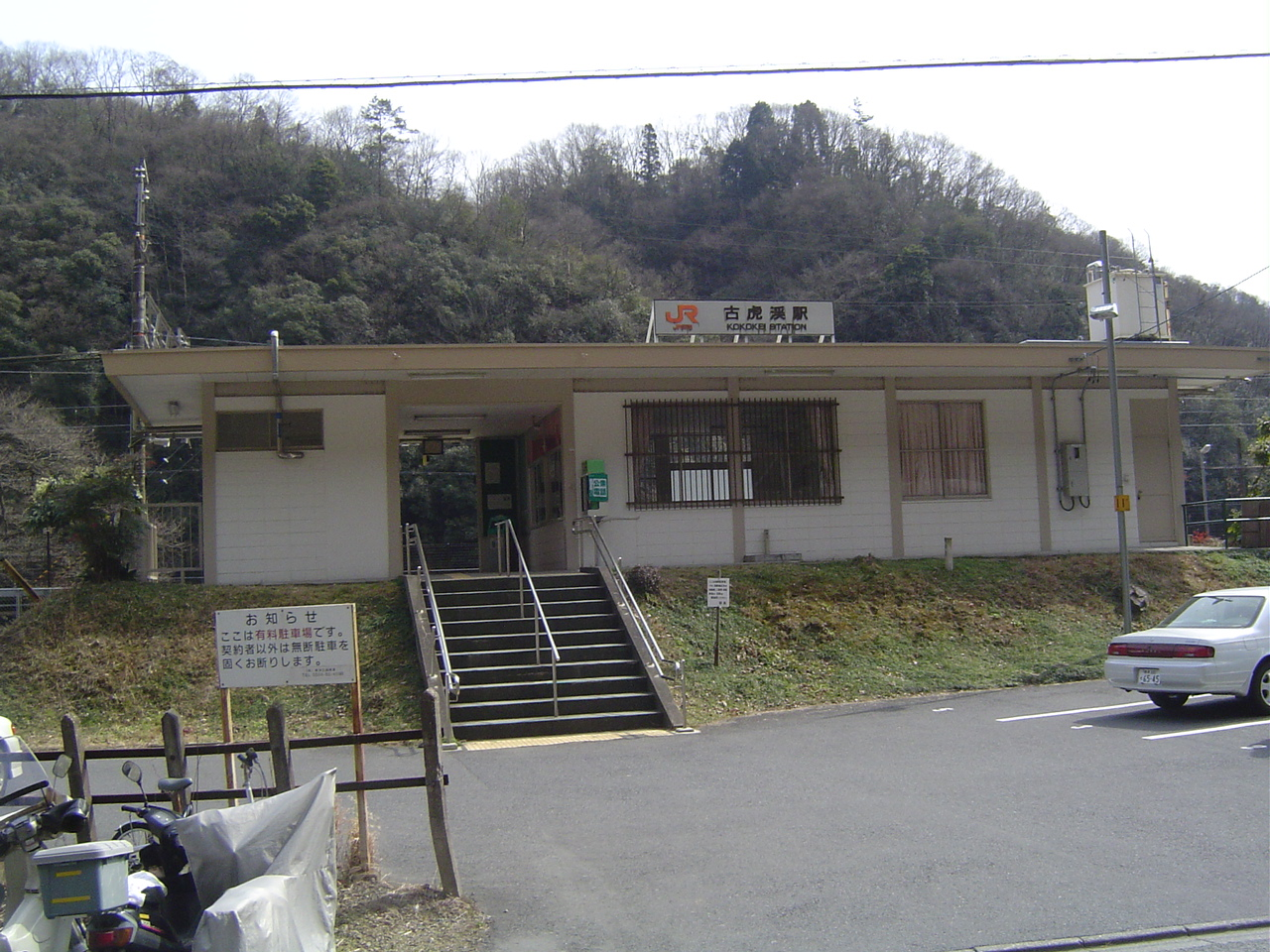
- Kokokei Station in March 2008

General information
- Location: Suwa-cho Kanda, Tajimi-shi, Gifu-ken 507-0044; Japan
- Coordinates: 35°18′12″N 137°6′4″E
- Operator: JR Central
- Line: Chūō Main Line
- Distance: 363.3 km from Tokyo
- Platforms: 2 side platforms
- Tracks: 2

Other information
- Status: Staffed
- Station code: CF11

History
- Opened: 1 November 1952

Passengers
- FY2015: 485 daily
Location
- Location within Gifu Prefecture Location within Japan

Kokokei Station (古虎渓駅, Kokokei-eki) is a railway station in the city of Tajimi, Gifu Prefecture, Japan, operated by Central Japan Railway Company (JR Tōkai).

== Lines ==
Kokokei Station is served by the JR Tōkai Chūō Main Line, and is located 363.3 kilometers from the official starting point of the line at Tokyo and 31.6 kilometers from Nagoya.

== Layout ==
The station has two ground-level side platforms connected by a footbridge. The station is staffed.

=== Platforms ===
1	■ Chūō Main Line	For Tajimi and Nakatsugawa
2	■ Chūō Main Line	For Nagoya

== Adjacent stations ==
«	Service	»
JR Central
Chūō Main Line
Home Liner: Does not stop at this station
Central Liner: Does not stop at this station
Rapid: Does not stop at this station
Tajimi	Local	Jōkōji

== History ==
Kokukei Station began as the Ikeda Signal Stop (池田信号場, Ikeda shingōsho) on 1 April 1940. It was opened as a full passenger station on 1 November 1952 as part of Japan National Railways. Between Kokokei Station and Jōkōji Station, the line runs through the Aigi Tunnel. This opened in 1966, as part of the doubling and electrification of the railway, replacing a series of tunnels on a route that ran closer to the edge of the river. On 1 April 1987, it became part of JR Tōkai.

== Passenger statistics ==
In fiscal 2015, the station was used by an average of 485 passengers daily (boarding passengers only).

== Surrounding area ==
- Shōnai River

== See also ==
- List of railway stations in Japan
