= Mount Mikuni (Gifu) =

Mountains in Gifu Prefecture, Japan

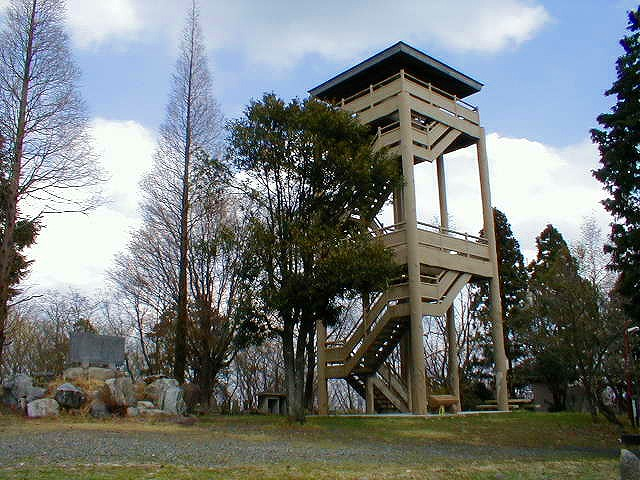
An observation deck on Mount Mikuni on the border of Gifu and Aichi

Mount Mikuni (三国山, Mikuni-yama) is the name of three mountains in Gifu Prefecture, Japan. One of the mountains is on the border of Gifu and Aichi prefectures. Another mountain is on the border of Gifu and Nagano prefectures. The third mountain is located on the border of all three prefectures. All three mountains are included in this article.

== Gifu and Aichi ==
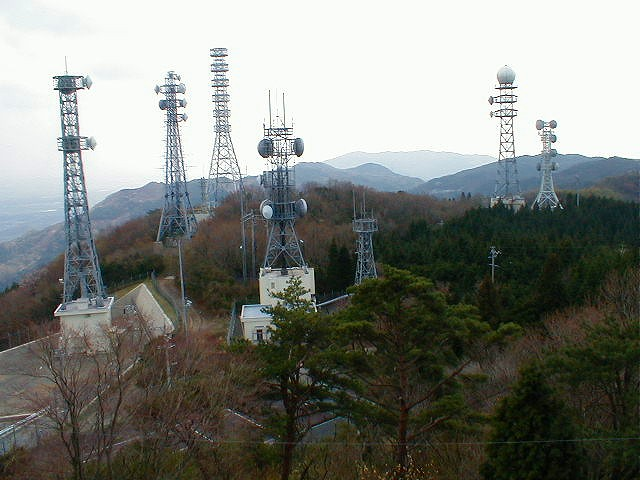
Antennas on Mount Mikuni on the border of Gifu and Aichi

The Mount Mikuni separating Gifu and Aichi prefectures is located in Gifu's Toki and Aichi's Toyota. It is 701 m (2,300 ft) in height and received its name because it was located on the border of the former provinces of Mino, Owari and Mikawa.

A four-story observation deck, a prefectural park and camp grounds are located on top of the mountain. The park has an area of 15 km^{2} (6 sq mi). There are no other tall mountains nearby, so many visitors come to the park at night because the observation deck offers a good view of the surrounding Nōbi Plain. The summit can be reached by car and is about 3 km (2 mi) from Route 363. A small road through the forest begins in the city of Toyota.

Aichi International Broadcasting Co. has antennas near the mountain peak. Other digital broadcasters also had antennas on the top of the mountain, but spillover from the competing signals caused problems. To solve the problem, a new tower was built in Seto and the signals do not interfere with each other anymore.

Coordinates: 35°15′16.9″N 137°11′24.7″E

== Gifu and Nagano ==
The Mount Mikuni separating Gifu and Nagano prefectures is located in Gifu's Gero and Nakatsugawa and Nagano's Ōtaki, Kiso District. It is 1,611 m (5,285 ft) in height and is part of the Adera Mountains (阿寺山地 Adera Sanchi). It received its name because it was located on the border of the former provinces of Hida, Mino and Shinano. It is also one of "Gifu's 100 Mountains." The kanji for this mountain are sometimes read as Mount Sangoku (三国山 Sangoku-san).

Coordinates: 35°47′46″N 137°21′37.5″E

== Gifu, Aichi and Nagano ==
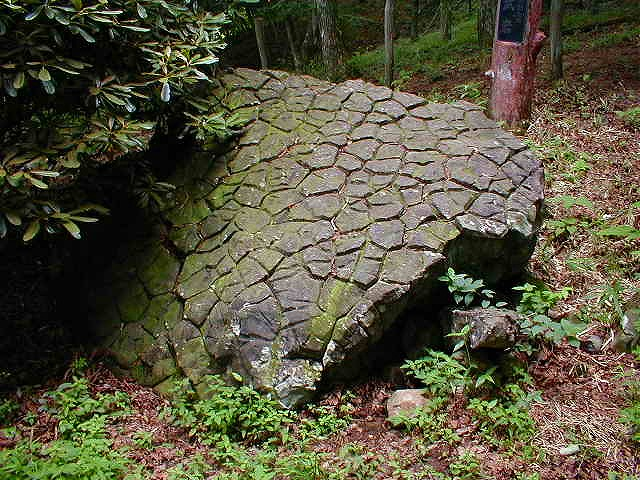
"Turtle shell stones" on Mount Mikuni on the border of all three prefectures

The Mount Mikuni separating the three prefectures is located in Gifu's Ena; Nagano's Neba, Shimoina District; and Aichi's Toyota. It is 1,162 m (3,812 ft) in height and received its name because it was located on the border of the former provinces of Mino, Shinano and Mikawa.

The Aichi Prefecture side of the mountain is home to Nagoya Kōchin (名古屋コーチン), a regional breed of chicken. There is also a dirt track for car racing on the mountain. During the Miocene Epoch, the mountain was an active volcano and caused the "turtle shell stones" (亀甲岩 kikkōiwa), which are a natural treasure of the village of Neba.

Coordinates: 35°17′21.4″N 137°33′40.6″E
