= Kasahara, Gifu =

Dissolved municipality in Gifu prefecture, Japan

Map of Kasahara, Gifu

Kasahara (笠原町, Kasahara-chō) was a town located in Toki District, Gifu Prefecture, Japan.

As of 2003, the town has an estimated population of 11,309 and a density of 840.82 persons per km^{2}. The total area is 13.45 km^{2}.

On January 23, 2006, Kasahara was merged into the expanded city of Tajimi.

== History ==
=== Municipal Timeline ===
- July 1, 1889 - Founded as a village
- October 10, 1923 - Elevated to town status
- April 1, 1951 - All areas were merged into the city of Tajimi, the town of Kasahara was dissolved
- April 1, 1952 - The village of Kasahara was founded for the 2nd time after all areas (excluding the locality of Takiro ) broke off from the city of Tajimi.
- August 1, 1952 - Gained town status for the 2nd time.
- July 1, 2002 - The Toyo-Seibu Merger Committee was held at Ceratopia Toki in the city of Toki.
- January 25, 2004 - The merger related election was held by Three cities and a town (Toki, Tajimi, Mizunami, and Kasahara from Toki District) and the town voted yes to the merger but three cities voted no. But all three cities are related to the former Toki District but they ended up finding there loophole. At that time, the election for the city's new name was also held, and Tono was selected as their new city's name beating Tokigawa, Oribe, Toto, Yoshisara, their new city hall was also selected (within the city of Toki), but the city of Tono became a legend.

東濃西部合併協議会

- March 2005 - With the help from the governor of Gifu Prefecture, The city of Tajimi and Tajimi Industrial Committee was able to rename one of the interchange at Tokai Hokuriku Expressway-"Tokiminami-Tajimi." The city of Toki was very upset with this renaming, and the creation of the new city in the Toyo-Seibu region became serious.
- January 23, 2006 - Kasahara was officially merged into the expanded city of Tajimi for the 2nd time.
