= Mino ware =

Type of Japanese pottery

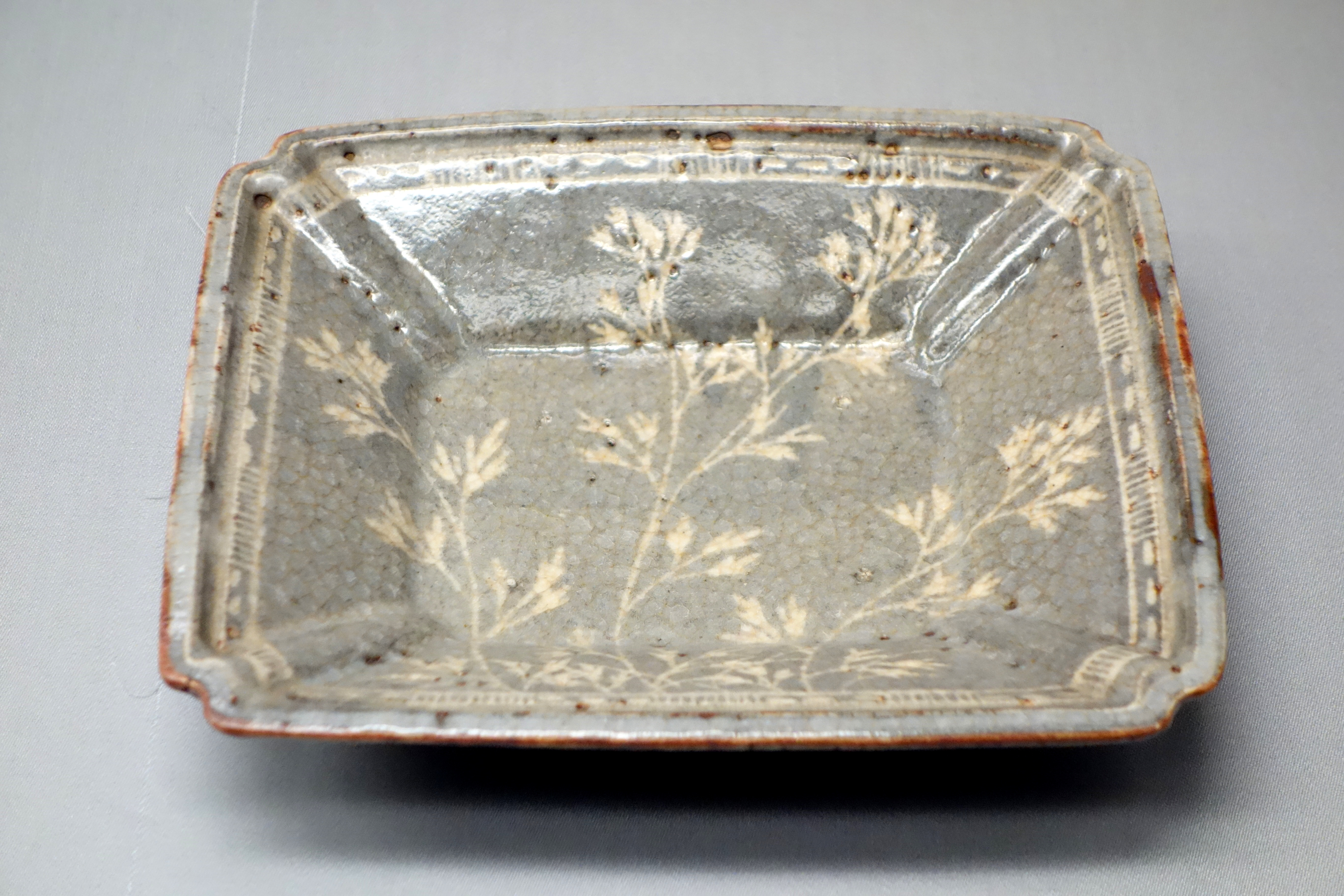
Mino ware square dish with autumn grasses design, grey Nezumi-Shino type, Azuchi-Momoyama to Edo period, 16th–17th century

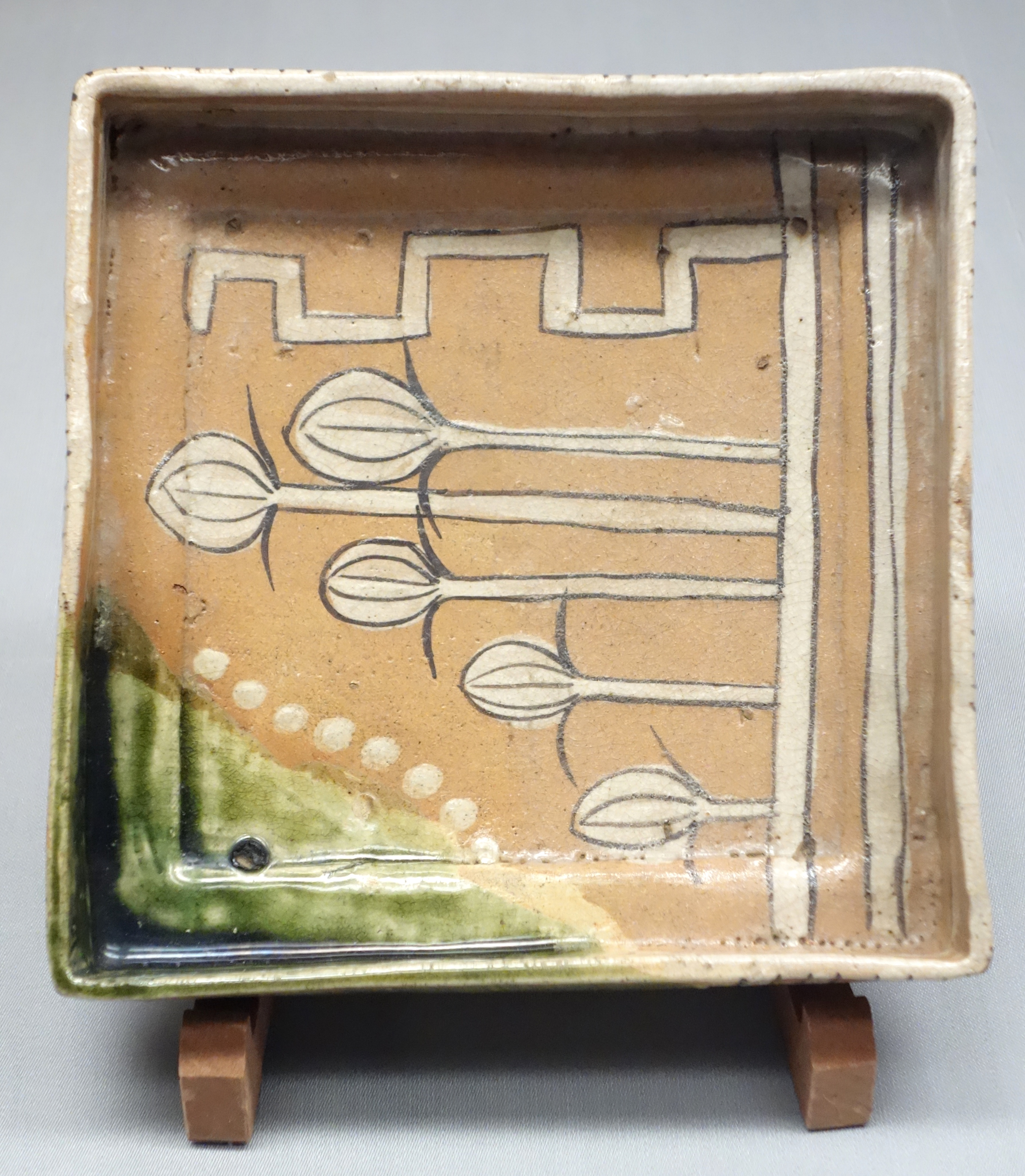
Mino ware cornered bowl in Oribe type, Edo period, 17th century

Mino ware (美濃焼, Mino-yaki) is a style of Japanese pottery, stoneware, and ceramics that is produced in Mino Province, mainly in the cities of Tajimi, Toki, Mizunami, and Kani in Gifu Prefecture, central Japan.

== History ==
The history of Japanese pottery in the Toki area appears to have started more than 1,300 years ago. Some kiln traces and earthenware pieces, which are in the 7th-century style, have been recovered within the territory of the city. Craftsmen around the Seto area fled during wars before the Azuchi–Momoyama period (1568–1614) and settled in the region. They were under the protection of the lords of Toki. The pottery was founded by Katō Yosabei, whose sons also started other potteries in the area. The technical merit and artistic impression reached new heights when crockery for tea ceremony had been produced there.

Under the guidance of lord Furuta Oribe, the Oribe ware developed as a variation of it. Daimyō feudal lords highly admired such tea vessels, bowls, pots and utensils with unique styles of oribe. More emphasis has been put on daily necessities since the early Edo period (1603–1867).

Certain Mino kilns also produced Ofukei ware.

With the introduction of mass production introduced in the Meiji period (1868–1912), Mino ware became widely available. Ceramics from the Mino region amount to around 50% of Japanese pottery produced.

== Styles ==
Throughout the centuries, four styles of Mino were developed that differ from each other in appearance. These have strong connections to tea ceremony:

- Ki-Seto ware: style is yellow.
- Setoguro ware: style is black.
- Shino ware: style is often grey with autumn grasses in white as a prominent theme. This result is achieved by incising through a slip of iron oxide and covering with feldspar glaze. In the oven, the fire would bring out variations in colour through the uneven glaze. Sub-styles are Muji-Shino, E-Shino, Beni-Shino, Aka-Shino, and Nezumi-Shino.
- Oribe ware: style is green and black. Sub-styles are Ao-Oribe, So-Oribe, Aka-Oribe, Narumi-Oribe, Shino-Oribe, and Kuro-Oribe.
