= KiHa 75 =

Japanese train type

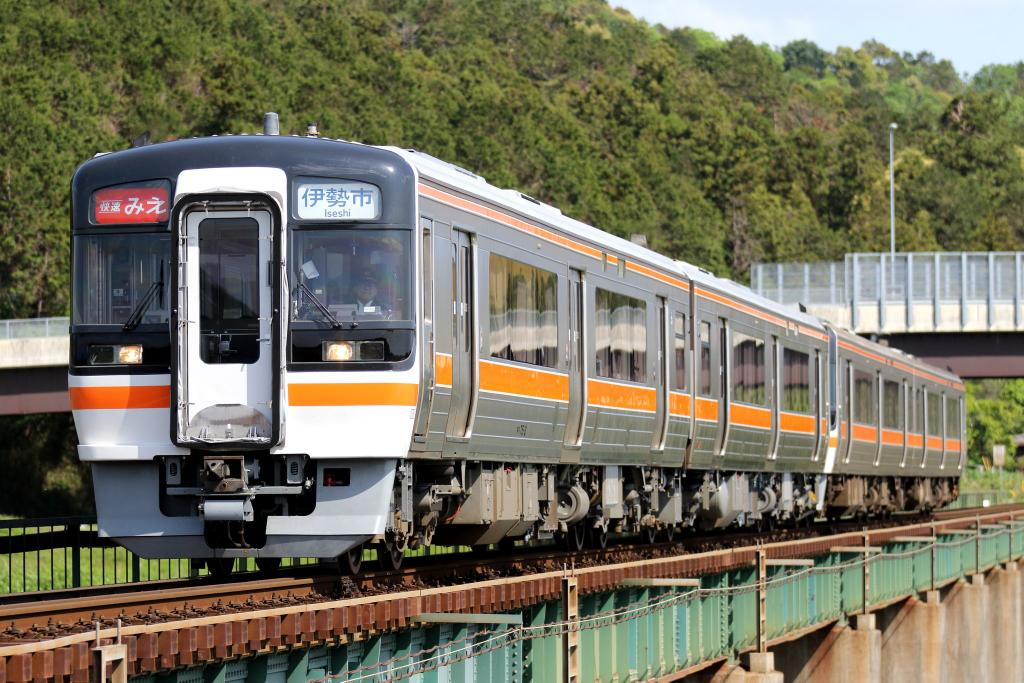
- KiHa 75 on a Mie rapid service, May 2019
- In service: 1993–present
- Manufacturer: Nippon Sharyo
- Replaced: KiHa 58/65 series
- Constructed: 1993–1999
- Entered service: 1 August 1993
- Number built: 40 vehicles (20 sets)
- Number in service: 40 vehicles (20 sets)
- Successor: HC35 series
- Formation: 2 cars per set
- Operator: JR Central
- Depot: Nagoya
- Lines served: Kansai Main Line; Sangū Line; Kisei Main Line; Takayama Line; Taita Line; Ise Line

Specifications
- Car body construction: Stainless steel
- Car length: 20,800 mm (68 ft 3 in)
- Width: 2,900 mm (9 ft 6 in)
- Height: 3,630 mm (11 ft 11 in)
- Doors: Three pairs per side
- Maximum speed: 120 km/h (75 mph)
- Prime mover: C-DMF14HZB x2(Cummins N14 Series)
- Power output: 350 hp per engine
- Transmission: C-DW14A (hydraulic)
- Bogies: C-DT60 (KiHa 75-0/100), C-DT60B (KiHa 75-200/300/400/500)
- Track gauge: 1,067 mm (3 ft 6 in)

The KiHa 75 (キハ75形) is a diesel multiple unit (DMU) train type operated by Central Japan Railway Company (JR Central) on Local, Rapid and Rapid Mie services in Japan since 1993. They were also formerly used for the Kasuga Express service until it was discontinued in March 2006.

The "KiHa" designation derives from the classification system used by JNR. "Ki" indicates a diesel-powered vehicle, while "Ha" indicates an ordinary passenger car, as opposed to a green car.

== Variants ==
A total of 40 cars were built, operating as 2-car sets, with the class divided into three sub-classes: KiHa 75-0/100, KiHa 75-200/300, and KiHa 75-400/500.

- KiHa 75-0/100: 6 x 2-car sets delivered June - July 1993
- KiHa 75-200/300: 8 x 2-car sets delivered February 1999
- KiHa 75-400/500: 6 x 2-car sets delivered February - March 1999, driver-only operation

== KiHa 75-0 + KiHa 75-100 ==
Twelve cars formed as six 2-car sets were delivered from Nippon Sharyo to Nagoya Depot in June and July 1993. These entered service from the start of the revised timetable on 1 August 1993 on Mie rapid services, replacing ageing KiHa 58 and 65 series DMUs.

=== Formation ===
Designation	Mc1	Mc2
Numbering	KiHa 75-0	KiHa 75-100
Weight (t)	38.5	37.8
Capacity (Total/seated)	129/52	134/56

=== Interior ===
The KiHa 75-0 cars have a universal access toilet, and were also initially equipped with a card-operated payphone, but this was subsequently removed. Seating consists of transverse flip-over seats arranged 2+2 abreast.

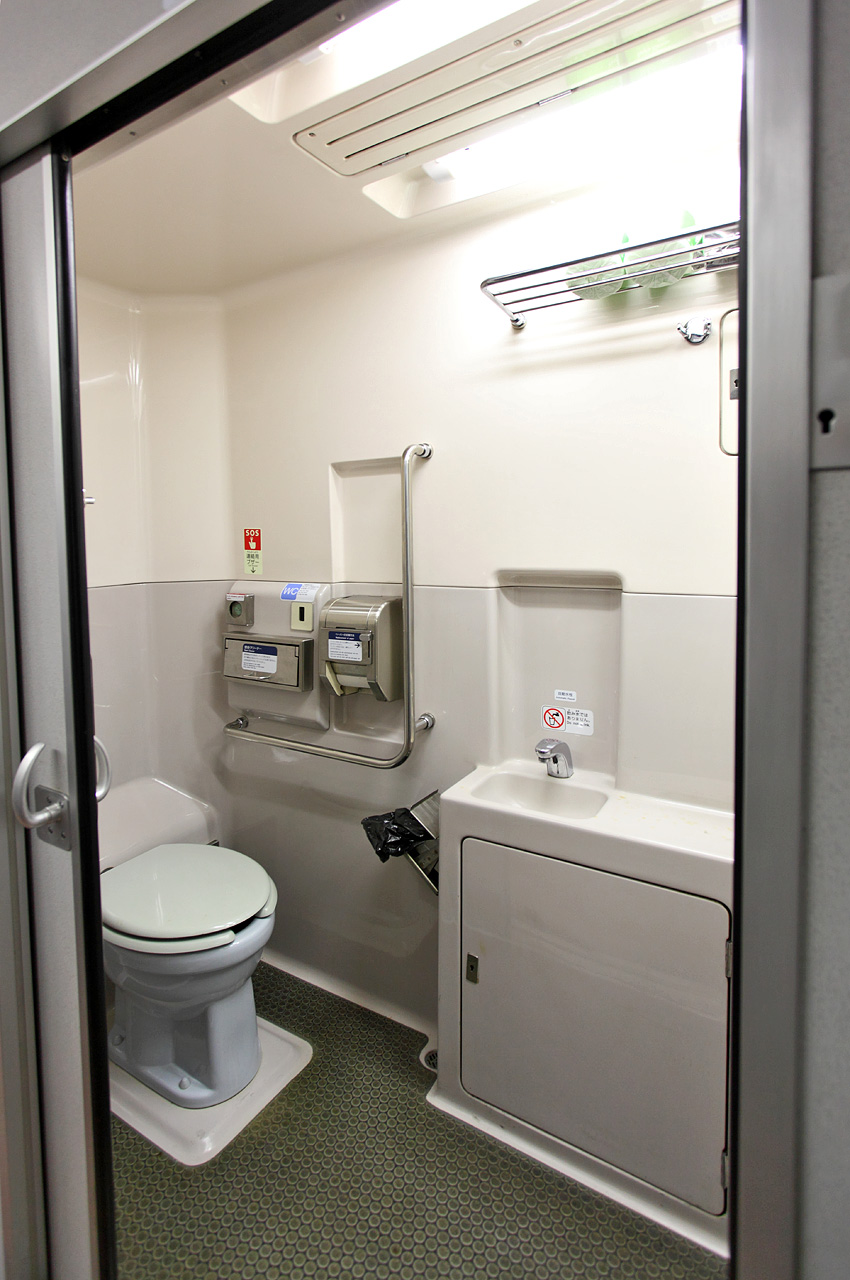
Wheelchair-accessible toilet in car KiHa 75-4, March 2009

== KiHa 75-200 + KiHa 75-300 ==
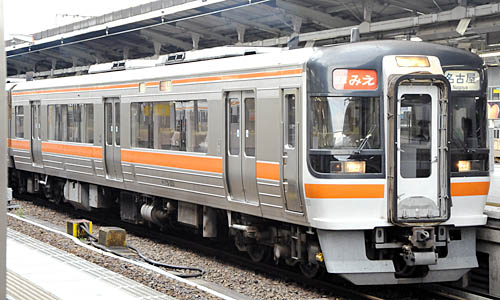
KiHa 75-301 at Nagoya Station, April 2011

Sixteen cars formed as eight 2-car sets were delivered from Nippon Sharyo to Nagoya Depot in February 1999. These featured a number of minor changes compared with the earlier KiHa 75-0/100 sets. Externally, an additional set of headlights was included above the end gangway connections.

=== Formation ===
Numbering	KiHa 75-200	KiHa 75-300
Weight (t)	40.2	39.4
Capacity (Total/seated)	133/52	138/56

=== Interior ===
The KiHa 75-200 cars have a universal access toilet, and were also initially equipped with a card-operated payphone, but this was subsequently removed. The seating was the same design as that used on 313 series EMUs, still arranged in a transverse 2+2 abreast configuration.

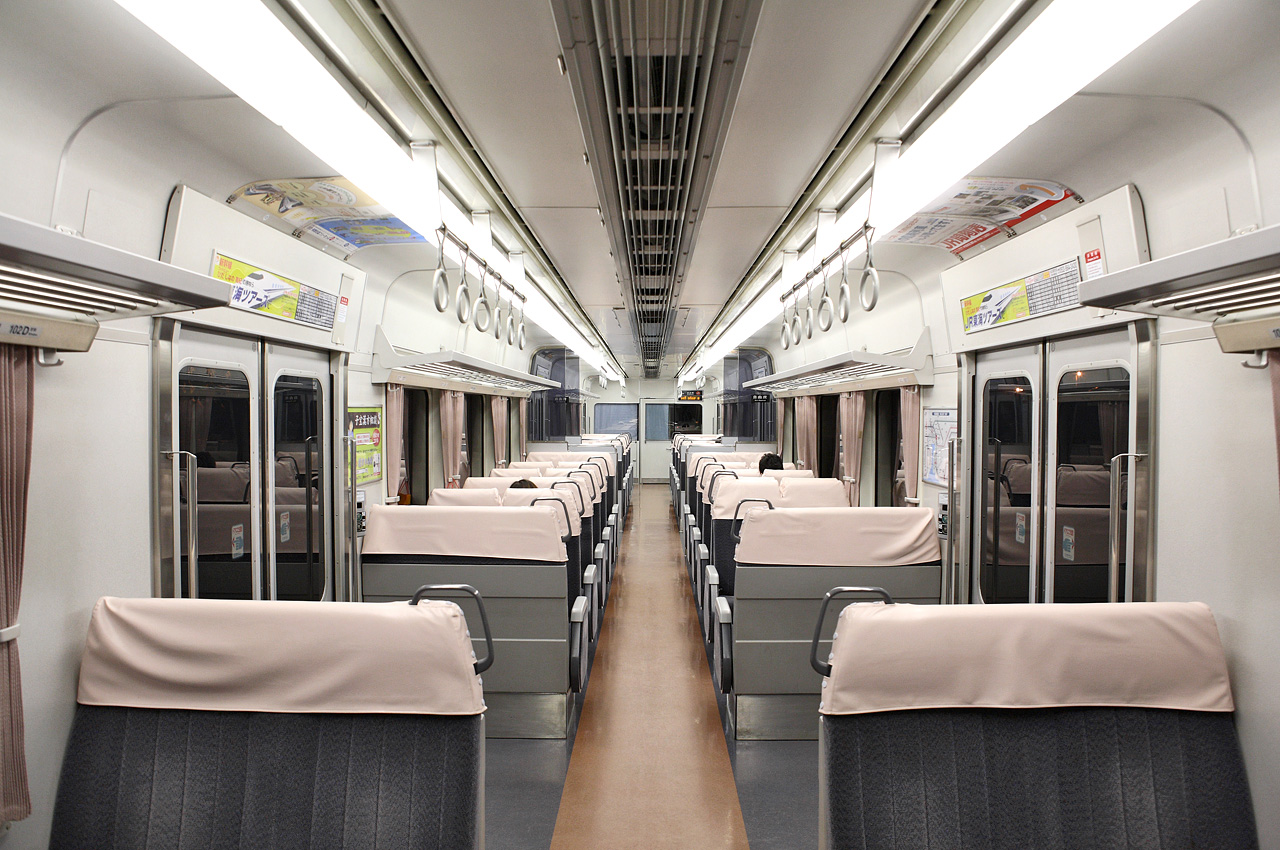
Interior view of car KiHa 75-306, December 2008

== KiHa 75-400 + KiHa 75-500 ==
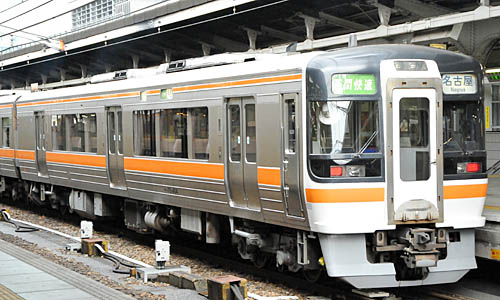
KiHa 75-404 at Nagoya Station, April 2011

Twelve more cars formed as six 2-car sets were delivered from Nippon Sharyo to Nagoya Depot in February and March 1999. These were broadly similar to the KiHa 75-200/300 sets delivered at the same time, but were equipped for wanman driver only operation.

=== Formation ===
The KiHa 75-400/500 sets are formed as follows.

Numbering	KiHa 75-400	KiHa 75-500
Weight (t)	40.4	39.6
Capacity (Total/seated)	131/52	135/56

=== Interior ===
The KiHa 75-400 cars have a universal access toilet. Unlike the earlier sets, these cars were not fitted with a card-operated payphone.

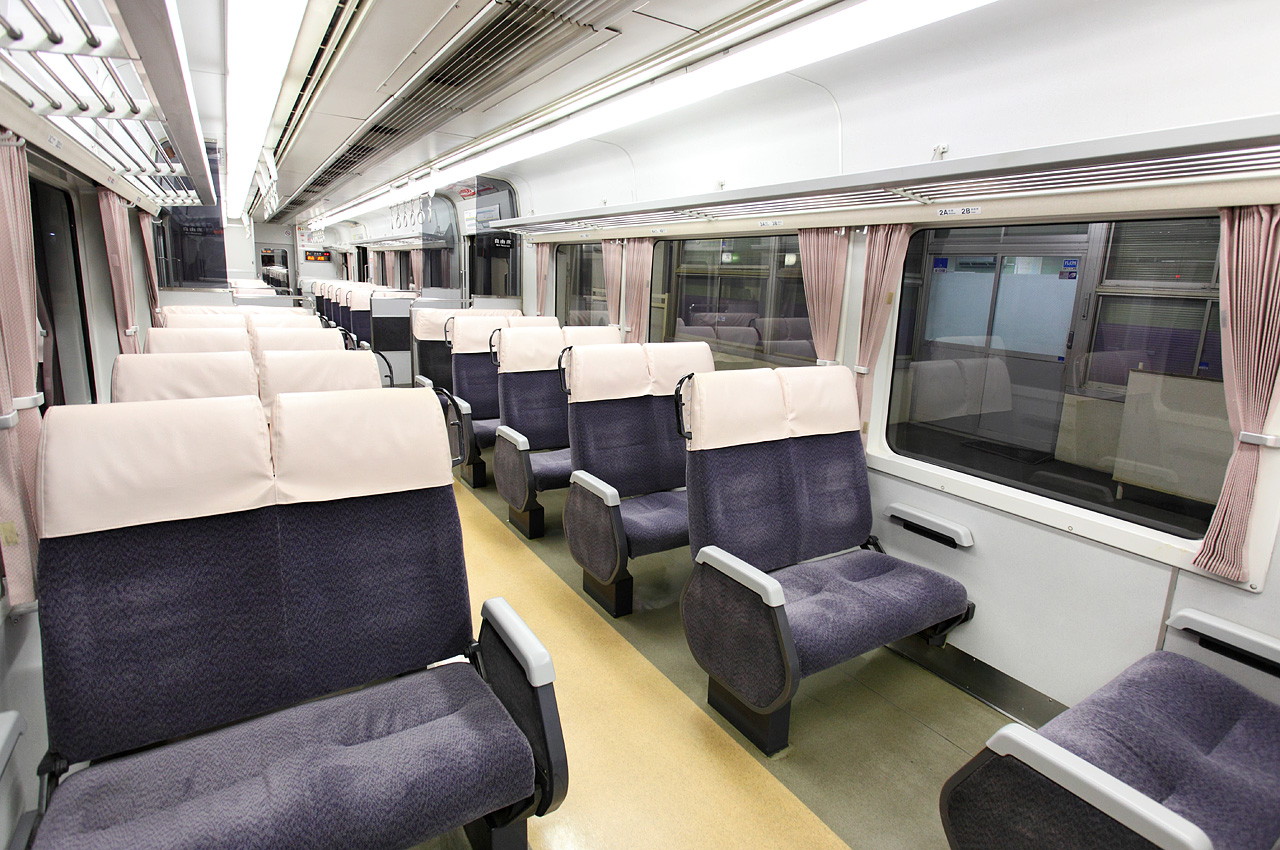
Interior of car KiHa 75-403, March 2009

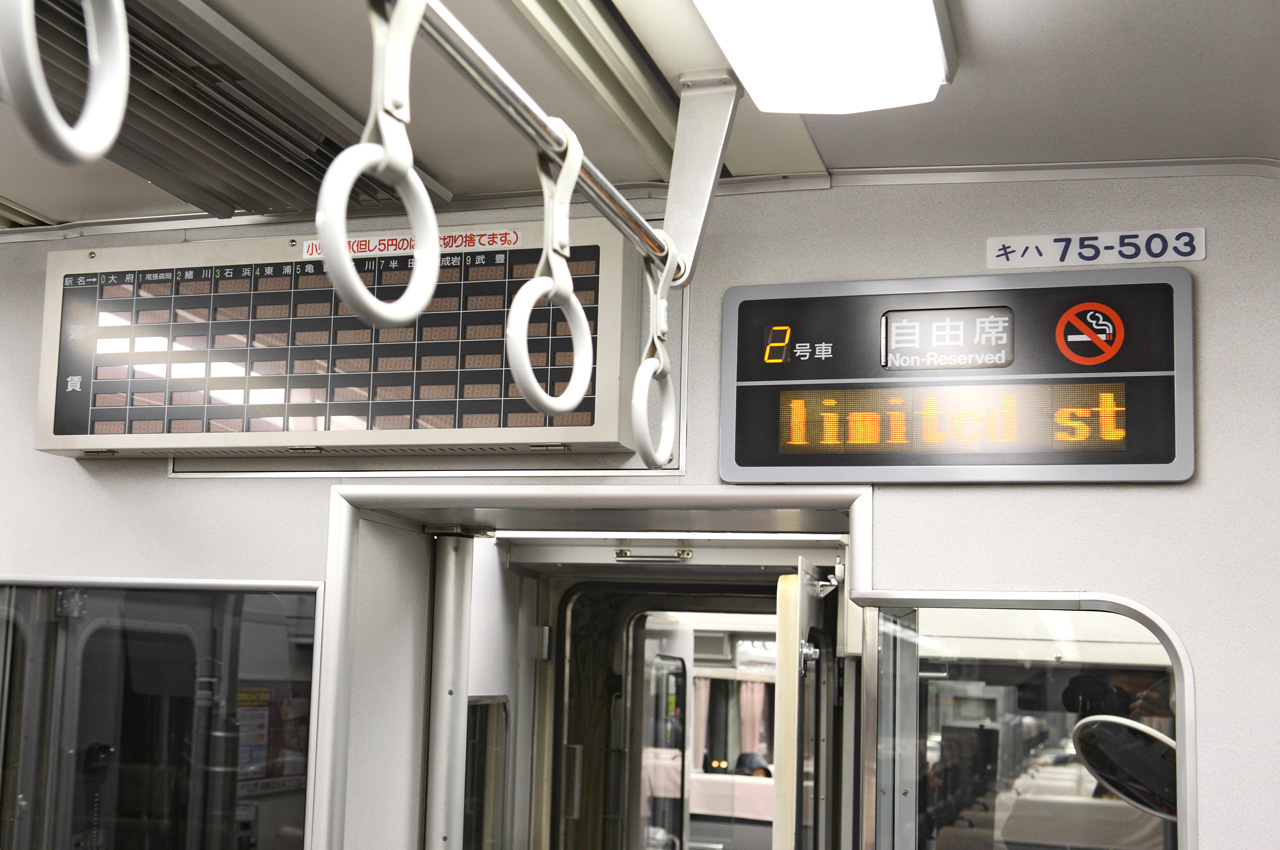
Fare indicator panel of car KiHa 75-503, December 2008

== Future plans ==
On 10 September 2025, JR Central announced plans to replace the KiHa 75 fleet with new HC35 series hybrid trains from 2028.
