= Kani Station =

Railway station in Kani, Gifu Prefecture, Japan

CI02 Kani Station 可児駅
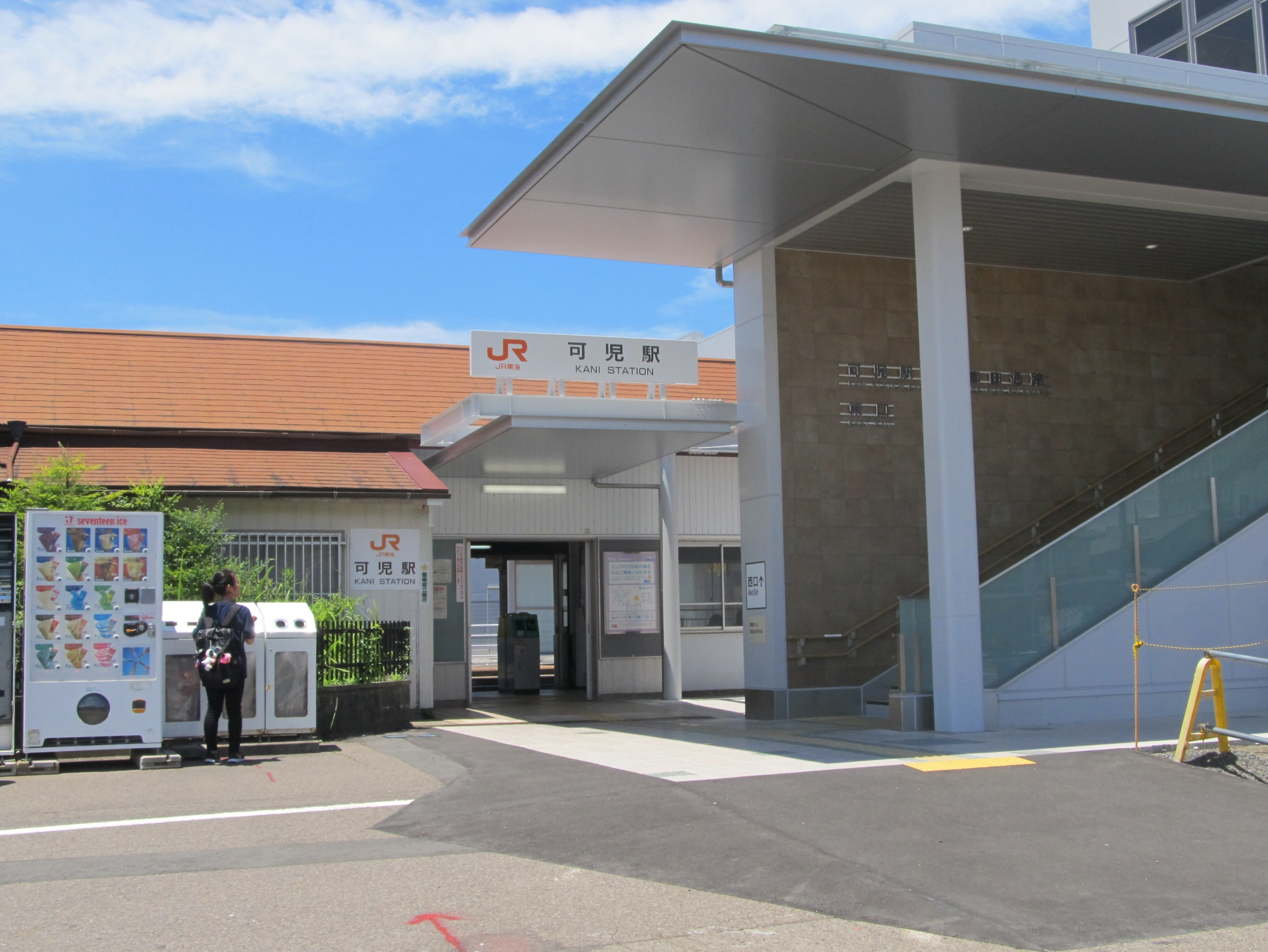
- Kani Station in June 2018

General information
- Location: Nemoto-cho 3-chome, Kani-shi, Gifu-ken 509-0203; Japan
- Coordinates: 35.4227°N 137.0555°E
- Operator: JR Central
- Line: Taita Line
- Distance: 12.8 km from Tajimi
- Platforms: 2 side platforms
- Tracks: 2

Other information
- Status: Staffed (Midori no Madoguchi)
- Station code: CI02

History
- Opened: December 28, 1918
- Former names: Hiromi (to 1982)

Passengers
- FY2015: 1485 daily
Location
- Location within Gifu Prefecture Location within Japan

Kani Station (可児駅, Kani-eki) is a railway station on the Taita Line in the city of Kani, Gifu Prefecture, Japan, operated by Central Japan Railway Company (JR Tōkai).

== Lines ==
Kani Station is served by the Taita Line, and is located 12.8 rail kilometers from the official starting point of the line at Tajimi.

== Station layout ==
Kani Station has two opposed ground-level side platforms connected to the station building by a footbridge. The station has a Midori no Madoguchi staffed ticket office.

=== Platforms ===
| 1 | ■ Taita Line | For Tajimi |
| 2 | ■ Taita Line | For Mino-Ōta, Unuma, and Gifu |

== Adjacent stations ==
| « | Service | » |
JR Central
Taita Line
| Shimogiri | Local | Mino-Kawai |

== History ==
Kani Station opened on December 28, 1918 as Hiromi Station (広見駅) station on the Tōnō Railway. It was renamed to its present name on April 1, 1982. The station was absorbed into the JR Tōkai network upon the privatization of the Japanese National Railways (JNR) on April 1, 1987.

== Passenger statistics ==
In fiscal 2016, the station was used by an average of 1,485 passengers daily (boarding passengers only).

== Surrounding area ==
- Kani City Hall
- Kani Post Office

== See also ==
- List of railway stations in Japan
