= Taita Line =

Railway line in Gifu prefecture, Japan

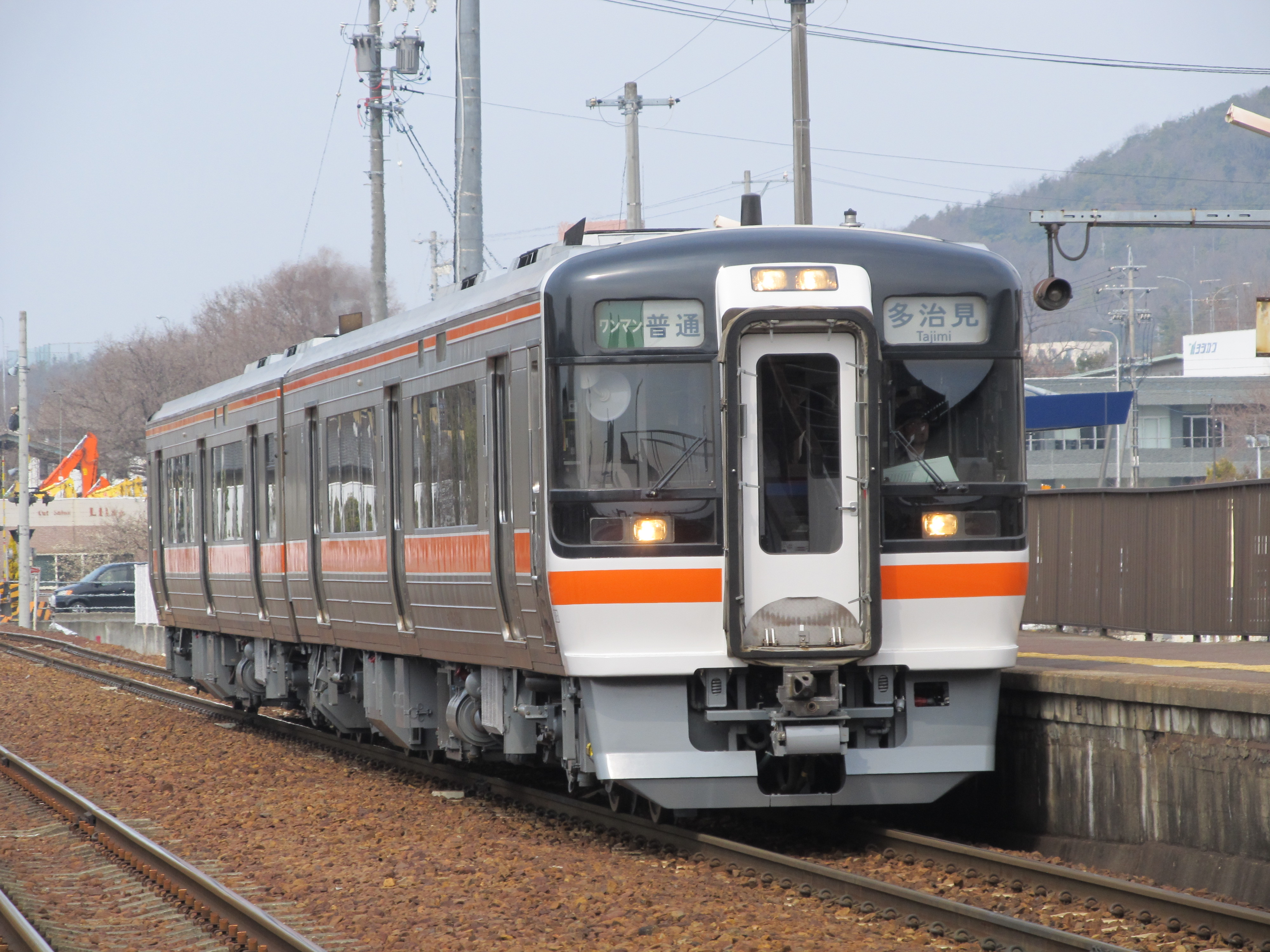
- A JR Central KiHa 75 series DMU on the Taita Line in March 2015

Overview
- Native name: 太多線
- Status: In operation
- Owner: JR Central
- Locale: Gifu Prefecture
- Termini: Tajimi; Mino-Ōta
- Stations: 8

Service
- Type: Regional rail
- Operator(s): JR Central
- Rolling stock: KiHa 75 series DMU, KiHa 25 series DMU

History
- Opened: 1926; 100 years ago

Technical
- Line length: 17.8 km (11.1 mi)
- Number of tracks: Entirely single-track
- Character: Mostly urban with a few rural areas
- Track gauge: 1,067 mm (3 ft 6 in)
- Electrification: None
- Operating speed: 85 km/h (53 mph)
- Signalling: Single track automatic closed block
- Train protection system: ATS-PT

The Taita Line (太多線, Taita-sen) is a 17.8-kilometer (11.1 mi) railway line in Gifu Prefecture, Japan, operated by Central Japan Railway Company (JR Central). It connects Tajimi Station in the city of Tajimi via Kani to Mino-Ōta Station in Minokamo. The name of the line includes a kanji from each of the terminal stations.

== Operations ==
During the day, service operates at approximately 30 minute intervals. In addition to trains running between Tajimi and Mino-Ōta Stations, there are also trains that enter the Takayama Main Line and run through to Gifu Station. During weekday morning and evening rush hours and on Saturday mornings, a train serves commuters by going to Nagoya Station.

== Stations ==
No.	Name	Japanese	Distance (km)	Transfers	Location	
CI07	Tajimi	多治見	0.0	Chūō Main Line	Tajimi	Gifu
CI06	Koizumi	小泉	3.2		Tajimi	Gifu
CI05	Nemoto	根本	4.8		Tajimi	Gifu
CI04	Hime	姫	7.9		Tajimi	Gifu
CI03	Shimogiri	下切	9.4		Kani	Gifu
CI02	Kani	可児	12.8	Meitetsu Hiromi Line (Shin Kani)	Kani	Gifu
CI01	Mino Kawai	美濃川合	15.4		Minokamo	Gifu
CI00	Mino-Ōta	美濃太田	17.8	Takayama Main Line; Nagaragawa Railway Etsumi-Nan Line	Minokamo	Gifu

== History ==
The line traces its origin to the Tōnō (Eastern Mino) line, an 11.9 km (7.4 mi), 762 mm (2 ft 6 in) gauge railway that opened in 1918. The section from Shin-Tajimi to Hiromi Station was nationalized in 1926, named the Taita Line, and regauged to 1,067 mm (3 ft 6 in), and extended to Mino-Ōta in 1928.

Passenger trains were replaced by DMUs in 1934, and steam locomotives ceased operating on the line in 1969. From 1 April 1987, with the privatization and division of the Japanese National Railways (JNR) into regional companies, the Taita Line became part of JR Central.

CTC signalling was commissioned in 1993.
