= Japan National Route 248 =

Road in Japan

National Route 248
- 国道248号
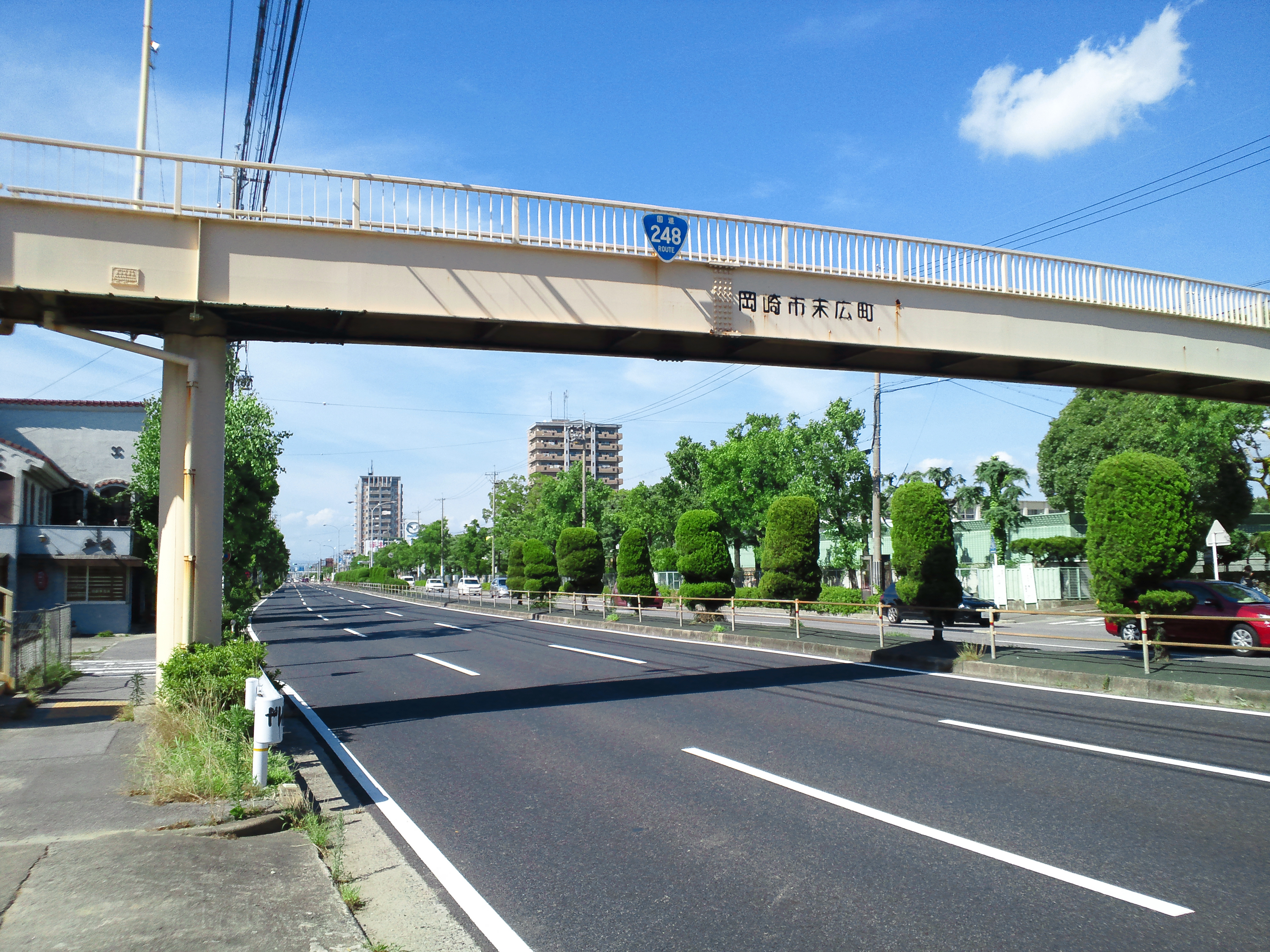
- Route 248 in Okazaki

Route information
- Length: 113.3 km (70.4 mi)
- Existed: 10 July 1956–present

Major junctions
- North end: National Route 21 in Gifu
- South end: National Route 23 in Gamagōri

Location
- Country: Japan

Highway system
- National highways of Japan; Expressways of Japan
← National Route 247	→ National Route 249

National Route 248 is a national highway of Japan connecting Gamagōri and Gifu in Japan, with a total length of 113.3 km (70.4 mi).
