= Tajimi Station =

Railway station in Tajimi, Gifu Prefecture, Japan

CF12 CI07 Tajimi Station 多治見駅
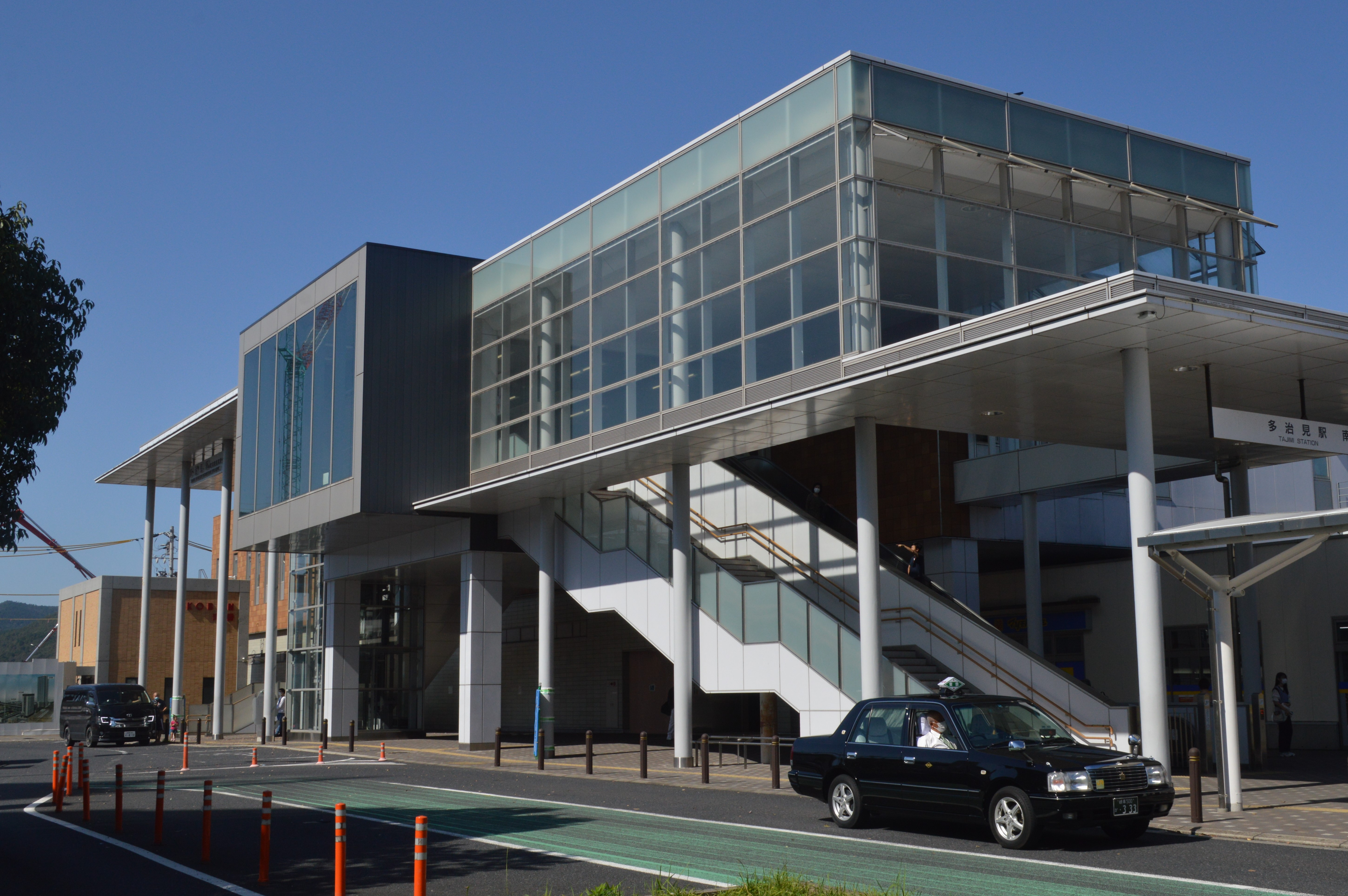
- Tajima Station, 2021

General information
- Location: Otowa-cho, Tajimi City, Gifu Prefecture 507-0037; Japan
- Coordinates: 35°20′7″N 137°7′17″E
- Operator: JR Central
- Lines: Chūō Main Line; Taita Line
- Distance: 363.3 km (225.7 mi) from Tokyo
- Platforms: 1 side + 2 island platforms
- Tracks: 5

Construction
- Structure type: At grade

Other information
- Status: Staffed (Midori no Madoguchi)
- Station code: CF12; CI07
- Website: Official website

History
- Opened: 25 July 1900; 126 years ago

Passengers
- FY2019: 13,264 daily
Location
- Location within Gifu Prefecture Location within Chubu region Location within Japan

Tajimi Station (多治見駅, Tajimi-eki) is a railway station in the city of Tajimi, Gifu Prefecture, Japan, operated by Central Japan Railway Company (JR Tōkai).

== Lines ==
Tajimi Station is served by the JR Tōkai Chūō Main Line, and is located 360.7 kilometers from the official starting point of the line at Tokyo and 36.2 kilometers from Nagoya. It is also the terminal station for the Taita Line.

== Layout ==
The station has one ground level side platform and two ground-level island platforms, with an elevated station building located above the tracks and platforms. The station has a Midori no Madoguchi staffed ticket office.

=== Platforms ===
1	■ Chūō Main Line	For Nagoya
2	■ Chūō Main Line	For Nagoya
3	■ Chūō Main Line	For Nakatsugawa and Nagano
4	■ Chūō Main Line	For Nagoya; For Nakatsugawa and Nagano
5	■ Taita Line	For Mino-Ōta

At times there are deviations from the description above.

== Adjacent stations ==
«	Service	»
JR Central
Chūō Main Line
Ena or Nakatsugawa	Limited Express Shinano	Chikusa
Tokishi	Home Liner	Kōzōji
Tokishi	Central Liner	Kōzōji
Tokishi	Rapid	Kōzōji
Tokishi	Local	Kokokei
Taita Line
Terminus	Local	Koizumi

== History ==
Tajimi Station was opened on 25 July 1900. On 1 April 1987, it became part of JR Tōkai. A new station building was completed in November 2009.

== Passenger statistics ==
In fiscal 2015, the station was used by an average of 13,688 passengers daily (boarding passengers only).

== Surrounding area ==
- Shōnai River

== See also ==
- List of railway stations in Japan
