= Agigawa Dam =

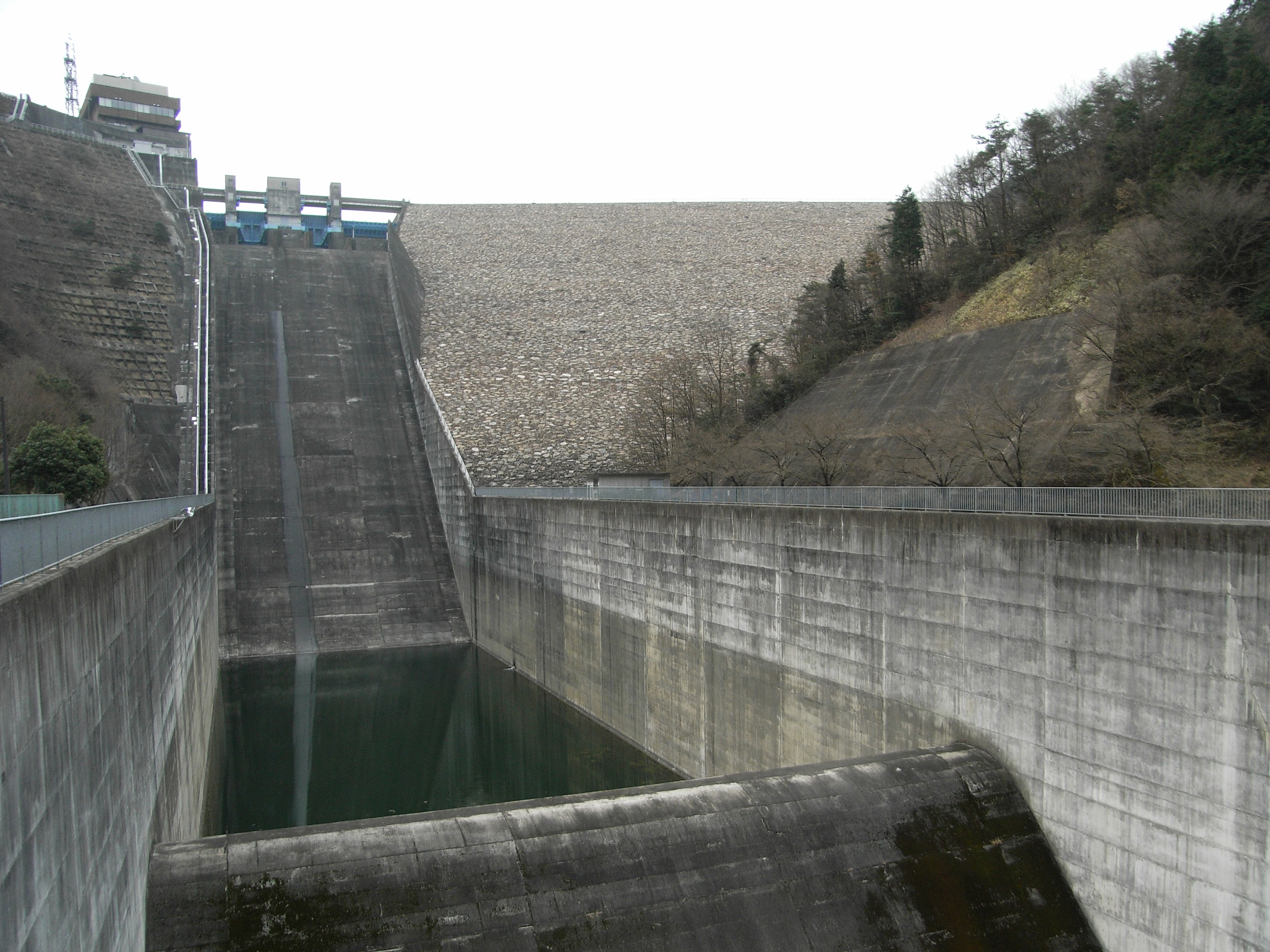
- Interactive map of Agigawa Dam
- Location: Higashino-Yamamoto section, Ena City, Gifu Prefecture, Japan
- Coordinates: 35°25′29″N 137°25′48″E
- Construction began: 1969
- Opening date: 1990

Dam and spillways
- Type of dam: Central rock-filled impermeable embankment dam
- Impounds: Agigawa River, Kisogawa River water system
- Height: 101.5 m
- Length: 362 m
- Dam volume: 4,900,000 m^{3}

Reservoir
- Creates: Agigawako Lake
- Total capacity: 48,000,000 m^{3} total, 44,000,000 m^{3} active
- Catchment area: 81.8 km^{2}
- Surface area: 158.0 ha

Power Station
- Operator: Japan Water Agency
- Installed capacity: Agigawa River Generation Plant: 2,600 kW
- Purposes: Flood control, unspecified water use, tap water, industrial water

Agigawa Dam (阿木川ダム, Agigawa damu) is a dam built on the Kiso River system, located in the Higashino section of Ena City, in Gifu Prefecture, Japan.

== History ==
The Agi River connects with the Kiso River just below Ōi Dam, running through a basin with a fairly large 2,000 mm of annual rainfall, and has long been used by Gifu Prefecture's Tōnō region (which includes the cities of Ena, Gifu, Ena and Nakutsugawa) for tap water and industrial-use water. However, in times of heavy rainfall, Agigawa River would quickly overflow, flooding the surrounding area. The river flows through Ena City, making levee construction difficult; the Chūō Expressway and the Central Japan Railway Company's Chūō Main Line also cross the river, which led to increased demand for safe flood control measures.

Demand for tap water for Nagoya and the Chūkyō Metropolitan Area's postwar population boom, as well as industrial-use water for the Tōkai and Chūkyō Industrial Areas also rose. Attempts to meet water demand for Aichi Prefecture came up short, with the Makio Dam on the Ōtaki River alone proving insufficient. Water was also in short supply in Gifu Prefecture's Tōnō region, centering on Tajimi City, sometimes escalating to drought. Existing water rights and hydroelectricity-use water rights were given priority, precluding the possibility of siphoning off water from the middle of the river, and forcing the creation of multiple small reservoirs.

With these problems in mind, the Ministry of Agriculture and Forestry (now the Ministry of Agriculture, Forestry and Fisheries) unveiled its plan to construct Agigawa Dam to—among other things—secure new water rights for irrigation of Gifu Prefecture's Tōnō region. In 1967, the project was passed along to the Ministry of Construction's Regional Developmental Bureau (now the Ministry of Land, Infrastructure, Transport and Tourism Chūbu Regional Developmental Bureau, and in 1969 the construction plans for a special multi-purpose dam were drafted. The Kisogawa had already been marked for water resource development following the Water Resources Development Promotion Act in 1966, but in March 1973 the "Kisogawa River Water System Development Plan [sic]" was partially amended, and the project was inherited by the Water Resources Development Public Corporation (now the (Incorporated Administrative) Japan Water Agency).

With this, the construction of the multi-purpose Agigawa Dam continued, with the goal of leveraging both flood prevention and better water usage.

== Purpose ==
Agigawa Dam was initially slated for completion in 1985, but ran into opposition from 30 households in Ena City's Higashino area and Nakatsugawa City (including the former Iwamura village) that were to be submerged as part of the dam's creation. The dam is located near the main part of Ena City, and residents also opposed it on grounds that it would've disrupted the area's excellent transportation; negotiations stalled. In response, the dam was designated as subject to the Act on Special Measures for Up-stream Area Development, enacted in 1973. This raised the amount of funding for compensating households affected by the dam's construction, as well as funding used for developing local infrastructure related to reservoir area development, which helped move negotiations forward, culminating in the start of construction on the main dam. After 21 years, the dam was completed in 1990.

Agigawa Dam is a central rock-filled impermeable embankment-type dam, with an original height of 100.0 meters that was later extended to 102.0 meters but sank to 101.5 meters. The dam site is curved, and resembles an arch when viewed from the air.

One of its purposes is flood control across the Agigawa and Kisogawa systems' central and lower sections. Along with Maruyama Dam (on the Kisogawa) and a cluster of other multi-purpose dams on the Kisogawa river system, the standardized design flood discharge level at Mount Inuyama was lowered from 16,000 tons per second by 3,500 tons to 12,500 tons per second. Another purpose is for unspecified water utilization, which Agigawa Dam provides for by maintaining the proper flow and ecosystem of the Kisogawa, thus securing customary water usage rights for farmlands in the area.

Agigawa Dam along with Makio Dam and Misogawa Dam provide a source of water to Aichi Prefecture, including tap water for the Owari region, the Chita Peninsula, Nagoya, and Gifu Prefecture's Tōnō region, as well as tap and industrial water to cities of Tajimi, Toki, Mizunami, Ena, and Nakatsugawa.

The dam's presence is felt in times of drought, as in 1994's drought when water to the Chita Peninsula was cut off for 19 hours on one day.

== Recreation ==
The artificial lake created by Agigawa Dam is called Agigawa-ko. On the right bank of the dam there is a small museum, restaurant, park, and other facilities, providing a recreational spot for the people of Ena. Summertime fireworks and water fountains that preserve water quality on the lake can also be enjoyed. A concert was held on the lake bottom before it was filled during initial impoundment. In 2005, Agigawa Dam was named as one of the Water Resources Environment Engineering Center's "Selected 100 Dam Lakes" upon recommendation by the city of Ena, along with Ōi Dam (on the Kisogawa).

The same area features a number of other attractions such as Ena Gorge, Iwamura Castle (made famous in the tale of the "Castle Mistress"), Japan Taishō Village (a theme park), the cities of Toki and Mizunami, which are well known for the production of Mino ceramic ware and Oribe ware; Magome-juku and Tsumago-juku, two stations on the Nakasendō, a road that connected Kyōto and Edo; Meiji Mura, and Inuyama Castle. Many visitors travel to the area as a tourist destination.

To reach the dam, take the Chūō Expressway from the Ena Interchange, and after Route 19, transfer to Route 257 from the Masaie intersection, heading straight toward Iwamura until you arrive at the dam. If traveling via public transportation, take the Chūō Main Line to Ena Station, and then transfer to the Tōnō Railways bus going toward Tōnō Station, riding for about 15 to 20 minutes and getting off the bus at "Higashino Koujima".
