= Ōi Dam =

Dam in Japan

Coordinates: 35°28′53″N 137°23′46″E

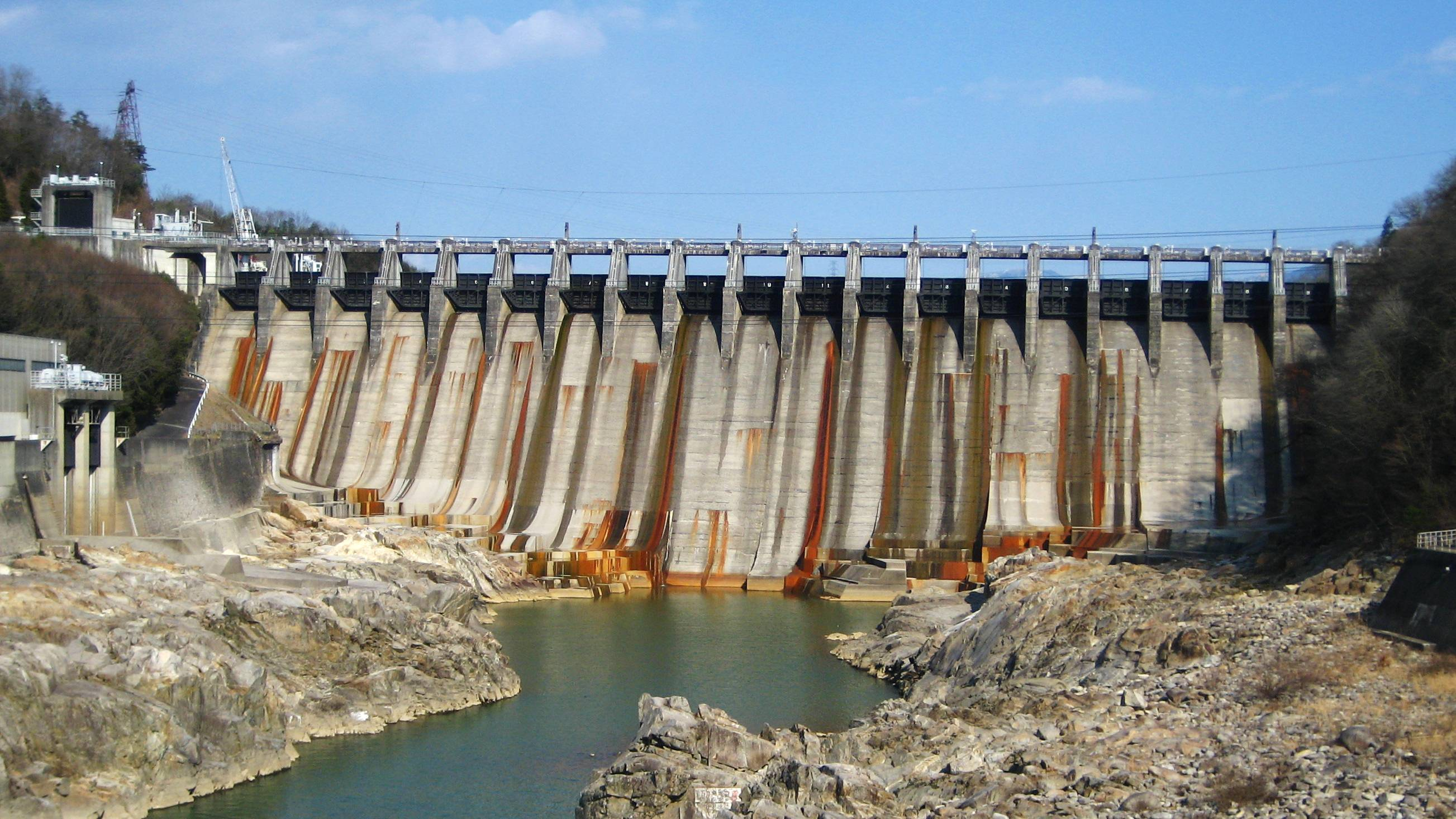
- Official name: 大井ダム
- Location: Gifu Prefecture, Japan.
- Construction began: 1922
- Opening date: 1924
- Owner(s): Kansai Electric Power Company

Dam and spillways
- Type of dam: Gravity dam
- Impounds: Agi River
- Height: 53.4 m
- Length: 275.8 m

Reservoir
- Creates: Ena Gorge
- Total capacity: 29,400,000 m^{3}
- Catchment area: 2,083.0 km^{2}
- Surface area: 141 hectares

The Ōi Dam (大井ダム, Ōi Damu) is a dam located between the cities of Ena and Nakatsugawa in Gifu Prefecture, Japan. It was built to produce electricity for the surrounding area. The Agi River flows through the dam.

Built in 1924, the Ōi Dam was the first dam built anywhere on the Kiso River system. It is also the first full-scale hydroelectric dam built in Japan. At 53.4 m (175.2 ft) tall, it is the largest gravity dam in Japan after the Taishakugawa Dam in Hiroshima Prefecture. In 1983, the New Ōi Dam (新大井ダム Shin-Ōi Damu) was built just downstream. Combined, they produce 80,000 kW of power.

== History ==
The upper portions of the Kiso River have a strong flow in terms of speed and volume, making it an ideal location for hydroelectric dams. Interest in hydroelectric dams in Japan grew greatly in 1911 when a hydroelectric law was passed. Given the technologies of the time, though, building a dam along the Kiso River was too difficult because floods often occurred.

The introduction of hydroelectric power at Ōi Dam is considered the greatest lifetime achievement of businessman Momosuke Fukuzawa.

== Surrounding area ==
The reservoir created by the dam was named Ena Gorge. More than 10 km (6 mi), the gorge is lined by rocky walls on both sides. Along with the lake created by the Maruyama Dam downstream, the area has been designated the Hida-Kisogawa Quasi-National Park.

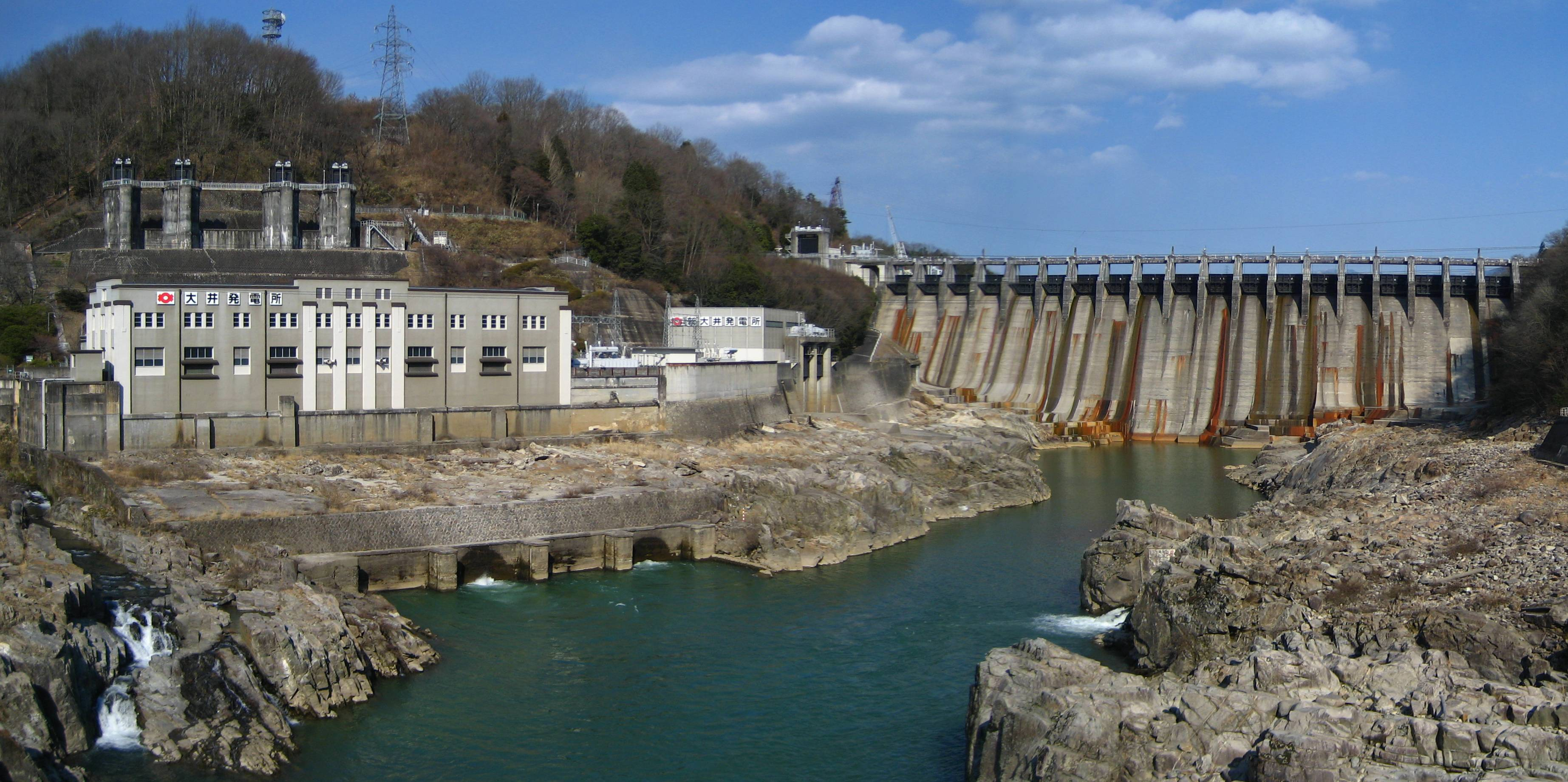
Ōi Dam
