= Aichi Kōgen Quasi-National Park =

Quasi-national park in Aichi prefecture, Japan

Aichi-Kōgen Quasi-National Park
- 愛知高原国定公園; Aichi-Kōgen Kokutei Kōen
- IUCN category V (protected landscape/seascape)
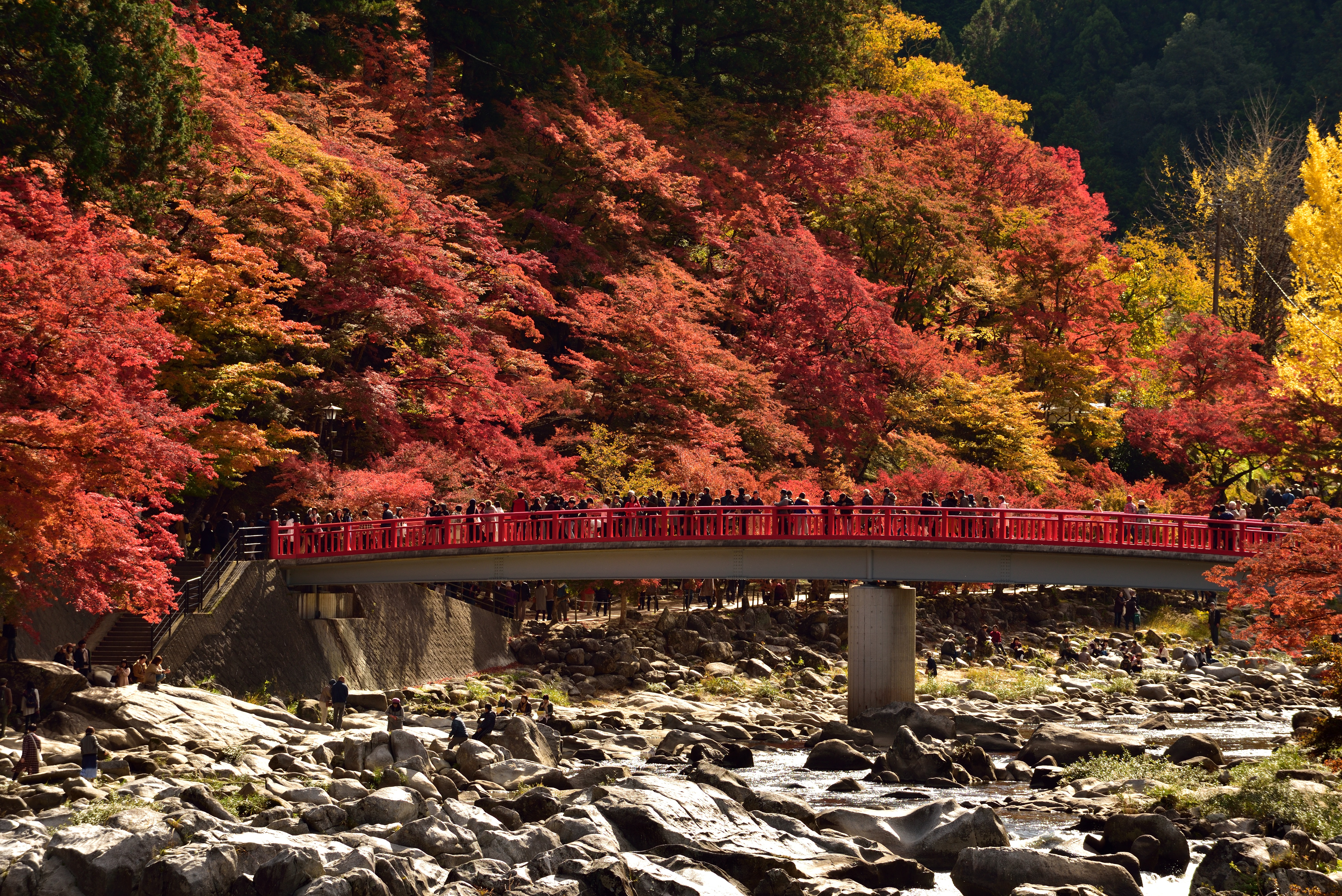
- Kōrankei, Mt.Iimori, Tomoe river, and Taigetsukyo bridge.

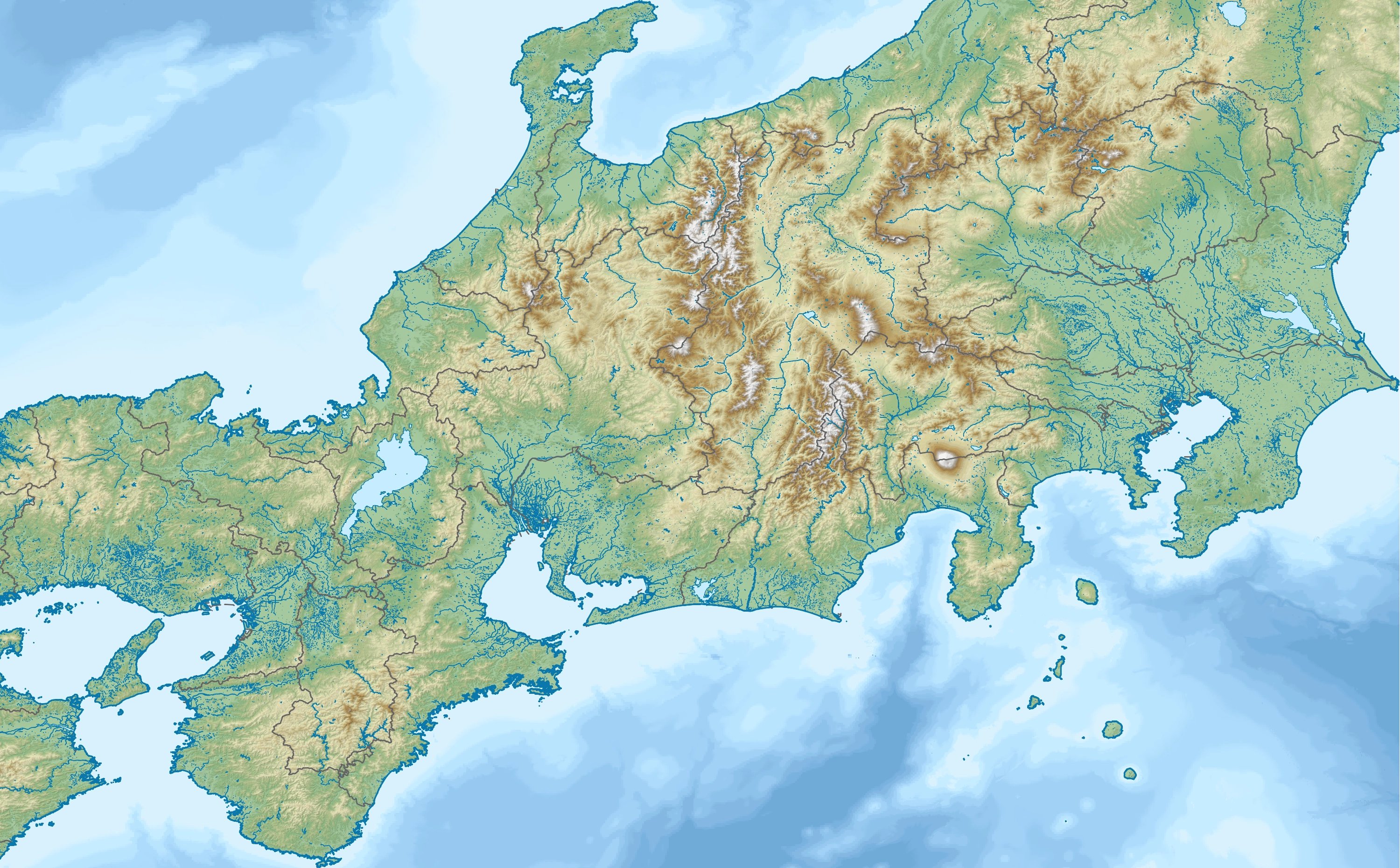
- Location within Central Japan Location within Japan
- Location: Honshū, Japan
- Coordinates: 35.034°N 137.41°E
- Area: 217.05 km^{2} (83.80 sq mi)
- Established: December 28, 1970
- Governing body: Aichi prefectural government

Aichi-Kōgen Quasi-National Park (愛知高原国定公園, Aichi-Kōgen Kokutei Kōen) is a 21,705-hectare (53,630-acre) quasi-national park in the Tōkai region of Honshū in Japan. It is rated a protected landscape (category III) according to the IUCN. As with neighboring Hida-Kisogawa Quasi-National Park and Tenryū-Okumikawa Quasi-National Park the park includes mountainous landscapes with gorges and dense forests. The part is on the border between Shizuoka and Aichi Prefecture, but is entirely within Aichi. It also includes a portion of the Tōkai Nature Trail. It encompasses the area around Yahagi Dam and the Kourankei scenic areas. The area was designated a quasi-national park on December 28, 1970.

Like all Quasi-National Parks in Japan, the park is managed by the local prefectural governments.

== See also ==
- List of national parks of Japan
