= Agi River =

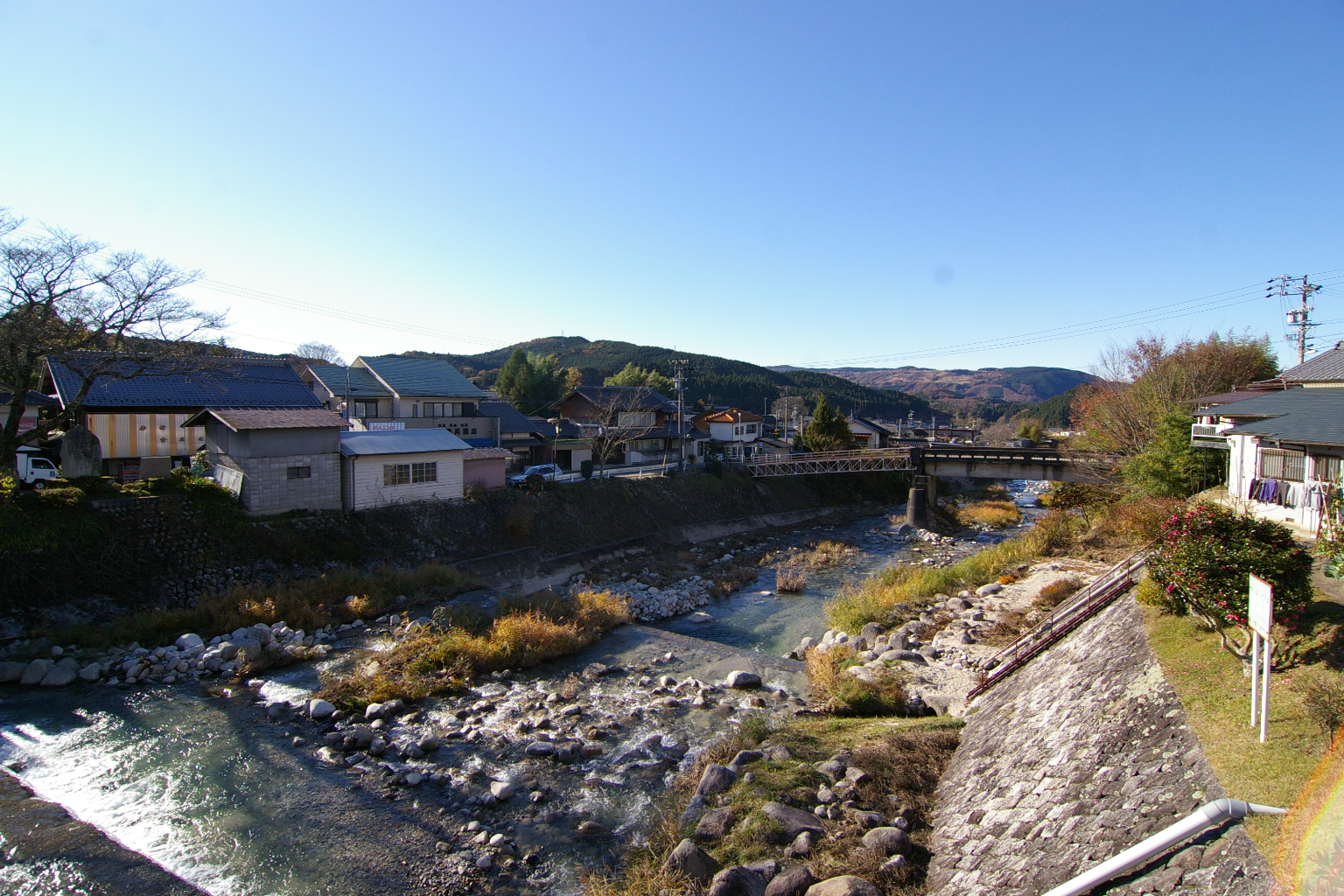
- The Agi River in Nakatsugawa

- Native name: 阿木川 (Japanese)

Location
- Country: Japan

Physical characteristics
- Source
  - location: Mount Yaki
  - elevation: 1,709 m (5,607 ft)
- Mouth: Kiso River
  - coordinates: 35°28′52″N 137°23′34″E
- Length: 16.9 km (10.5 mi)

Basin features
- River system: Kiso River

The Agi River (阿木川, Agi-gawa) is a river in Japan which flows through Gifu Prefecture. It is part of the Kiso River system.

== Geography ==
The river originates from Mount Yaki on the border of Nakatsugawa and Ena and flows west. It flows through the Akigawa Dam and the Ōi Dam before emptying into the Kiso River.

== History ==
Ōi-juku, a post town on the historical Nakasendō, was on the banks of the Agi River.

== River communities ==
The Agi river flows through the cities of Ena and Nakatsugawa in Gifu Prefecture.
