= Kōrankei =

Gorge in Japan

Kōrankei Gorge
- IUCN category III (natural monument or feature)
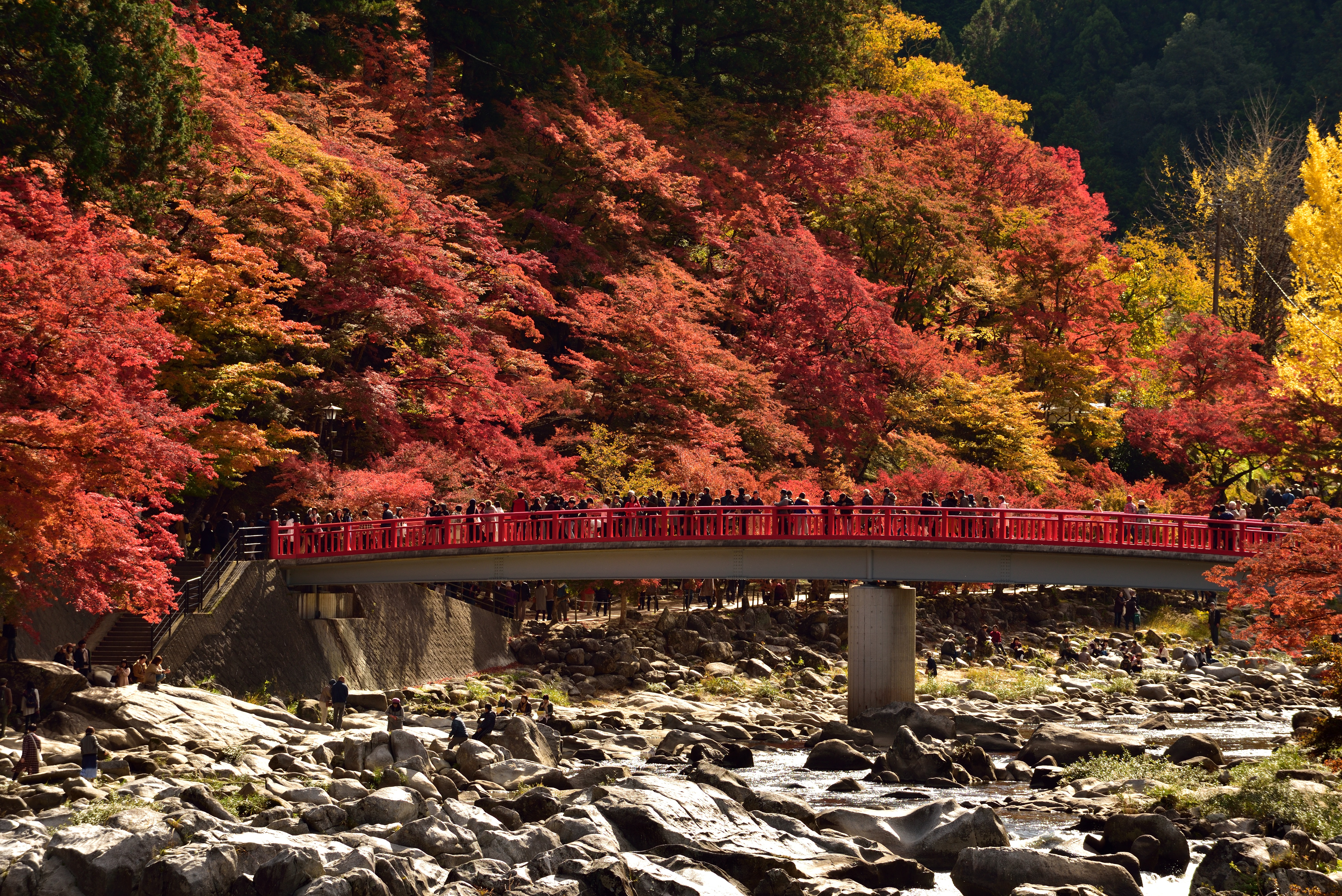
- Kōrankei Valley, 2019

- Location within Aichi Prefecture Location within Japan
- Location: Toyota, Aichi, Japan
- Coordinates: 35°07′54.63″N 137°18′48.13″E

Kōrankei (Japanese: 香嵐渓) is a gorge created by the Yodo River, a tributary of the Yahagi River. It is a part of Asuke Town, Toyota City, Aichi Prefecture. Kōrankei has over 4000 maple trees said to have been planted in 1634. It sits next to Aichi Kōgen Quasi-National Park, and is a popular tourist destination, famous for its autumn foliage and its Erythronium japonicum flowers.

== Background ==
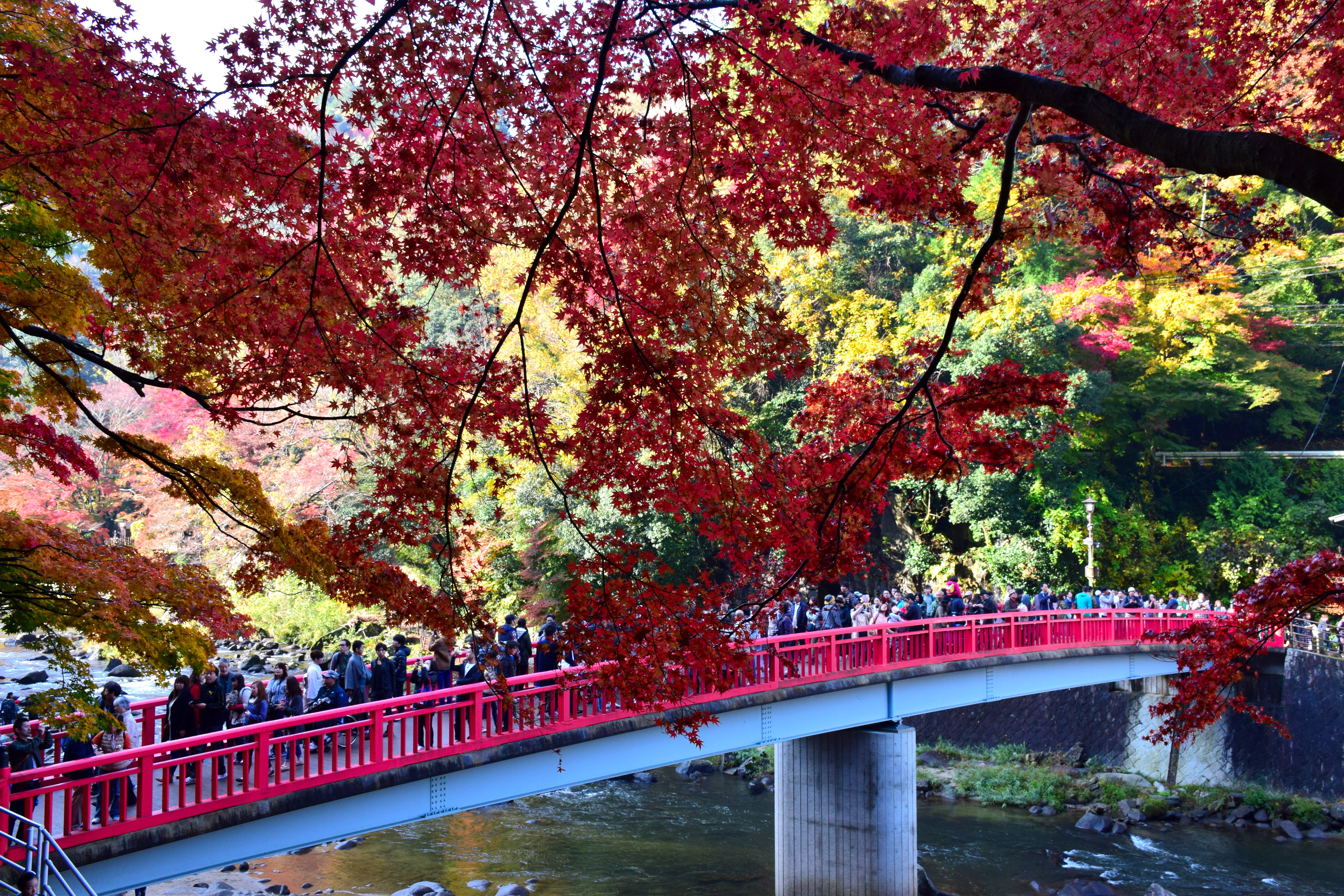
Taigetsu Bridge

In 1634, Kazuhisa Sanei, the 11th head priest of Kōjakuji Temple, is said to have planted maple and cedar trees in Asuke, on the approach from Yodogawa to Kasuji. Many maples have, since then, been planted by residents. It is said that 11 different types of maple trees have been planted at Korankei. A walking path has been built around the North side of the river valley. The Taigetsukyo bridge (Japanese: 待月橋) was named the symbol of the river in 1953. After three changes, the bridge was finally settled on as a symbol in 2007.

In 1930, when the priest and hamlet mayor were asked by Osaka Mainichi Shimbun about the naming, the answer given was "From Iimori-yama hill comes a balmy breeze, going over the Tomoegawa, and through Seifu on the approach to Kozaku-ji. It brings a fragrant climax, called 'Korankei'."

The maple trees of Kōrankei change colors in autumn, and are normally in full bloom from mid-November to late-November. The Momiji Festival is held every November, with multiple ceremonies and parades. Shaping the river valley is the 254-meter tall Iimori-yama Mountain, with a 15-minute climb to the top. At the top is an observatory dedicated to Operation Raleigh (Japan phase) venturers in their visit to the town on May 15, 1987.

== Transportation ==
Heavy traffic normally occurs on National Route 153 in the center of Asuke (for about 10 kilometers, according to Tokai TV program "Style Plus"). In March 2008, the Asuke Bypass started to be partially used to remedy traffic problems that started in 2007, so that cars would be able to bypass the center of Kōrankei to get to their destinations. Kōrankei is about a 65-minute drive via Meitetsu Bus from Higashi-Okazaki Station. Visitors from Kanto and Kansai can go via Route 153 from the Tomei Expressway.

== Gallery ==
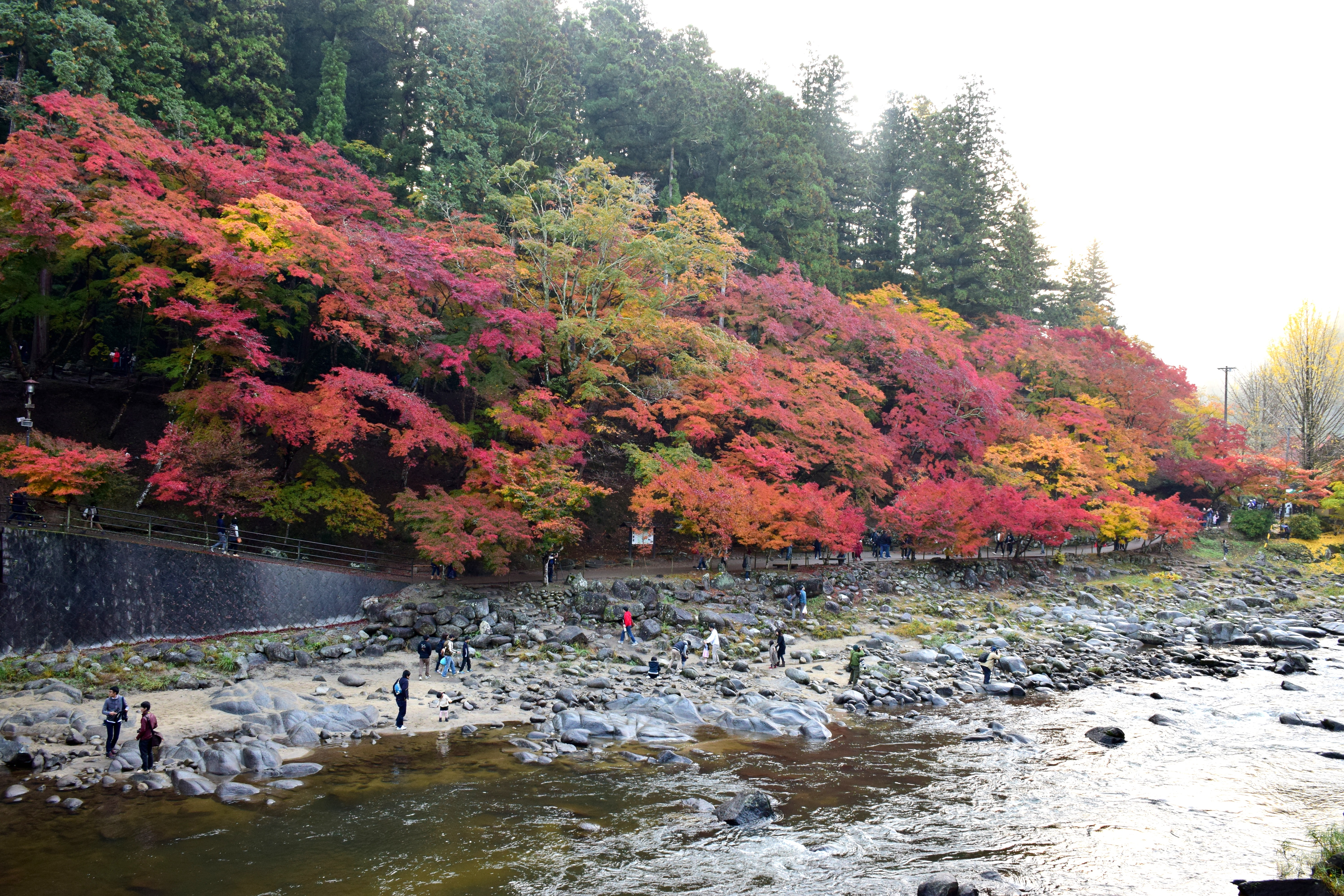
Autumn Leaves in Kōrankei Gorge

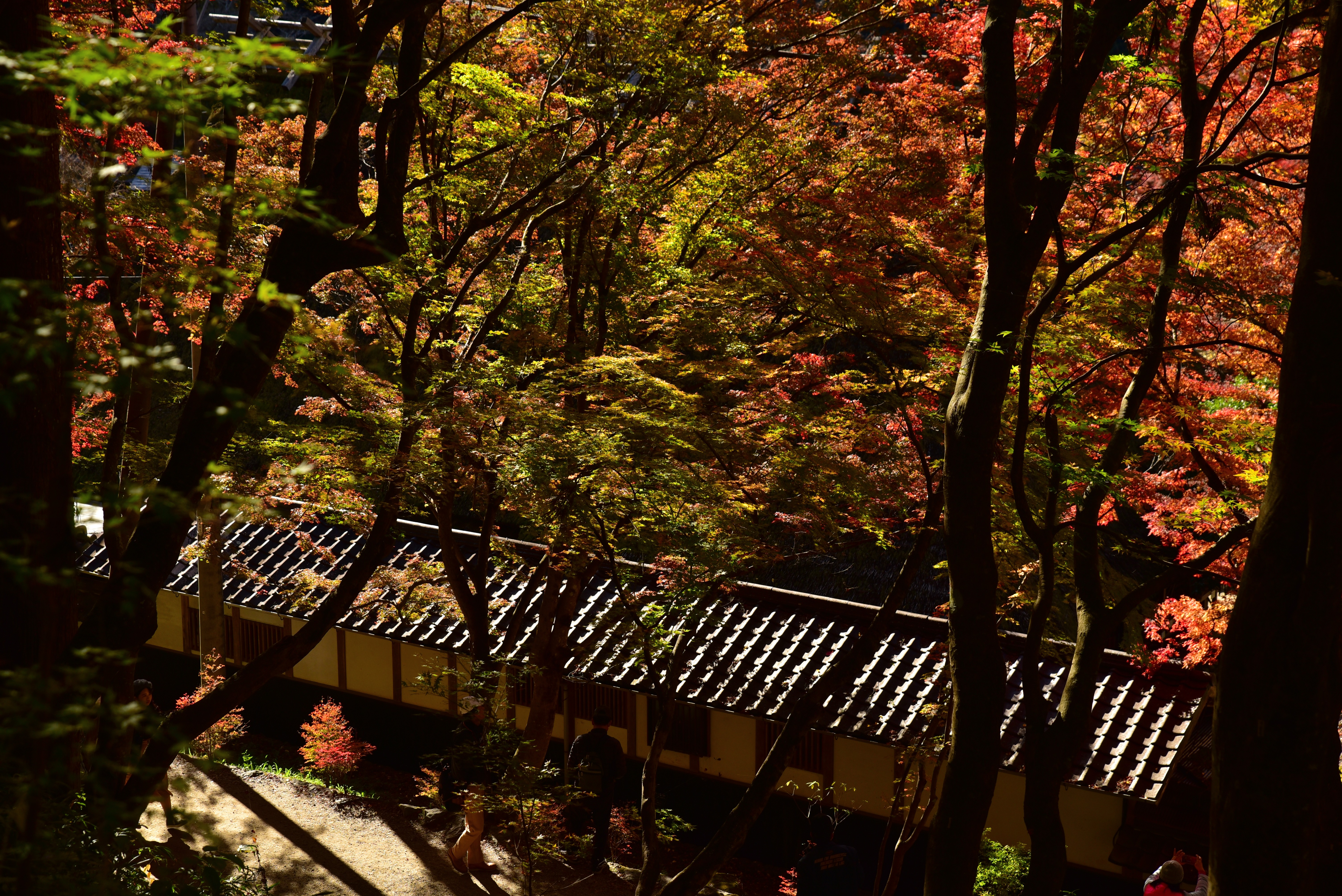
Autumn leaves of Korankei

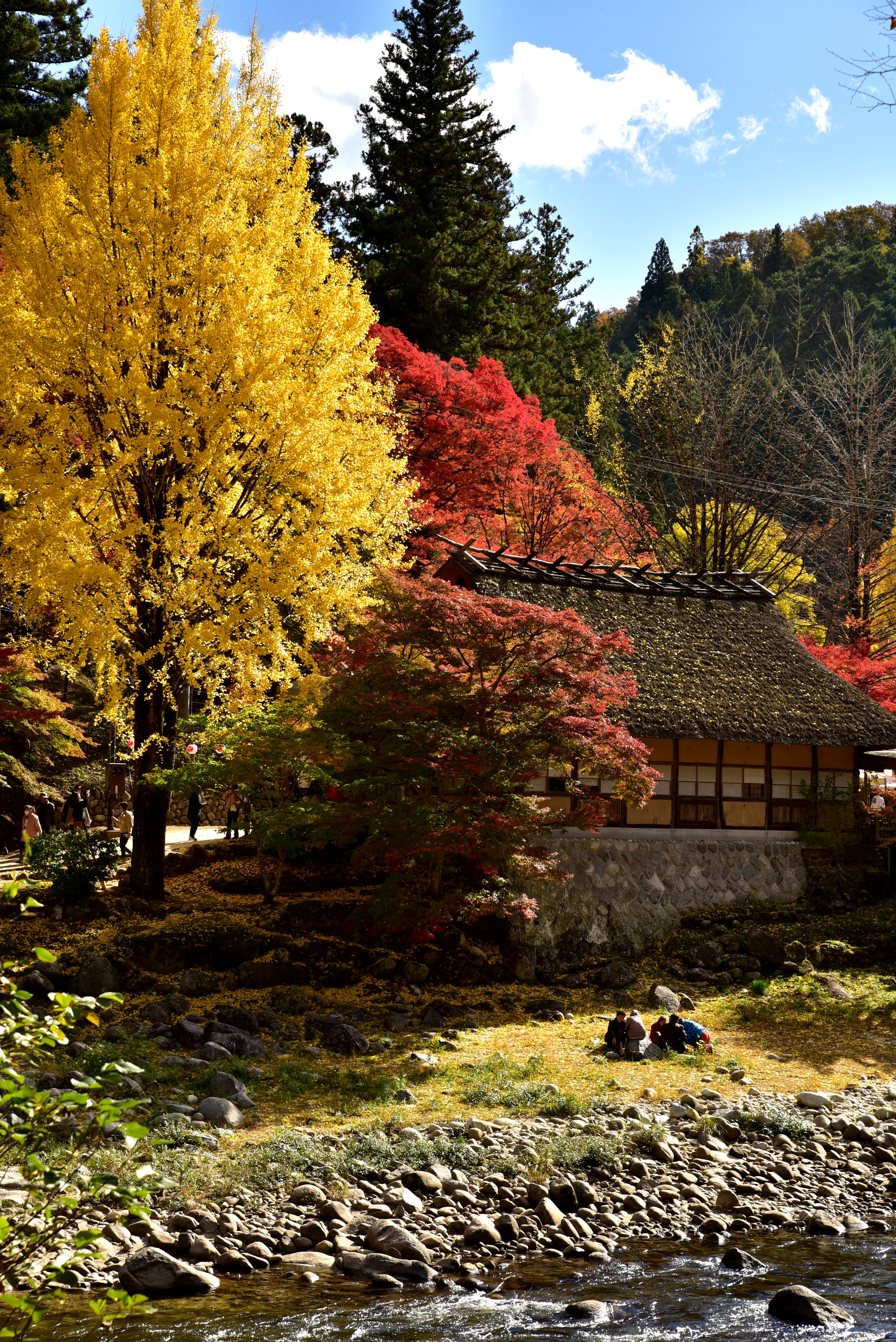
Autumn leaves of Korankei

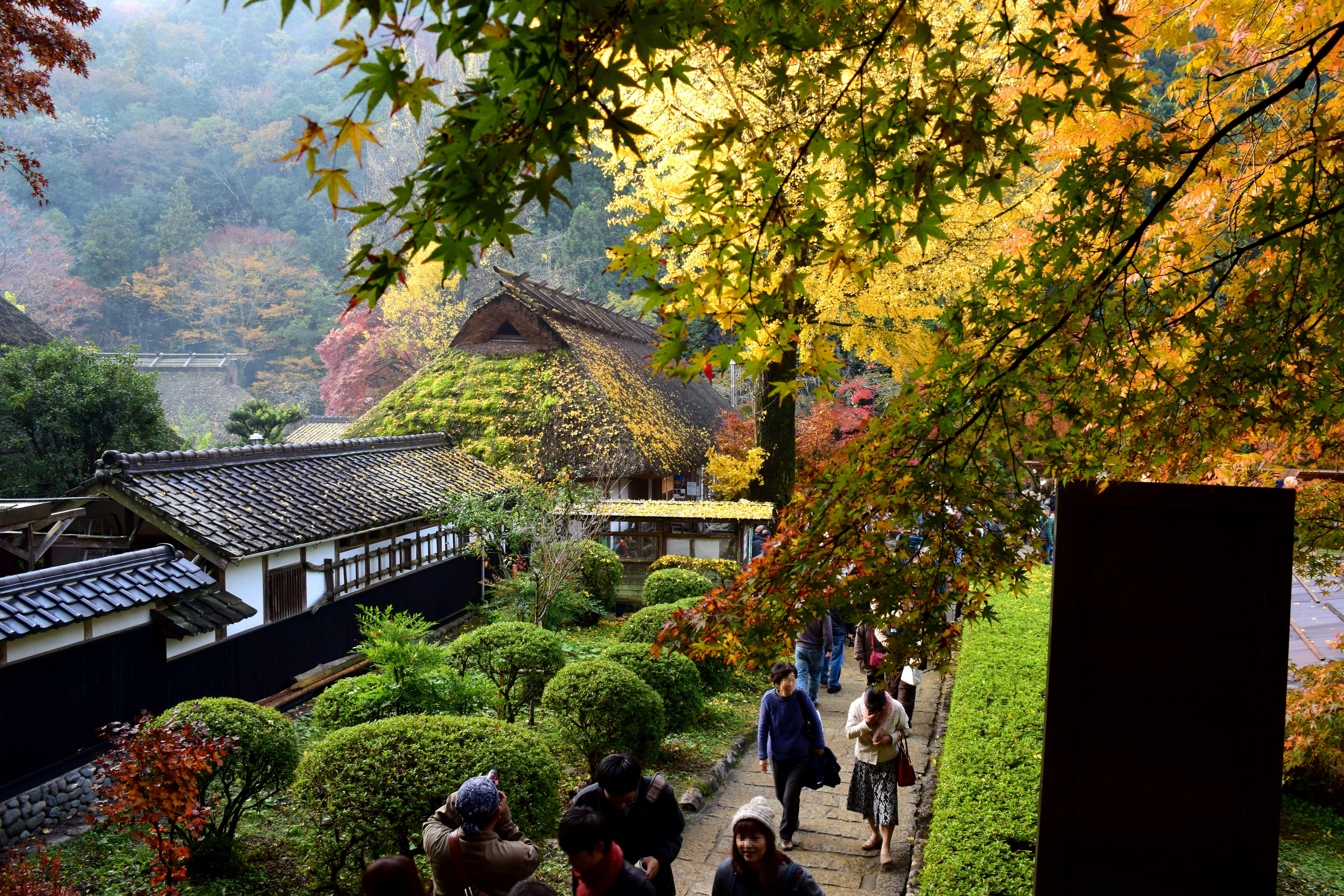
Sanshu Asuke Yashiki

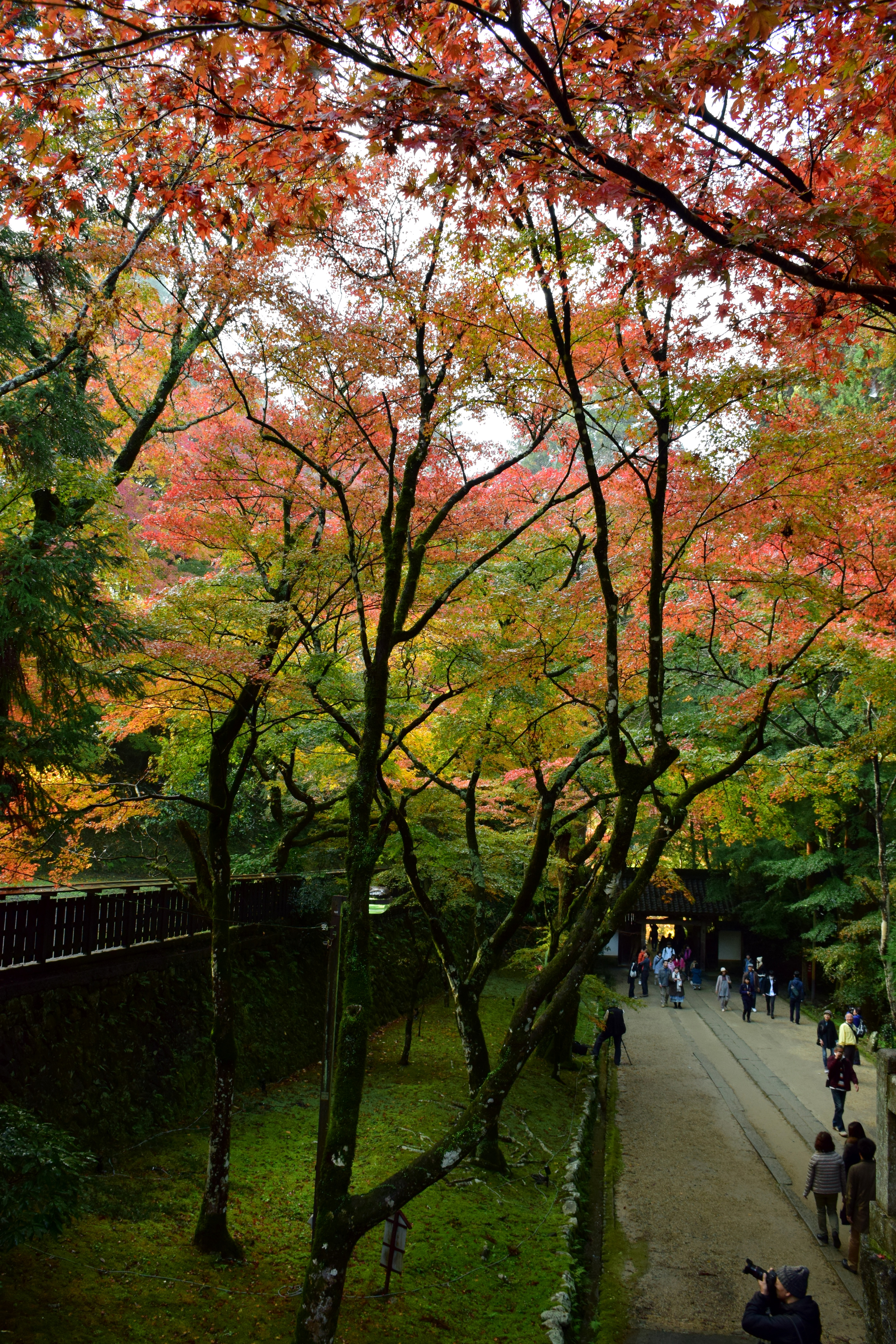
Kōjakuji Temple grounds

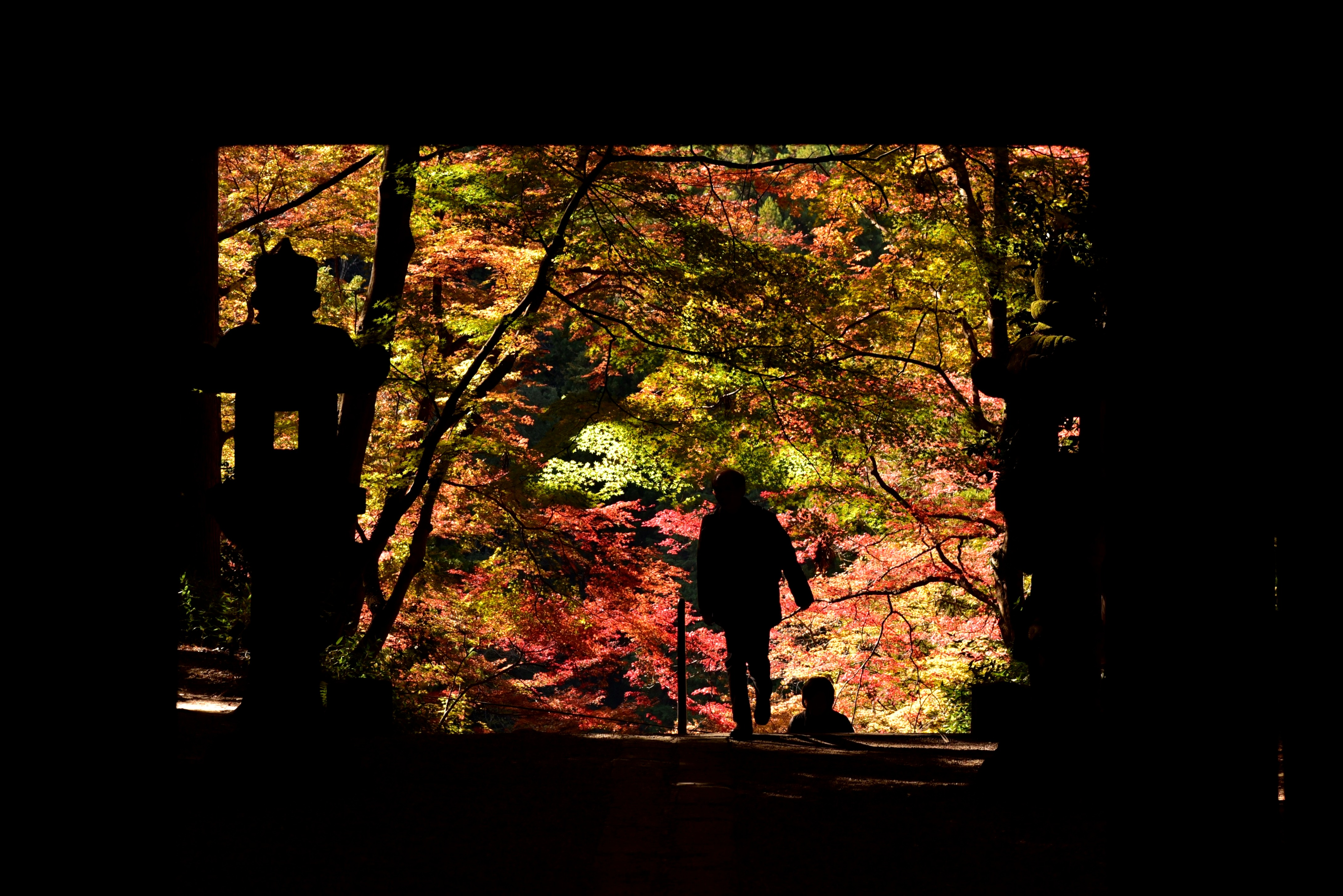
Kōjakuji Temple

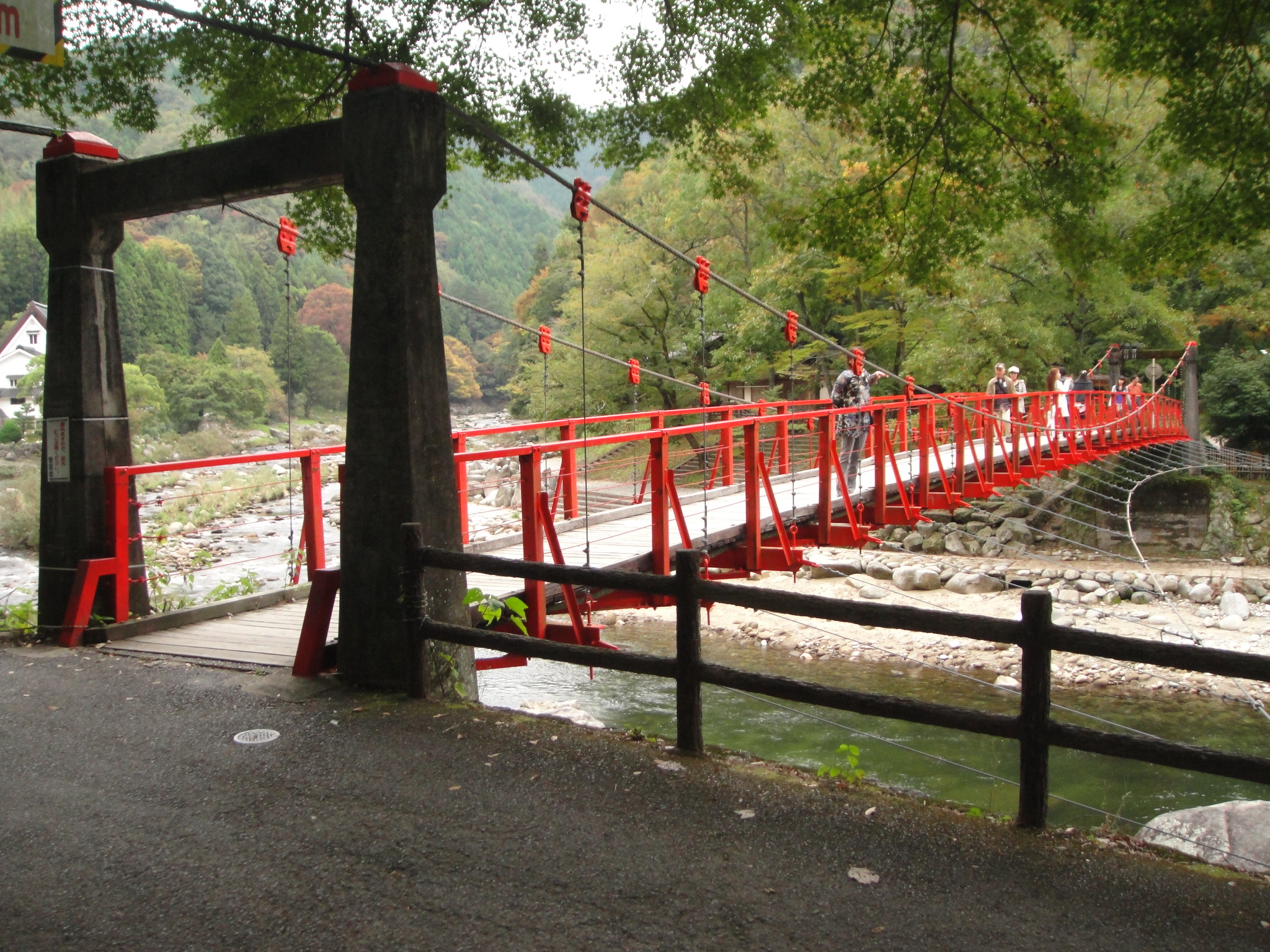
Koranashi Bridge

== See also ==
- List of canyons and gorges in Japan
