= List of canyons and gorges in Japan =

This is the list of canyons (キャンニオン) and gorges (峡/渓谷, Kyō/Keikoku) in Japan sorted by region.

== Hokkaido ==
| Name | Picture | Location | Notes |
|---|---|---|---|
| Akaiwaseigan Gorge | | Shimukappu, Kamikawa Subprefecture | It runs along Mukawa River. |
| Iwanai Sankyō | | Obihiro, Tokachi Subprefecture | Located at the foot of Hidaka Mountains. Iwanai Sankyo Maple Festival is held in every October in the city. |
| Unsekikyō | | Yakumo, Oshima Subprefecture | It runs along the Kenichi River and is located at the foot of Mt. Ohokodake. |
| Kama no Senkyō | | Hokuto, Oshima Subprefecture | |
| Kamuikotan | | Asahikawa, Kamikawa Subprefecture | It runs along the Ishikari River |
| Kinsenkyō | | Takinoue, Okhotsk Subprefecture | It runs along the Nagisa River. |
| Sakashita Senkyō | | Taiki, Tokachi Subprefecture | |
| Shikaribestu Gorge | | Shikaoi, Tokachi Subprefecture | |
| Sōunkyō | | Kamikawa | |
| Tenninkyō | | Higashikawa, Kamikawa Subprefecture | |
| Fushimisenkyō | | Memuro, Tokachi Subprefecture | |
| Futamatakyō | | Sapporo, Ishikari Subprefecture | |
| Horomankyō | | Samani, Hidaka Subprefecture | |
| Yabitsukyō | | Assabu, Hiyama Subprefecture | |
| Yūsenkyō | | Honbetsu, Tokachi Subprefecture | |
| Ryūsenkyō | | Kuriyama, Sorachi Subprefecture | |

== Tōhoku ==
=== Aomori Prefecture ===
| Name | Picture | Location | Notes |
|---|---|---|---|
| Nihon Canyon | | Fukaura | |

=== Iwate Prefecture ===
| Name | Picture | Location | Notes |
|---|---|---|---|
| Genbikei | | Ichinoseki | |
| Geibikei | | Ichinoseki | |
| Basenkyō | | Ninohe | |

=== Miyagi Prefecture ===
| Name | Picture | Location | Notes |
|---|---|---|---|
| Narukokyō | | Ōsaki | |
| Hekibyokukei | | Shiroishi | |
| Rairaikyō | | Sendai | |

=== Akita Prefecture ===
| Name | Picture | Location | Notes |
|---|---|---|---|
| Oyasukyō | | Yuzawa | |
| Komatakyō | | Kitaakita | |
| Tsuyukumasankyō | | Kitaakita | |
| Sōyakyō | | Akita | |
| Dakigaeri Gorge | | Senboku | |
| Fujisatokyō | | Fujisato | |
| Magi Gorge | | Daise | |
| Yuze Gorge | | Kazuno | |

=== Yamagata Prefecture ===
| Name | Picture | Location | Notes |
|---|---|---|---|
| Akashibakyō | | Oguni | |
| Mogamikyō | | Shōnai | |
| Momijikawa Gorge | | Yamagata | |

=== Fukushima Prefecture ===
| Name | Picture | Location | Notes |
|---|---|---|---|
| Tō-no-Hetsuri | | Shimogō | |
| Sendogarō | | Iwaki | |

== Kantō ==
=== Ibaraki Prefecture ===
| Name | Picture | Location | Notes |
|---|---|---|---|
| Jōrenji Gorge | | Kitaibaraki | |
| Hanazono Gorge | | Kitaibaraki | |
| Ryūjinkyō | | Hitachiōta | |

=== Tochigi Prefecture ===
| Name | Picture | Location | Notes |
|---|---|---|---|
| Unryū Gorge | | Nikkō | |
| Kegon Gorge | | Nikkō | |
| Kanmangafuchi Gorge | | Nikkō | |
| Setoaikyō | | Nikkō | |
| Ryūōkyō | | Nikkō | |

=== Gunma Prefecture ===
| Name | Picture | Location | Notes |
|---|---|---|---|
| Agatsuma Gorge | | Higashiagatsuma and Naganohara | |
| Sanbaseki Gorge | | Fujioka and Kamikawa, Saitama | |
| Takatsudokyō | | Midori | |

=== Saitama Prefecture ===
| Name | Picture | Location | Notes |
|---|---|---|---|
| Onōchi Gorge | | Ogano | |
| Nakatsukyō | | Chichibu | |
| Nagatoro Gorges | | Ranzan | |

=== Chiba Prefecture ===
| Name | Picture | Location | Notes |
|---|---|---|---|
| Umegasei Gorge | | Chiba | |
| Yōrō Gorge | | Ōtaki | |

=== Tokyo Prefecture ===
| Name | Picture | Location | Notes |
|---|---|---|---|
| Todoroki Gorge | | Setagaya-ku | |
| Hatonosu Gorge | | Okutama | |

=== Kanagawa Prefecture ===
| Name | Picture | Location | Notes |
|---|---|---|---|
| Jinkashita Gorge | | Yokohama | |
| Nakatsu Gorge | | Aikawa and Kiyokawa | |
| Yūshin Gorge | | Yamakita | |

== Chūbu ==
=== Niigata Prefecture ===
| Name | Picture | Location | Notes |
|---|---|---|---|
| Kiyotsu Gorge | | Tōkamachi | |

=== Toyama Prefecture ===
| Name | Picture | Location | Notes |
|---|---|---|---|
| Kurobe Gorge | | Kurobe | |
| Sengankei | | Kamiichi | |
| Jinzūkyō | | Toyama | |
| Myōgankyō | | Nanto | |
| Hitokudani | | Nanto | |
| Shōgawakyō | | Nanto and Tonami | |
| Miyajimakyō | | Oyabe | |

=== Ishikawa Prefecture ===
| Name | Picture | Location | Notes |
|---|---|---|---|
| Kakusen Gorge | | Kaga | |

=== Fukui Prefecture ===
| Name | Picture | Location | Notes |
|---|---|---|---|
| Kuzuryūkyō | | Ōno | |
| Kuroko Gorge | | Tsuruga | |

=== Yamanashi Prefecture ===
| Name | Picture | Location | Notes |
|---|---|---|---|
| Ojiragawa Gorge | | Hokuto | |
| Nishizawa and Higashizawa Gorges | | Yamanashi | |
| Hakuhō Gorge | | Minami-Alps | |
| Fukushigawa Gorge | | Nanbu | |

=== Nagano Prefecture ===
| Name | Picture | Location | Notes |
|---|---|---|---|
| Tenryū-kyō | | Iida | |
| Nazame no Toko | | Agematsu | |
| Uchiyamakyō | | Saku | |
| Sebaiwakyō | | Saku | |
| Okuzusobana Gorge | | Nagano | |
| Sosubana Gorge | | Nagano | |

=== Gifu Prefecture ===
| Name | Picture | Location | Notes |
|---|---|---|---|
| Ena Gorge | | Ena and Nakatsugawa | |
| Hisuikyō | | Hichisō | |
| Tsukechikyō | | Tsukechi | |
| Nakayamashichiri | | Gero | |
| Fujikurakyō | | Gero | |
| Yokotanikyō | | Gero | |
| Ibikyō | | Ibigawa | |
| Suzuikyō | | Yaotsu | |
| Fukazawakyō | | Yaotsu | |
| Otome Gorge | | Nakatsugawa | |
| Kaore Gorge | | Seki | |
| Tarakyō | | Ōgaki | |

=== Shizuoka Prefecture ===
| Name | Picture | Location | Notes |
|---|---|---|---|
| Sumatakyō | | Kawanehon | |
| Shirakirakyō | | Tenryū-ku, Hamamatsu | |

=== Aichi Prefecture ===
| Name | Picture | Location | Notes |
|---|---|---|---|
| Japan Rhine | | Minokamo, Gifu and Inuyama, Aichi | |
| Kōrankei | | Toyota | |
| Ganpachikyō | | Toyota | |
| Hōraikyō | | Shinshiro | |
| Kuragari Gorge | | Shinshiro | |
| Chiiwa Gorge | | Okazaki | |

== Kinki ==
=== Mie Prefecture ===
| Name | Picture | Location | Notes |
|---|---|---|---|
| Ōsugidani | | Ōdai | |
| Kaochidani (Koochidani) | | Nabari | |
| Ugakei | | Inabe | |
| Miyazumakyō | | Yokkaichi | |
| Sekisuikei | | Kameyama | |
| Dorokyō | | Mie Prefecture, Wakayama Prefecture, Nara Prefecture | |
| Uodobikei | | Kihoku | |
