= Japan Rhine =

Valley

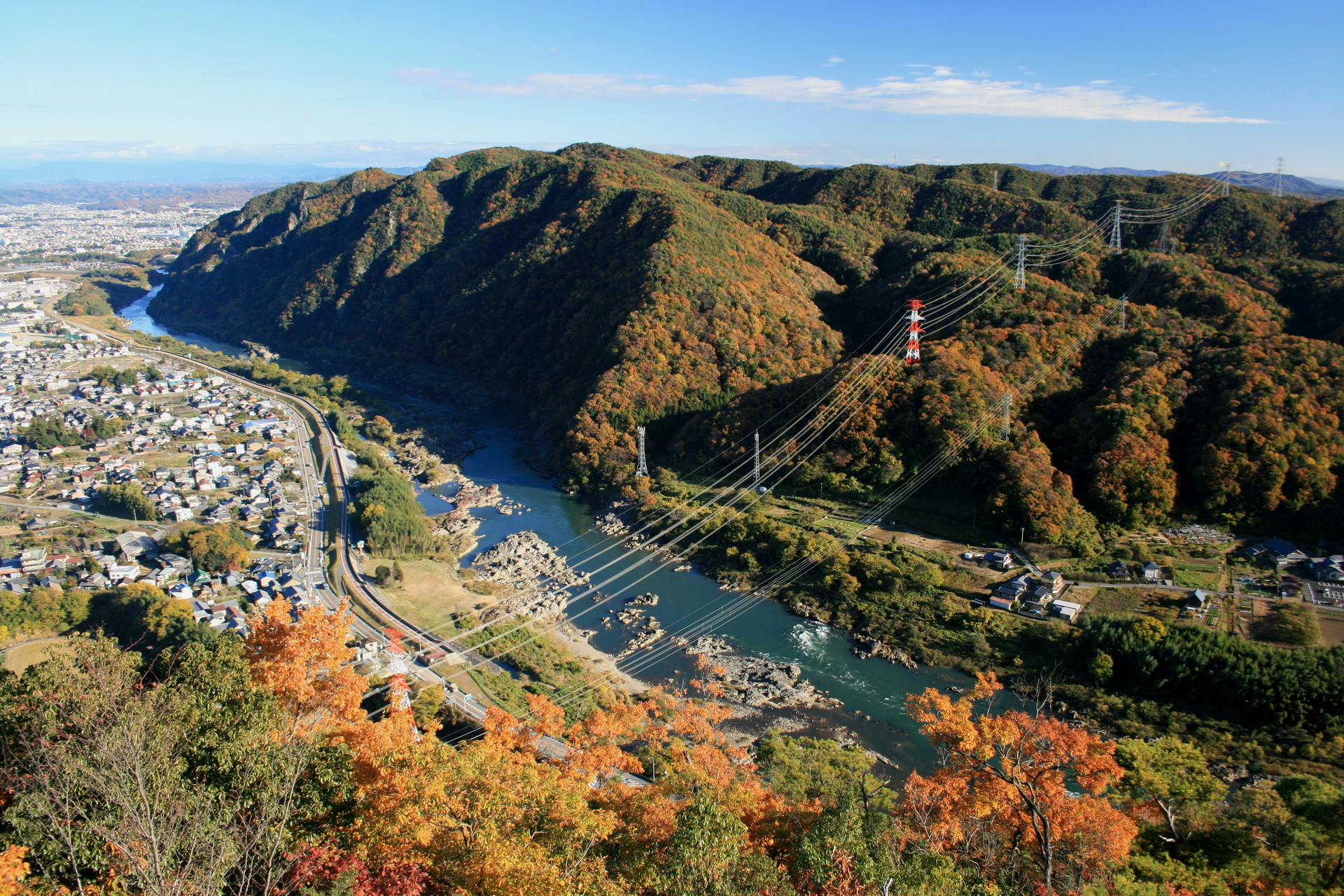
Japan Rhine seen from Sarubami Castle

The Japan Rhine (日本ライン, Nihon Rain) refers to the valley of the Kiso River between Minokamo, Gifu and Inuyama, Aichi, Japan. This nickname was given to the region in 1913 by Shiga Shigetaka (Japanese: 志賀重昂). The length of the Japan Rhine is about 13 km. Boat tours along the Japan Rhine were previously available, but the service was canceled in 2013 due to the negative business outlook resulting from an accident that occurred on August 17, 2011.

== See also ==
- Kiso River
- Rhine
- List of canyons and gorges in Japan
