= Maruyama Dam =

Dam in Gifu Prefecture, Japan

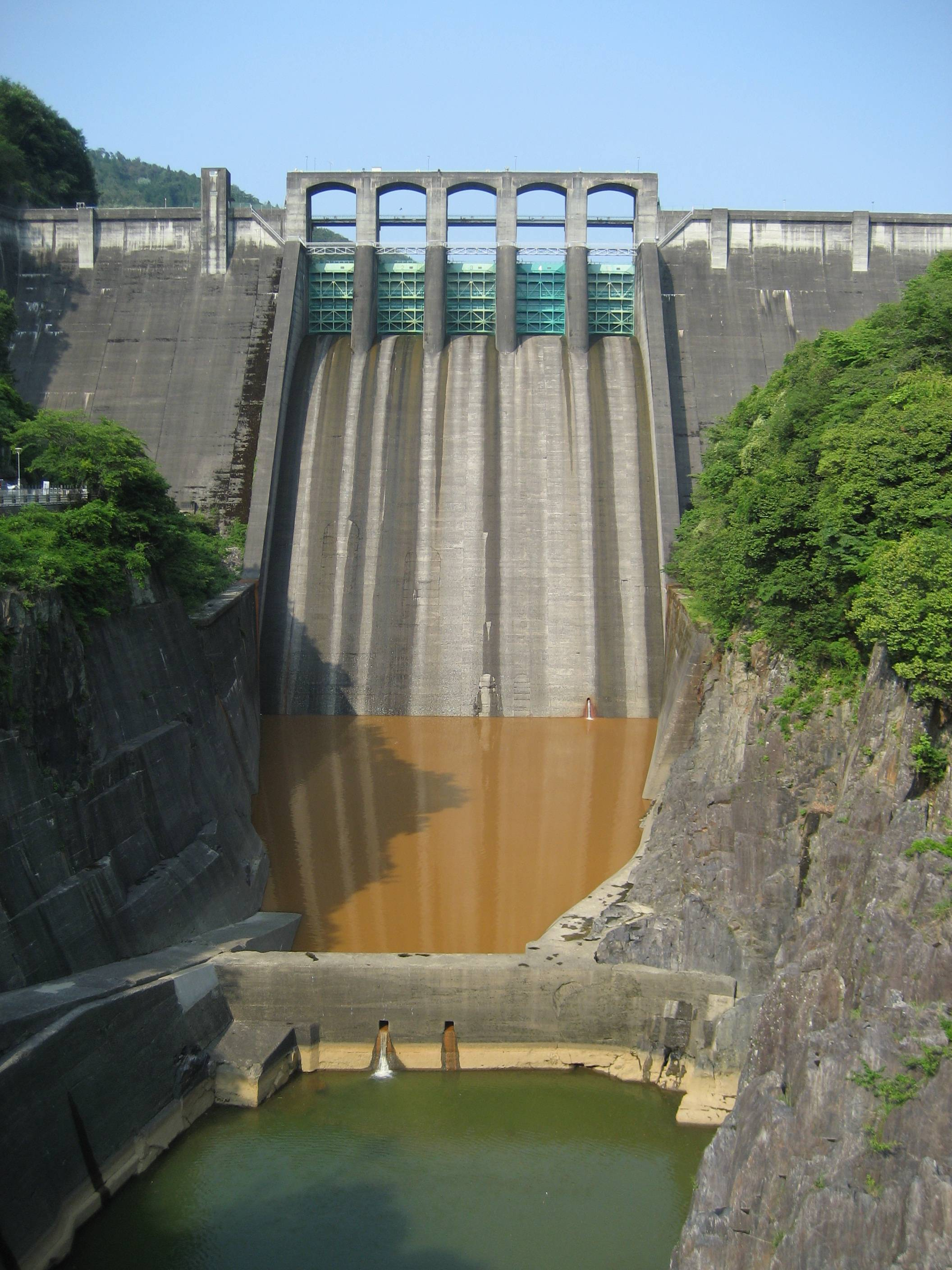
- Interactive map of Maruyama Dam
- Location: Mitake, Gifu Prefecture, Japan.
- Coordinates: 35°28′08.0″N 137°10′20.0″E
- Construction began: 1943
- Opening date: 1955
- Owners: MLIT and Kansai Electric Power Company

Dam and spillways
- Impounds: Kiso River
- Height: 98.2 m
- Length: 260 m

Reservoir
- Total capacity: 79,520,000 m^{3}
- Catchment area: 2,409.0 km^{2}
- Surface area: 263 hectares

The Maruyama Dam (丸山ダム, Maruyama Damu) is a dam on the border of Mitake and Yaotsu in Gifu Prefecture, Japan. It was built on the upper reaches of the Kiso River system. It is a gravity dam that is 98.2 m (322 ft) tall. It is the site of a power plant.

It was built after World War II as part of a large, nationwide dam building project.

== Surrounding area ==
Sosui Gorge (蘇水峡 Sosui-kyō) was formed by the completion of the dam. Along with Ena Gorge further upstream, the area is part of the Hida-Kisogawa Quasi-National Park.

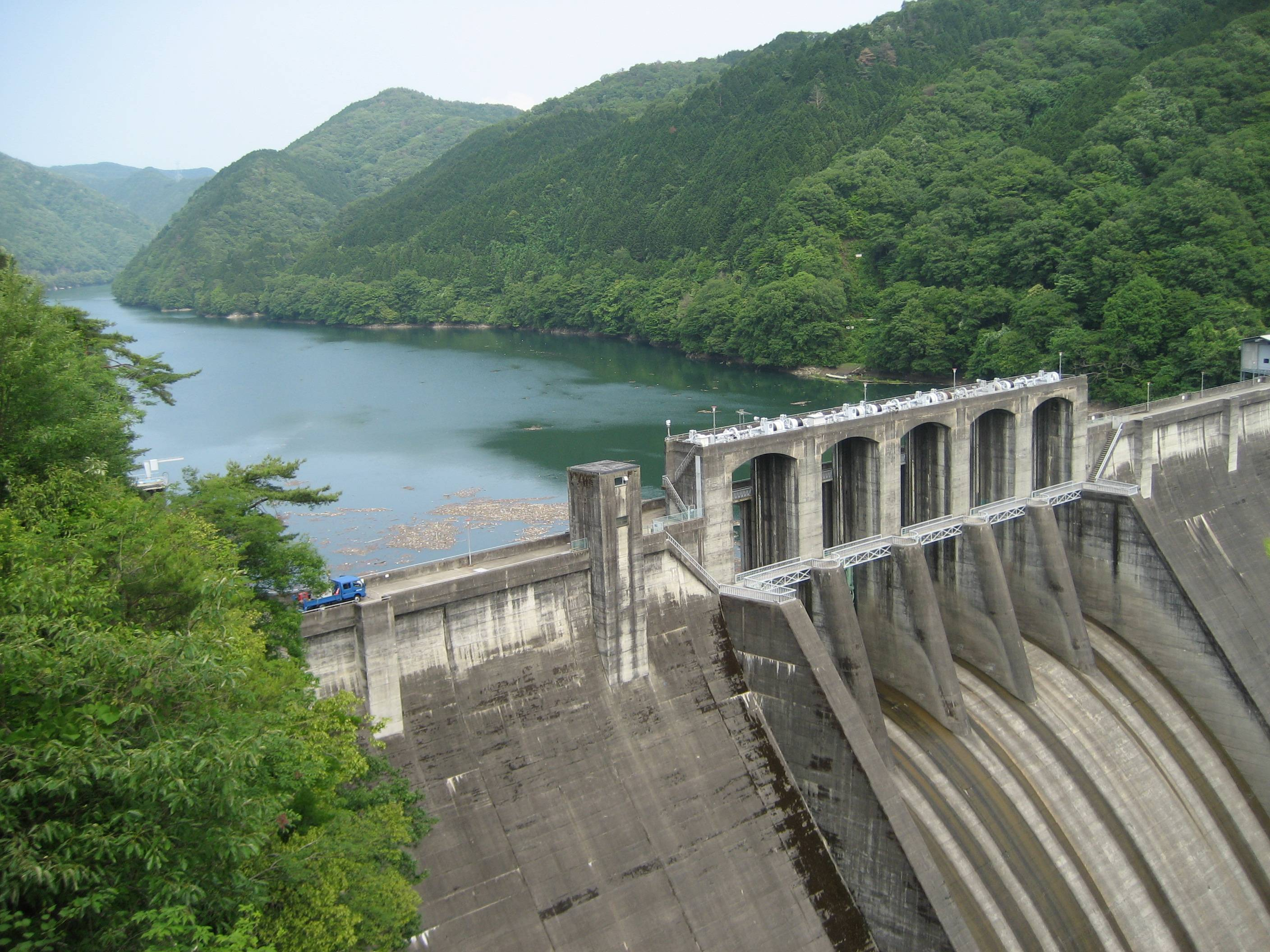
Maruyama Dam with Sosui Gorge behind it
