= Taishakugawa Dam =

Dam in Hiroshima Prefecture, Japan

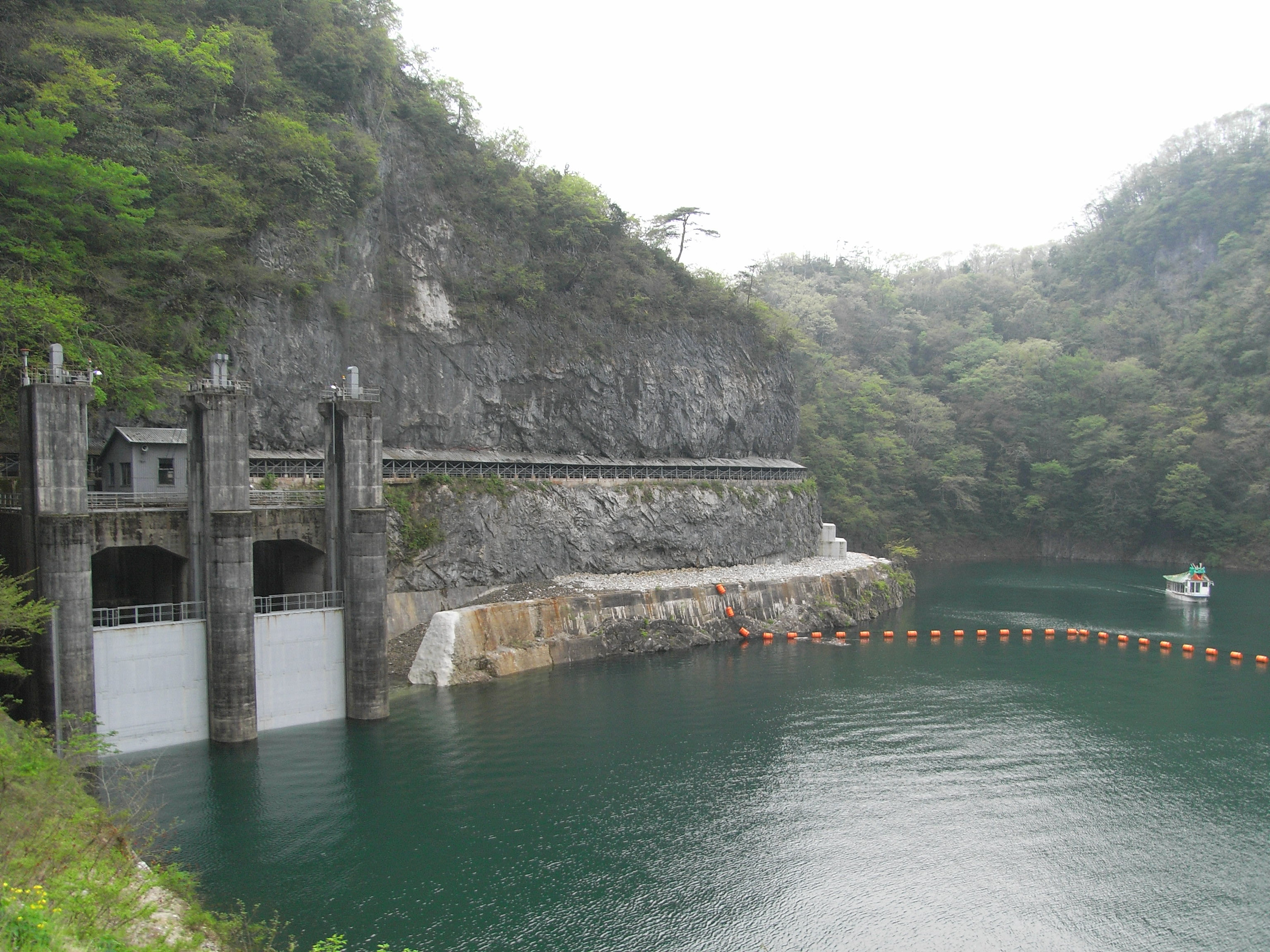
- Interactive map of Taishakugawa Dam
- Location: Shōbara, Hiroshima Prefecture, Japan.
- Coordinates: 34°49′41″N 133°14′05″E
- Construction began: 1920
- Opening date: 1924

Dam and spillways
- Height: 62.1 m
- Length: 35.2 m

Reservoir
- Creates: Lake Shuiryuko
- Total capacity: 14,287,000 m^{3}
- Catchment area: 120.0 km^{2}
- Surface area: 66 hectares

Taishakugawa Dam is a dam in Shōbara, in the Hiroshima Prefecture of Japan.

Formerly, the dam was a sightseeing location on local bus tours.
