= Ena Gorge =

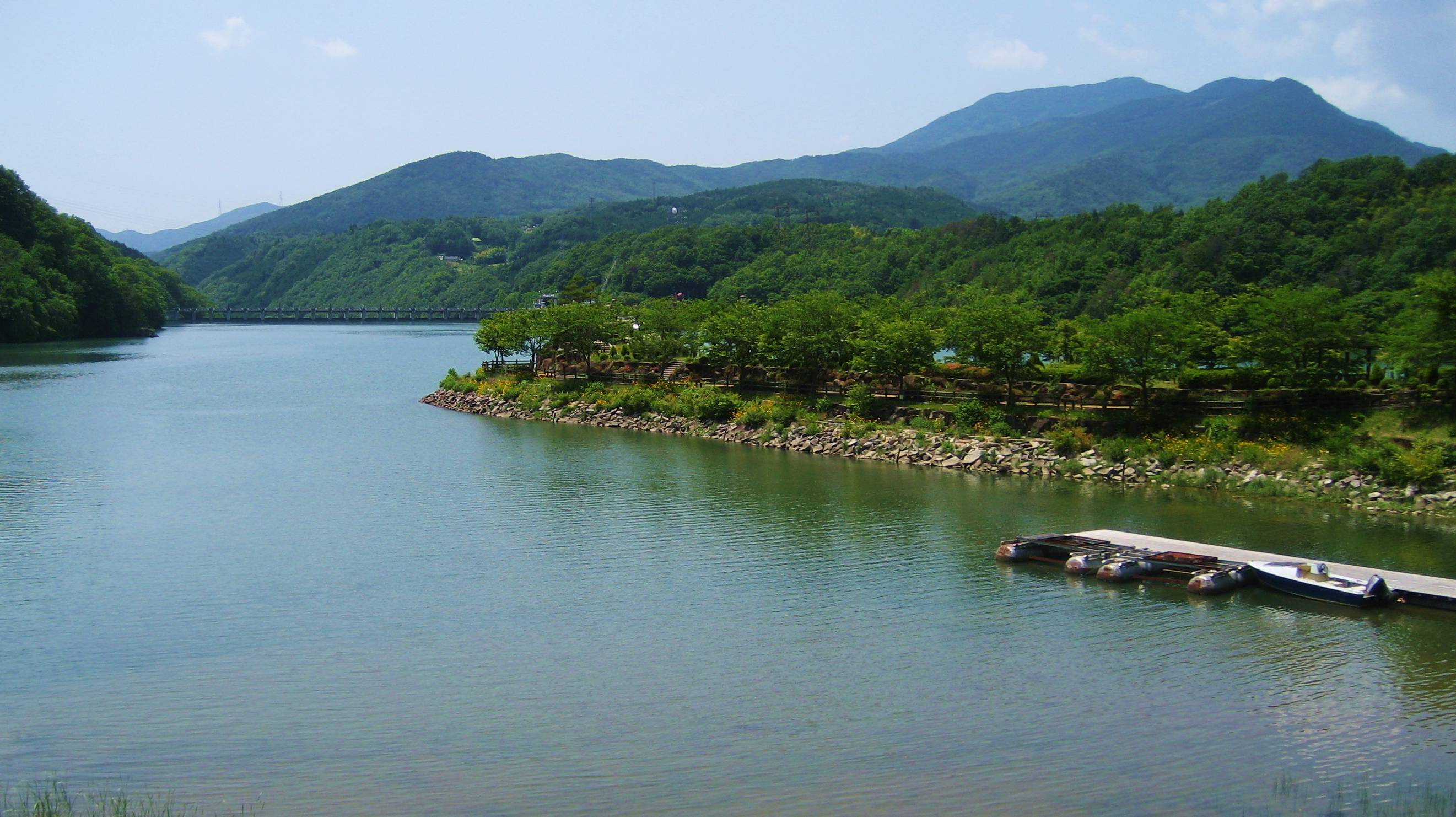
Ena Gorge and Sazanami Park

Ena Gorge (恵那峡, Ena-kyō) is a river valley located at the mid reaches of the Kiso River, which runs through the cities of Ena and Nakatsugawa in Gifu Prefecture, Japan.

Ena Gorge was so named by Shiga Shigetaka, a geographer of that time who praised the harmony of the mysteriously shaped rocks, which appeared to be continuous with the lakeside vista of Ōi Dam. It is situated in Ena Gorge Prefectural Park.

The mysteriously shaped rock formations are prominent throughout. Byobu Rock, Gunkan Rock, Shishi Rock, Kagami Rock, and more can be seen, and there are jet boats that afford passengers a closer look at the rocks.

This is also a very important place geologically. There is a Mineral Museum. The area also thrives as a vacation spot with close proximity to the Nagoya Metropolitan area.

Ena-kyo Ohashi Bridge spans Ena Gorge.

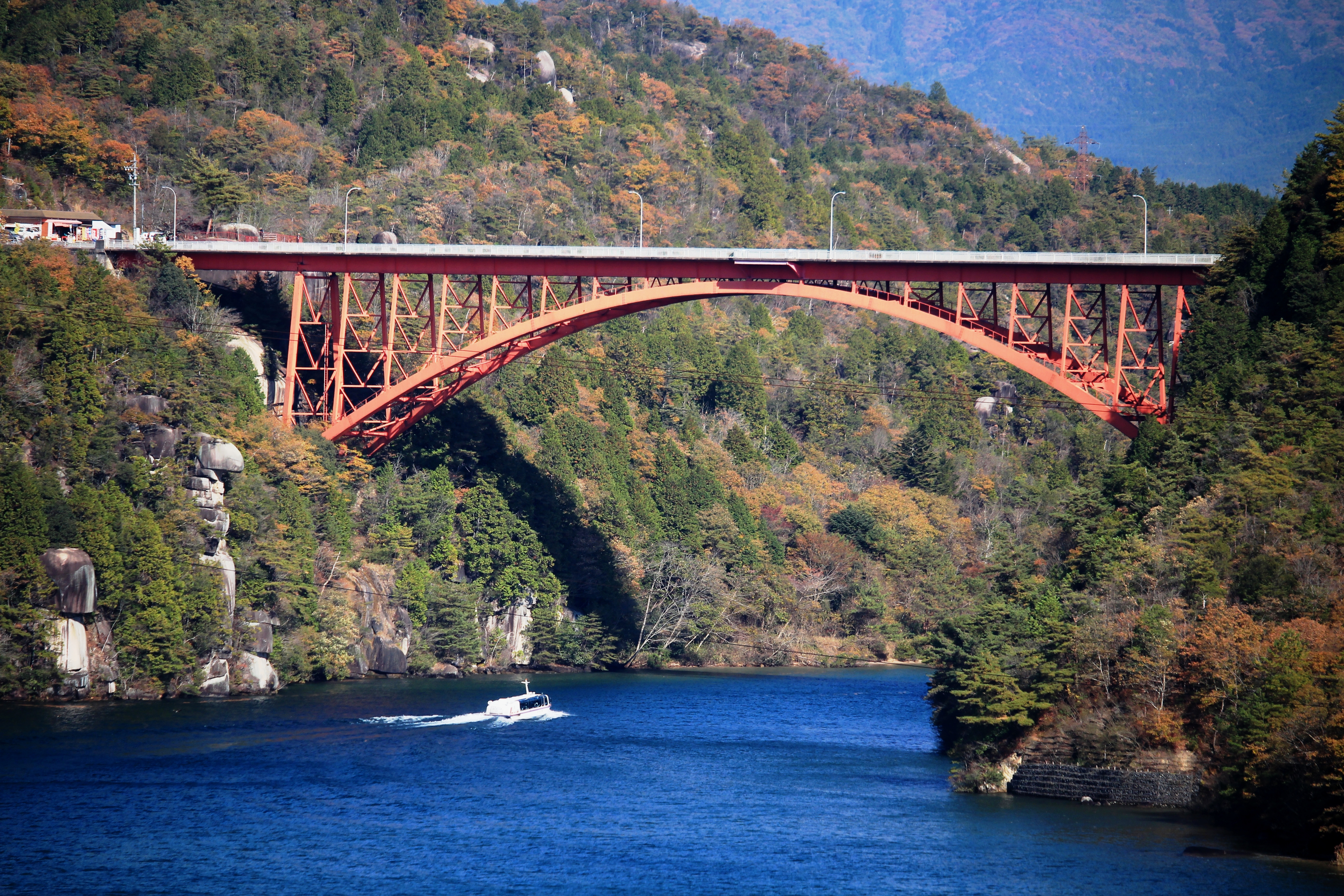
Ena-kyo Bridge

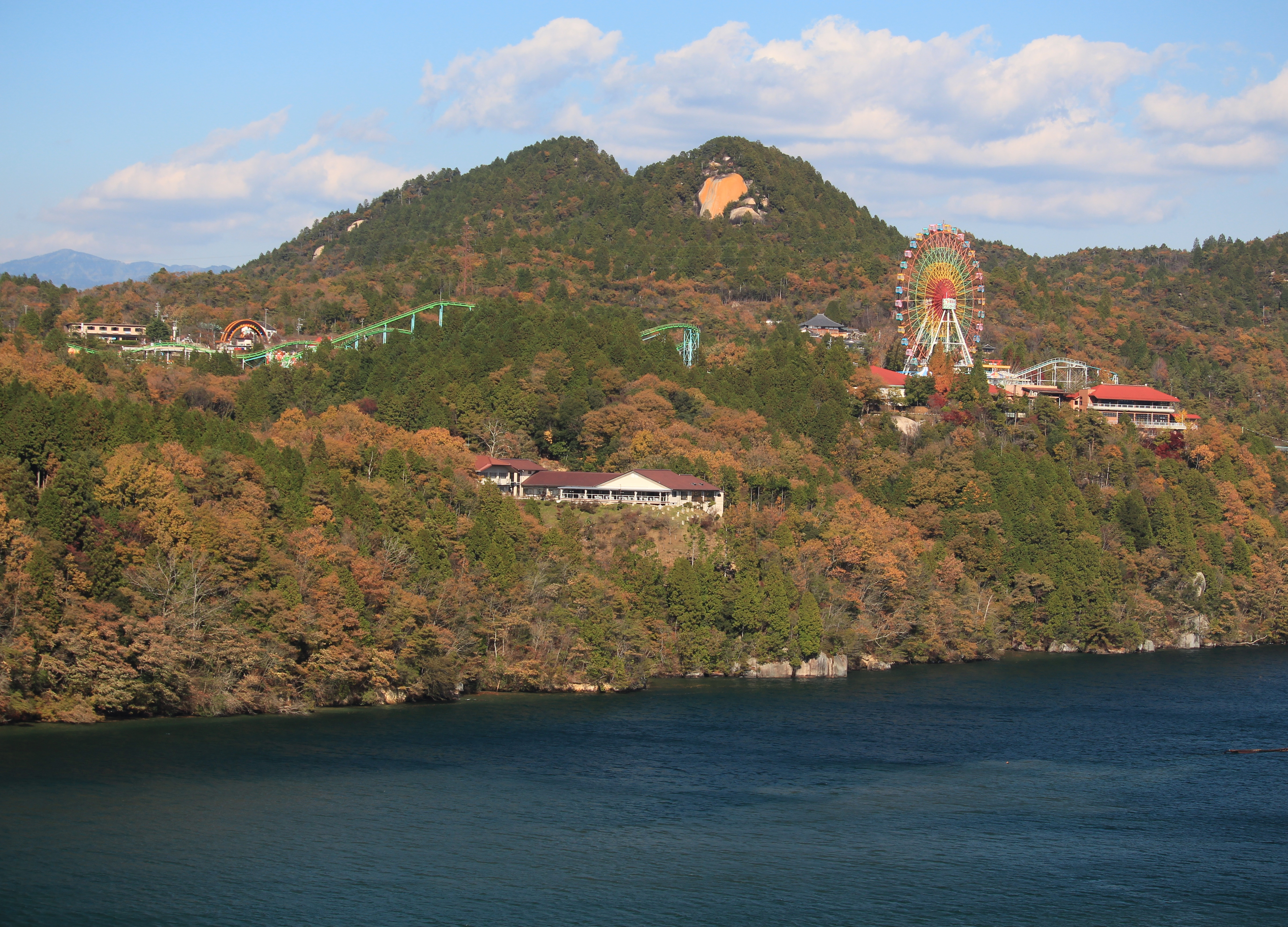
Ena-kyo Wonderland

== Kasa Rock ==
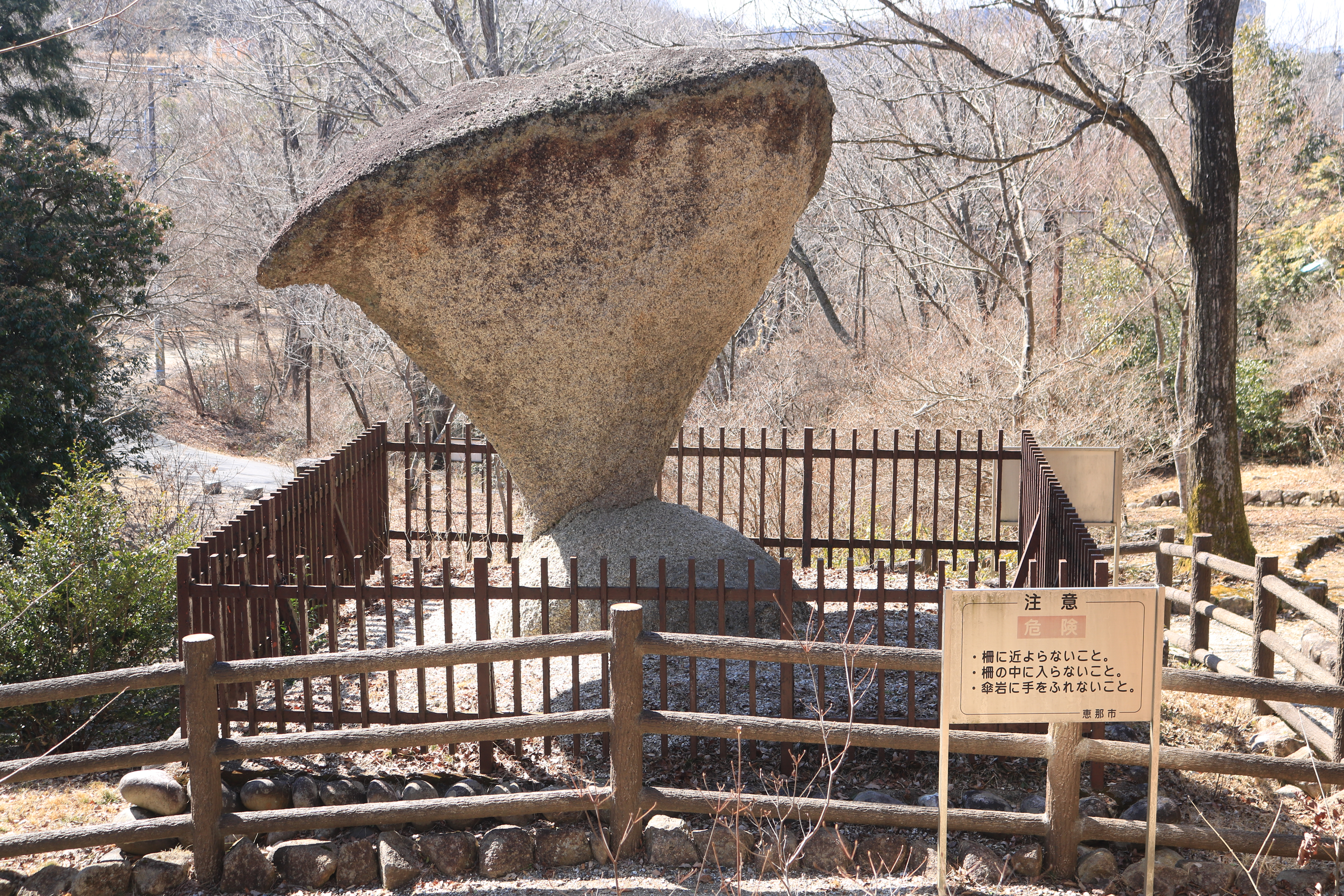
Kasa Rock

Kasa Rock (傘岩, Kasa Ishi or Kasa Iwa) is a rock formation in the Ena Gorge area. It is a National Natural Monument. The rock gets its name from the bottom part, which is narrow like an umbrella. The rock is made of black mica-granite. And was shaped by weathering and erosion caused by water and rainfall. At its widest, the rock has a diameter of 3.3 meters, and at its narrowest less than one meter.

== See also ==
- Mino, Gifu
- List of canyons and gorges in Japan
