= Hida-Kisogawa Quasi-National Park =

Quasi-national park in Japan

- 飛騨木曽川国定公園
- IUCN category V (protected landscape/seascape)
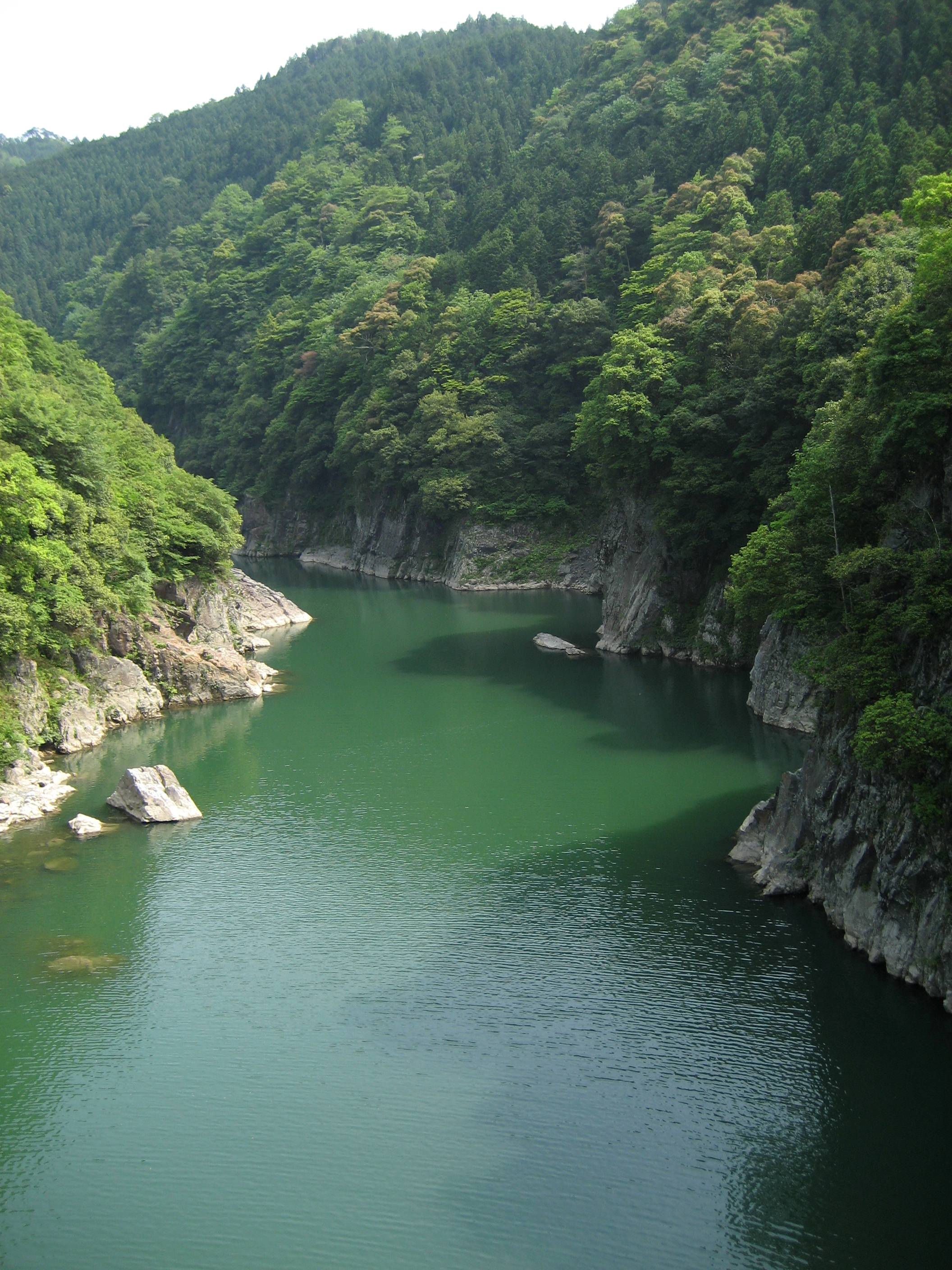
- Sosui Gorge near Maruyama Dam

- Location within Japan
- Location: Gifu and Aichi prefectures, Japan
- Coordinates: 35.444°N 137.054°E
- Area: 18,075 ha (70 mi^{2})
- Established: March 3, 1964
- Visitors: 4,227,000 (in 2005)
- Governing body: Ministry of the Environment

Hida-Kisogawa Quasi-National Park (飛騨木曽川国定公園, Hida Kisogawa Kokutei Kōen) is a quasi-national park in Japan. The park covers the Hida River from Gero to Minokamo in Gifu Prefecture; it also covers the middle reaches of the Kiso River from Mizunami, Gifu Prefecture, to Inuyama, Aichi Prefecture. It was designated a quasi-national park in March 1964.

You also may find Wisteria, Metasequoia and Rhododendron among the plants and flowers in the national park.

== Area communities ==
The park covers the below communities. The bulk of the park's area is within Gifu Prefecture. (Only 3,662 ha (14 mi^{2}) is within the borders of Aichi Prefecture.)

Gifu Prefecture
Kakamigahara, Mizunami, Minokamo, Ena, Sakahogi, Yaotsu, Kawabe, Hichisō, Shirakawa, Mitake
Aichi Prefecture
Inuyama

== See also ==
- List of national parks of Japan
