= Gifu =

City in Gifu Prefecture, Japan

Gifu 岐阜市
- Prefecture capital and Core city
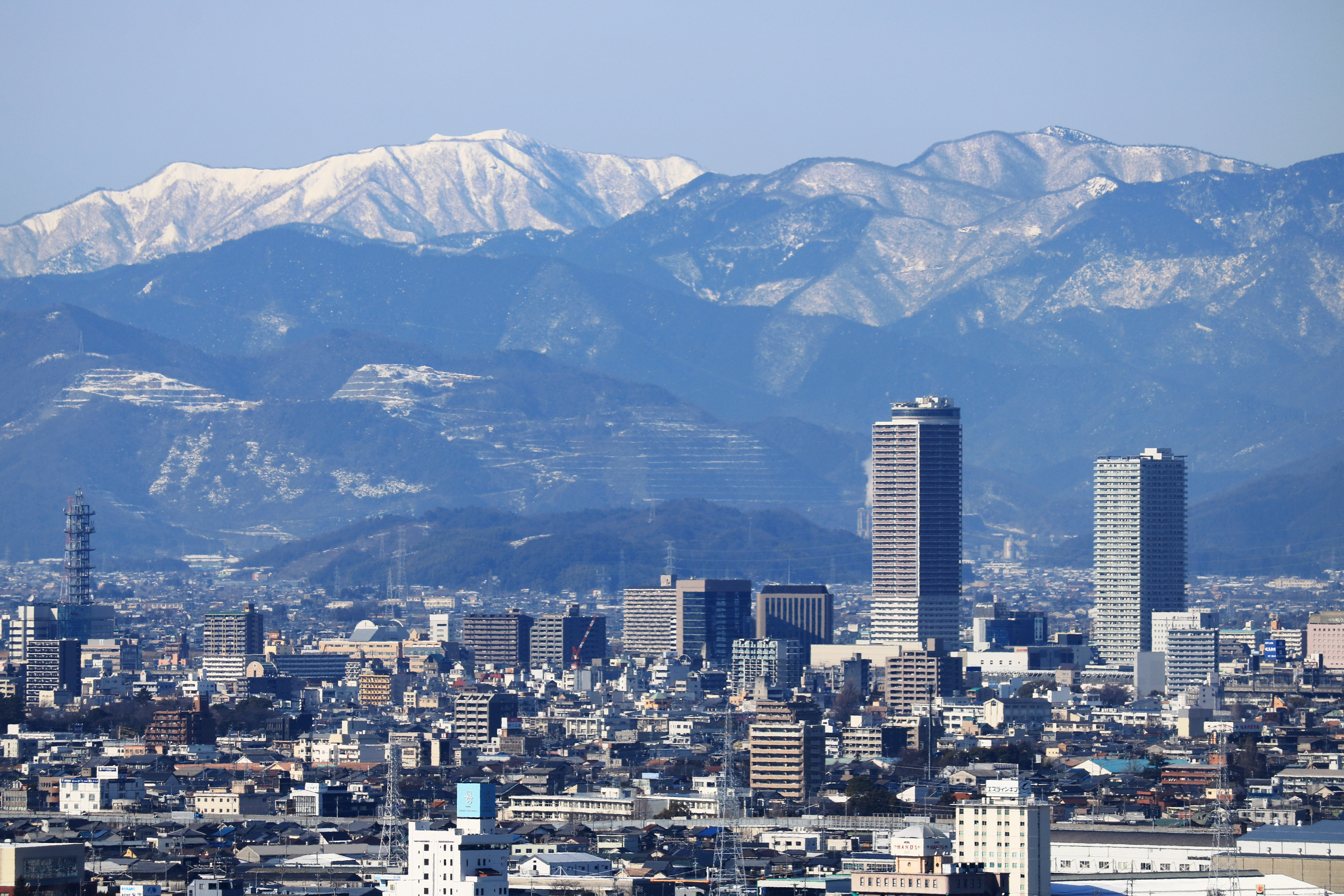

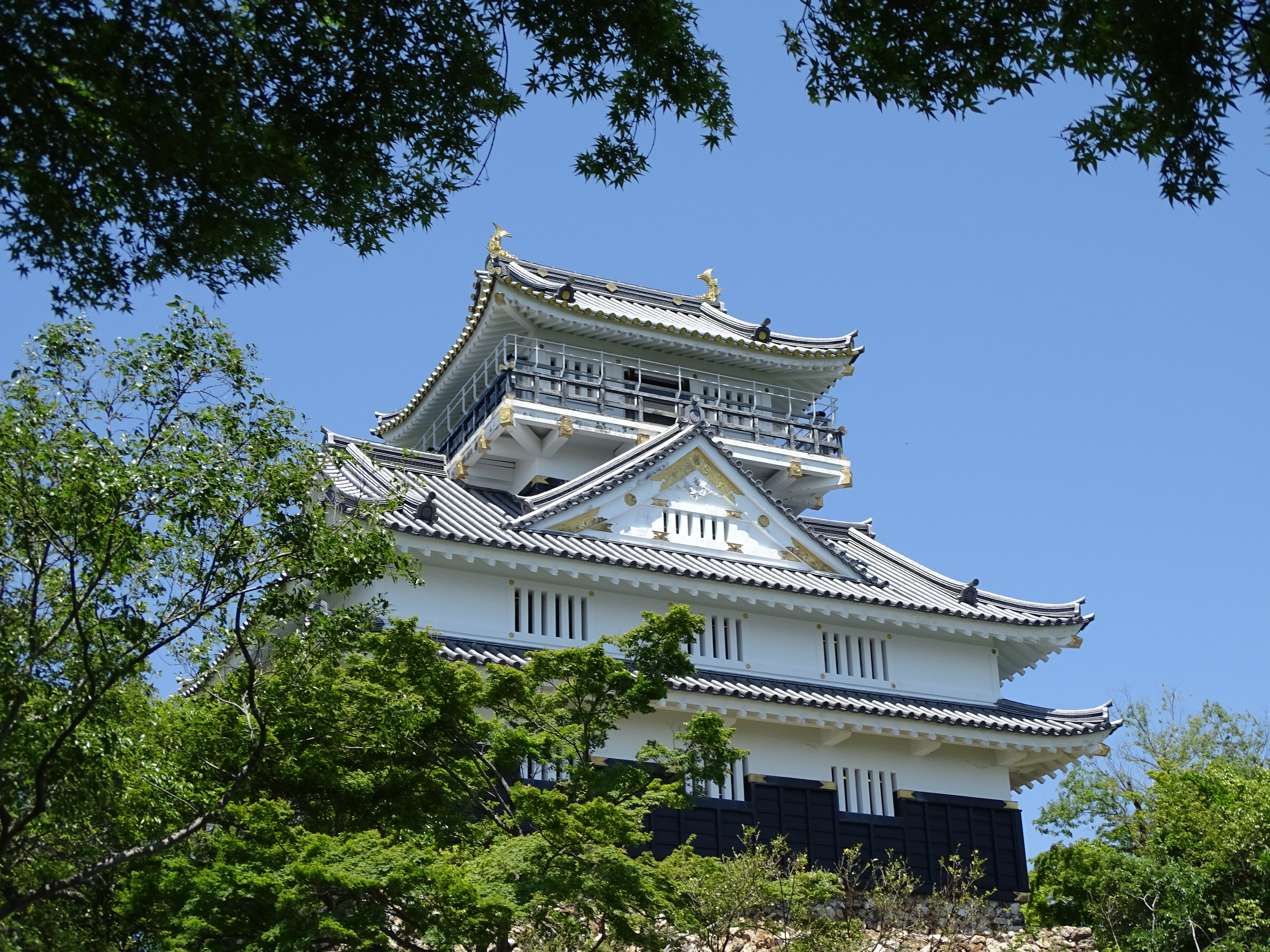

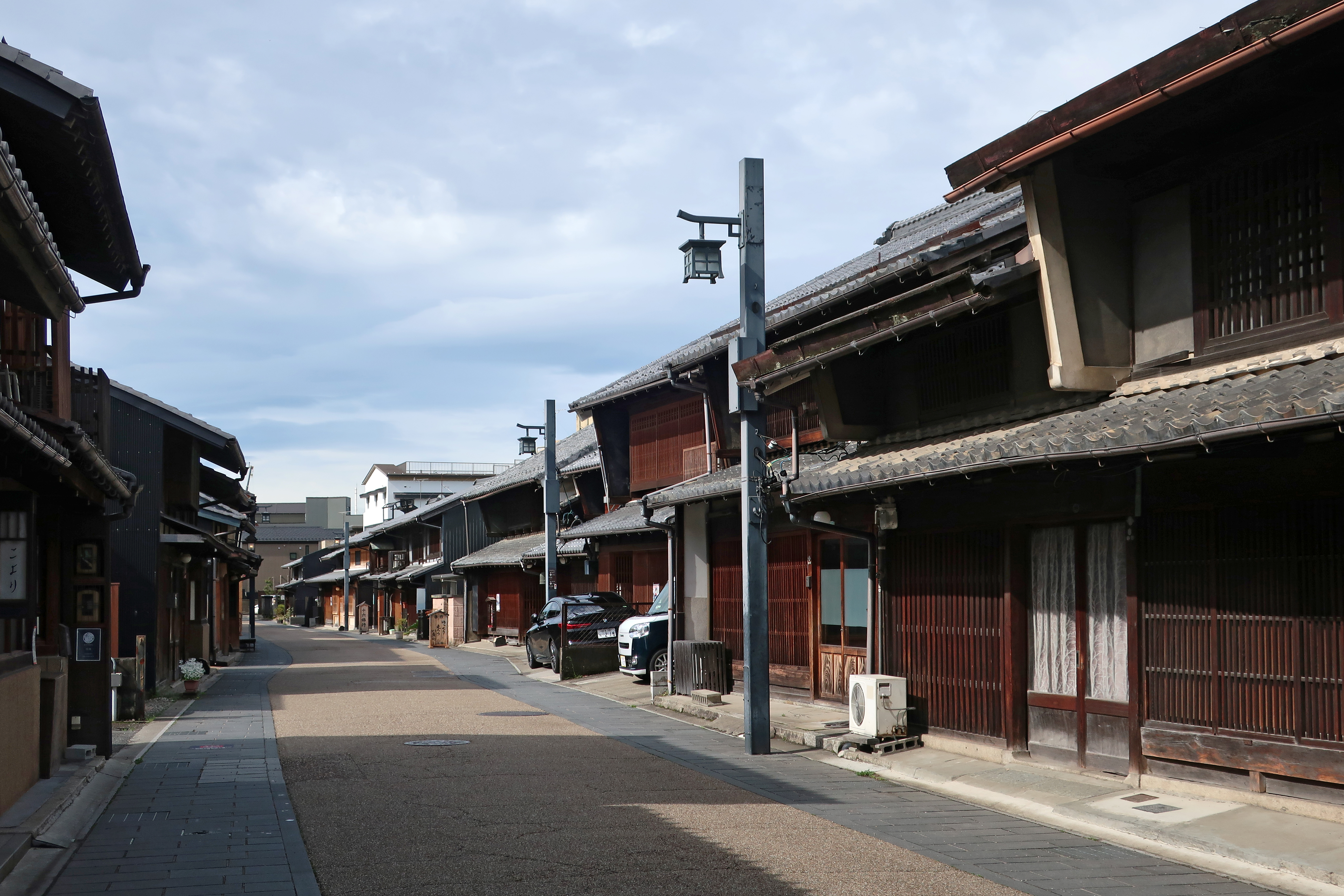

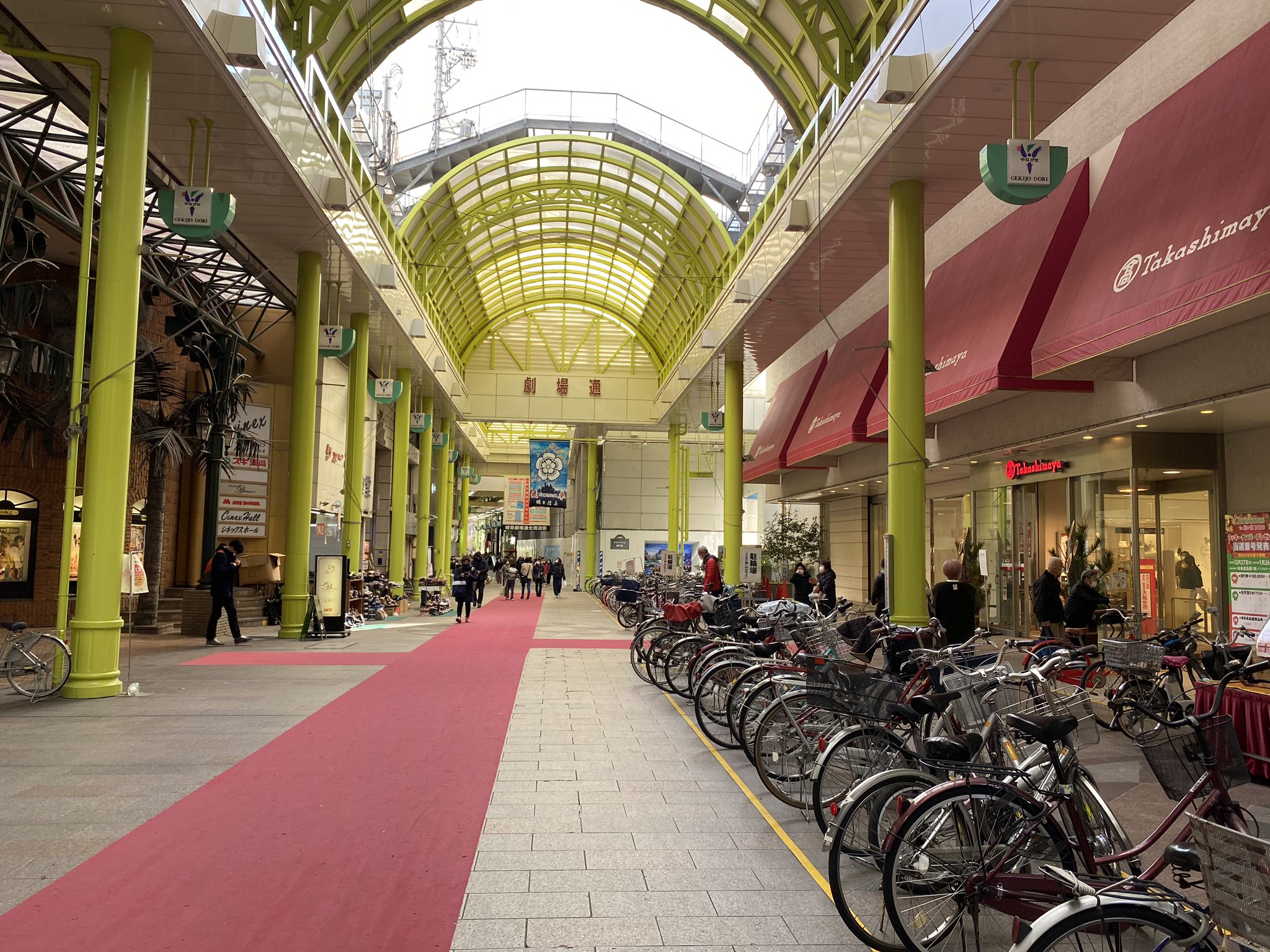

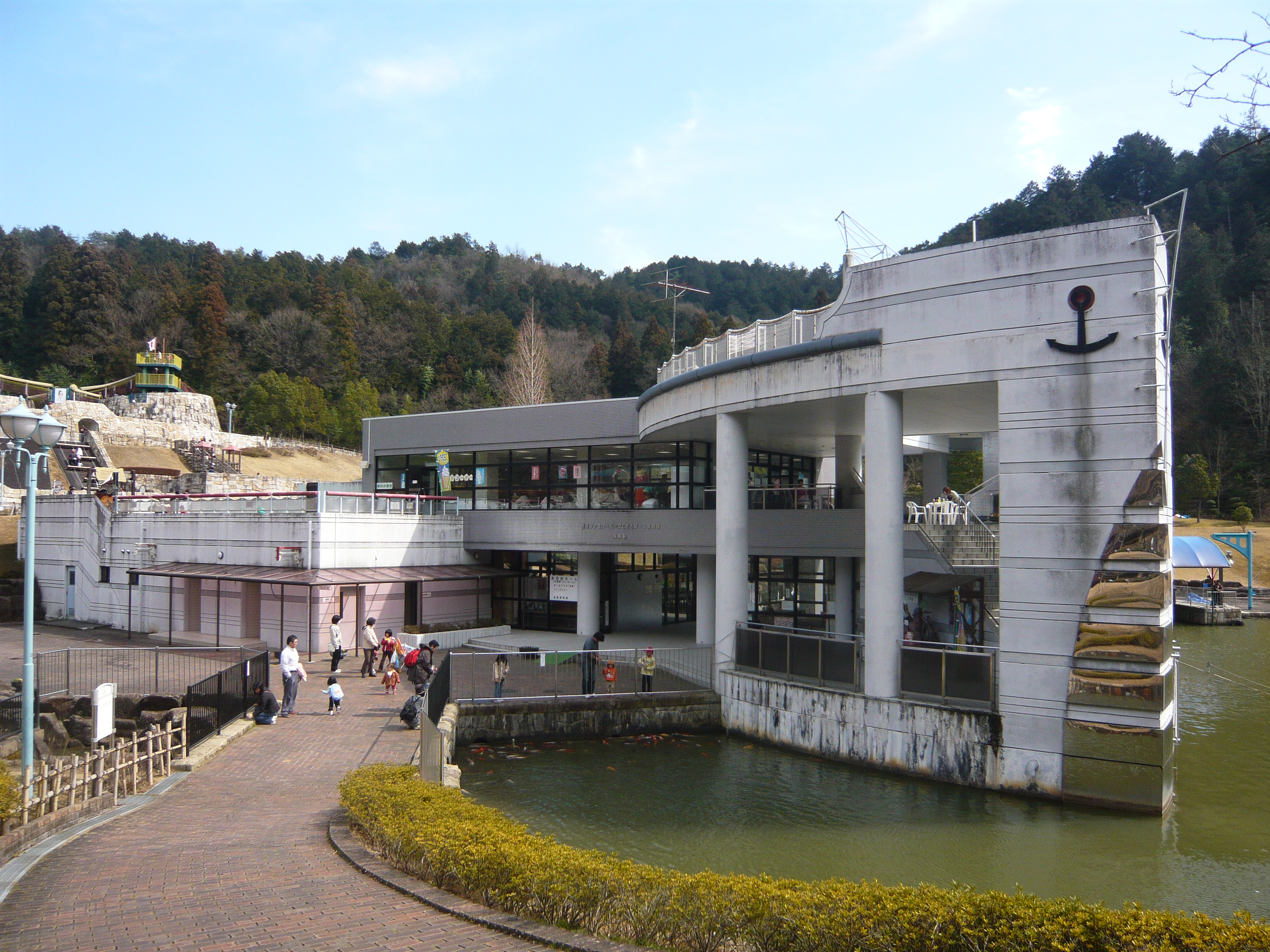

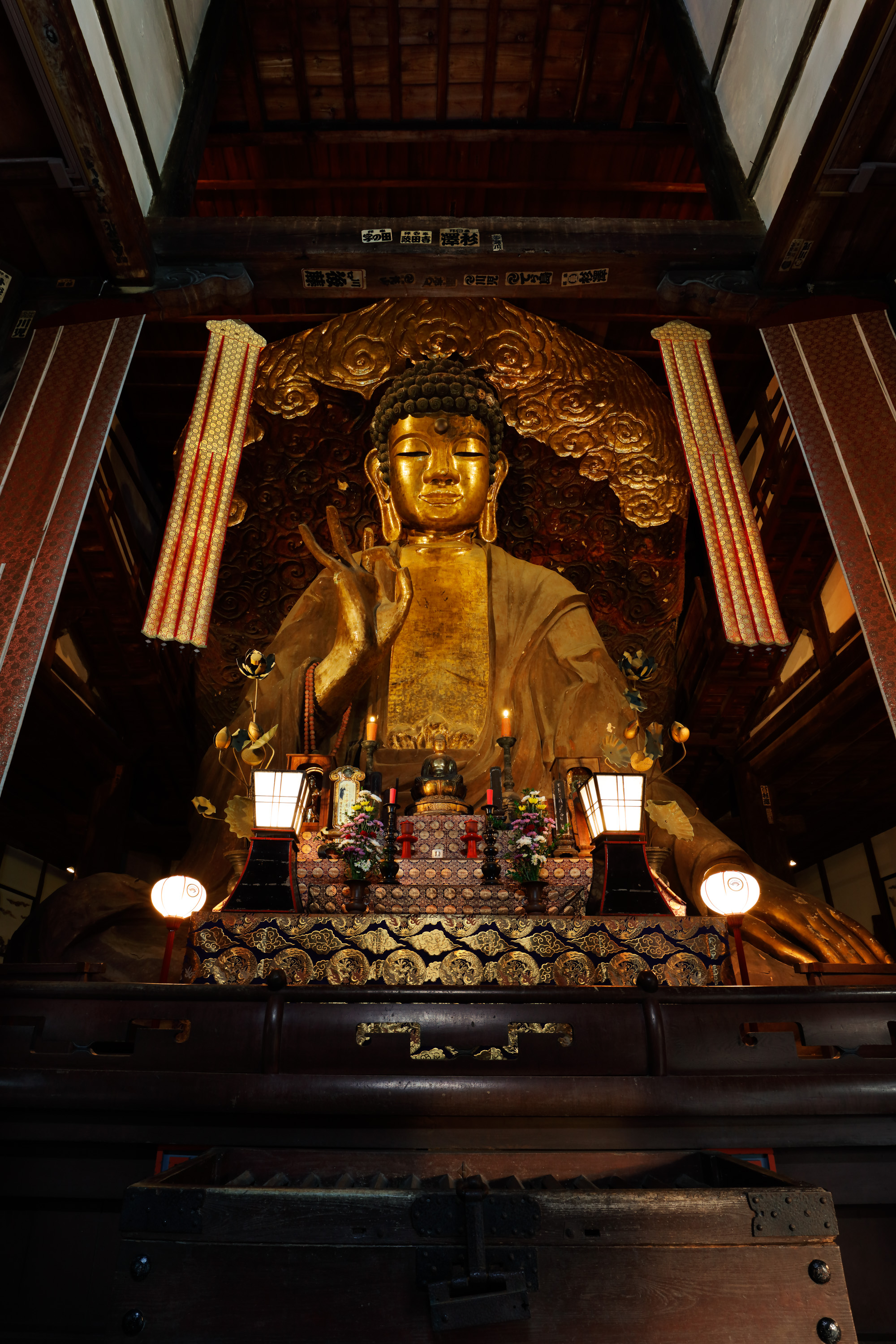

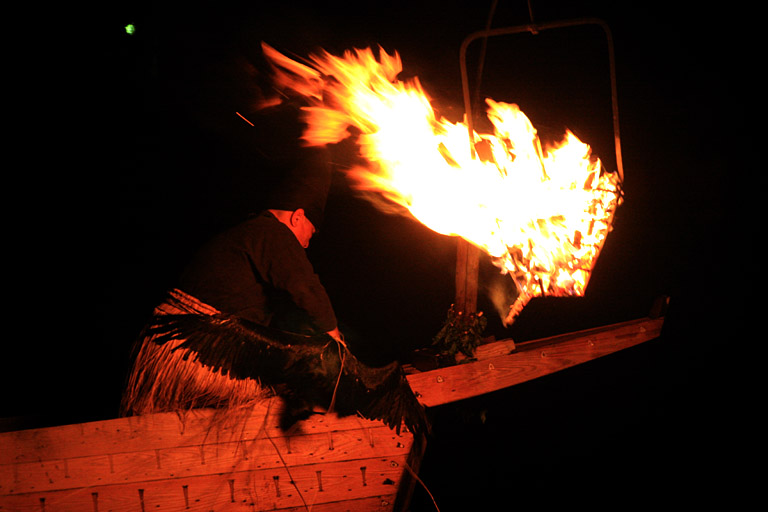
Seen from Twin Arch 138 Gifu city distant view and Mt. Hanafusa
Gifu Castle	Kawaramachi
Yanagase	Gifu Family Park
Gifu Great Buddha	Cormorant fishing on the Nagara River
- Flag Seal
- Interactive map of Gifu
- Coordinates: 35°25′23.6″N 136°45′38.8″E
- Country: Japan
- Region: Chūbu (Tōkai)
- Prefecture: Gifu

Government
  - Mayor: Masanao Shibahashi

Area
  - Total: 203.60 km^{2} (78.61 sq mi)

Population (May 1, 2026)
  - Total: 388,314
  - Density: 1,907.2/km^{2} (4,939.7/sq mi)
- Time zone: UTC+9 (Japan Standard Time)
- City symbols
- Tree: Japanese Chinquapin
- Flower: Scarlet Sage
- Phone number: 0581-22-2111
- Address: 18 Imazawa-chō, Gifu-shi, Gifu-ken 500-8701
- Website: www.city.gifu.lg.jp

Gifu (岐阜市, Gifu-shi; Japanese pronunciation: [ɡ̟ʲì.ɸɯ̈́, -ɸɯ̥̈.ɕì]) is a city located in the south-central portion of Gifu Prefecture, Japan, and serves as the prefectural capital. The city has played an important strategic role in Japan's history because of its location in the middle of the country. During the Sengoku period, various warlords used the area as a base in their efforts to unify and control Japan. Among them was Oda Nobunaga, who gave the region the name it is known by today. Gifu continued to flourish even after Japan's unification as both an important shukuba along the Edo period Nakasendō and, later, as one of Japan's fashion centers. It has been designated a core city by the national government. The city is a part of the Chūkyō metropolitan area, centered around Nagoya.

== Overview ==
Located on the alluvial plain of the Nagara River, Gifu has taken advantage of the surrounding natural resources to create both traditional industries (including Mino washi and agriculture) and tourism opportunities such as cormorant fishing. Mount Kinka, one of the city's major symbols, is home to a nationally designated forest and Gifu Castle, a replica of Nobunaga's former castle. Gifu also hosts many festivals and events throughout the year.

Two major rail lines connect Gifu to Japan's national and international transportation infrastructure. JR Central's Tōkaidō Main Line runs through the city, connecting it with Nagoya, one of Japan's largest cities, and the surrounding area. The city has a direct train route to Chubu Centrair International Airport and facilities capable of hosting international events. Gifu has active relationships with six sister cities.

As of 1 June 2019, the city has an estimated population of 401,534 in 178,246 households, and a population density of about 1,972 inhabitants per square kilometre (5,110/sq mi). The total area of the city was 203.60 square kilometers (78.61 sq mi).

=== Cityscape ===
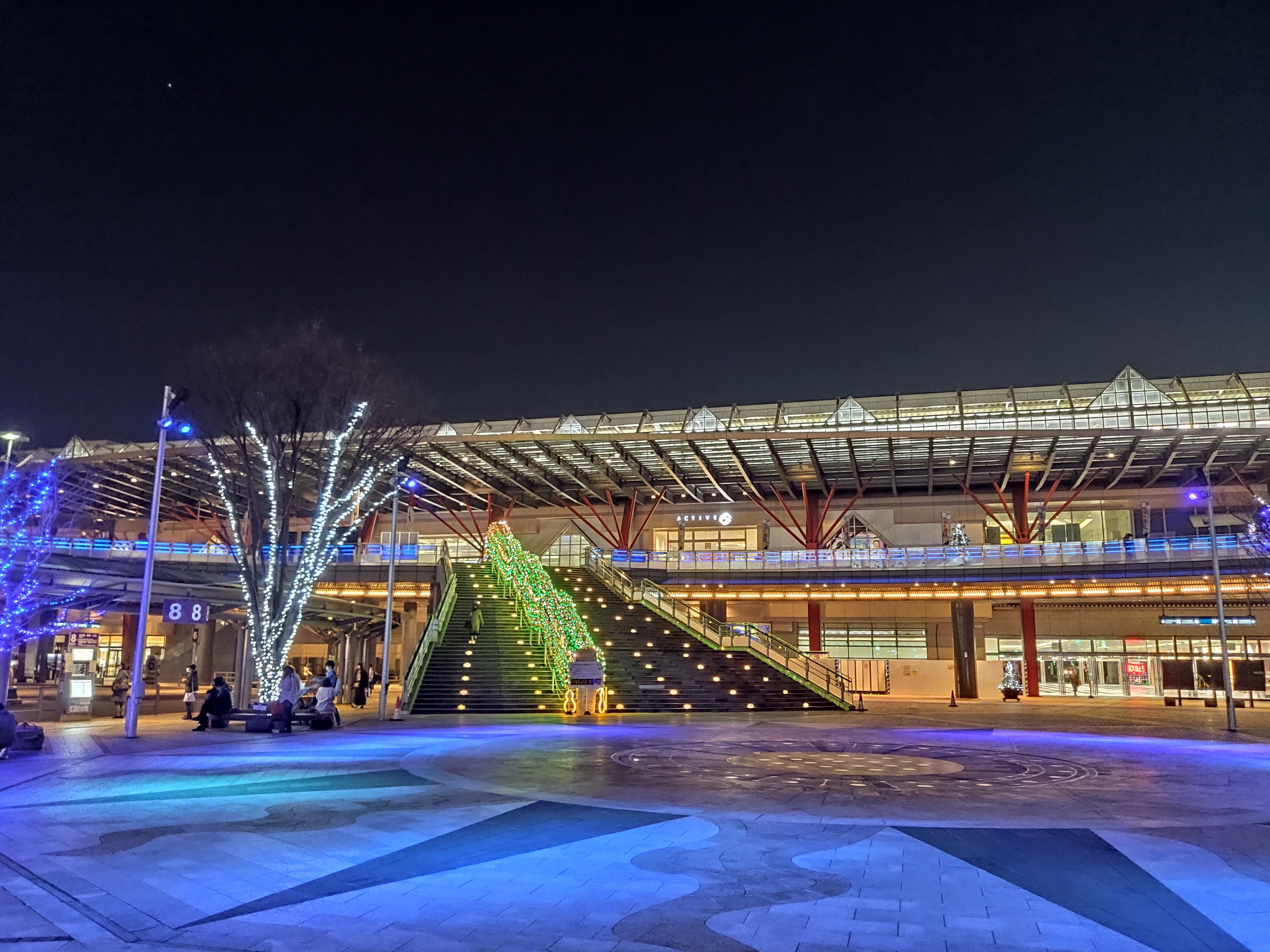
Gifu Station (2021)

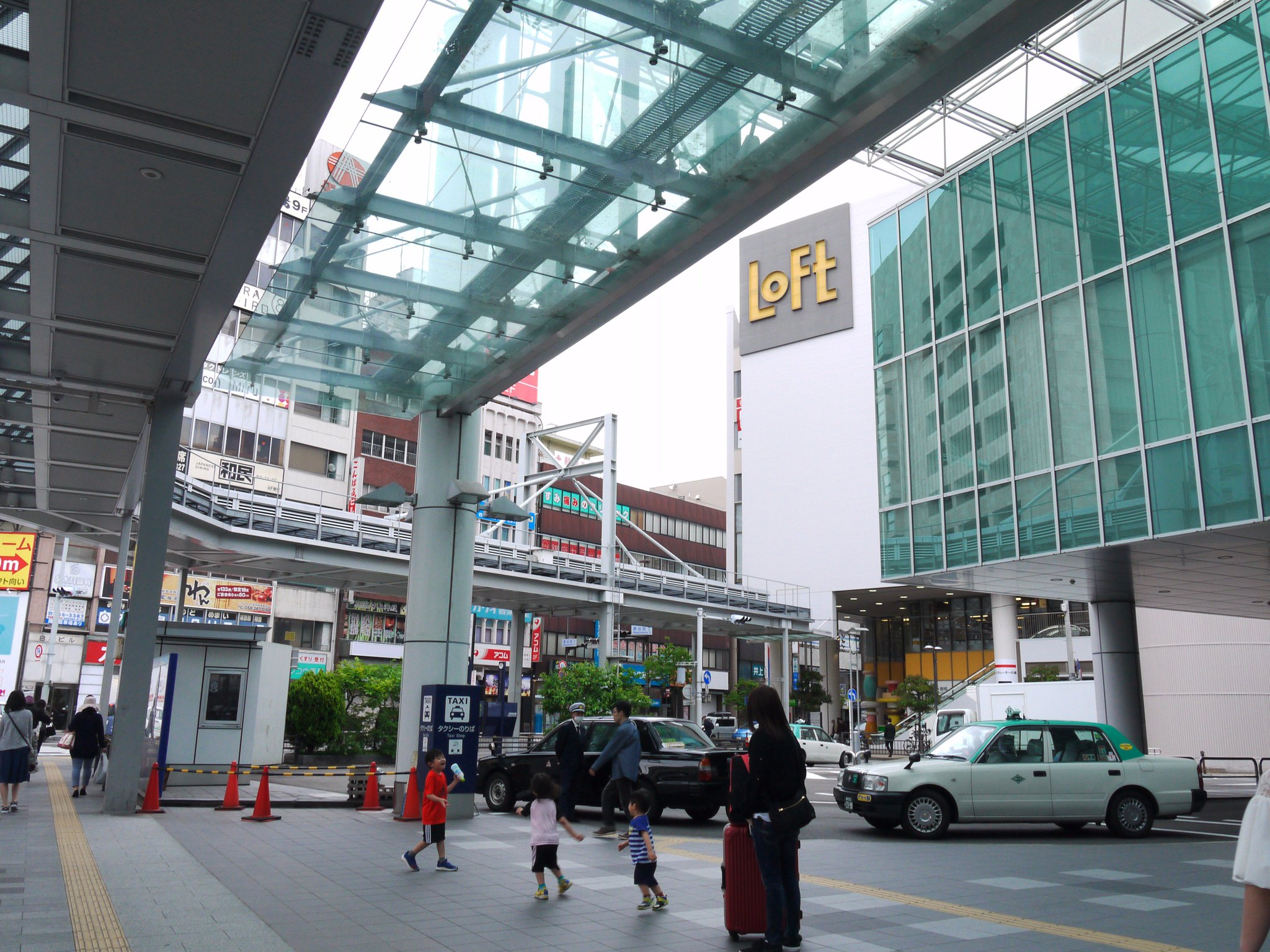
Meitetsu Gifu Station (2021)

Various Gifu city views seen from Gifu City Tower 43 (2022)

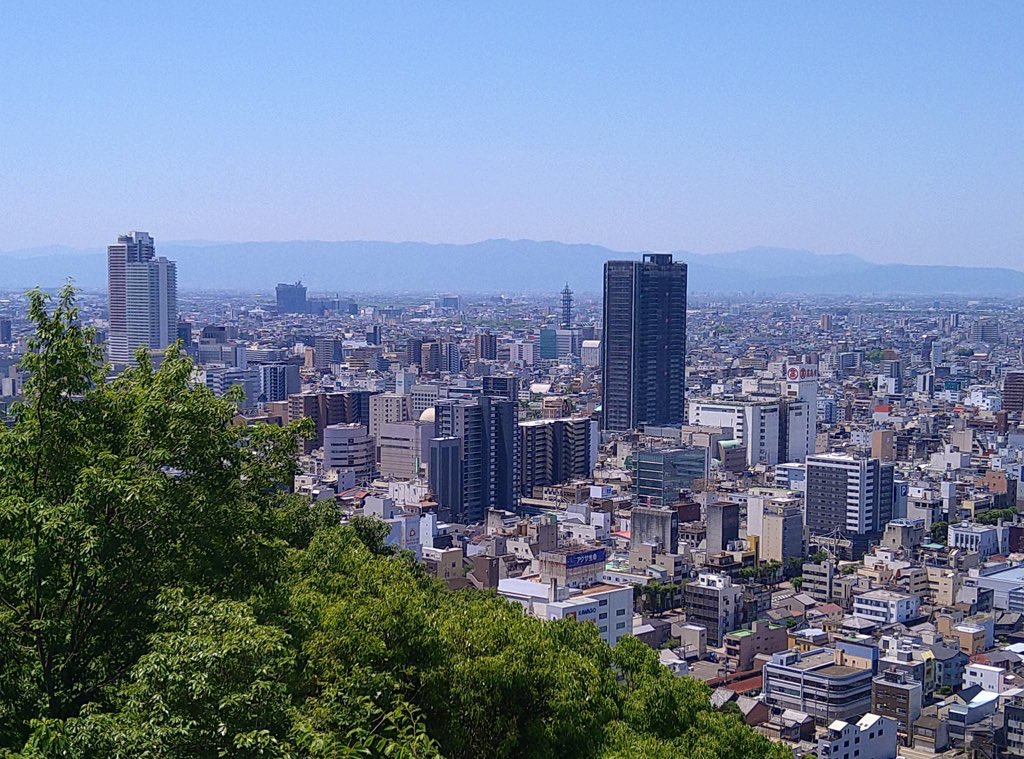
CBD of Gifu viewed from Gifu Castle

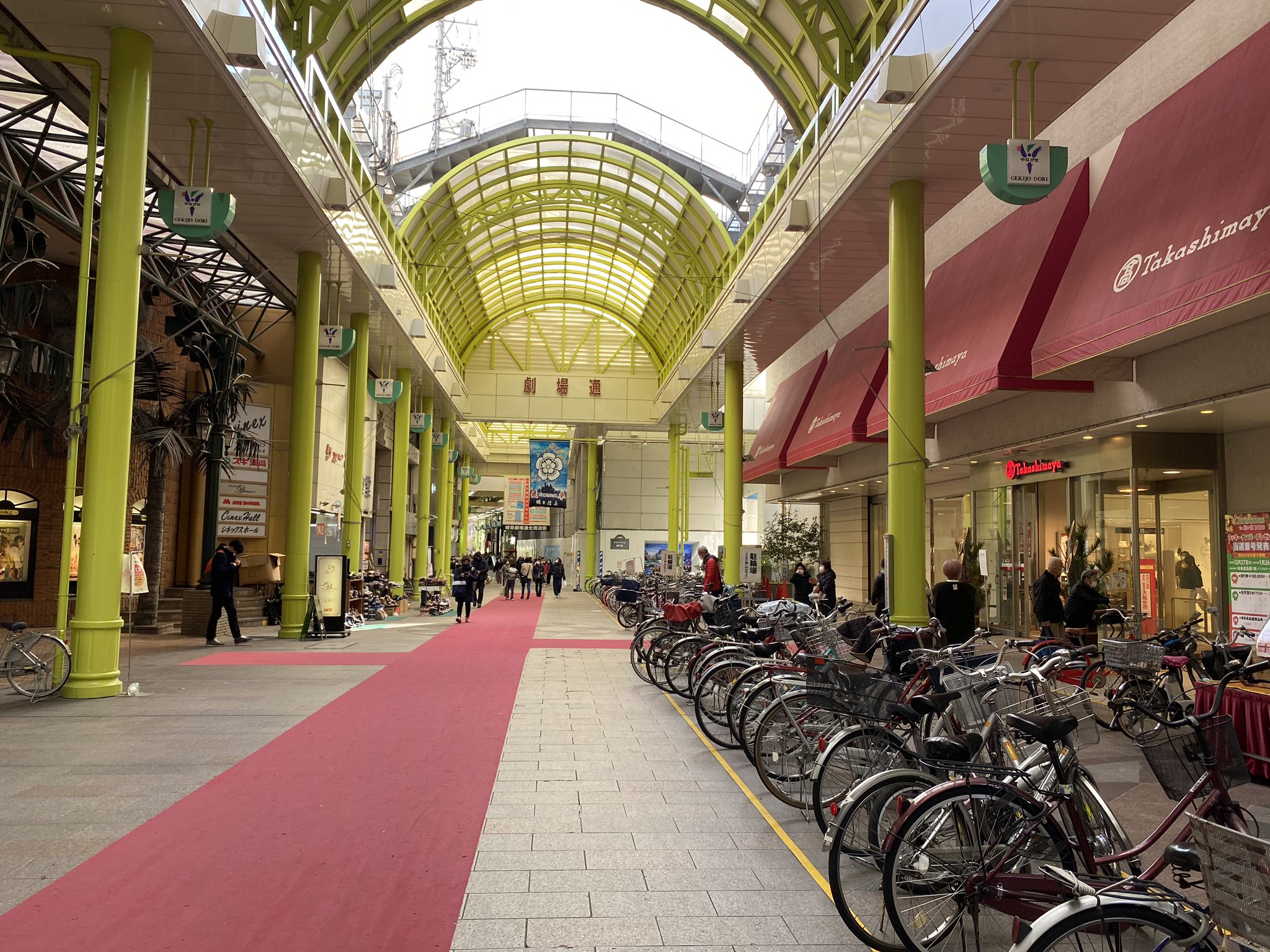
Yanagase area (2020)

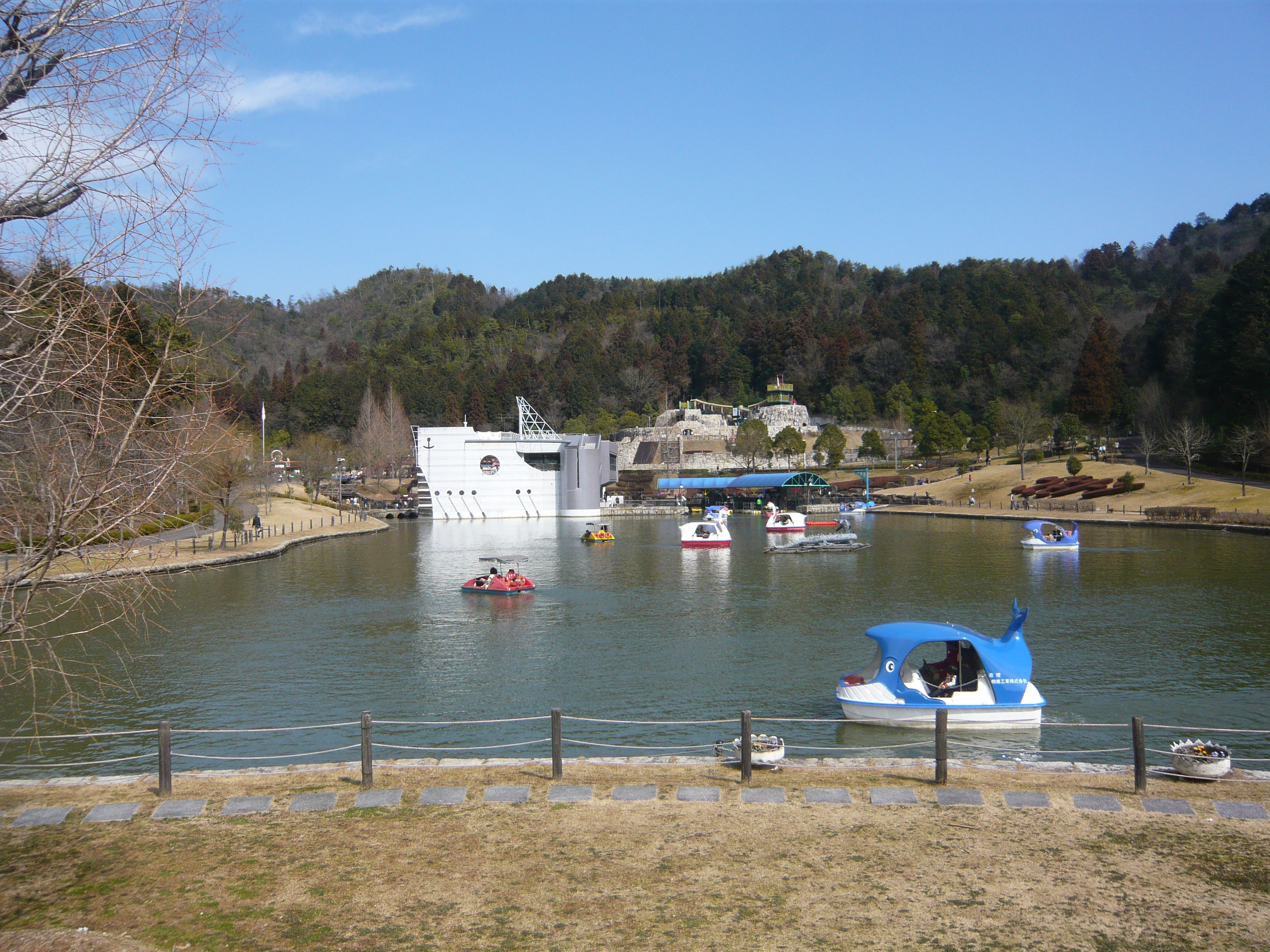
Gifu Family Park (2009)

== Geography ==
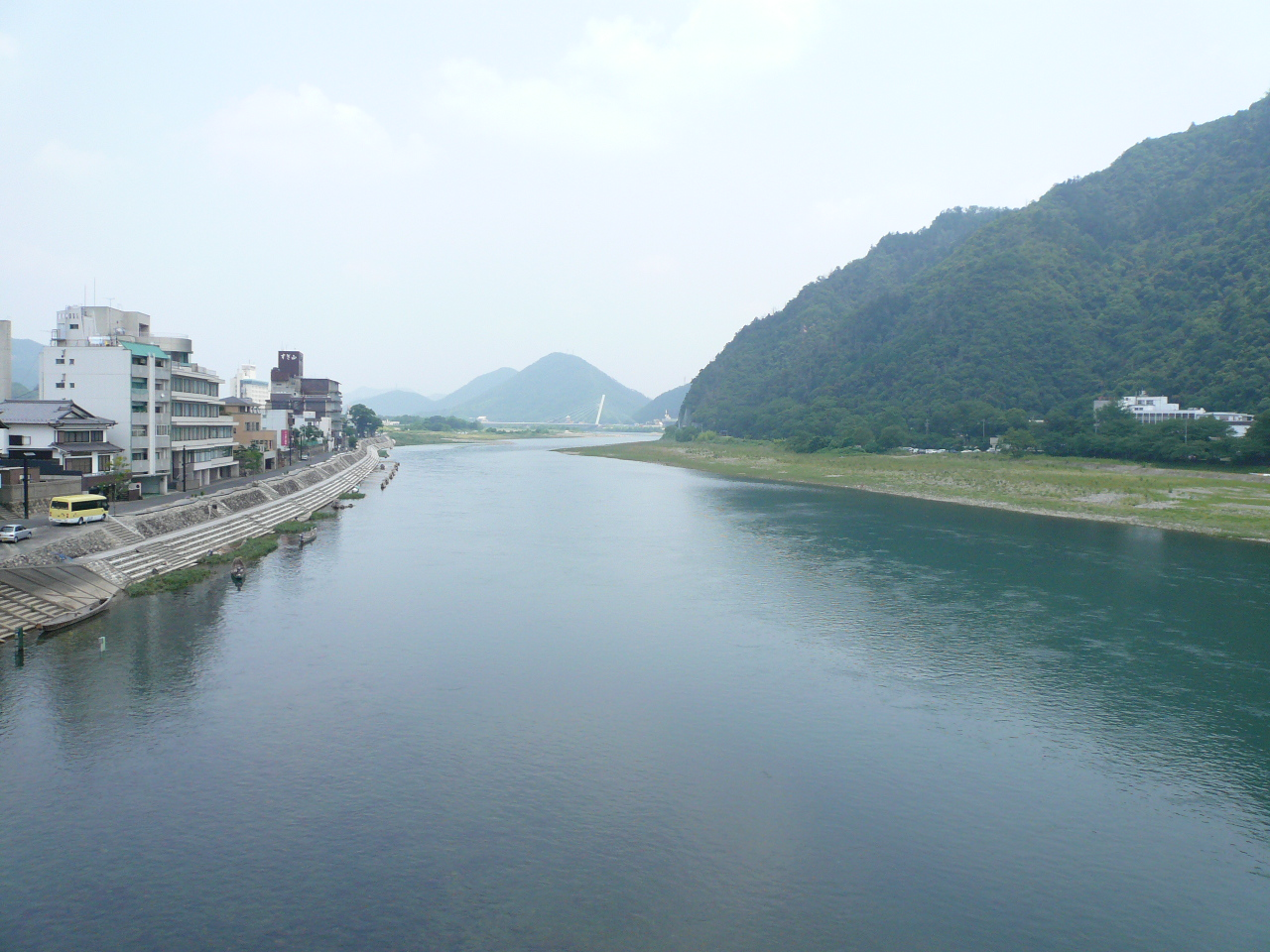
Nagara River flowing through Gifu

The city of Gifu is located in the southern portion of the prefecture and is on the northern edge of the Nōbi Plain. It is also the main city of the Gifu region of the prefecture. Much of Gifu's land area has been gained as the result of mergers, but the city's size grew the most through mergers with the neighboring towns of Kanō (in 1940) and Yanaizu (in 2006). As a result, Gifu's geography is very diverse, ranging from the built-up city center to persimmon orchards and strawberry patches in the outlying areas. The northern part of the city is bordered by tree-covered mountains, whereas most of the city center is spread throughout the southern part. The Nagara River cuts the city in half, running from the northeast to the southwest. Much of the city is part of the Nagara River's alluvial plain and an environmental conservation district. Because of the formation of the river, the area is prone to flooding when typhoons or heavy thunderstorms occur; however, dykes and levies have been built to control the excess water. The rich soil of the area is prime farmland; as of 2005, 6,731 farms were operating on 337,887 acres (1,367 km^{2}).

=== Climate ===
Gifu experiences a wide range of weather throughout the year, but in general is characterized by hot and humid summers, and mild winters (Köppen climate classification Cfa). The average annual temperature in Gifu is 15.5 °C (59.9 °F). The average annual rainfall is 1,799 mm (70.8 in) with September as the wettest month. The temperatures are highest on average in August and lowest in January. Gifu recorded a record high of 39.8 °C (103.6 °F) on August 16, 2007 and record low of −14.3 °C (6.3 °F) on January 24, 1927.

Climate data for Gifu (1991−2020 normals, extremes 1883−present)
Month	Jan	Feb	Mar	Apr	May	Jun	Jul	Aug	Sep	Oct	Nov	Dec	Year
Record high °C (°F)	20.4 (68.7)	22.2 (72.0)	25.8 (78.4)	30.8 (87.4)	33.7 (92.7)	38.2 (100.8)	39.7 (103.5)	39.8 (103.6)	37.8 (100.0)	33.5 (92.3)	26.7 (80.1)	22.1 (71.8)	39.8 (103.6)
Mean maximum °C (°F)	13.9 (57.0)	17.1 (62.8)	21.2 (70.2)	27.1 (80.8)	31.2 (88.2)	33.5 (92.3)	36.6 (97.9)	37.4 (99.3)	34.3 (93.7)	29.1 (84.4)	23.2 (73.8)	17.5 (63.5)	37.7 (99.9)
Mean daily maximum °C (°F)	9.1 (48.4)	10.3 (50.5)	14.2 (57.6)	20.0 (68.0)	24.7 (76.5)	27.8 (82.0)	31.6 (88.9)	33.4 (92.1)	29.2 (84.6)	23.6 (74.5)	17.5 (63.5)	11.6 (52.9)	21.1 (70.0)
Daily mean °C (°F)	4.6 (40.3)	5.4 (41.7)	9.0 (48.2)	14.5 (58.1)	19.4 (66.9)	23.2 (73.8)	27.0 (80.6)	28.3 (82.9)	24.5 (76.1)	18.7 (65.7)	12.5 (54.5)	7.0 (44.6)	16.2 (61.2)
Mean daily minimum °C (°F)	0.7 (33.3)	1.2 (34.2)	4.2 (39.6)	9.4 (48.9)	14.6 (58.3)	19.3 (66.7)	23.5 (74.3)	24.6 (76.3)	20.8 (69.4)	14.5 (58.1)	8.1 (46.6)	3.0 (37.4)	12.0 (53.6)
Mean minimum °C (°F)	−3.1 (26.4)	−3.0 (26.6)	−0.9 (30.4)	2.7 (36.9)	9.1 (48.4)	14.9 (58.8)	19.8 (67.6)	20.8 (69.4)	14.9 (58.8)	8.3 (46.9)	2.7 (36.9)	−1.6 (29.1)	−3.8 (25.2)
Record low °C (°F)	−14.3 (6.3)	−13.7 (7.3)	−6.7 (19.9)	−2.8 (27.0)	1.7 (35.1)	6.8 (44.2)	12.8 (55.0)	14.0 (57.2)	8.3 (46.9)	0.8 (33.4)	−2.4 (27.7)	−8.7 (16.3)	−14.3 (6.3)
Average precipitation mm (inches)	65.9 (2.59)	77.5 (3.05)	132.4 (5.21)	162.4 (6.39)	192.6 (7.58)	223.7 (8.81)	270.9 (10.67)	169.5 (6.67)	242.7 (9.56)	161.6 (6.36)	87.1 (3.43)	74.5 (2.93)	1,860.7 (73.26)
Average snowfall cm (inches)	14 (5.5)	10 (3.9)	1 (0.4)	0 (0)	0 (0)	0 (0)	0 (0)	0 (0)	0 (0)	0 (0)	0 (0)	9 (3.5)	34 (13)
Average precipitation days (≥ 0.5 mm)	9.0	9.3	10.4	10.5	10.9	12.6	13.8	10.7	12.5	9.6	7.8	10.1	127.2
Average relative humidity (%)	66	62	58	59	63	70	73	69	70	67	67	68	66
Mean monthly sunshine hours	161.3	165.7	196.2	200.0	205.4	160.1	166.5	202.4	163.7	172.8	158.8	155.6	2,108.6
Source: Japan Meteorological Agency

=== Surrounding municipalities ===
Gifu Prefecture

- Ginan
- Hashima
- Kakamigahara
- Kasamatsu
- Kitagata
- Mizuho
- Motosu
- Ōgaki
- Seki
- Yamagata

== Demographics ==
When Gifu was founded in 1889, it was a small city that experienced moderate growth as Japan industrialized at the beginning of the century. During Japan's military buildup in the 1930s, the city became an industrial center and experienced exponential growth. Gifu remained prosperous in the post-war years, until its population started to decline like many Japanese cities in the 1980s and '90s. Though the city has shown a large increase in population in recent years, this trend results largely from the inclusion, for the first time, of the population of Yanaizu, which added about 13,000 people to Gifu's numbers. Foreign residents of the city, who number over 9,000, also factor into this growth. Shortly after this change, however, the city's economic revival strengthened and the population began to show a true increase, although this has reversed in recent decades.

Gifu's estimated population, as of July 2011, is 412,895. The gender breakdown is 196,762 males and 216,133 females, with a total of 162,060 households within the city limits. Similar to many areas in Japan, the percentage of senior citizens over 65 years of age is approximately 21.67%, compared to only 14.13% of the population younger than 15. This is comparable to the population of the prefecture and of Japan as a whole. In the prefecture, 22.1% of the population is over 65 and 14.4% of the population is less than 15 years old. Throughout Japan, only 21% are over the age of 65 and 13.6% are younger than 15 as of 2008. The average age of city residents is 43.37. As of 2022, the population of Gifu stands at 401,779.

Historical population

Year	Pop.	±%
1889	25,750	—
1910	42,916	+66.7%
1920	62,713	+46.1%
1930	90,112	+43.7%
1940	172,340	+91.3%
1950	211,845	+22.9%
1960	304,492	+43.7%

Year	Pop.	±%
1970	385,727	+26.7%
1980	410,254	+6.4%
1990	410,324	+0.0%
2000	415,085	+1.2%
2010	413,136	−0.5%
2020	402,557	−2.6%

== History ==
Two archaeological sites in the city of Gifu have shown that the area around modern-day Gifu has had residents since pre-history because of Gifu's location in the fertile Nōbi Plain. The Ryomonji and Kotozuka sites have produced large burial mounds that are representative of the late-Yayoi period, which is when rice cultivation began in Japan. As civilization in Japan grew, permanent settlements began to appear and, eventually, the village of Inokuchi was established, which would eventually become the modern city of Gifu.

=== Sengoku period ===
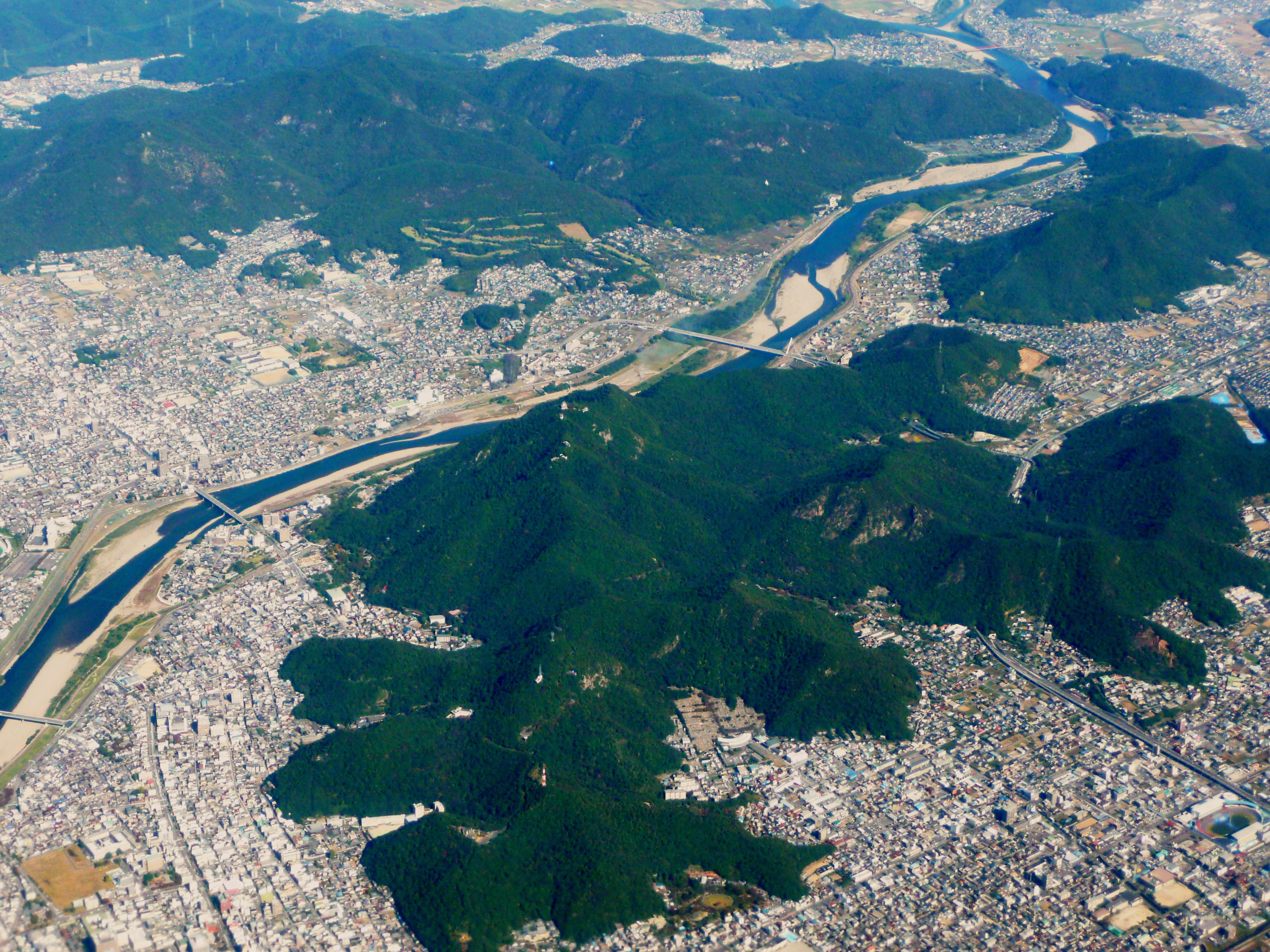
Mount Kinka (formerly Mount Inaba)

"Control Gifu and you control Japan" was a common phrase during the Sengoku period (15th to 17th century), since Gifu's central location in Japan made it a desirable location for those trying to unify the country. For over 200 years, the Mino Province (including the present-day city of Gifu) was under control of the Toki clan, a powerful regional clan. However, during the Sengoku period, Saitō Dōsan, a Toki vassal, rebelled against his clan and took control of Mino Province in 1542 and built Inabayama Castle atop Mount Inaba, from which he began his quest to unify Japan.

During Dōsan's reign, his daughter Nōhime married Oda Nobunaga, the heir of the fast rising clan in the neighboring Owari Province, with the hopes of an alliance of the two families' would present a powerful front against their competitors. However, it would be Nobunaga that eventually absorbed Dōsan's Saitō clan in the mid-sixteenth century, as Dōsan had done to his retainer. It was during Nobunaga's reign of power that the area finally received its modern name. After consulting with a Buddhist priest, Nobunaga renamed the village and the surrounding Mino Province to Gifu in 1567. He took the first character (岐 gi) from Qishan (岐山), the legendary mountain from which most of ancient China was unified. The second character (阜 fu) means "base of the mountain" and comes from Qufu (曲阜), the birthplace of Confucius. Though he was not originally from the area, Nobunaga chose to use Dōsan's castle and mountain as his base of operations, which he renamed Gifu Castle and Mount Kinka, respectively. In 1586, the Tenshō earthquake with an estimated magnitude of 7.9 affected the region, killing several thousand people.

Gifu's economy grew immensely during this period, primarily due to its location at the center of Nobunaga's expanding empire. Additionally, Nobunaga established Rakuichi Rakuza (楽市楽座), a free market for his citizens to use, in direct response to the commercial monopoly of the area's temples and shrines. The liveliness of the town caused Luís Fróis, a Portuguese Jesuit Missionary and guest of Nobunaga, to describe Gifu as a "bustling Babylon".

=== Edo and Meiji periods ===
Following the death of Nobunaga, Gifu's growth continued through the Edo period with the establishment of the Nakasendō as one of Tokugawa's five routes. Although the route did not pass directly through Gifu, the nearby post towns of Kanō-juku and Gōdo-juku provided traffic and were later amalgamated into the modern city of Gifu. The area continued to prosper once Gifu became a central location along the Nakasendō. The Gifu Goten was established, which later was turned into the magistrate's office.

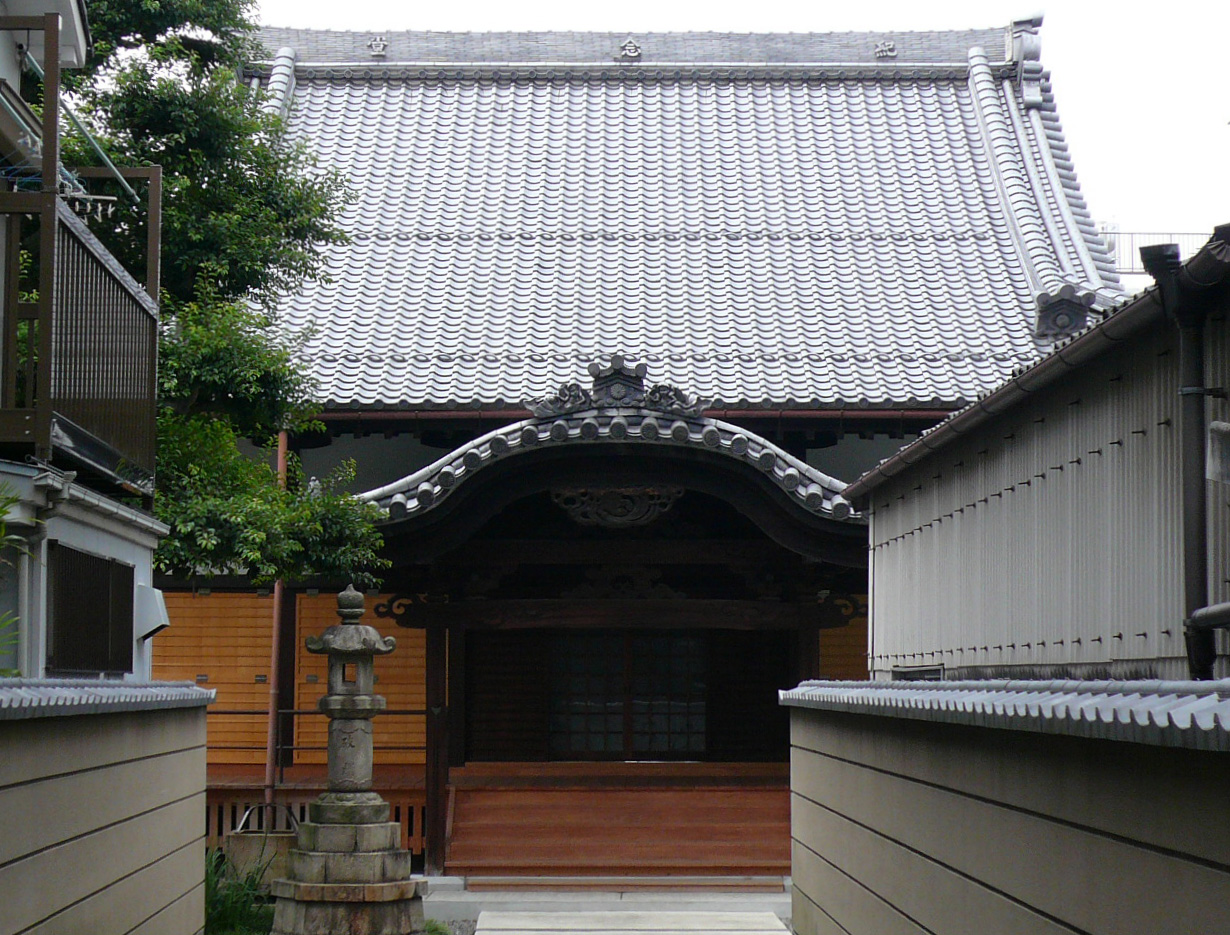
Gifu Earthquake Memorial Hall

In the middle of the Meiji period, Gifu was officially established as a city on July 1, 1889, with an original population of 25,750 people and an area of 10 km^{2}. On October 28, 1891, two years later, the Mino–Owari earthquake occurred, estimated at 8 magnitude on the Richter Scale. About 37% of the city was lost to fire, resulting in 1,505 casualties (245 dead, 1,260 injured) and 6,336 buildings affected (3,993 of which were completely destroyed). As a result, Gifu erected the first Earthquake Memorial Hall in all of Japan, which holds memorial services for the victims on the 28th of every month.

Gifu recovered from the earthquake damage by the end of the Meiji period, and by 1911 was prosperous enough to establish a municipal street car service throughout the city.

=== Pacific War ===
In 1940, Gifu absorbed the former post town of Kanō, greatly increasing its land area. Kanō had many traditional industries, which helped improve Gifu's overall industrial strength. With the neighboring city of Kakamigahara serving as an aeronautics center for Japan, Gifu was a large industrial center during Pacific War, including a downtown manufacturing sector. As a result, Gifu was the target of heavy firebombing by the United States Army Air Forces, culminating in the Gifu Air Raid of July 9, 1945, which resulted in 1,383 casualties (863 dead, 520 injured) and 20,426 buildings affected. Gifu commemorates these events each year on July 9, with the ringing of the Peace Bell at each temple within the city. Its sister cities also take part in these events.

During the Pacific War, Gifu also served as the base for the creation of Japan's fire balloons. These paper-based, bomb-carrying hot air balloons were used in a failed attempt to cause havoc on American soil. Local high school girls made these fire balloons out of Mino washi (a thin but strong Japanese paper) and konnyaku paste. Originally, rubberized silk was used to help these bombs use the newly discovered jet stream to traverse the Pacific Ocean, but Gifu's paper was found to be both stronger, lighter, and more airtight.

=== Modern history ===
In the years following the wars, tragedy struck Gifu once again. On September 12, 1976, Typhoon 17 (Super Typhoon Fran) struck the city, killing five people and affecting over 40,000 families. Gifu recovered, however, through the establishment of various local industries. The city's growth reached such a point that it was designated a core city by the national government in 1996. As its fashion industry has declined, however, the city has been looking towards manufacturing to revive the economy. A recent construction boom, much of which has occurred around JR Gifu Station, has improved the city's economy. Both public construction projects (station area renovations and elevated walkways) and private efforts are revitalizing the city of Gifu. Gifu City Tower 43 is an example of cooperation between the public and private sectors, with part of the building belonging to the city and the remainder privately owned. Gifu expanded its size in 2006 by merging with the neighboring town of Yanaizu (from Hashima District) during the great Heisei merger.

== Government ==
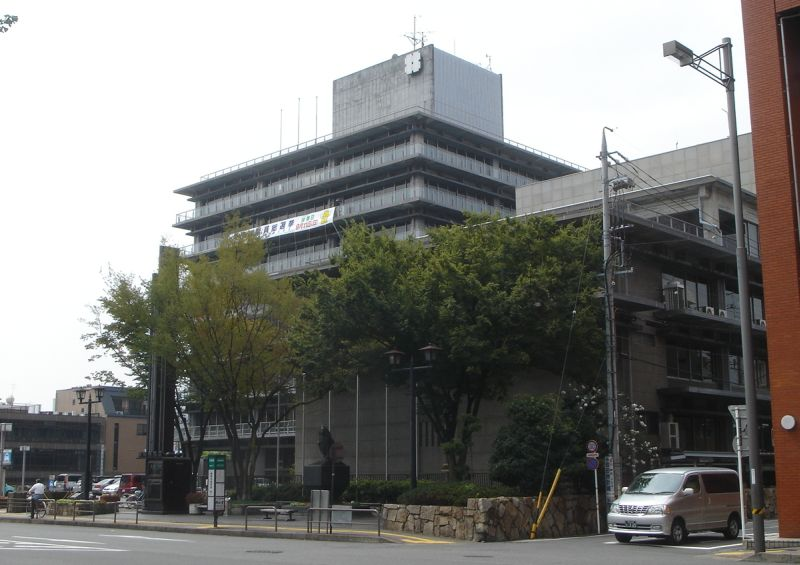
Gifu City Hall

=== Local government ===
As with all Japanese cities, Gifu has a mayor-council form of government with a directly elected mayor and a unicameral city legislature. The mayor serves a four-year term. Supporting the mayor are two vice-mayors and the city treasurer, all of whom are appointed by the mayor. The city legislature has 38 seats. No members of the city council are selected through at-large election. Like the mayor, each member of the city council serves a four-year term and all seats are up for election at the same time. The council chair and vice-chair are elected by members of the city assembly.

The city also supplies nine members of the Gifu Prefectural Assembly, who are also elected for a four-year term.

In terms of the national government, Gifu 1st district (Gifu-ken dai-ikku) is a single-member electoral district for the House of Representatives, the lower house of the National Diet. The district consists of all of Gifu, excluding the former town of Yanaizu, which falls into the Gifu 3rd District.

== External relations ==
=== Twin towns – sister cities ===
==== International ====
Gifu is twinned with:

Sister cities

- Campinas, State of São Paulo, Brazil, since 1982
- Cincinnati, Ohio, United States, since 1988
- Meidling (Vienna), Austria, since 1994
- Thunder Bay, Canada, since 2007

Friendship cities

- Florence, Italy, 1978
- Hangzhou, China, 1979

==== National ====
- (Toyama Prefecture) Toyama, Toyama, Japan, since 2007

== Economy ==
Gifu's first major industry was textiles. For a long period of time it rivaled Tokyo and Osaka as a leader of the Japanese fashion industry. The area just north of JR Gifu Station contains a variety of small clothing stores catering to many types of consumers. Furthermore, the city's main downtown covered shopping arcade, Yanagase, features many clothing, shoe, and accessory shops that carry both domestic and overseas goods. Over the past decade, though, as Gifu's fashion industry has declined steeply, the city has begun developing other industries to support the local economy.

One such industry is manufacturing. Because the city is located near Aichi Prefecture and its many major automotive and heavy industry companies, such as Toyota, Gifu has become a prosperous area for many metalworking, mold and die, and parts subcontractors. Its access to neighboring areas using public transportation and highways has allowed companies to set up many factories and facilities in the area.

In addition to the modern industries upon which Gifu's economy rests, the city also has a wide array of traditional industries, which include traditional Gifu Fans, Mino washi and foods created from the ayu sweetfish. Many shops throughout the city produce these goods. The most well-known local industries, though, are traditional Gifu Lanterns and Umbrellas. There are approximately 15 businesses that make lanterns in the city, the largest of which is the Ozeki Lantern, Co. In the Kanō area, visitors have the opportunity to take a course and make their own paper umbrellas.

== Education ==
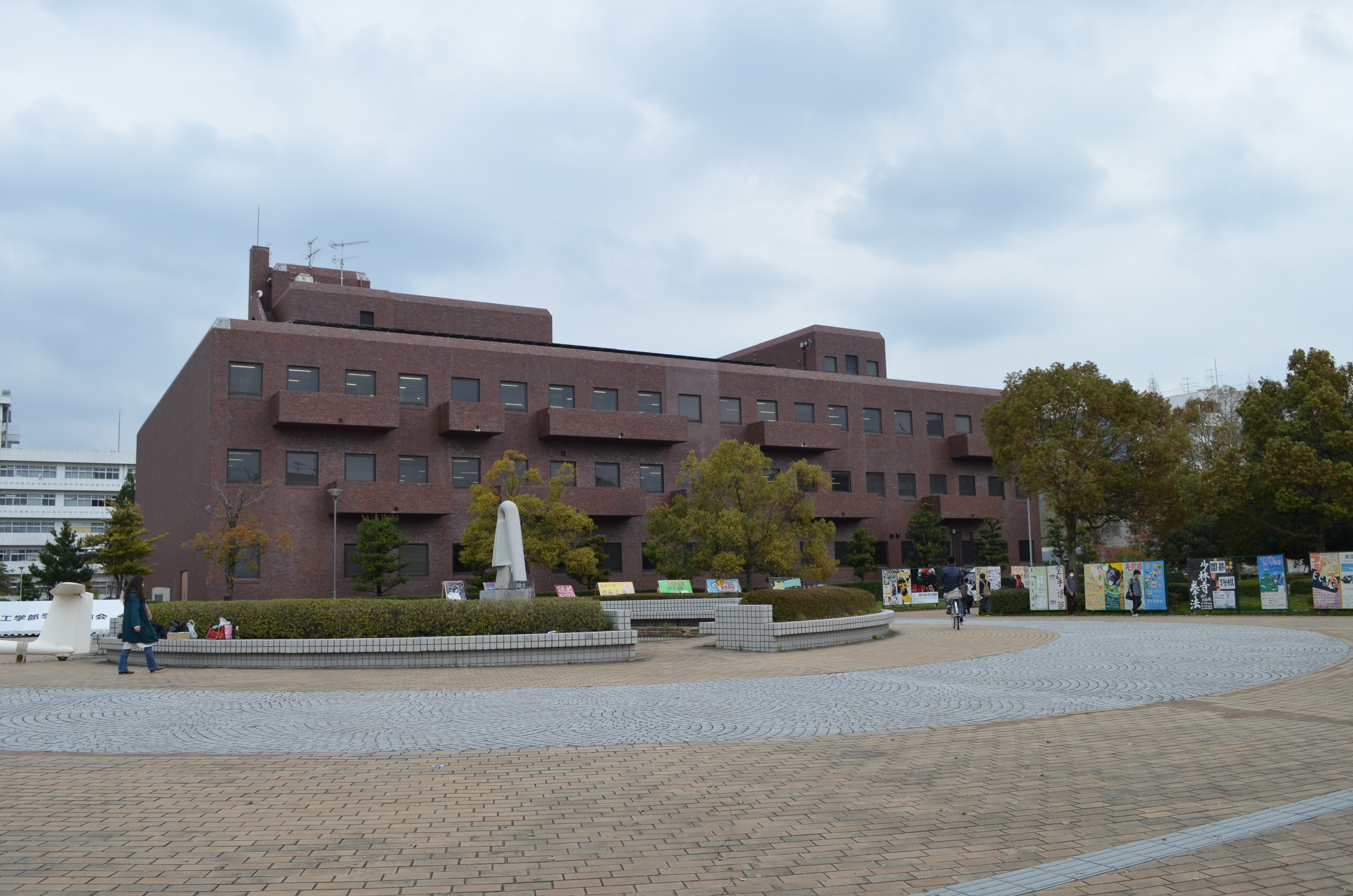
Gifu University

Gifu has 48 nursery schools and 43 kindergartens available for children. The city government operates 47 public elementary schools, and one additional public elementary school is under the aegis of the national government; there is also one private elementary school. The city also has 22 public junior high schools, with one additional public junior high school and one private junior high school. There are also three private combined junior/senior high schools. After graduating from junior high school, students have the option of attending one of Gifu's 12 public high schools operated by the Gifu Prefectural Board of Education or 5 private high schools. Gifu also has a North Korean school, the Gifu Korean Elementary and Junior High School (岐阜朝鮮初中級学校).

The city has 19 technical institutions and two public and six private colleges and universities. The largest of these is Gifu University, the city's national university, which includes a hospital. Among the private universities, Gifu Shotoku Gakuen University, located in the area of the former town of Yanaizu offers a four-year program and also has an associated junior college. Gifu Women's University, a private women's university founded in 1968 is also a four-year school. Gifu City Women's College was founded in 1946 as traditional college, but later became a city-supported, public junior college. Gifu Pharmaceutical University, founded in 1932 as the Gifu City Pharmaceutical College, remains a public university offering graduate-level courses.

=== Colleges and universities ===
- Gifu City Women's College
- Gifu Junior College of Health Science
- Gifu Pharmaceutical University
- Gifu Shotoku Gakuen University
- Gifu Shotoku Gakuen Junior College
- Gifu University
- Gifu Women's University
- Heisei College of Health Sciences

== Transportation ==
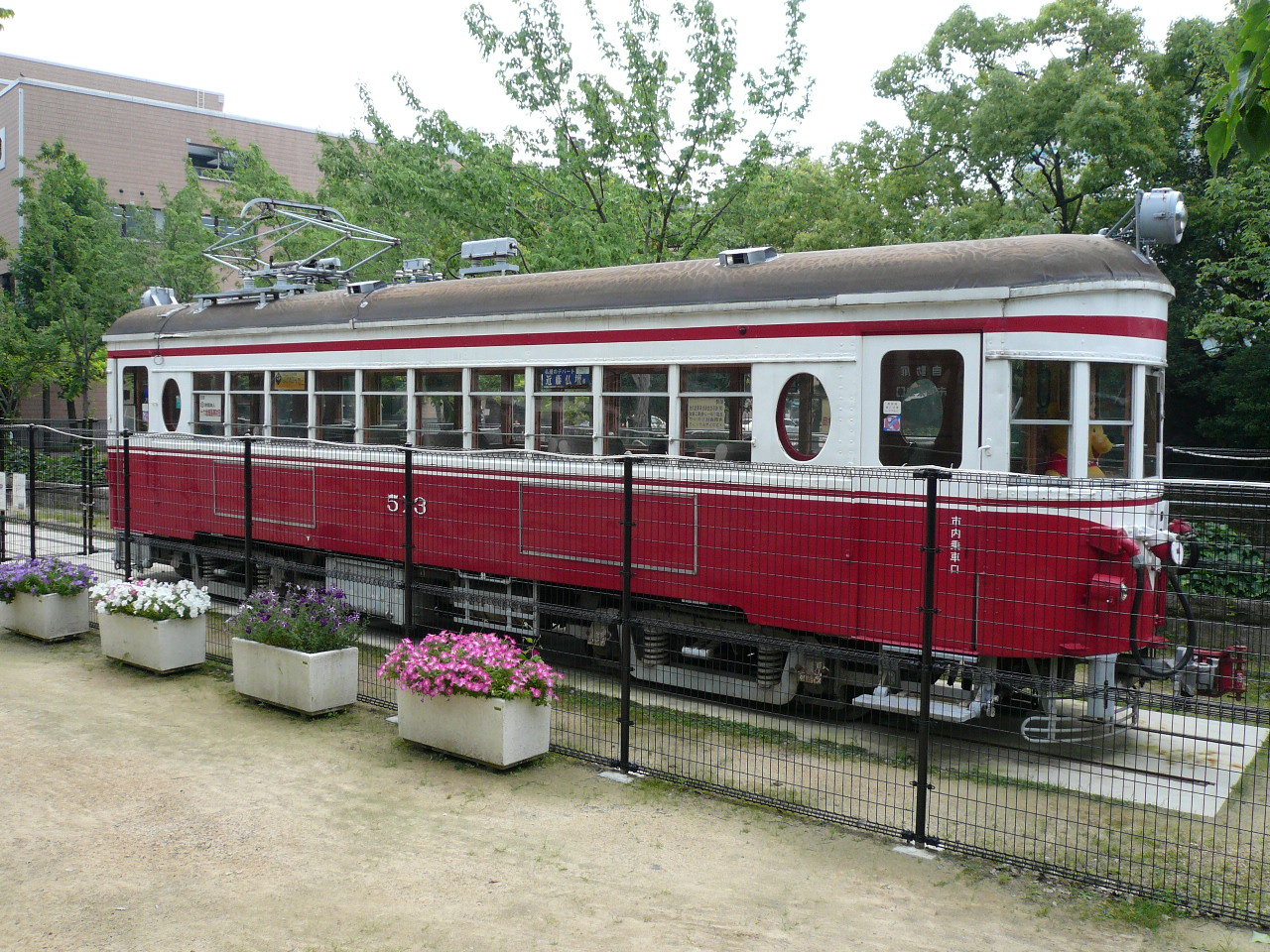
Retired Gifu streetcar

Gifu's central location and its past connection with the Nakasendō make it one of Japan's central transportation hubs. In addition to being in the center of many rail and bus lines, the city also has nine national highways running through its borders. These include the Meishin Expressway, Tōkai-Kanjō Expressway and Japan National Route 21, 22, 156, 157, 248, 256, and 303.

Two rail companies have major train stations downtown: JR Central (Central Japan Railway Company) and Meitetsu. The JR Tōkaidō Main Line runs through and the Takayama Main Line begins at JR Gifu Station. The JR Tōkaidō Shinkansen, however, does not run through Gifu Station; its nearest stops are Nagoya Station and Gifu-Hashima Station. The Meitetsu lines include the Nagoya Line, the Kakamigahara Line, and the Takehana Line, all of which originate at Meitetsu Gifu Station.

Central Japan Railway Company (JR Tōkai)

- ■Tōkaidō Main Line: - Gifu -Nishi-Gifu
- ■Takayama Main Line: - Gifu - Nagamori

Japan Freight Railway Company

- ■ Tōkaido Main Line: Gifu Freight Terminal

Meitetsu

- ■Nagoya Line: Chajo - Kanō - Meitetsu Gifu
- ■Kakamigahara Line: Meitetsu Gifu - Tagami - Hosobata - Kiridōshi - Tejikara - Takadabashi
- ■Takehana Line: Yanaizu

Until April 1, 2005, Meitetsu also operated a streetcar line that ran through Gifu.

Municipal bus service first began in Gifu in 1949. Today, Gifu Bus Co., Ltd. provides service within the city, as well as connections to other cities. Its highway buses connect the city with Gujō, Osaka, Kobe, Kyoto and Shinjuku in Tokyo. Gifu Bus also connects Nagoya with Gujō, Seki, Mino and Shirakawa-gō. In addition to inter-city bus routes, many local routes go throughout the city and neighboring areas. All bus lines pass through JR Gifu Station.

Another option for travel within Gifu is via bicycle. The city has instituted a bike rental program to increase tourism within the city. Bicycles can be rented at JR Gifu Station (second floor), Gifu City Hall (South Branch), Gifu Park (Museum of History), and the Cormorant Fishing Boat Viewing Office.

== Tourism ==
=== Cormorant fishing ===
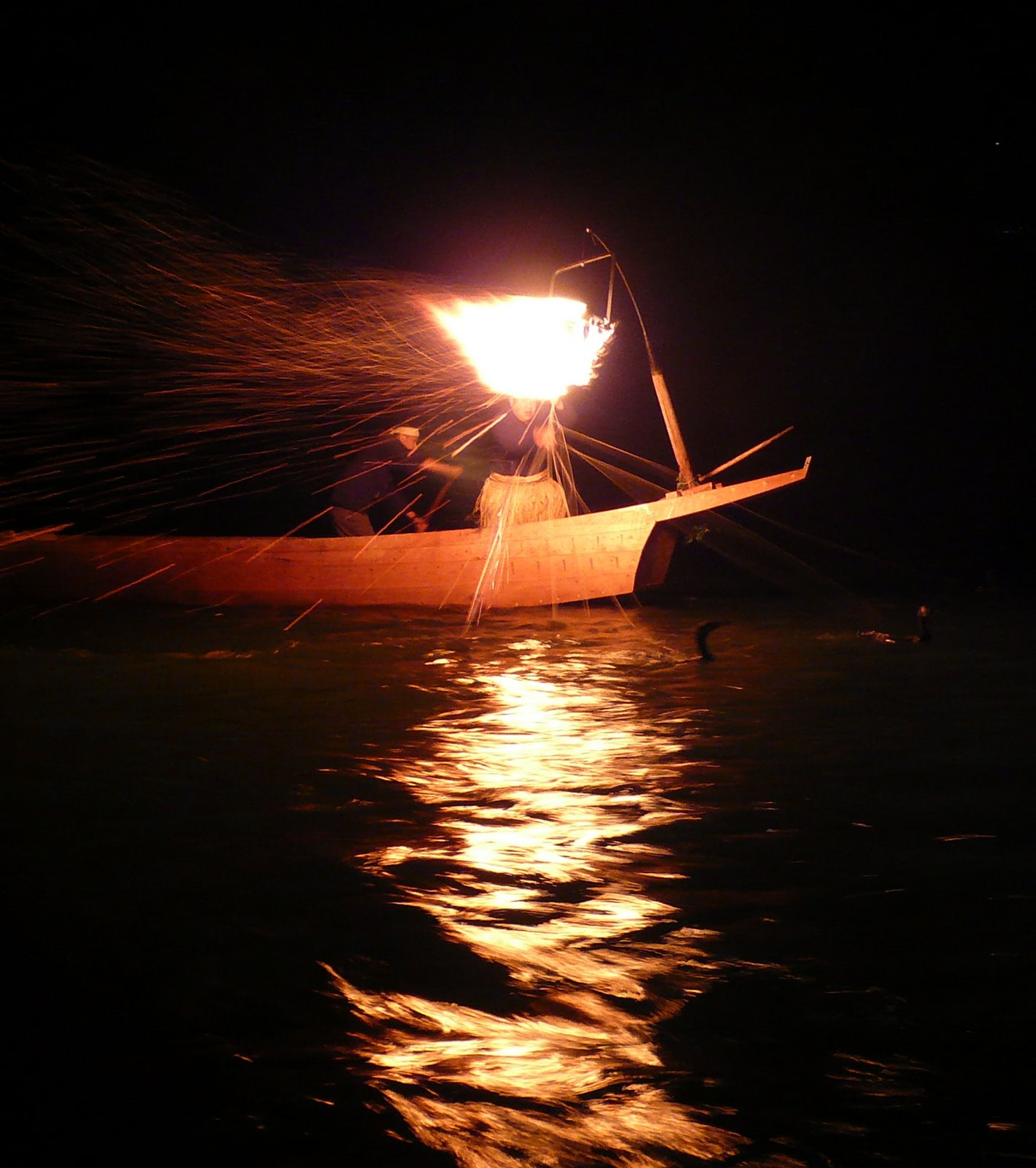
Cormorant fishing on the Nagara River

Cormorant fishing is the representative tourist attraction of Gifu. Though it occurs in many places in Japan, cormorant fishing on the Nagara River dates back more than 1,300 years. This is also the largest display of cormorant fishing in all of Japan, with six fishing masters going down the river at the same time, using their birds to catch ayu sweetfish. The season lasts from May 11 to October 15 every year and occurs each night, except during high water levels and the harvest moon.

Matsuo Bashō, a renowned haiku poet in the Edo period, spent many months in Gifu, creating haiku about many things, including cormorant fishing. Famed comedian Charlie Chaplin also came to view cormorant fishing on the Nagara River twice, reportedly moved by the experience.

=== Museums ===
The largest of the city-supported museums is the Gifu City Museum of History. It is located in Gifu Park and its permanent exhibit primarily focuses on Gifu's past, containing many hands-on exhibits. It often hosts special exhibits, though, providing a broader field of information to its visitors. Also located in Gifu Park is the Eizō & Tōichi Katō Memorial Art Museum, which is a semi-autonomous branch of the history museum. This art museum is dedicated to the works of the brothers Eizō and Tōichi Katō, famous artists born in Gifu Prefecture. The Nagara River and cormorant fishing feature prominently in a number of their pieces. The Yanaizu Folklore Museum in the Yanaizu-chō area of the city is the other branch of the Museum of History.

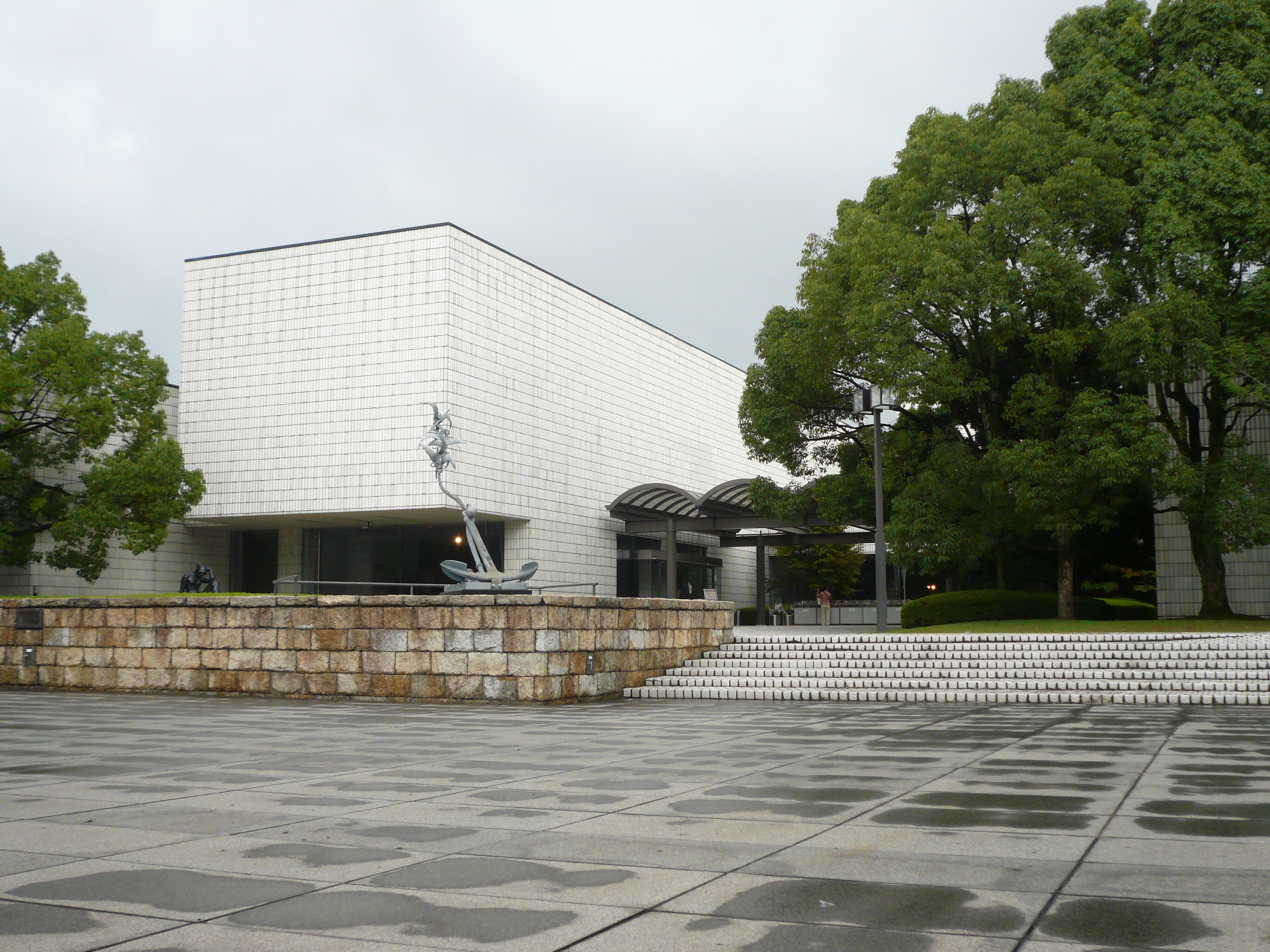
Museum of Fine Arts, Gifu

There are two other museums in Gifu Park, too. The Nawa Insect Museum, next to the history museum, and the Gifu Castle Archive Museum, next to Gifu Castle atop Mount Kinka. The Nawa Insect Museum was founded by Yasushi Nawa, Japan's "Insect Man," in 1919, and provides a closeup look at insects and their world.

Other museums include the Gifu City Science Museum and the Museum of Fine Arts, Gifu, both located near the prefectural office. In addition to the Science Museum's general exhibits, it also includes a planetarium and a rooftop observatory. The prefectural Museum of Fine Arts was opened in 1982, dedicated to art and artists related to Gifu Prefecture, though it also contains pieces from around the world. In 2006 the city instituted a policy that allows elementary and junior high school students to enter many of the city's museums free of charge.

=== Festivals and events ===
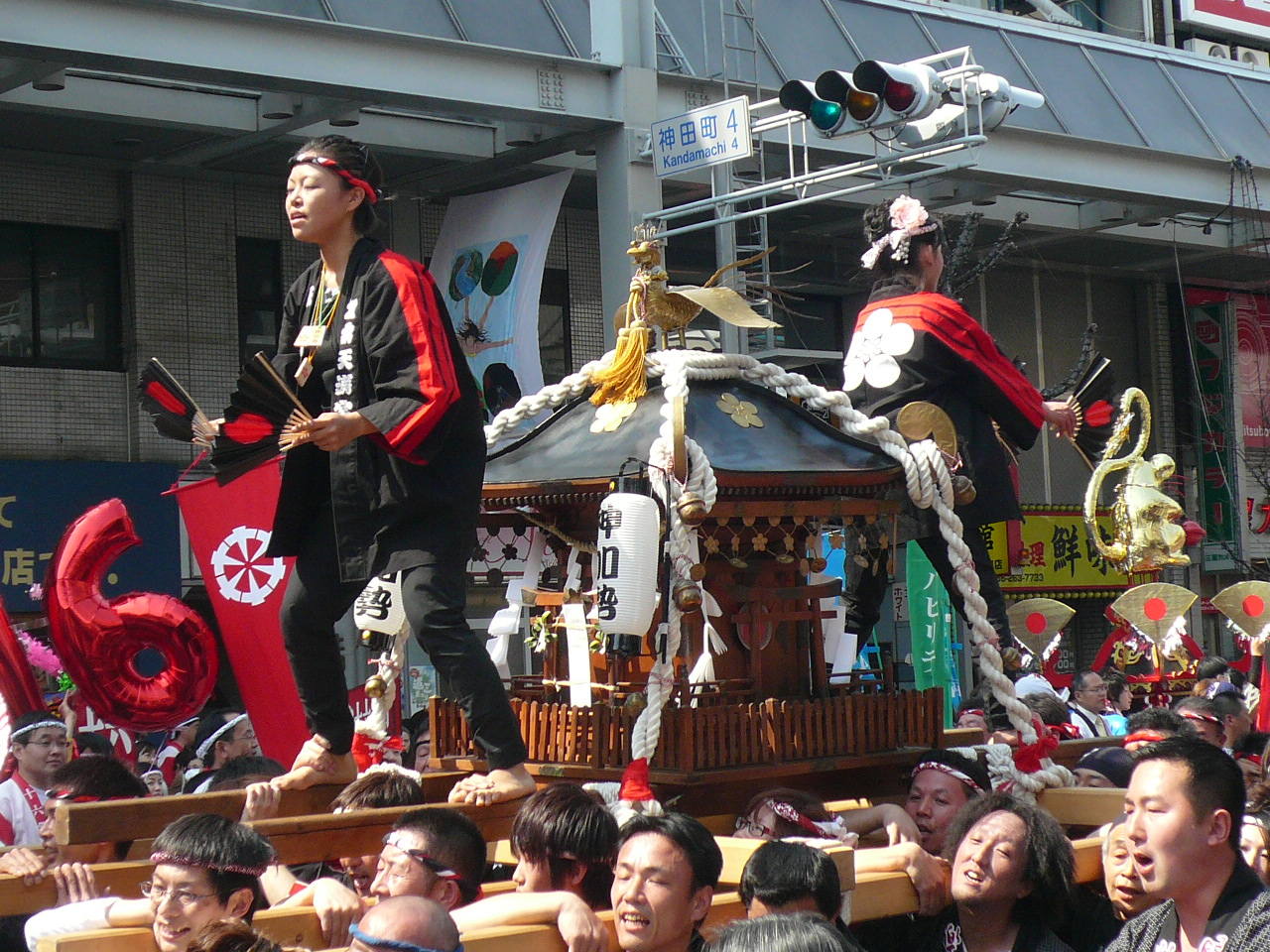
A float in the Dōsan Festival

The first major festivals of the year are the Dōsan Festival and the Gifu Festival, both of which occur on the first Saturday and following Sunday of April. Because the Dōsan Festival is a memorial to Saitō Dōsan, many of the festivities take place near Jōzai-ji, where his remains are buried. The Gifu Festival is a Shinto festival that begins at Inaba Shrine and winds its way through other shrines within the city. Both festivals include street vendors, flea markets, and floats paraded through the city. The Gifu Nobunaga Festival, which takes place on the first Saturday and following Sunday of October, also pays homage to a former lord of Gifu. This festival centers on the downtown area and includes a procession of horses and warriors down the city's main streets.

The city also has festivals representing its cultural heritage. Twice each year, there is a Tejikara Fire Festival. It first occurs on the second Saturday of April at Tejikarao Shrine and it again occurs on the second Sunday of August at Nagara River Park. Half-naked men ring bells and carry shrines and other devices that shoot off large sparks. Near the end of August, the city sponsors Takigi Noh, a traditional form of Japanese theater that takes place on the banks of the Nagara River, lit only by the surrounding bonfires and the fires of cormorant boats.

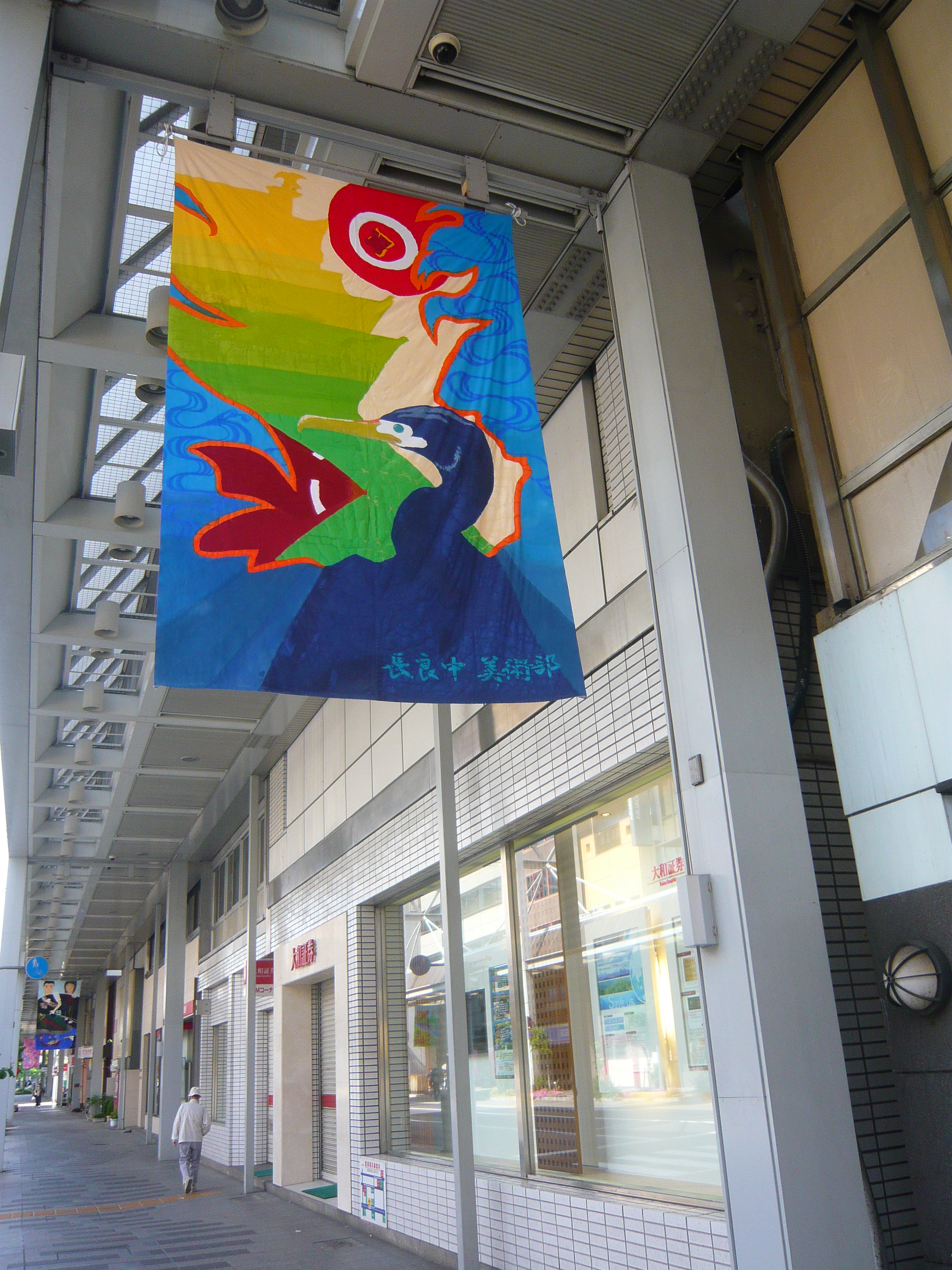
2008 Flag Art Exhibition

Twice a year, Gifu plays hosts to two large fireworks festivals. Large numbers of visitors gather on the banks of the Nagara River between Nagara and Kinka Bridge to see these festivals, among the largest in Japan. The first festival, the Chunichi Shimbun Nagara River All-Japan Fireworks Festival, occurs on the last Saturday of July. The second, the Nagara River National Fireworks Display, occurs on the first Saturday of August. Approximately 30,000 fireworks are set off at each festival, with crowds of 400,000 and 120,000 visitors, respectively.

The downtown area serves as the location for Flag Art Exhibitions a few times throughout the year. The flags displayed measure approximately 3 by 1.8 metres (9.8 by 5.9 ft). Each set of displays revolves around a different theme (such as the beauty of Gifu or AIDS Awareness) or are created by a specific group of persons (for example, local school students or local artists).

=== Athletics ===
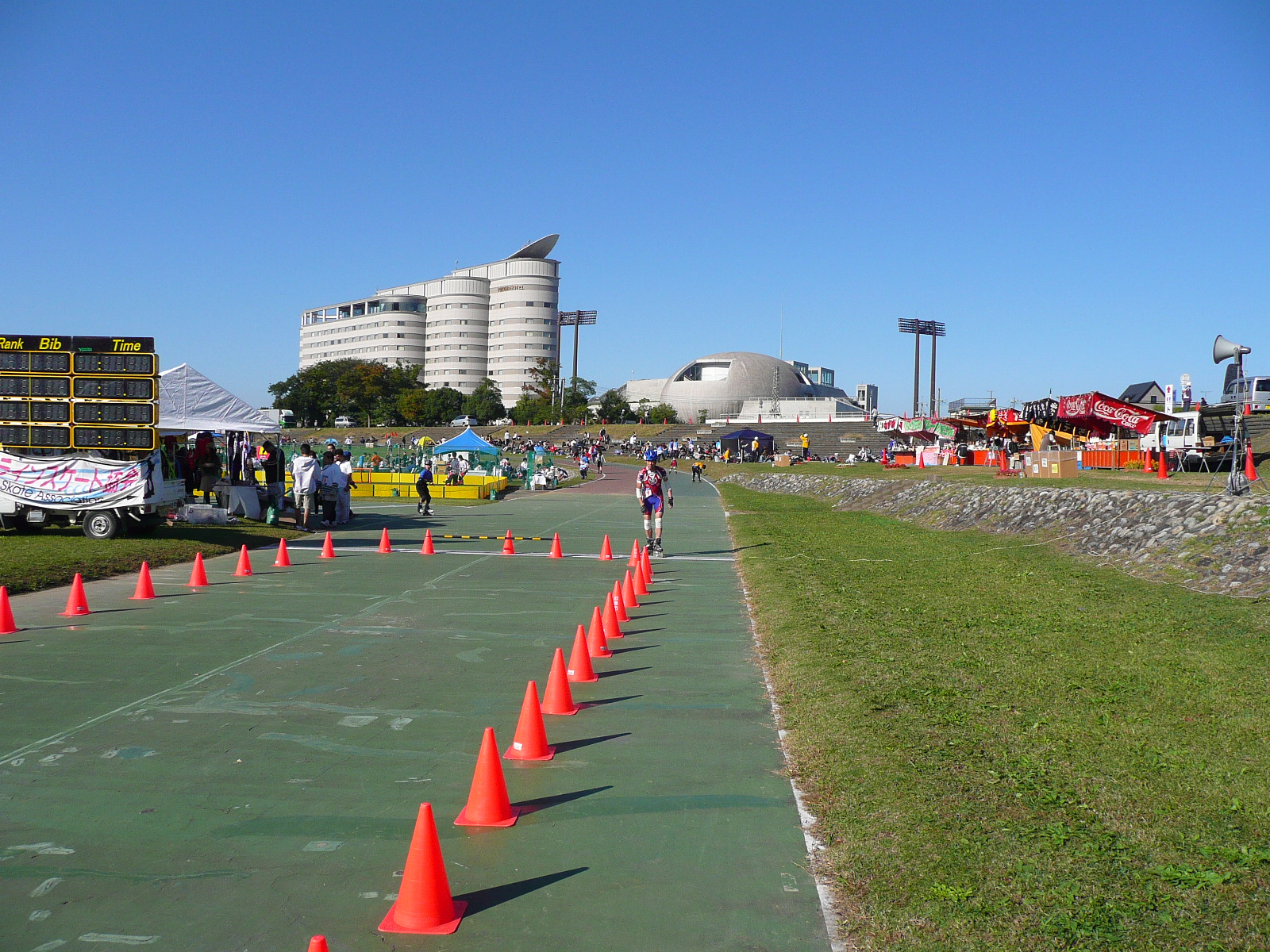
The Nagaragawa International Inline Skating Competition along the Naoko Takahashi Road

The main sporting facility in the city is the Gifu Memorial Center, whose complex includes facilities for athletic and other events. Its athletic facilities include a track and field complex, a baseball stadium, and plazas for tennis and swimming, as well as martial arts and traditional arts facilities. There are also two large multi-purpose domes: the Deai Dome (seats 5,000) and the Fureai Dome (seats 700). All of the facilities are equipped for night events. The soccer field at the Memorial Center serves as the home to FC Gifu, the city's football representative in the J-League. Next to Memorial Center is the Nagaragawa Sports Plaza, a sports science and training center. The facility accommodates up to 300 people and provides access to equipment for improving athletic ability.

Just south of these sports facilities, the Naoko Takahashi Road runs along the northern bank of the Nagara River. This pedestrian pathway is named after the Gifu-born marathoner Naoko Takahashi, who won the gold medal in the event at the 2000 Summer Olympics. This road primarily stretches from Nagara Bridge to Chusetsu Bridge, providing a convenient course for events such as the Terry Fox Run, the Nagaragawa International Inline Skating Competition, and the Gifu Seiryu Half Marathon.

=== Other attractions ===
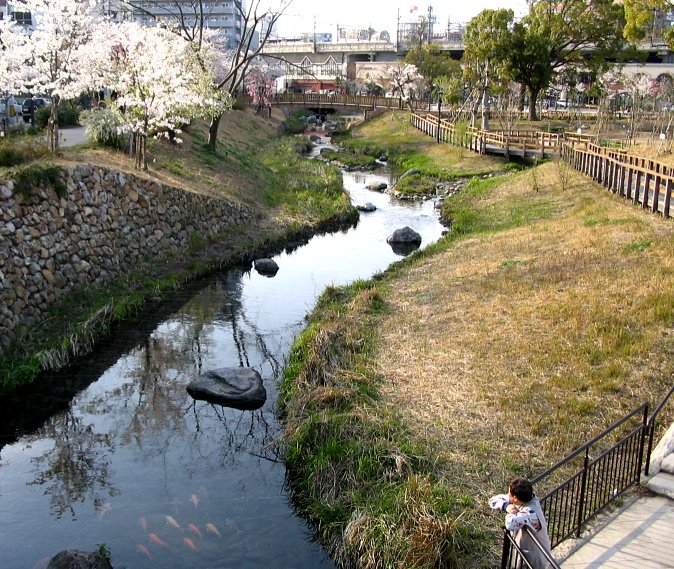
Cherry blossom in a Gifu park

Gifu Park is one of the major tourist attractions of the city because it contains many of the museums and is near many other sightseeing spots. However, it also serves as a gathering place because of its large shaded areas that include ponds, waterfalls, cherry trees and wisteria vines. Next to Gifu Park is Mount Kinka, which serves as one of the main symbols of Gifu. It rises 329 m (1,079 ft) into the sky along the banks of the Nagara River and serves as the home of Gifu Castle, as well as many hiking trails.

Other attractions include Bairin Park, filled with over fifty types of plum trees which bloom in an array of colors, from white to dark pink, each Spring. Nagaragawa Onsen is a popular indoor location. This collection of onsen and ryokan inns is located along the Nagara River in central Gifu. Its many springs have a high iron content, considered beneficial for a variety of ailments. Also, its close location to the Nagaragawa Convention Center and various high-class hotels make it a popular area for guests.

North of the Nagara River is Mount Dodo and Matsuo Pond. Mount Dodo is the tallest mountain in the city, rising 418 m (1,371 ft). In addition to its numerous hiking trails, it offers hikers views of Mount Haku and the Nagara River. At the southern base of the mountain is Matsuo Pond, which is popular during the fall when all of the foliage is changing colors.

The Yanagase covered shopping arcade was the primary shopping district of Gifu for many years, but recently that part of the downtown area has suffered a downturn in popularity as large modern shopping centers have opened in other areas. In addition to its many smaller retail shops and restaurants, Yanagase is also home to Takashimaya, Muji, and two movie theaters. It was made famous throughout the country when Kenichi Mikawa's hit, "Yanagase Blues", was released in the 1960s.

== Historical areas ==
=== Castles ===
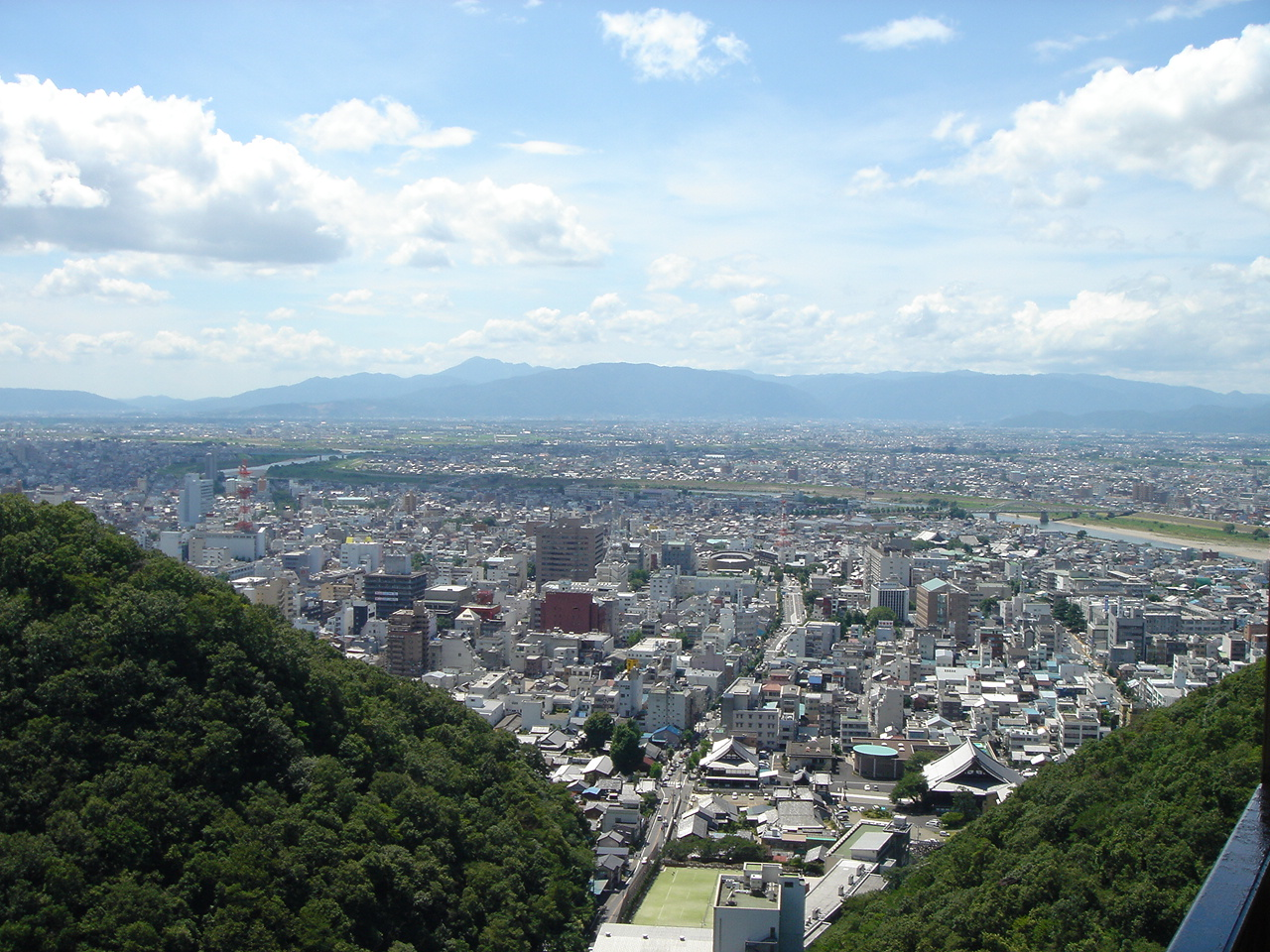
A panorama of Gifu

Gifu's most famous castle is Gifu Castle, located on Mount Kinka. First built by the Nikaidō clan during the Kamakura period, the castle has gone through many forms, with its current version rebuilt in 1956. One of its first residents was Saitō Dōsan, who lived in the castle when it was still called Inabayama Castle. The next resident, Oda Nobunaga, changed the castle's name at the same time that he changed the name of the surrounding town. From the top of the castle, visitors have a 360-degree view, effectively giving them a view to all of the city's borders. Inside the castle are many artifacts from its past.

Though the two other castles in the city, Kanō Castle and Kawate Castle, only have ruins marking their former presence, they have both had important roles in the city's past. Kanō Castle was built shortly after the Battle of Sekigahara when Tokugawa Ieyasu ordered the Toyotomi family to build it upon the ruins of a former medieval castle. Okudaira Nobumasa was the first person to live in the castle and he was followed by his descendants until the Meiji period. The castle's citadel ruins are designated a National Historic Site. Kawate Castle was used by the Toki clan while they were guarding Owari, Ise and Mino provinces as the Chief Retainer of the shogunate during the Muromachi period. It was also used as a meeting place for the cultural and social elite from Kyoto. A stone monument near Seibi High School marks the castle's location.

=== Major shrines ===
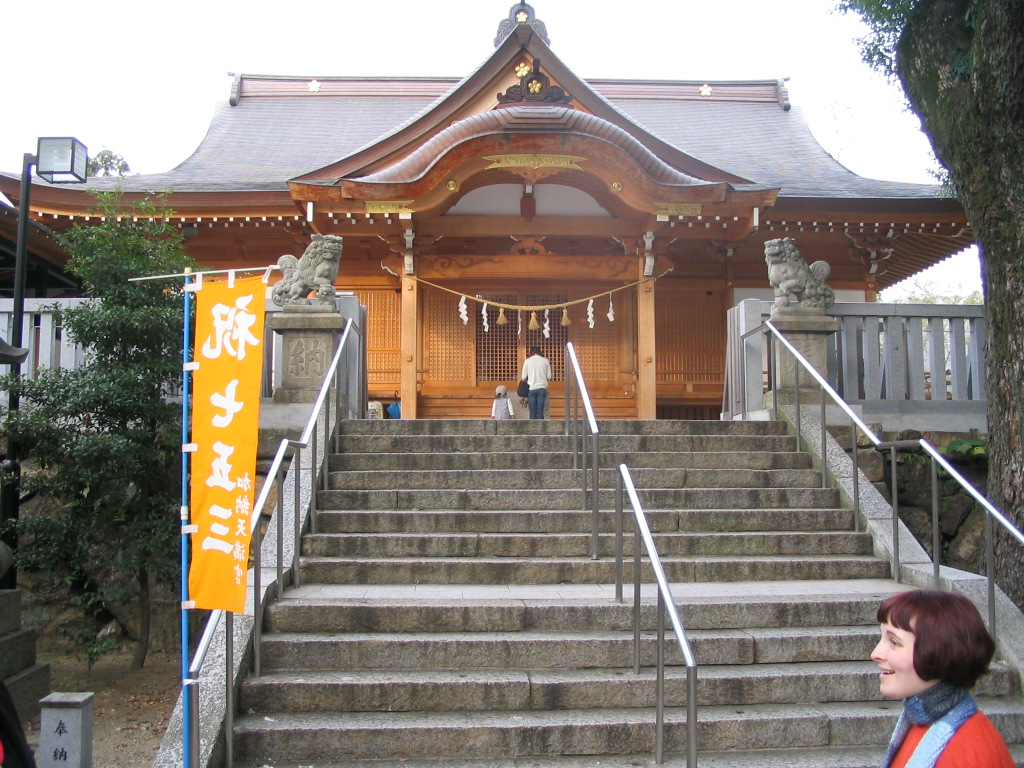
Kanō Tenman-gū

The most famous shrines in the city include Inaba Shrine, Kogane Shrine, and Kashimori Shrine. They are considered a family of shrines because the Inishiki Irihiko-no-mikoto god at Inaba Shrine is married to the Nunoshi Hime-mikoto goddess at Kogane Shrine; together, they are the parents of the Ichihaya-no-mikoto God at Kashimori Shrine. Inaba Shrine was originally located on the northern side of Mount Kinka, but was moved to its present location by Saitō Dōsan during his reign over Gifu. Kogane Shrine is located in Kogane Park, behind the Gifu City Culture Center, and a popular legend says that, behind Kashimori Shrine, you can see the footprints of Tenba, a mythical horse.

Kanō Tenman-gū, a shrine located in the former Kanō-juku, was built in concurrence with Kanō Castle shortly after the Battle of Sekigahara. Originally built to serve as a place of worship for the castle's residents, it eventually became a place of prayer for many people within the growing town. Tejikarao Shrine, located in the eastern portion of the city, is famous as the home of the April Tejikara Fire Festival. The city is also home to seven of the Mino Thirty-three Kannon.

=== Major temples ===
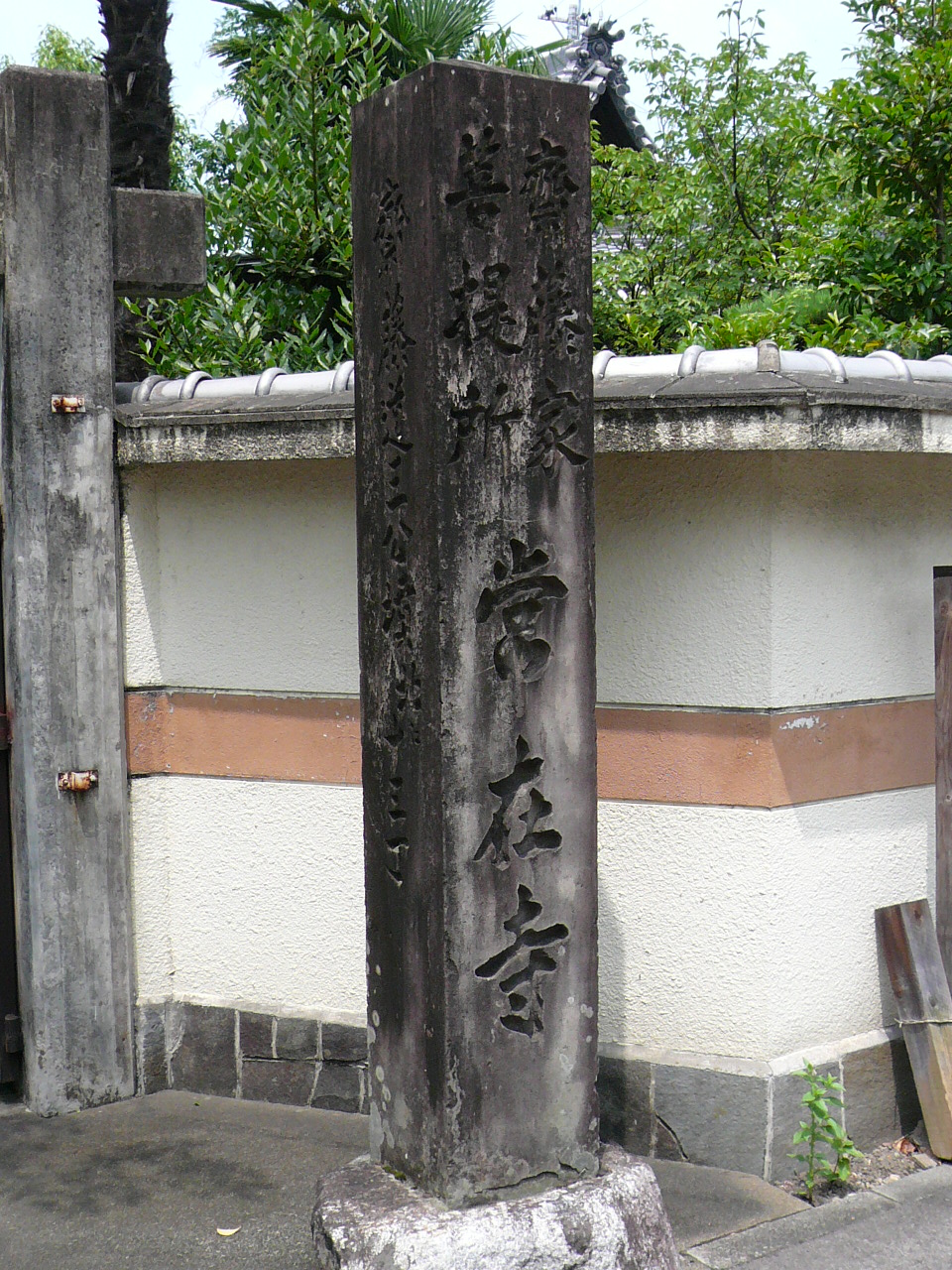
Entrance to Jōzai-ji

Because of the importance of both Saitō Dōsan and Oda Nobunaga, many of Gifu's temples hold strong connections to them. Jōzai-ji, for instance, was built by Saitō Myōchin, an ancestor of Dōsan, under the protection of Toki Shigeyori. Dōsan took advantage of this temple's support as he began his domination of Mino Province. His presence was so strong that his death was mourned at the temple for three generations, and his remains are now interred there. Zuiryō-ji was also built by Myōchin and is currently undergoing restoration. It contains the tombs of Shigeyori, Myōchin, and Gokei Kokushi. Sōfuku-ji contains the "Blood Ceiling"; it was stained with the blood of the vassals of Oda Nobunaga's grandson, Oda Hidenobu, who committed seppuku during the Battle of Sekigahara after their leader's defeat. This temple contains the mausoleums of both Nobunaga and his son, Oda Nobutada.

Shōhō-ji is home to the Gifu Great Buddha, which is also referred to as the "Blessed Buddha". Built during the Edo period, it was the first and largest dry-lacquered Buddha in Japan, and remains one of the three largest Great Buddha Images of Japan. The Buddha and its 13.7-meter (45-foot) bamboo frame took 38 years to build. The nearby garden offers tea and traditional foods.

Jōdo-ji holds the remains of Hanako, Rodin's only Japanese model, who traveled extensively throughout Europe during her career. A statue of Hanako was erected at the temple in 2004. Hanako spent most of her later years in Gifu's Nishizono-chō, just east of Yanagase.

== Culture ==
=== Lifestyle ===
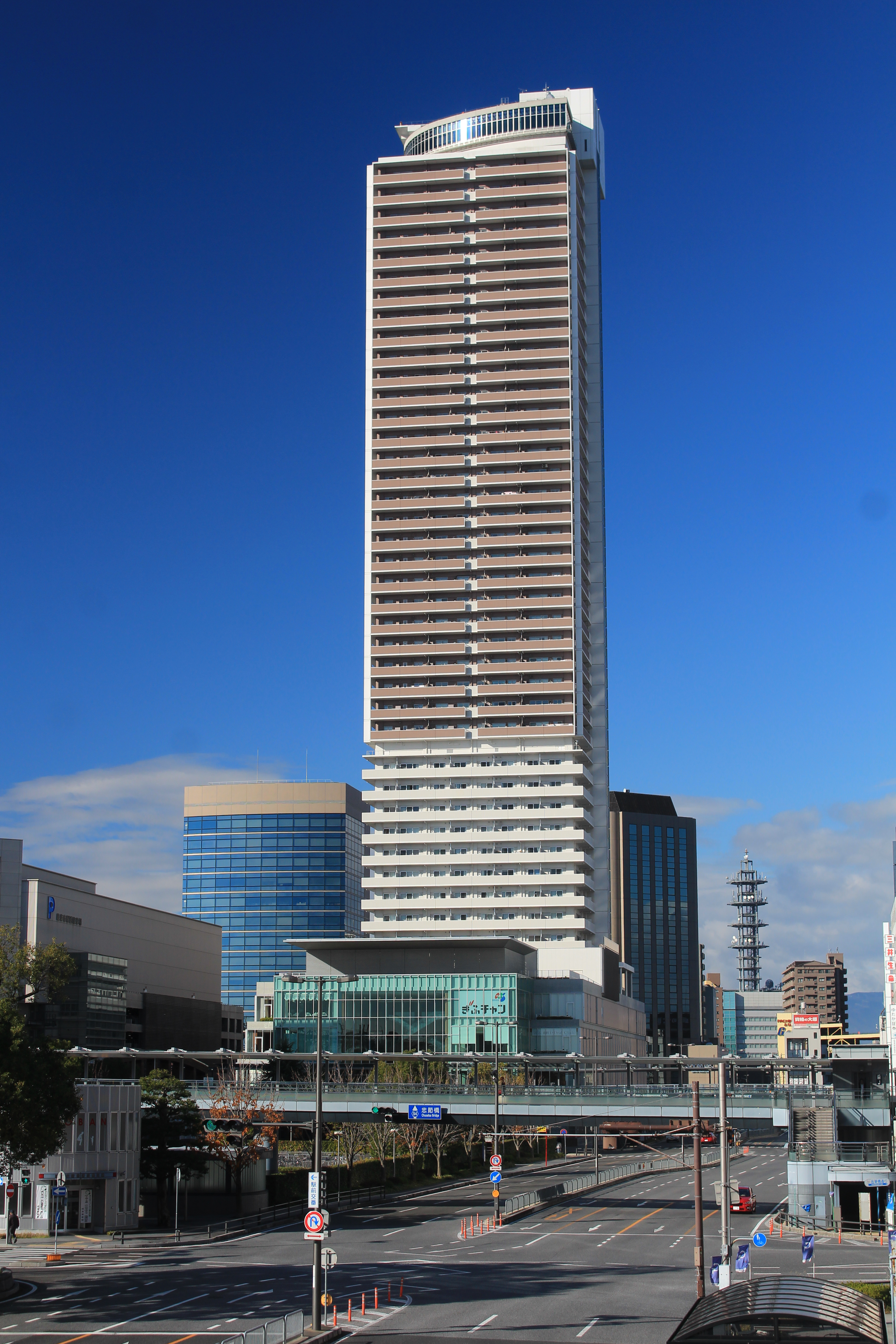
Gifu City Tower 43

The central area of the city serves as a satellite of nearby Nagoya, which has large offices of many international companies, including Toyota. The ease of commute between the two cities, as well as the plentiful apartment construction underway, has contributed to this distinction. Just west of Gifu Station is Gifu City Tower 43, a 43-story high-rise building developed by Takenaka Corporation that opened on October 13, 2007 as the tallest building in Gifu Prefecture. The upper 30 floors are divided into two- and three-bedroom apartments, including those for senior citizens. The lower floors will be used as offices or shops for targeted services such as medical care. Additionally, public space exists at the top of the building, allowing residents another 360-degree view of Gifu, complementing that offered from Gifu Castle.

The city of Gifu is currently promoting the Slow Life City Initiative, which is similar to, but more comprehensive than, the slow food initiative. It is designed to encourage residents to lead slower lifestyles and provide an alternative to the fast-paced life of the modern world. Major elements of this campaign include more dependence on locally grown food; traditional culture and arts; and activities to increase citizens’ participation in their community. In addition to slow food, Gifu also hopes to include slow industry (traditional crafts), slow education (studying quality of life), and slow tourism (represented by cormorant fishing).

== Notable people from Gifu ==
=== Politicians ===
- Yasuhiko Funago
- Hajime Furuta
- Iwao Matsuda
- Yoji Muto
- Seiko Noda
- Yasuhiro Sonoda
- Atsuko Wakai

=== Culture and arts ===
- Chitose Abe - fashion designer
- Haruka Aizawa - manga artist
- Junji Ito - manga artist
- Eizō Katō - painter
- Tōichi Katō - painter
- Nobuo Kojima - writer
- Seijirō Kōyama - film director
- Makoto Raiku - manga artist
- Aki Shimazaki - writer (moved to Canada in 1981)
- Masahiro Shinoda - film director
- Morita Sōhei - novelist
- Masamitsu Tsuchida - Go player
- Kansai Yamamoto - fashion designer

=== Entertainment ===
- Gō Ayano - actor
- Yu Hasebe - actress
- Miona Hori - idol, Nogizaka46
- Hideaki Itō - actor
- Yoko Kumada - gravure idol
- Lisa (Japanese musician, born 1987) - singer
- Mina - voice actress
- Nana Okada - singer
- Reina Sumi - announcer
- Shinnosuke Tachibana - voice actor
- Minase Yashiro - gravure idol

=== Athletes ===
- Sayaka Aoki - track and field
- Takahiro Aoki - former baseball player
- Yuko Arai - fencer
- Kenta Asakura - former baseball player
- Shinji Iwata - former baseball player
- Masaaki Mori - former baseball player and manager
- Yasuyuki Moriyama - former football player
- Tomoko Okuda - professional boxer
- Toru Suzuki - golfer
- Morimichi Takagi - former baseball player
- Jumpei Takahashi - baseball player, Fukuoka SoftBank Hawks
- Naoko Takahashi - long-distance runner
- Hiroshi Tanahashi - wrestler
- Tsuyoshi Tezuka - drifting driver
- Kazuhiro Wada - former baseball player
- Naofumi Yamamoto - former professional wrestler, better known by his ring name Yoshi Tatsu
- Kokomo Murase - Professional snowboarder

=== Others ===
- Kenkichi Kagami - entrepreneur
- Takeyoshi Kawashima - jurist
- Hirosi Ooguri - physicist

== See also ==
- Nagara Tenjin Shrine
- Uguisudani Junior and Senior High School
- Gifu City Chuo Library
