= Uguisudani Junior and Senior High School =

Coordinates: 35°25′27.3″N 136°46′1.9″E

Uguisudani Junior & Senior High School 鶯谷中学・高等学校
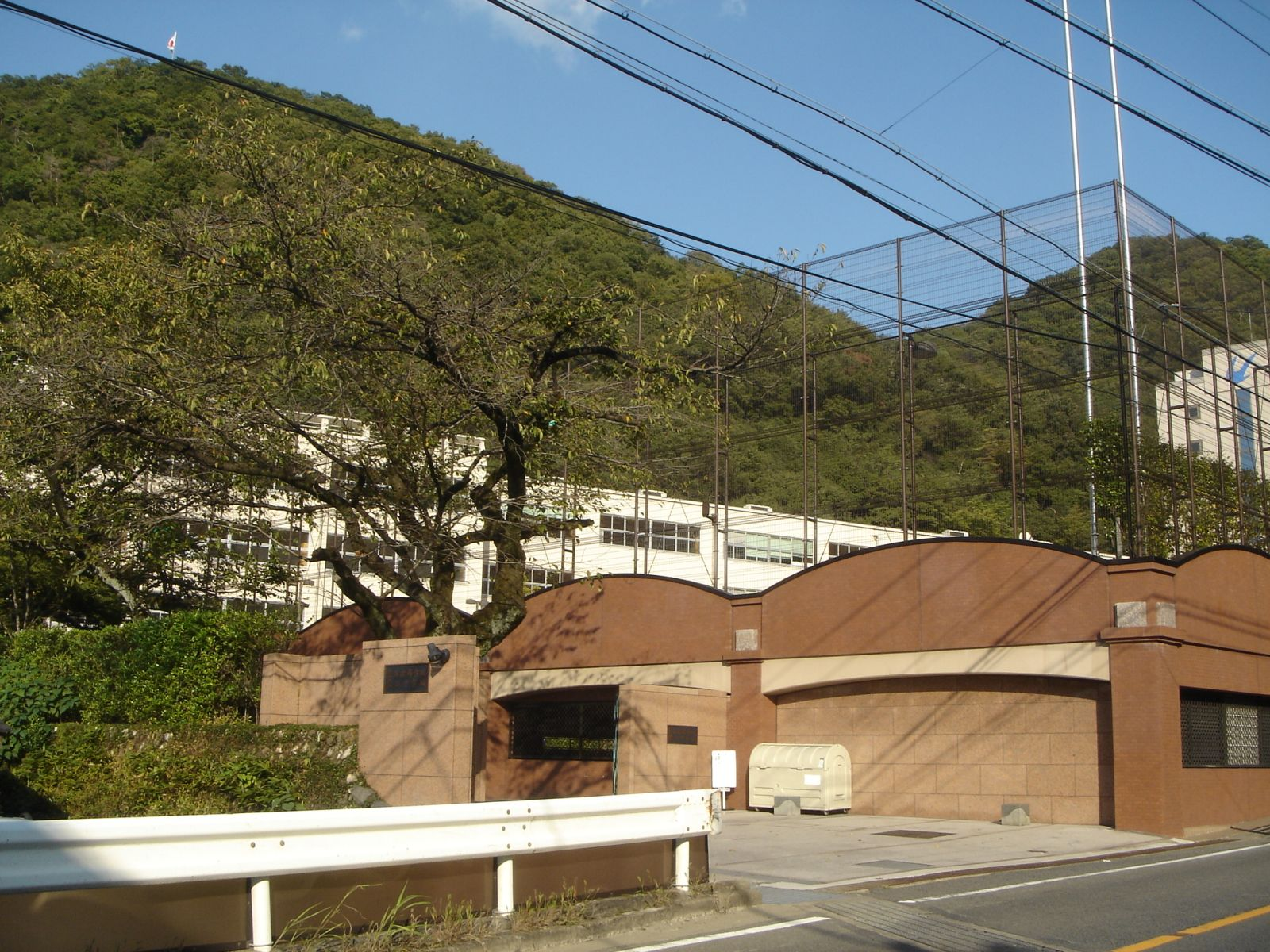

Location
- Gifu, Gifu Prefecture, Japan

Information
- Type: Private
- Established: 1903
- Headmaster: Hitoshi Nagase (長瀬仁)

Uguisudani Junior and Senior High School (鶯谷中学・高等学校, Uguisudani Chūgaku・Kōtō Gakkō) is the private, college-preparatory school located in Gifu, Gifu Prefecture, Japan.

== History ==
- 1903 - Ryoichi Suzuki established "Sasaki girls' school for sewing" in Nishino-machi, Gifu city.
- 1908 - It was transferred to Sakuma-cho within the city.
- 1913 - It was renamed "Sasaki girls' school for practical studies"
- 1926 - It was retransferred to the present site, Uguisudani-cho.
- 1948 - It was renamed "Uguisudani girls' high school"
- 1990 - It was changed to coeducational school and renamed "Uguisudani high school"
- 1996 - The junior high was established and the system of 6-year secondary education was started.

== Uguisudani junior high ==
In 1996, Uguisudani Jr. high was established in order to start six-year secondary education system and to rise the percentage of Uguisudani high's students who go to first-class universities.

== Uguisudani senior high ==
In 1990, Uguisudani girls' high school adopted a coeducational system and was restarted as "Uguisudani Highschool"
