= Gifu Junior College of Health Science =

Private junior college in Gifu, Gifu, Japan

Coordinates: 35°23′3.3″N 136°44′23.9″E

- 岐阜保健短期大学
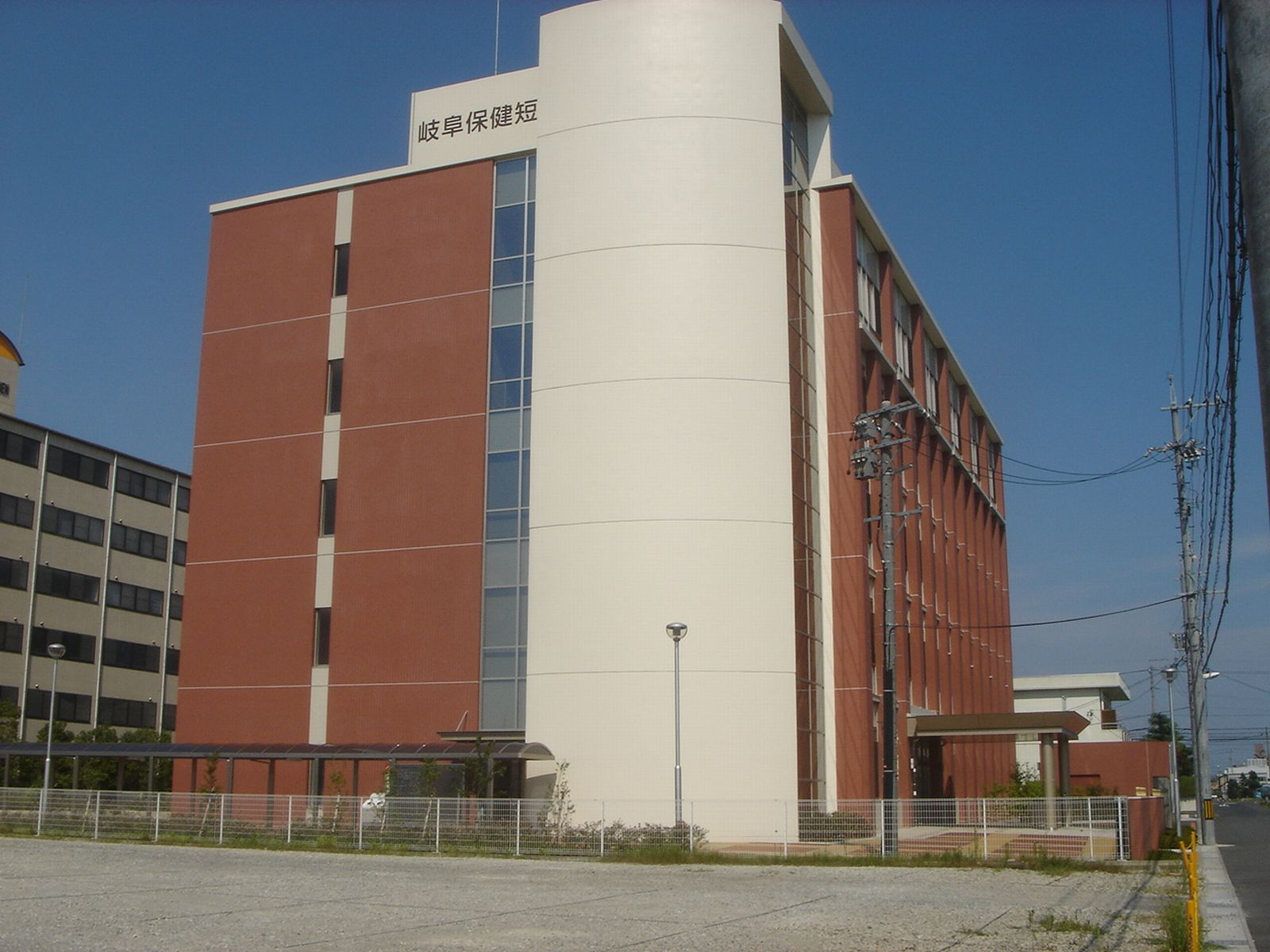
- Gifu Junior College of Health Science
- Type: Private
- Location: Gifu, Gifu, Japan
- Website: www.gifuhoken.ac.jp

Gifu Junior College of Health Science (岐阜保健短期大学, Gifu hoken tanki daigaku) is a private junior college in Gifu, Gifu, Japan, established in 2007. The predecessor of the school was founded in 1978.
