= Gifu City Chuo Library =

Municipal library in Gifu Prefecture of Japan

- 岐阜市立中央図書館
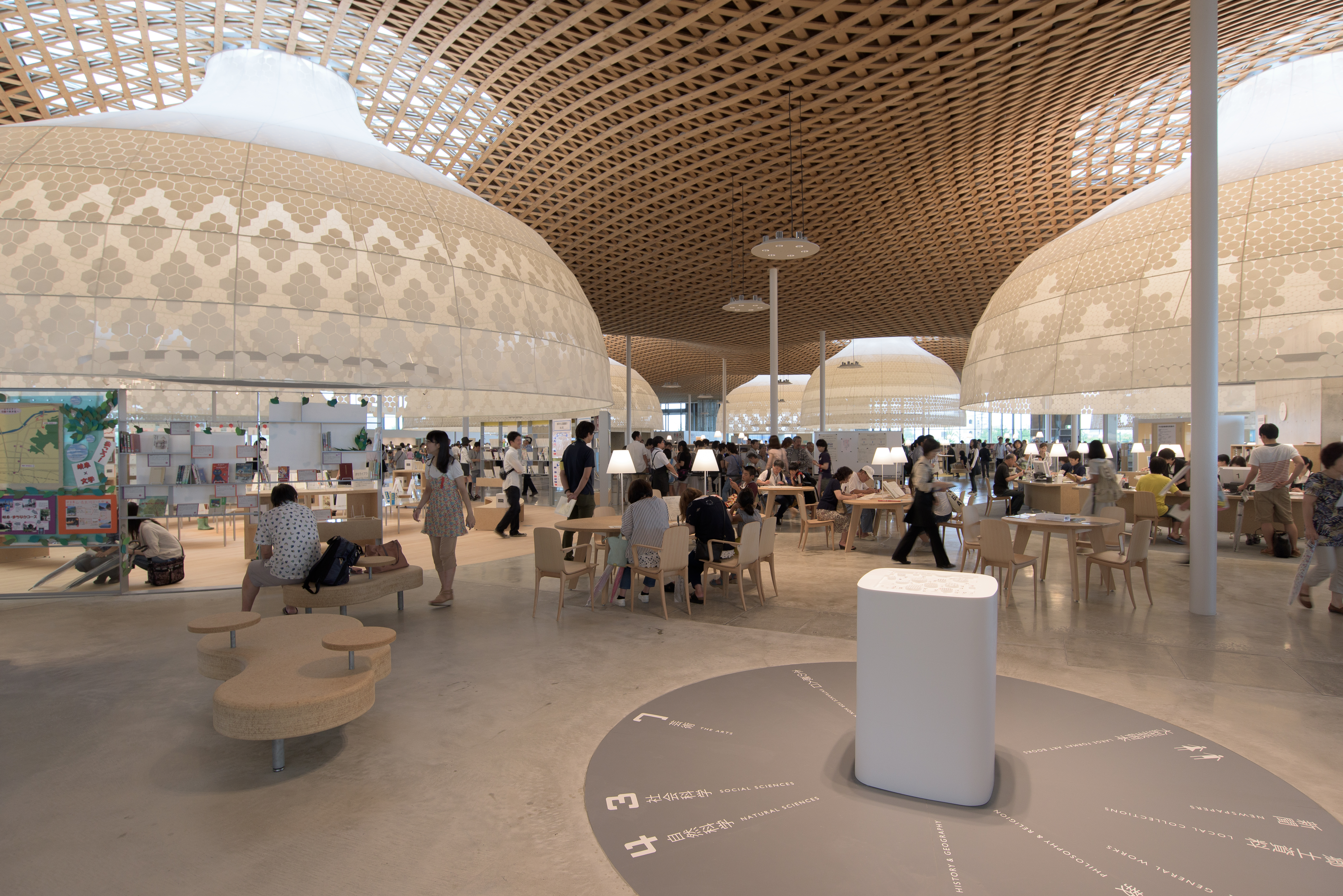

General information
- Location: 40-5 Tsukasamachi, Gifu City, 500-8076, Gifu, Gifu Prefecture 500-8076, Japan

Design and construction
- Architect: Toyo Ito

The Gifu City Chuo Library (岐阜市立中央図書館) is the main public library in Gifu, Gifu Prefecture, Japan. The current building was opened in 2015, replacing one that served the city from 1958 onwards. The Library has over 70 librarians on staff. Since the new building opened, the number of annual visitors has increased ten times; the library draws up to three times the city's population with 1.35 million annual visitors (before the renewal, it would see about 150,000 visitors a year). It has become a popular visiting spot for young families; NHK notes that the number of patrons aged 40 or younger has increase by 22 since it opened. Over 100 new libraries have been built across the country using subsidies from the Infrastructure Ministry, pushing the “compact city” idea. Financing for the new type of library in Gifu, was also helped by a subsidy from local government that encouraged the construction of a library combined with a community center and other spaces for public use. Since the turn of the century, there is a trend with new libraries in Japan that evolve to meet the needs of the local users; “problem solving libraries” that are helping people in the local area. Each new library is tailored to the needs of the area; more than a quiet place with books, they've evolved into community hubs offering a multitude of programming. Gifu caters to young families while also serving more senior users.

== Building description ==
The building is part of a larger complex, the Gifu Media Cosmos, a multi-purpose cultural facility. The library is located on the second floor of the complex. A distinctive feature of the entrance area is a large umbrella-shaped dome, which can be seen as you take the escalator up to the entrance. In total, 11 of these domes are hung from the ceiling. The largest is 14 meters across. Each dome serves to divide the library into sections, such as literature or young adults. With some exceptions, a seating area is located beneath each of the domes. Low bookshelves are arranged radially from the reading seats, as there are no walls in the building. This allows patrons to get a full view of the building.

The ceiling inside the building features layers of wooden lattices, made from local Tono cypress, “forming curves reminiscent of mountain ranges”. The smell of cypress is noticeable throughout the library. Large amounts of natural light enter through the umbrella-shaped domes. On the roof, skylights open and close, allowing for air circulation. The inside is reminiscent of a Japanese home. The building was designed by Japanese architect Toyo Ito.

== Offerings ==
The library is designed to bring people together; the lack of interior walls encourages people to talk to one another. Speaking with NHK World, Nobuo Yoshinari, former director of the library stated: “That openness encourages people to walk around and explore. That's always been my vision for this library.” The library fills up with young families during the day and on weekends, to the delight of some older patrons. Nobuo also explained: “Libraries used to be all about the rules, the things you could not do.” For example, mothers with little children would worry their child would start crying and they would have to leave to take them outside until they stopped. Nobuo didn't think that should be the way, so he proposed to make the library an inclusive place where people of all generations are welcome. The study areas in the library have proven very popular during exam time; students are often unable to find a spot, with up to three to four hundred people queued at the entrance before the library opens. There is a continued rush even after opening and throughout the day. Hoping to solve the problem, starting in October 2025 the library introduced “reserved seating” via an online booking system, hoping to ease some of the congestion. The reservations are limited to Saturdays, Sundays, and holidays, offering 225 seats that can be booked online, for a period of up to three hours, 7 days in advance.

Another popular feature is a book exchange, where people can bring in a book they've read and give it to someone else, but they must speak to that person before giving them the book. The library also has a bulletin board posted by the entrance where children can leave a note for the librarians about anything that bothers them, and the librarians will respond. The programming at the library earned it the 2022 Grand Prize at the "Library of the Year" awards in Japan, in recognition of the “cutting-edge” cultural activities offered.
