= Heisei College of Health Sciences =

Coordinates: 35°27′32.3″N 136°43′35.2″E

- 平成医療短期大学; Heisei Iryō Tanki Daigaku
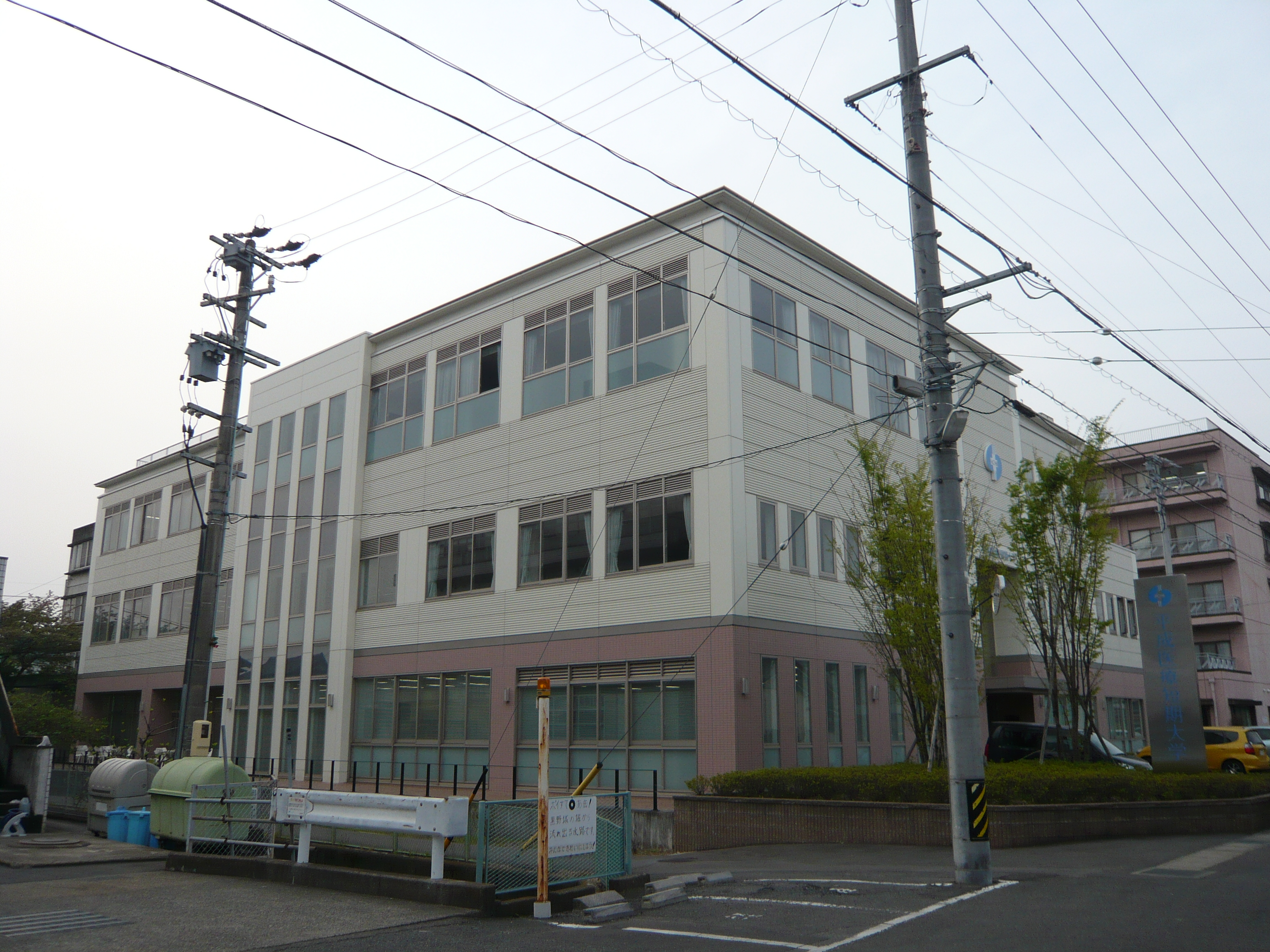
- Type: Private
- Established: 2009
- Location: Gifu, Gifu, Japan
- Website: Official website

Heisei College of Health Sciences (平成医療短期大学, Heisei Iryō Tanki Daigaku) is a private junior college in the city of Gifu, Gifu, Japan.

== History ==
It was set up as a vocational school in 1984. The Junior college was established in 2009. It is coeducational.

== Academic departments ==
- Nursing
- Rehabilitation
