= Takeyoshi Kawashima =

Japanese jurist and legal sociologist

Takeyoshi Kawashima (川島 武宜, Kawashima Takeyoshi, 17 October 1909 – 21 May 1992) was a Japanese jurist. He was a prominent representative of post-war liberalism in Japan and the country's leading legal sociologist.

Serving as Sakae Wagatsuma's assistant after 1932, Kawashima was appointed professor of civil law at the University of Tokyo in 1934. In his writings, he sought to develop a system of modern, Western, capitalist society based on the principle of the exchange of goods, which he contrasted to Japanese society with its remaining pre-modern and feudalist elements.

His criticism of Japanese domestic ideology in The familial structure of Japanese society (日本社會の家族的構成, Nihon shakai no kazokuteki kōsei) (1954) was a popular success. As a collaborator on the post-war reform of Japanese family law, Kawashima was unable to realize his ambitious ideas, but served as a counterweight to conservatives including Eiichi Makino.

In his 1963 article "Dispute Resolution in Contemporary Japan", he argued that although litigation is not a preferred method of dispute resolution anywhere, the Japanese have a particular cultural aversion to litigation. The article has sparked heated debate, generating various perspectives, notably John Haley's "The Myth of the Reluctant Litigant" and Mark Ramseyer's "Reluctant Litigant Revisited".
