= Gifu Castle =

Historic site Gifu Prefecture, Japan

- 岐阜城
- Gifu, Gifu Prefecture, Japan
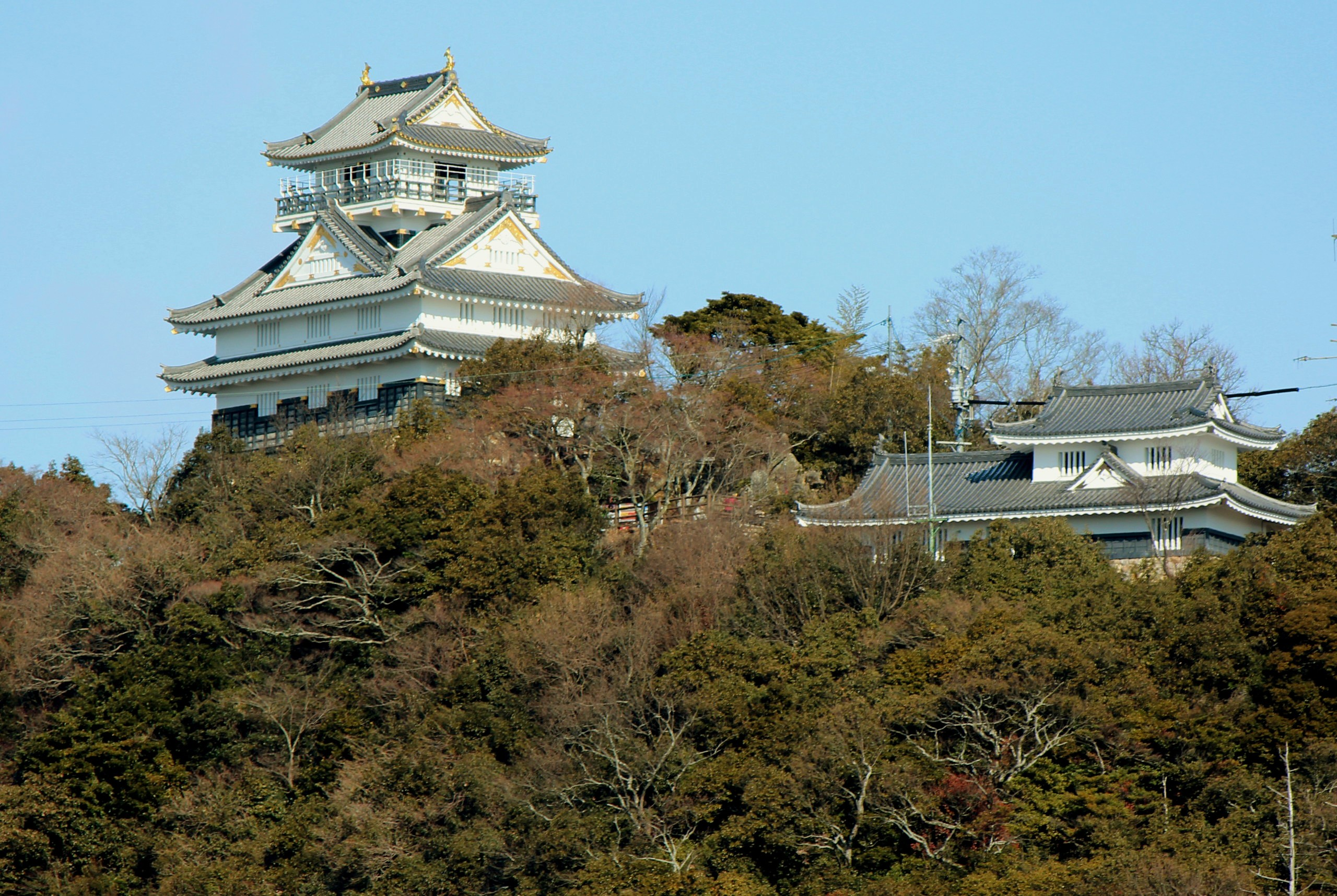
- Gifu Castle main keep

Site information
- Type: Mountaintop castle
- Condition: Reconstruction

Location
- Gifu Castle
- Location within Gifu Prefecture Location within Japan
- Coordinates: 35°26′02″N 136°46′56″E

Site history
- Built: 1201
- Built by: Nikaidō clan
- In use: 12th–16th centuries
- Materials: unknown (original) reinforced concrete (current)
- Demolished: 1600

Garrison information
- Past commanders: Oda Nobunaga
- Occupants: Saitō clan, Oda clan

Gifu Castle (岐阜城, Gifu-jō) is a Japanese castle located in the city of Gifu, Gifu Prefecture, Japan. Along with Mount Kinka and the Nagara River, it is one of the main symbols of the city. The castle is also known as Inabayama Castle (稲葉山城, Inabayama-jō). It was designated a National Historic Site in 2011.

== Overview ==
Gifu Castle is located on Mount Kinkazan to the northeast of central Gifu, facing the Nagara River. Prior to a severe flood in 1586, the Kiso River ran through north of its current riverbed and was much closer to the castle, so Gifu Castle was protected by two large rivers. It also commanded the main route into Mino Province from then Tōkaidō highway which connected Kyoto with the eastern provinces of Japan.

== History ==
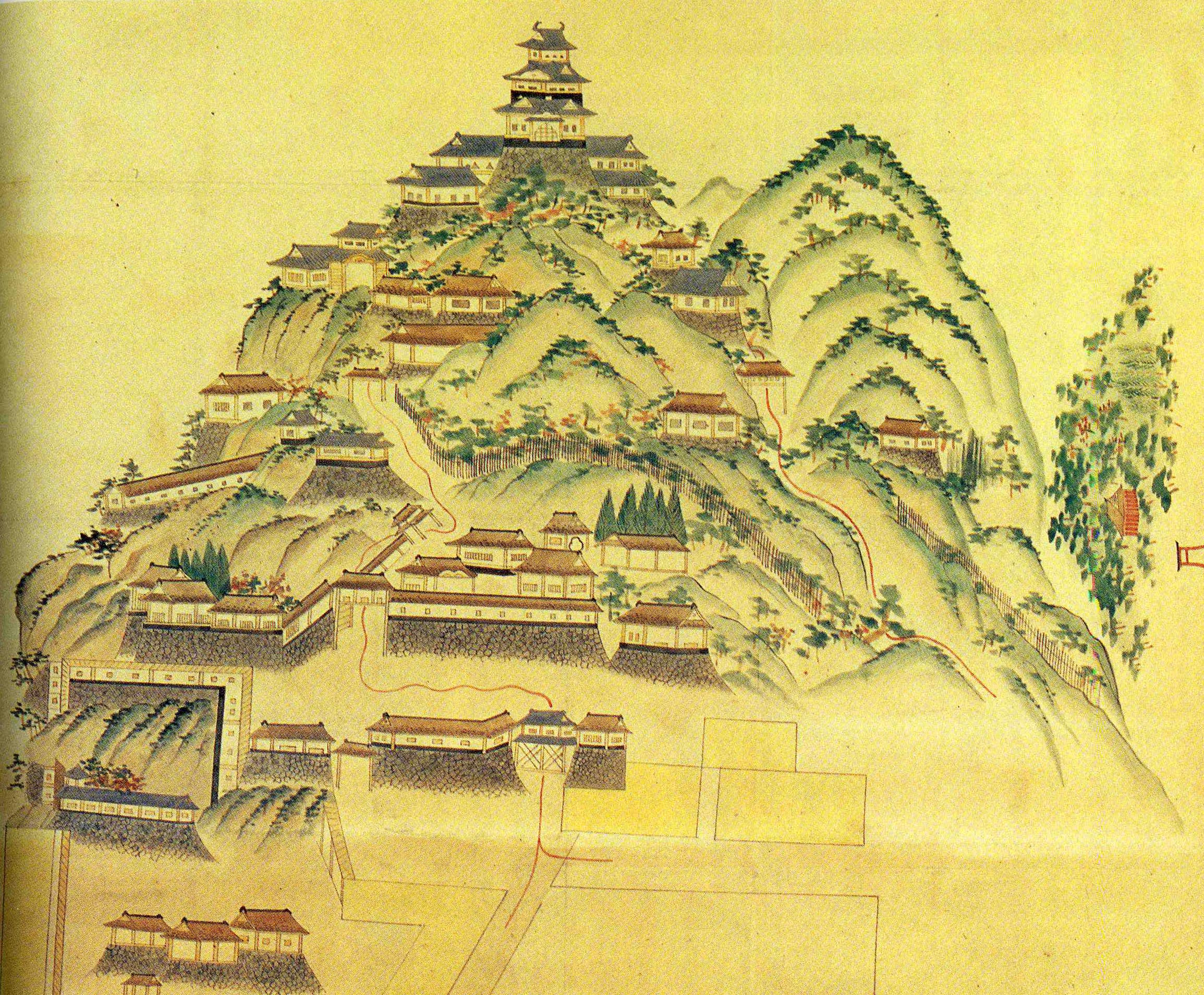
View of the castle complex, which covered the whole Mount Kinka from top to bottom (painting from Edo period)

The first Gifu Castle was first built by the Nikaidō clan between 1201 and 1204 during the Kamakura period. Originally little more than a small fort, it was reconstructed on a much larger scale in the Muromachi period by Saitō Toshinaga (d.1460). Toshinaga had served the title of shugo of Mino Province, but due to internal conflicts, the Saitō clan had been supplanted in turn by the Toki clan. The clan's fortunes were restored in the form of an adventurer from Kyoto who assumed the name of Saitō Dōsan. Also known as the "Viper of Mino", Saitō Dōsan ruthlessly overcame his enemies, expelled the Toki clan, and defeated an invasion from neighboring Owari Province led by Oda Nobuhide. Saitō Dōsan was killed in a revolt by his own son, Saitō Yoshitatsu. Although Yoshiyasu showed promise as a ruler, he died at the age of 34, leaving Inabayama Castle to his son Saitō Tatsuoki.

During the Sengoku period a samurai in the service of the Saitō clan by the name of Takenaka Hanbei went to Inabayama Castle, ostensibly to visit his sick brother. This was a ruse, and in reality, he went to the castle intending to assassinate Saitō Tatsuoki. When Hanbei struck at him, Tatsuoki was very confused—believing an enemy army had come to attack him—and fled. Thus, Takenaka Hanbei obtained Inabayama Castle with relative ease and with only 13 retainers. Later, he returned the castle to his lord, but Tatsuoki had lost an immeasurable amount of reputation and honor due to his perceived cowardly flight from the castle and many of his retainers left his service.

In 1567, Oda Nobunaga launched an attack on Mino Province from Sunomata Castle, led his forces across the Kiso River, and marched straight to the castle town of Inoguchi (now Gifu city) attracting the support of many former Saitō retainers along the way. Nobunaga laid siege to Inabayama Castle on 13 September. Even though the defenders were demoralized to see the banners of Saitō retainers among the attacking army, the mountaintop castle was still in a nearly impregnable position. The siege took about two weeks. Near the end of the siege, Nobunaga's retainer Kinoshita Tōkichirō led a small party up the steep cliffs, entered the castle from the unguarded rear, and opened the front gates, allowing the attacking forces to enter. After Tatsuoki fled, Nobunaga made the castle his primary base-of-operations.

Nobunaga renamed the stronghold "Gifu Castle," following an example set by an ancient Chinese practice. Nobunaga then proceeded to renovate the castle into a far more impressive and grandiose structure than its previous incarnation. He constructed a tenshu on the top of the mountain and brought in many huge stones to bolster its ramparts. Luis Frois, a renowned Jesuit Missionary from Portugal, was personally invited by Nobunaga to visit the castle. After a short stay in Gifu, Frois praised the castle's extraordinary beauty. Nobunaga used Gifu Castle as his primary residence for about ten years, until the completion of Azuchi Castle in 1579. The whole castle complex reached from top to bottom, with the main keep at the top. Gifu Castle was given to his son, Oda Nobutada, who was also killed along with his father by the forces of Akechi Mitsuhide at the Honnō-ji Incident in 1582. Toyotomi Hideyoshi then awarded the castle to Nobunaga's third son, Oda Nobutaka. However, Nobutaka later sided with Shibata Katsuie against Hideyoshi and was forced to commit seppuku at Gifu Castle. Hideyoshi then placed Oda Hidenobu, Nobutada's son, in charge of Gifu Castle. After Hideyoshi's death, Hidenobu overruled the objections of his retainers, and sided with Ishida Mitsunari against the forces of Tokugawa Ieyasu.

The subsequent Battle of Gifu Castle in 1600 served as a prelude to both the Battle of Sekigahara and the fall of Gifu Castle after a siege of only one day. Hidenobu was expelled to live the rest of his days as a monk at Mount Koya.

With the establishment of the Tokugawa shogunate, Gifu Castle was awarded to Ieyasu's son-in-law, Okudaira Nobumasa. However, due to its poor state of repair, Nobumasa decided to abolish Gifu Castle and to relocate to at the base of the mountain, and built Kanō Castle in 1603. Some of the structures of Gifu Castle, such as its largest three-storey yagura were dismantled and re-erected at the new location.

The main keep was rebuilt in the 1910s with wooden building material repurposed from the old bridge across the Nagara river. The keep burnt down in an accident in 1943. The current version of the main keep of Gifu Castle is a concrete and steel structure that was built in the 1950s based on original drawings and plans, albeit with some changes.

== Present day ==
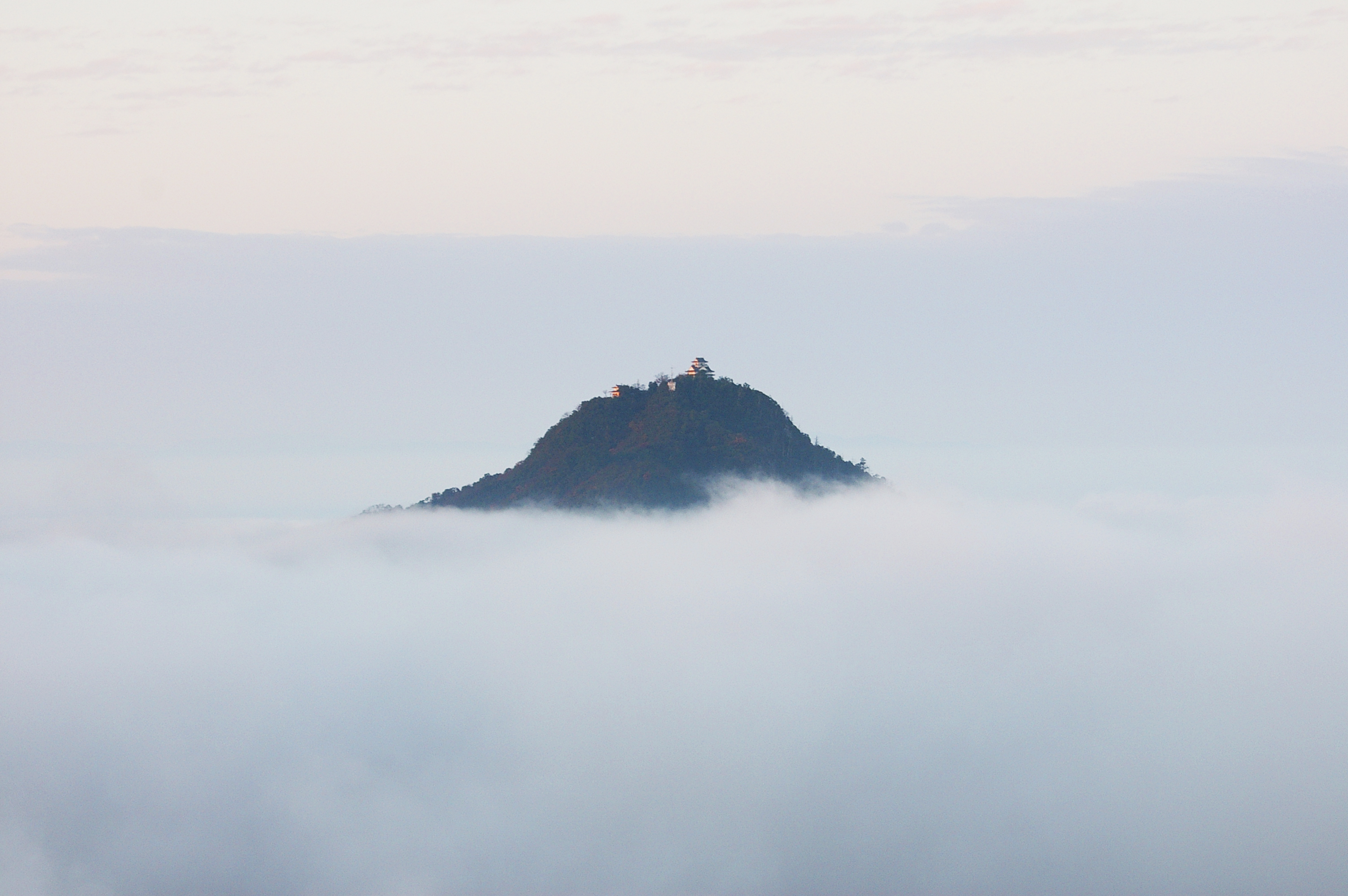
Gifu Castle above the clouds

Inside the reconstructed keep is a museum with three floors containing exhibits representing the castle's past. With maps, weapons, pictures and other artifacts on display, visitors can recreate the story of Gifu Castle. On the top floor of the castle, an observation deck, with a 360-degree panoramic view of the surrounding area, including the Nagara River and Nagoya. At various points throughout the year, the castle is also open to night viewing, providing an awe-inspiring view of the city. The newly opened Gifu City Tower 43 also provides panoramic views of the city and is open late year-round; however, its views are limited to only a few compass directions. Lights, walkways and signs that were added during 2005's beautification campaign make visiting the castle even more convenient and informative.

== Gifu Castle Archives Museum ==
When visitors pay the entrance fee to Gifu Castle, they also receive entrance to the Gifu Castle Archives Museum, located approximately 70 m (230 ft) from the entrance to Gifu Castle. Inside the museum, visitors will find more archives related to Gifu Castle and its past residents. The second floor focuses on musical instruments from Japan's past and present. Additionally, there are pictures of castles throughout Japan adorning the walls of the museum.

== Castle operating hours ==
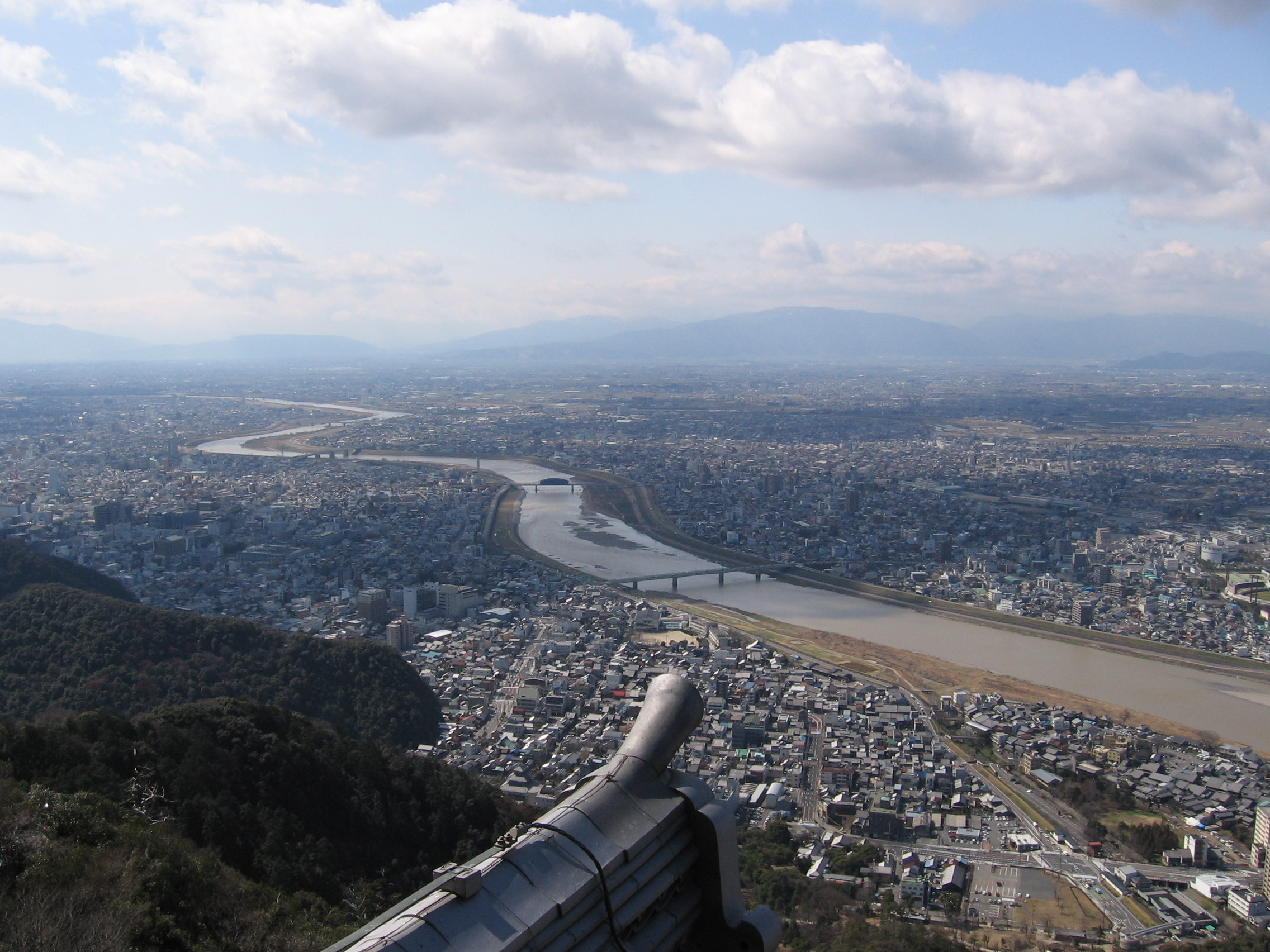
View from the top of Gifu Castle

- Normal hours

March 16–May 11: 9:30 to 17:30
May 12–October 16: 8:30 to 17:30
October 17–March 15: 9:30 to 16:30

- Night viewing

April 28–May 6: until 21:30
July 14–August 31: until 22:00
September 1–October 14: until 21:30 (Saturday, Sunday, and holidays only)
October 15–November 30: until 18:30

== Access ==
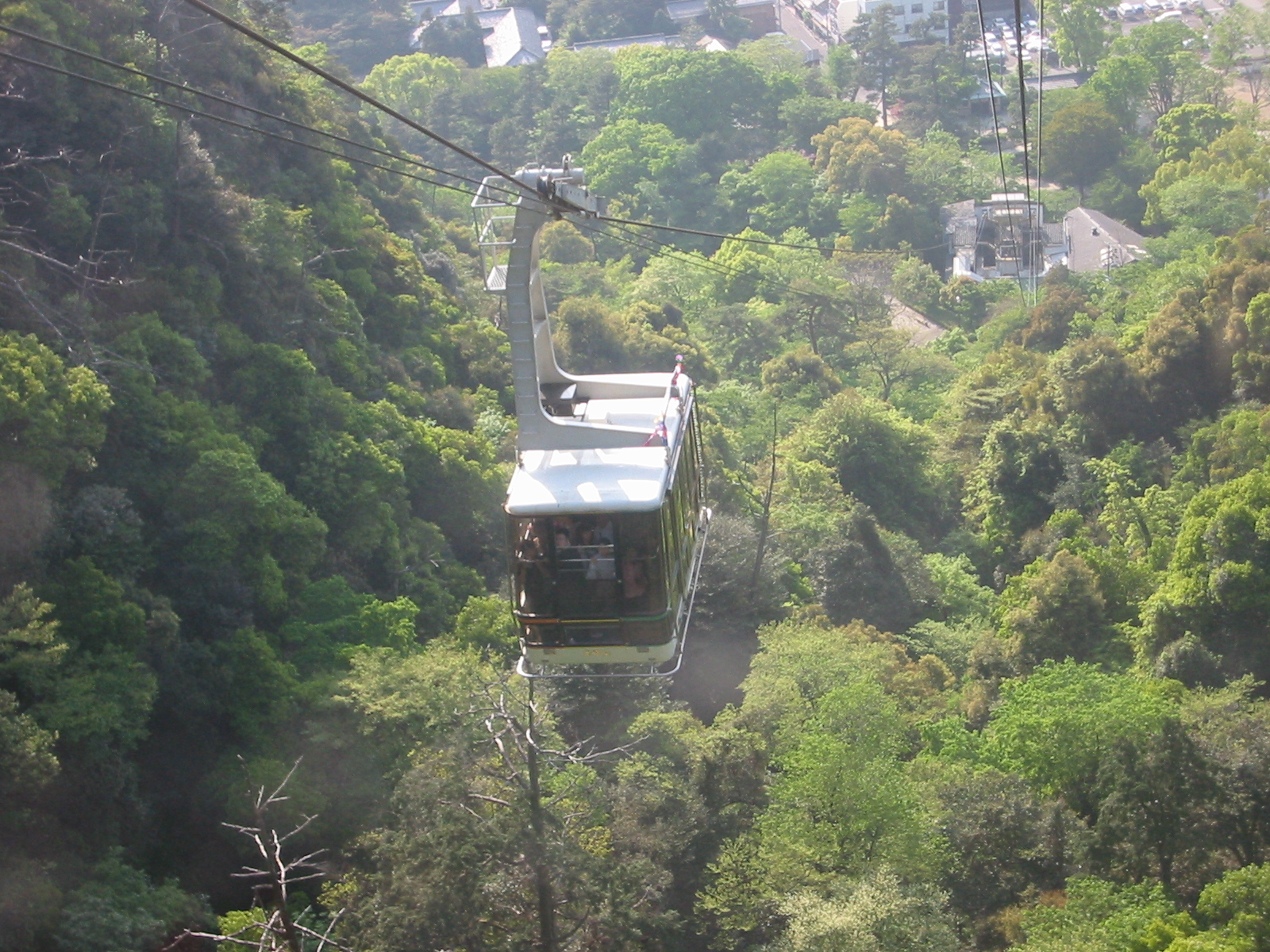
Mount Kinka Ropeway

Mount Kinkazan offers hiking trails of varying difficulty to Gifu Castle and take approximately one hour. Visitors can also take the Mt. Kinka Ropeway that originates in Gifu Park to the mountain's summit, from which Gifu Castle is just a short walk away.

To get to Gifu Park, you can board buses operated by Gifu Bus at either JR Gifu Station (Bus Platform 11 or 12) or Meitetsu Gifu Station (Bus Platform 4). The bus takes approximately 15 minutes to get to the bus stop for Gifu Park and the Museum of History (Gifu Kōen, Rekishi Hakubutsukan-mae).

== See also ==
- List of Historic Sites of Japan (Gifu)
- Gifu Goten

== Literature ==
- Benesch, Oleg and Ran Zwigenberg (2019). Japan's Castles: Citadels of Modernity in War and Peace. Cambridge: Cambridge University Press. p. 374. ISBN 9781108481946.
- De Lange, William (2021). An Encyclopedia of Japanese Castles. Groningen: Toyo Press. pp. 600 pages. ISBN 978-9492722300.
- Schmorleitz, Morton S. (1974). Castles in Japan. Tokyo: Charles E. Tuttle Co. p. 117. ISBN 0-8048-1102-4.
