= Gifu Park =

Public park in Gifu, Japan

Coordinates: 35°26′0.1″N 136°46′30.8″E

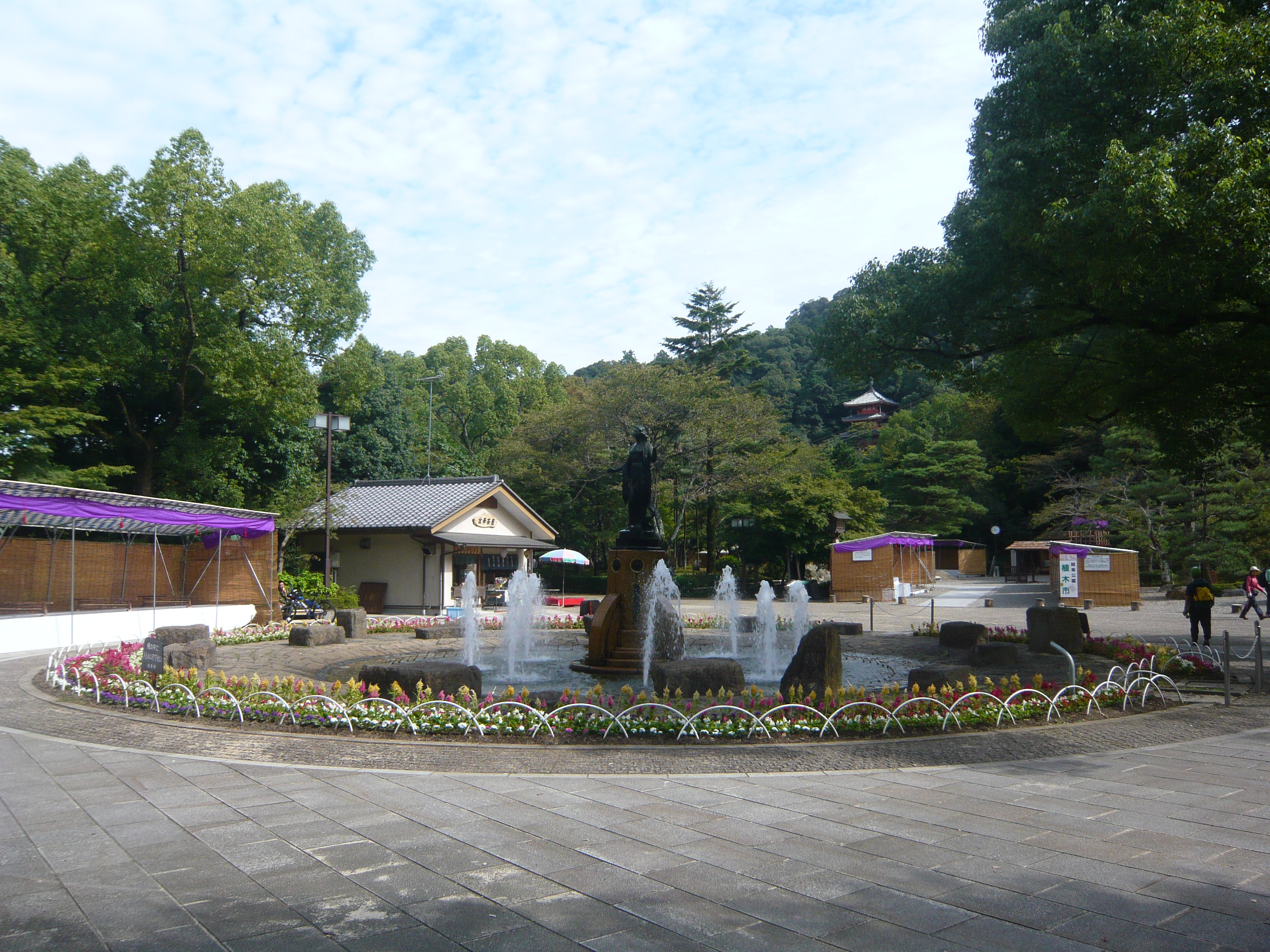
Fountain near the park entrance

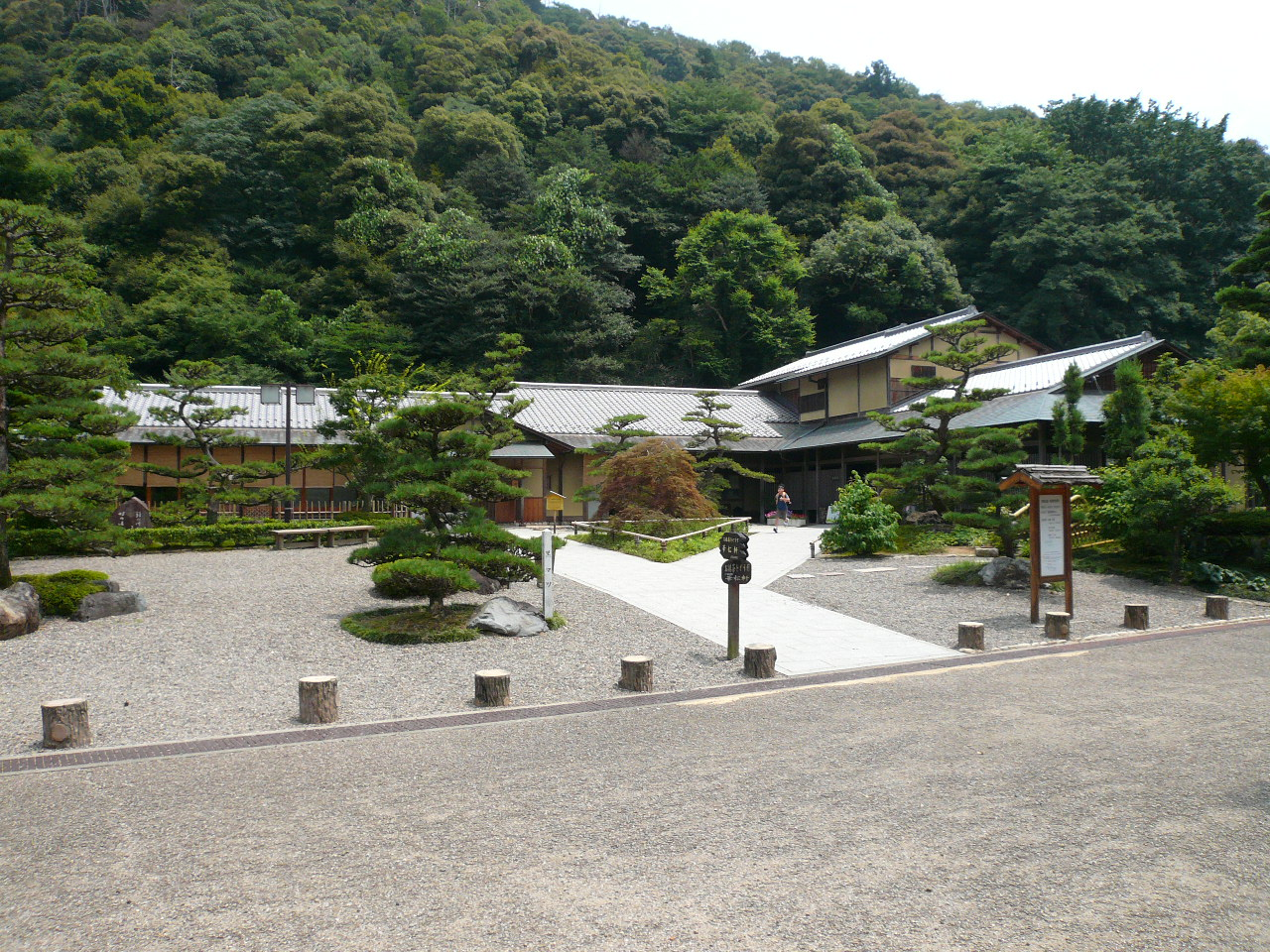
Rest area in Gifu Park

Gifu Park (岐阜公園, Gifu Kōen) is a public park located at the base of Mount Kinka in the city of Gifu, Gifu Prefecture, Japan. Inside the park, there are many attractions, including Gifu Castle, Mount Kinka, the Mt. Kinka Ropeway, the Gifu City Museum of History, the Eizō & Tōichi Katō Memorial Art Museum, and the Nawa Insect Museum. In 2006, it was selected as one of Japan's Top 100 Public Historical Parks.

== History ==
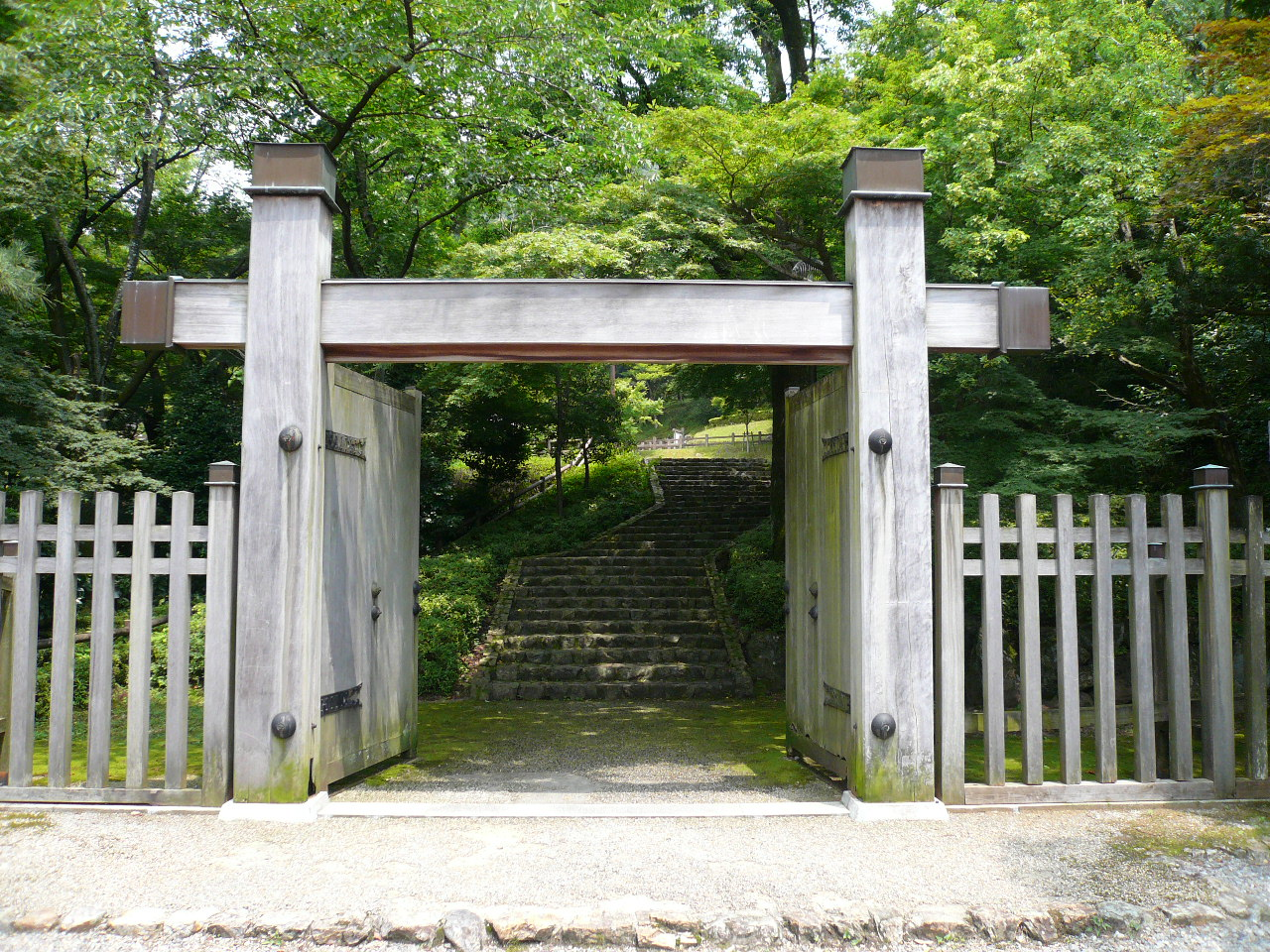
Entrance to Senjō-jiki

The area that makes up Gifu Park has a long and important role in the history of Gifu City. Though Mount Kinka was strategically important for military purposes, living in the castle atop the mountain would have made daily life very difficult. As such, many important rulers built their main residences at the base of the mountain in modern-day Gifu Park.

One of those residences used to belong to Oda Nobunaga. It was called Senjō-jiki (千畳敷), which literally means "one-thousand tatami mats." The residence was so large that it covered approximately two-thirds of the present day park. Much was known about the residence because the Portuguese Jesuit Missionary Luis Frois wrote about it extensively in his journals during his time visiting with Nobunaga, even going so far as to say that Gifu was "as bustling as Babylon." However, until excavation began in 1984, it was unknown whether or not this was actually Nobunaga's Senjō-jiki.

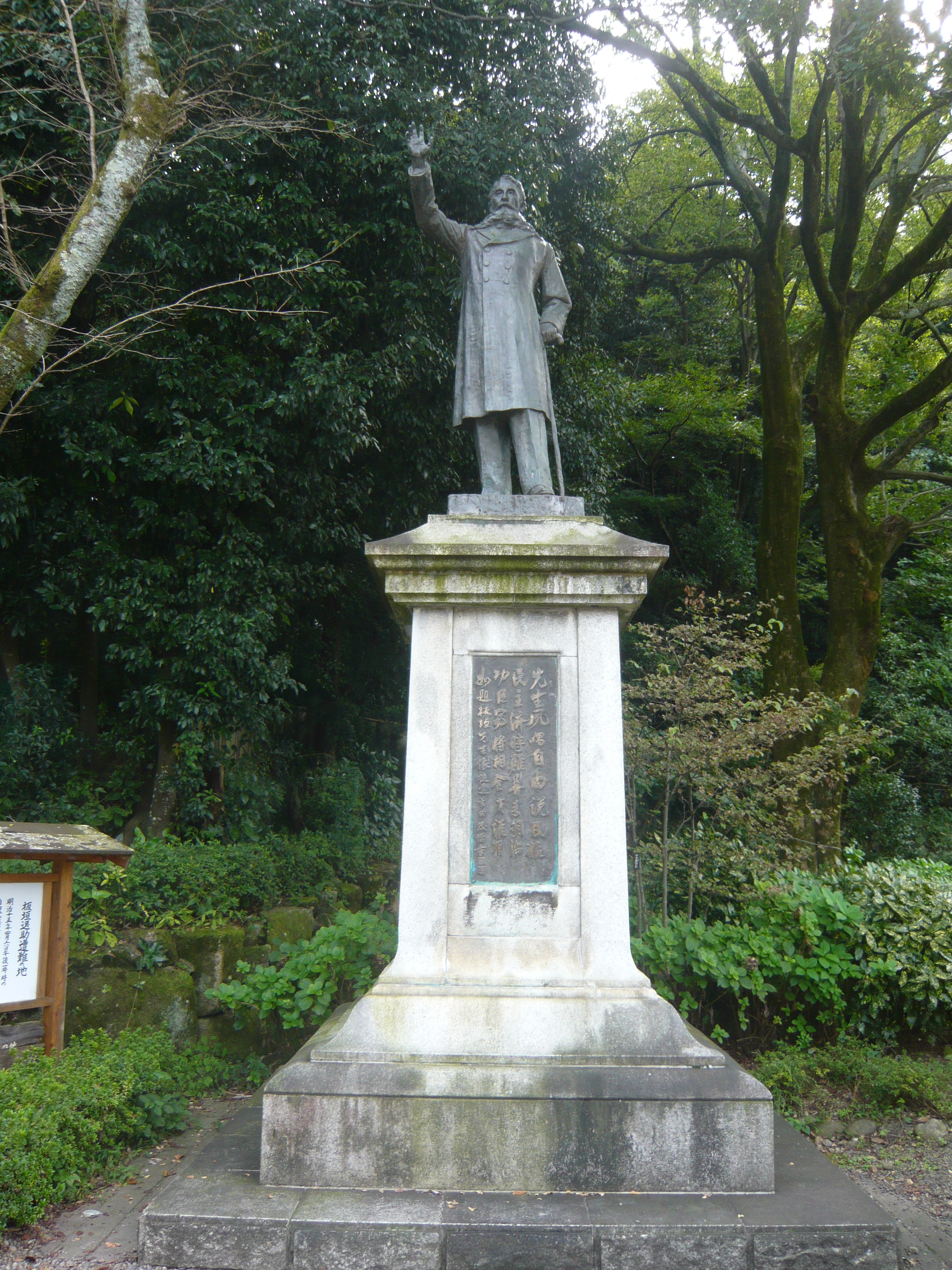
A bronze statue of Itagaki Taisuke in Gifu Park

Additionally, the park has also been home to a zoo, an aquarium, the Gifu Prefectural Library, and the Gifu City Science Museum. However, all those facilities have been closed or moved.

=== Park timeline ===
- 1882 Permission to open the park was granted.
- 1882 Taisuke Itagaki was attacked at the Shintō Chūkyō-in Shrine.
- 1888 Gifu Park was opened.
- 1904 Nawa Insect Museum moved to its present location in the park.
- 1917 The Taisuke Itagaki Statue was erected.
- 1935 The Shintō Chūkyō-in Shrine was moved.
- 1955 Mount Kinka Ropeway was opened.
- 1957 The Gifu Prefectural Library was opened.
- 1985 The Gifu City Museum of History was opened.
- 1995 The library was closed and moved.
- 2001 Oda Nobunaga's Former Residence was excavated.

== Events ==
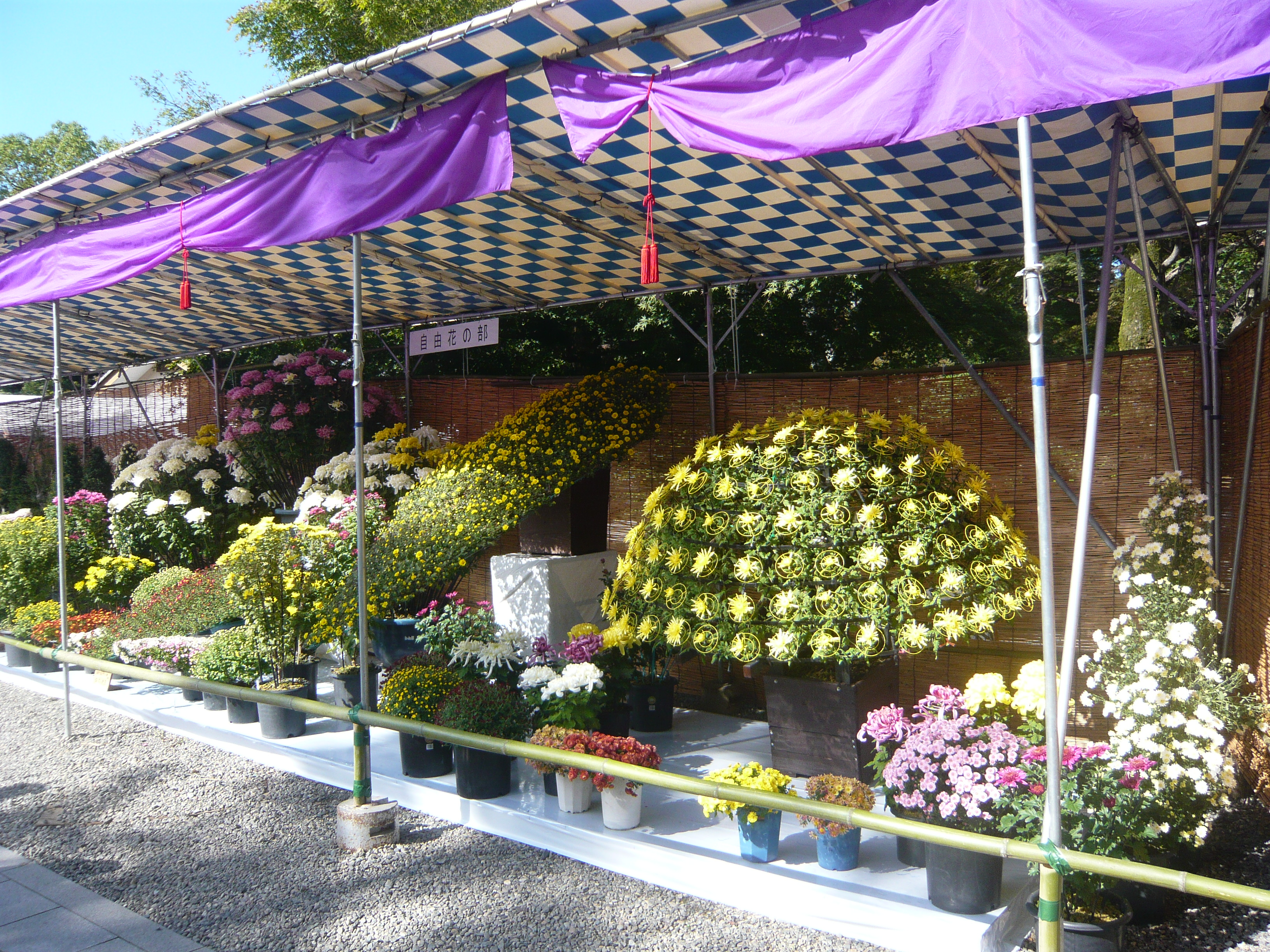
Chrysanthemum Doll and Flower Festival in the background

Gifu Park plays host to numerous events throughout the year. Two popular events are the Gifu Park Illumination, which runs from the end of July to the end of August, and the Chrysanthemum Doll and Flower Festival, which runs from the end of October to the end of November. The park is also known for its smaller events throughout the year, too, including firefly viewing in the summer.

== Current facilities ==
- Oda Nobunaga's Former Residence
- Nobunaga Rakuichi
- Japan-China Friendship Garden
- Gifu Park Visitors' Rest Area
- Three-storied Pagoda
- Taisuke Itagaki Statue
- Wellspring Area

== Former facilities ==
- Zoo
- Aquarium
- Gifu City Science Museum
- Gifu City Prefectural Library

== Access ==
From JR Gifu Station (Bus Platform 11) or Meitetsu Gifu Station (Bus Platform 4), board a bus operated by Gifu Bus that is heading towards Nagara. Get off the bus at "Gifu Koen, Rekishi Hakubutsukan-mae," approximately 15 minutes from the train stations.

== Images ==
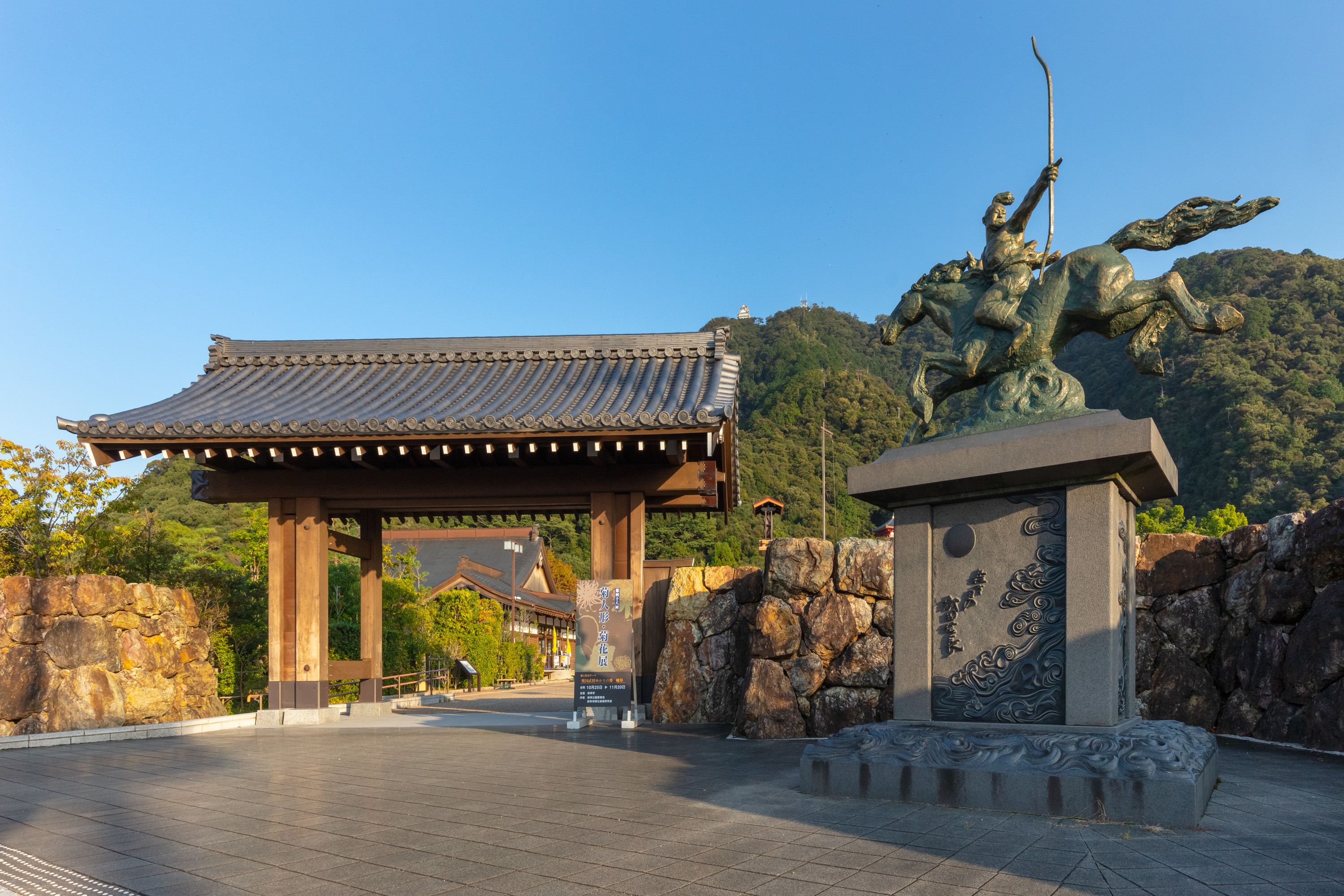

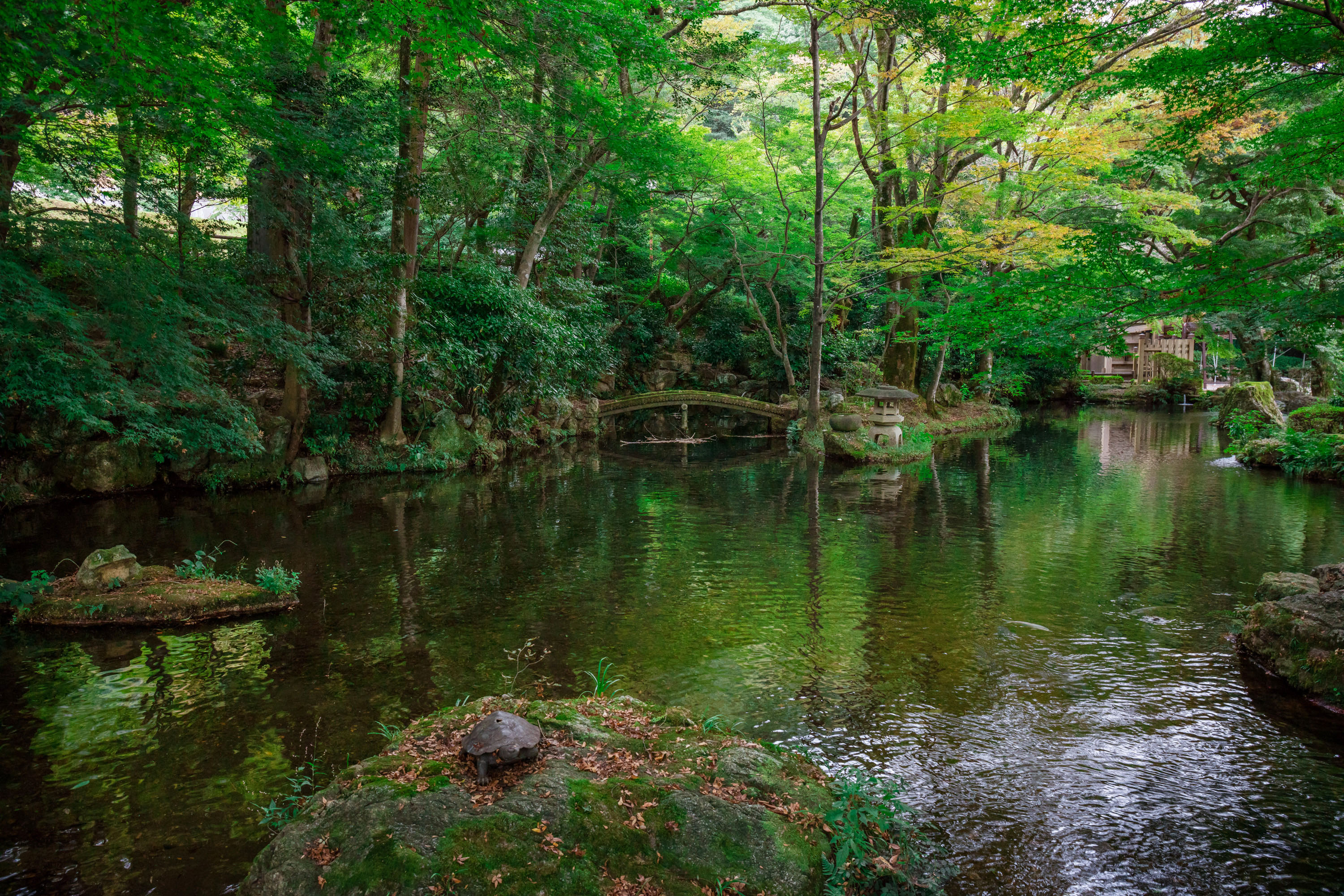

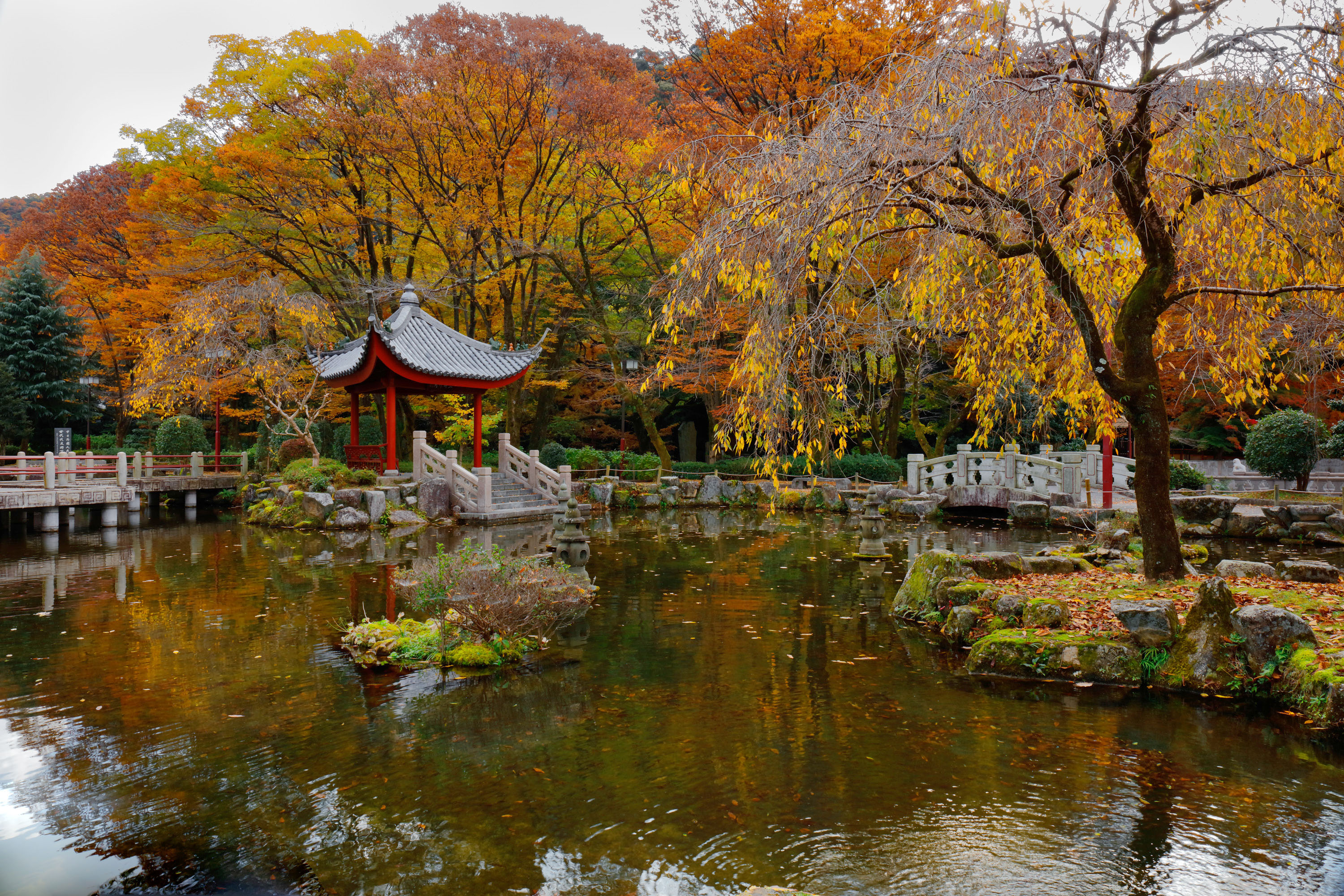

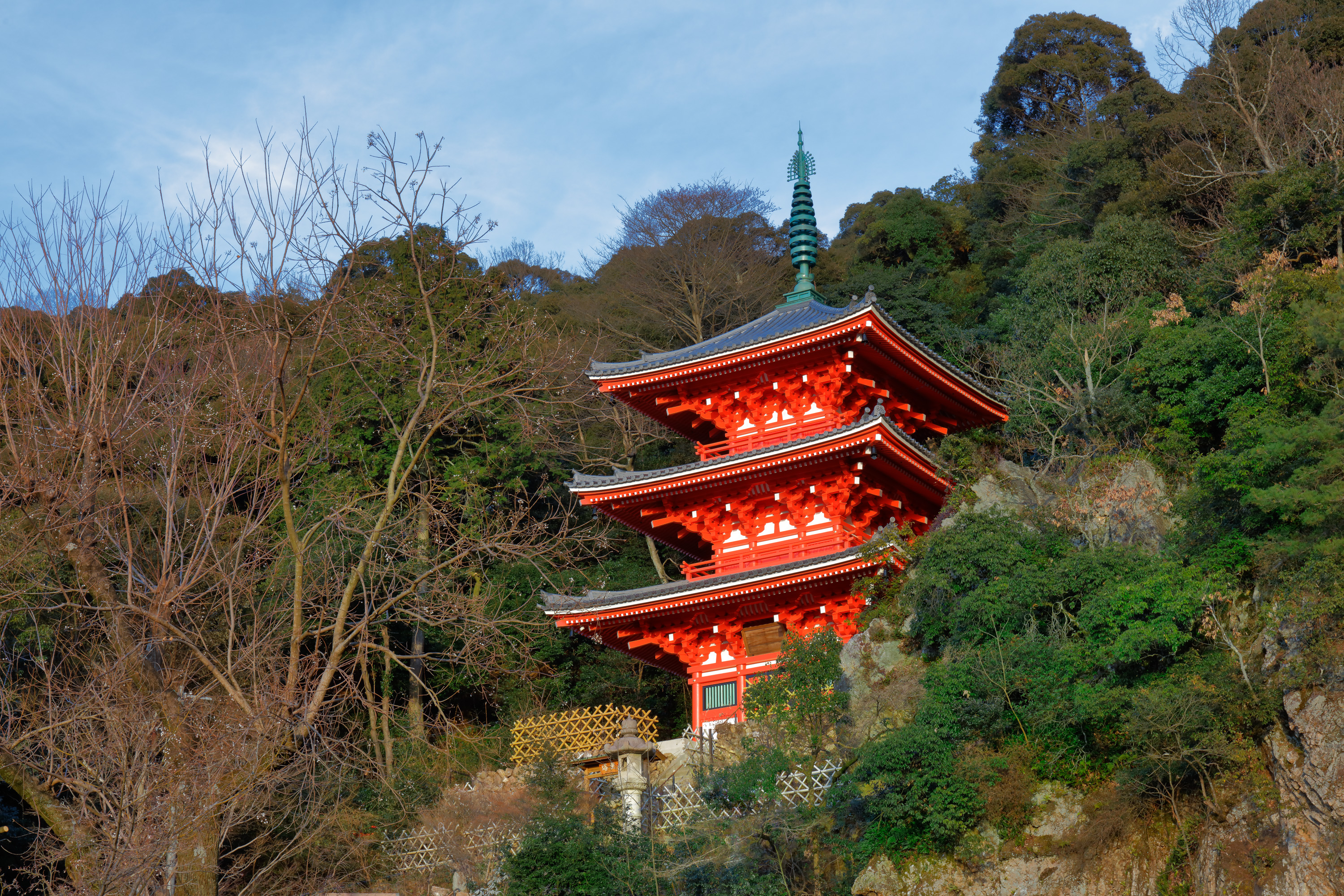

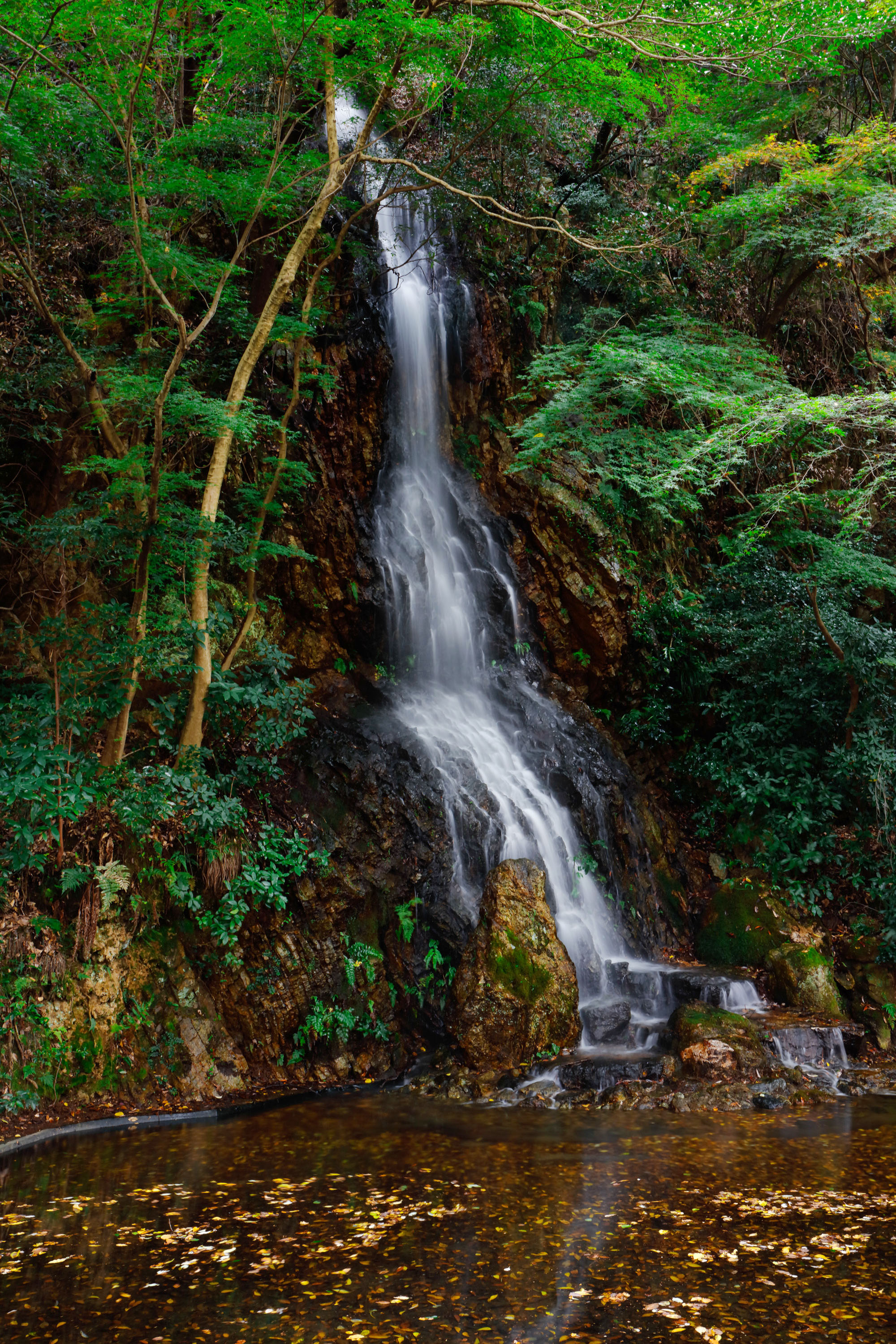

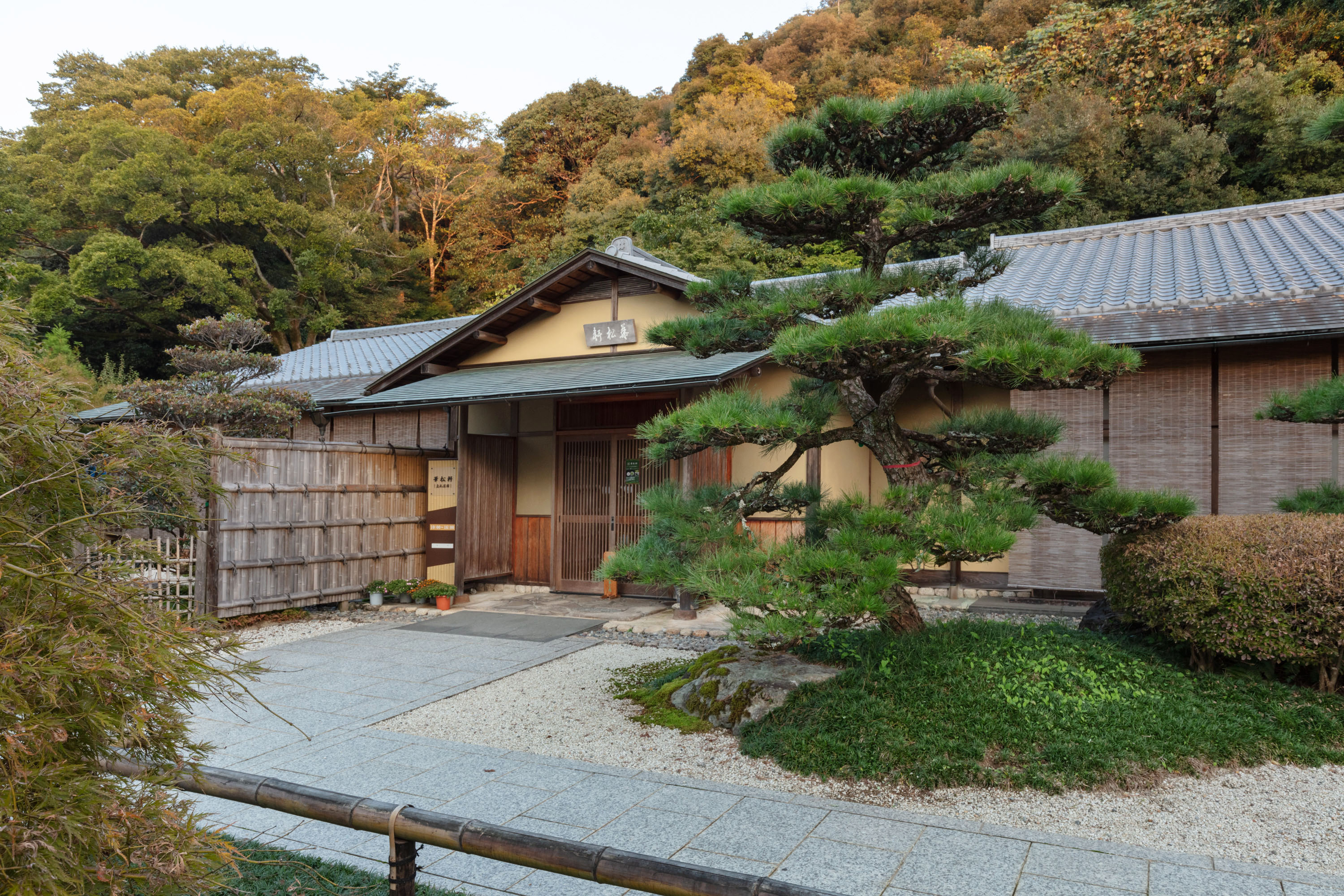

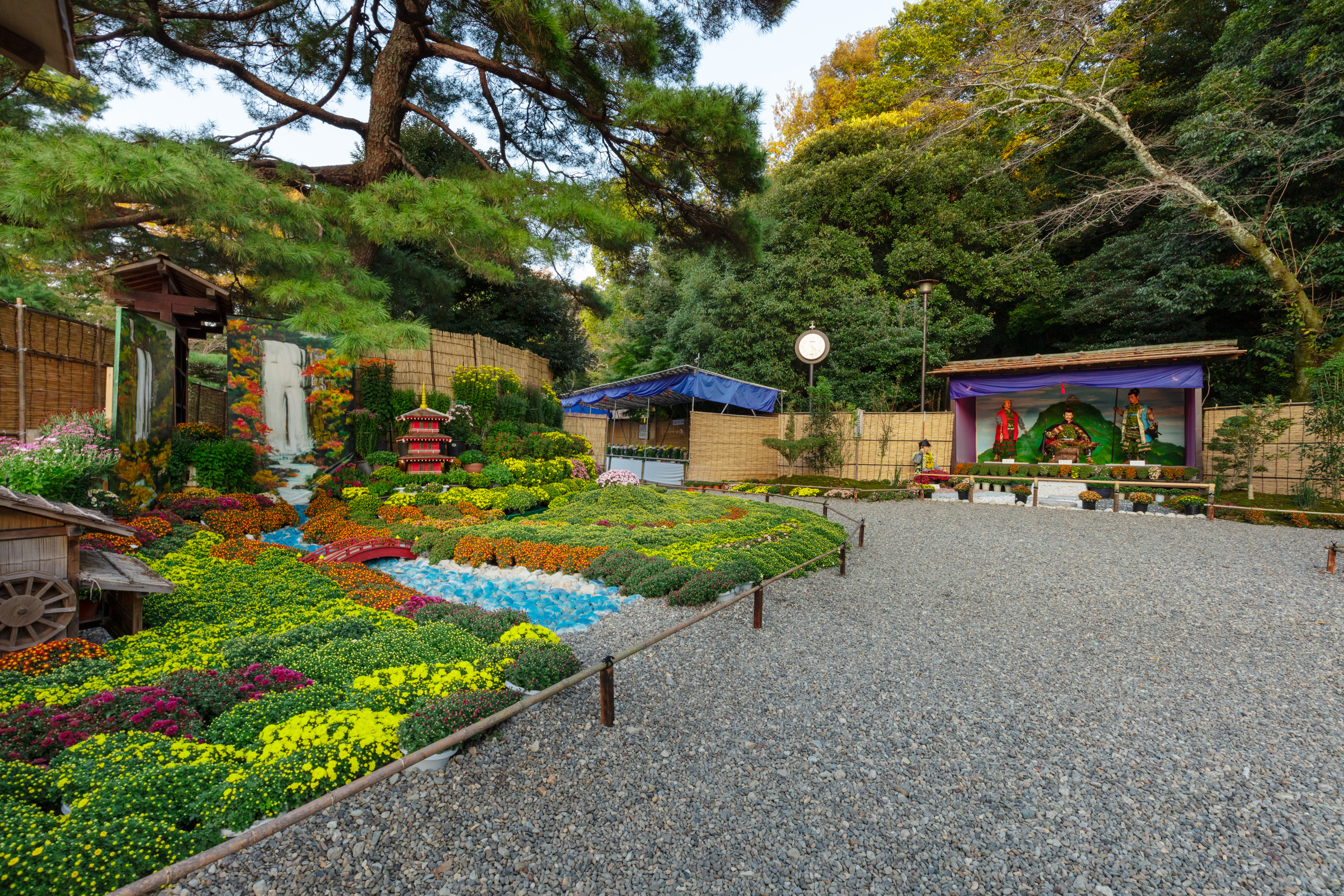

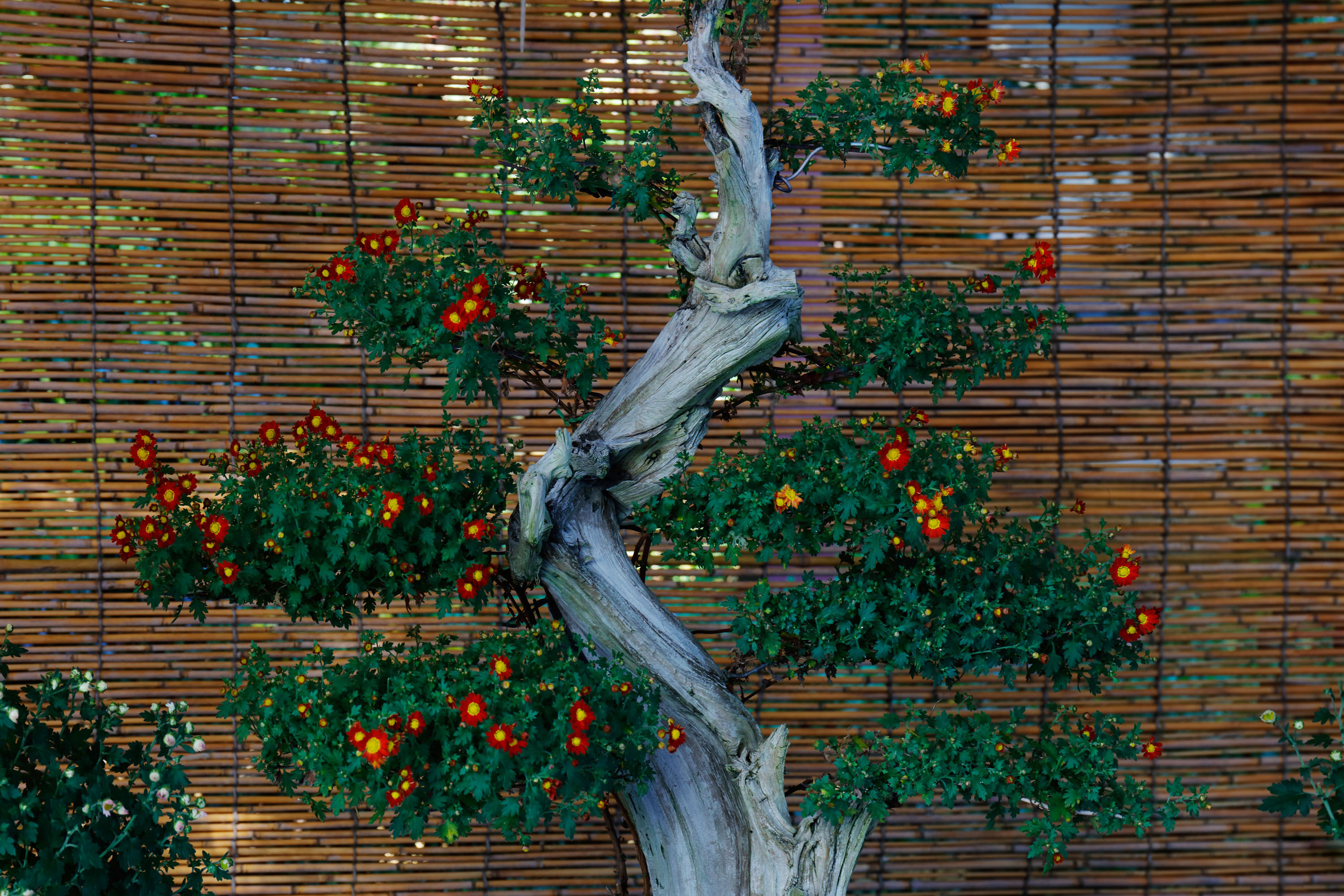
