= Mount Kinka (Gifu) =

Famous mountain in central Gifu, Gifu Prefecture, Japan

- 金華山
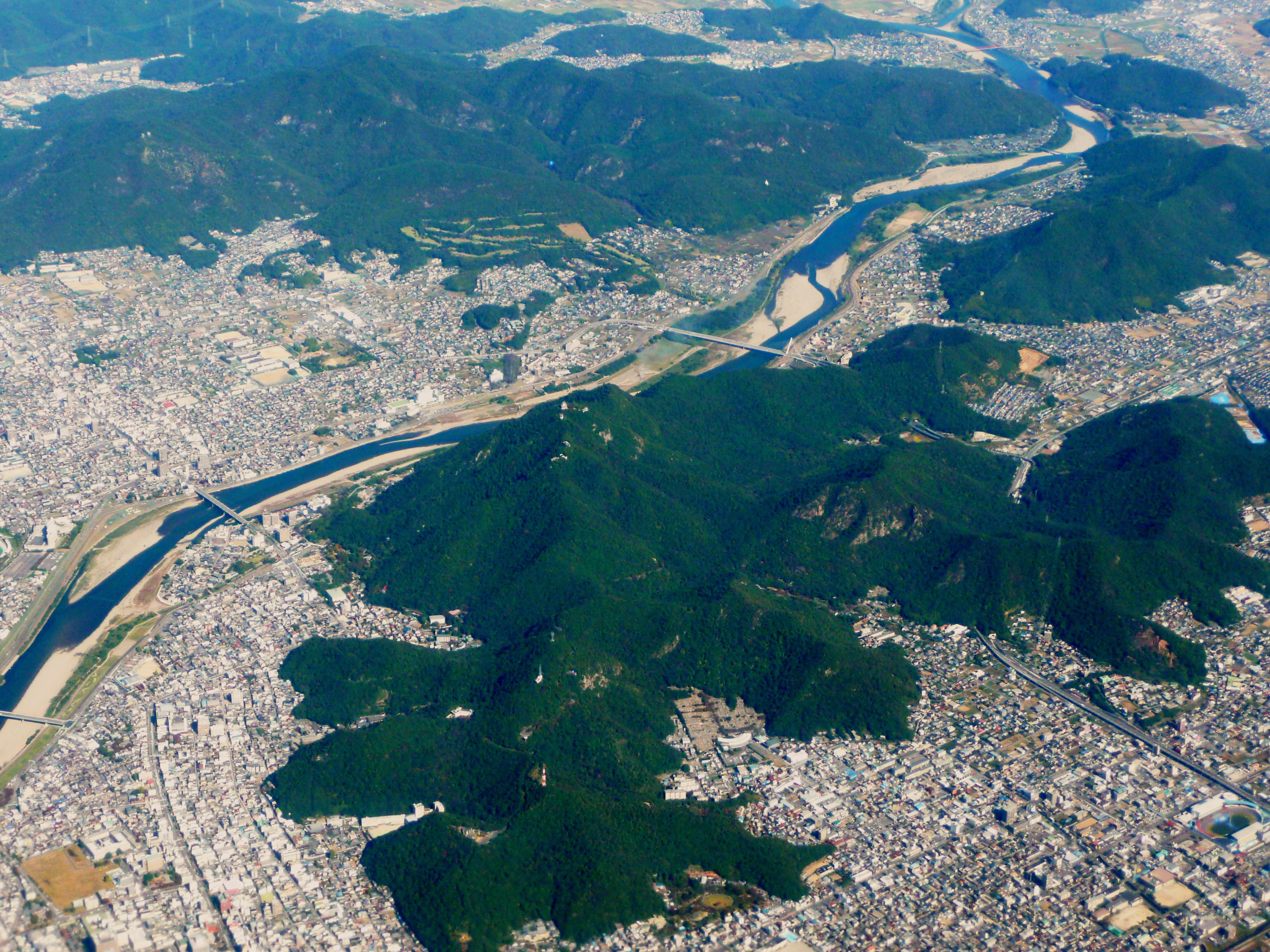
- Mt. Kinka

Highest point
- Elevation: 328.9 m (1,079 ft)
- Coordinates: 35°26′N 136°46′E

Geography
- Location within Japan
- Location: Gifu, Gifu Prefecture, Japan
- Parent range: none
- Topo map(s): Geographical Survey Institute, 25000:1 白山, 50000:1 白山

Geology
- Mountain type: Sedimentary

Climbing
- Easiest route: Mt. Kinka Ropeway

Mt. Kinka (金華山, Kinka-zan), also known as Kinkazan, is located in the heart of the city of Gifu, Gifu Prefecture, Japan, and rises to a height of 329 m (1,079 ft). Previously called Mt. Inaba (稲葉山, Inaba-yama), it has long served as the representative symbol of Gifu. It stands along the Nagara River, creating bountiful nature within the city. Though it is the most famous mountain in the city, Mount Dodo, to the north, is the tallest.

== History ==
First built by the Nikaidō family during the Kamakura period, Gifu Castle atop Mt. Kinka has gone through many forms, with the current building being constructed in 1956. One of its first major residents was Saitō Dōsan, who lived in the castle when it was still being called Inabayama Castle and the mountain was still called Mt. Inaba. The next resident of the castle, Oda Nobunaga, changed the castle's name at the same time that he changed the name of the surrounding town and the mountain.

The castle eventually fell into disrepair and vanished from Gifu's skyline. However, it was rebuilt in 1956 and that is the castle that still stands today. During reconstruction, tiles were carried to the top by volunteers. Those who helped were able to write messages on the roof tiles before they were put in place. Those who helped were able to experience what it was like when the castle was originally built many years before. From the top of the castle, visitors have a 360-degree view, effectively giving them a view to all the borders of the city of Gifu. Inside the castle are many artifacts from its past.

Centuries ago, the mountain was protected as a hunting ground for the Owari Clan, preserving the trees from being used to build the area as it grew from a small town to a large city. Today, the forest is designated as a national forest, giving protection to the over 700 types of plants and 80 types of birds that can be found on the mountain.

In 2005, the top of the mountain was renovated, adding lights and walkways to improve the ease of use to visitors of the castle. The new signs provide additional information about the castle and the surrounding structures, while the lights add to the allure of the castle's panoramic night viewing.

== Reaching the summit ==
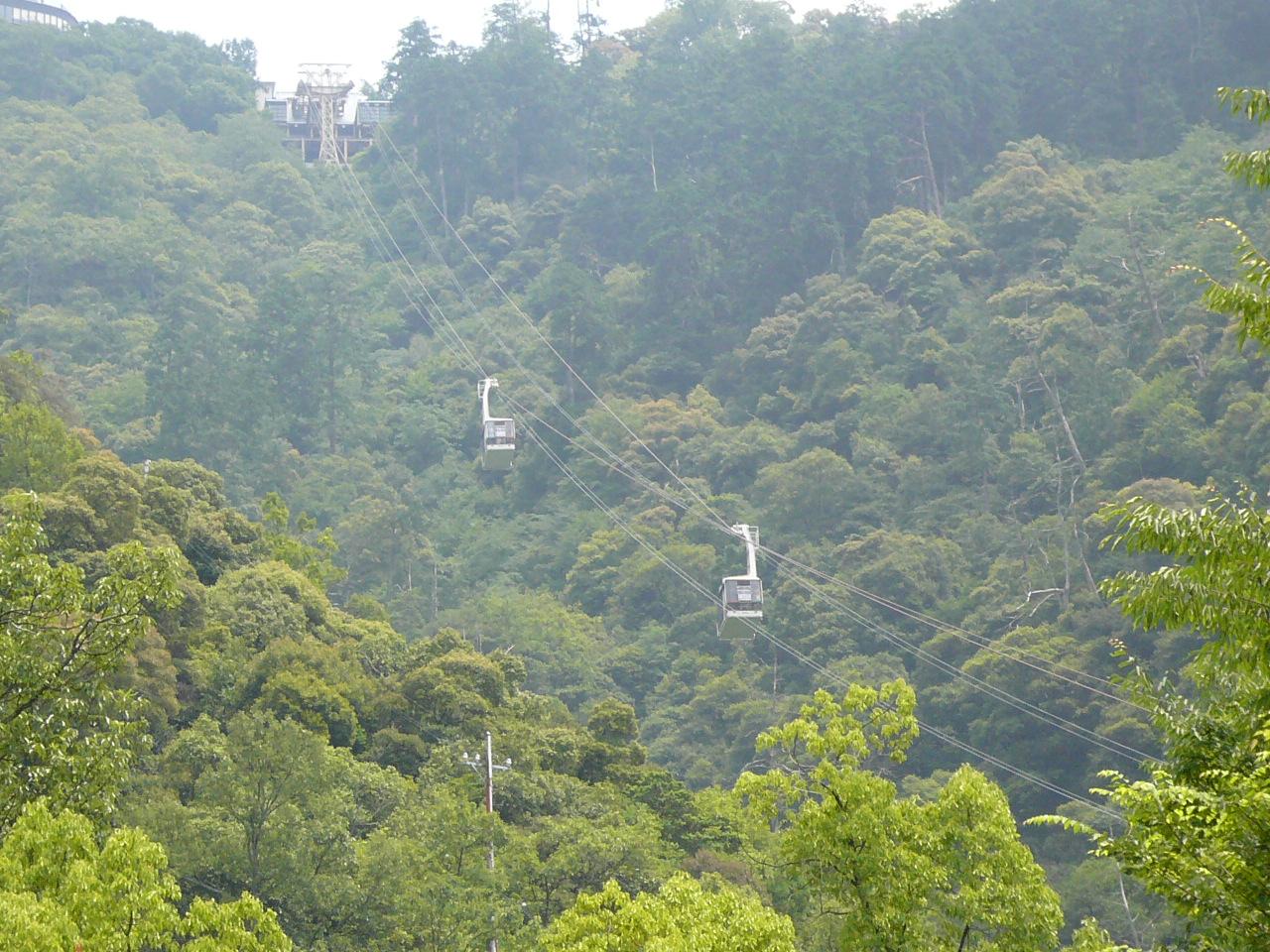
The ropeway up Mt. Kinka

Mt. Kinka has four marked trails for hikers who wish to walk to the top of the mountain.

The other option for reaching the summit is by taking the Mt. Kinka Ropeway, which first opened in 1955. This ropeway enables visitors to reach the top of the mountain in less than five minutes. The hours of operation for the ropeway vary depending on the seasons throughout the year, but it is generally open from 9:00am to 6:00pm. On weekdays, it runs every 15 minutes, while on weekends and holidays, it runs every 10 minutes.

== Summit attractions ==
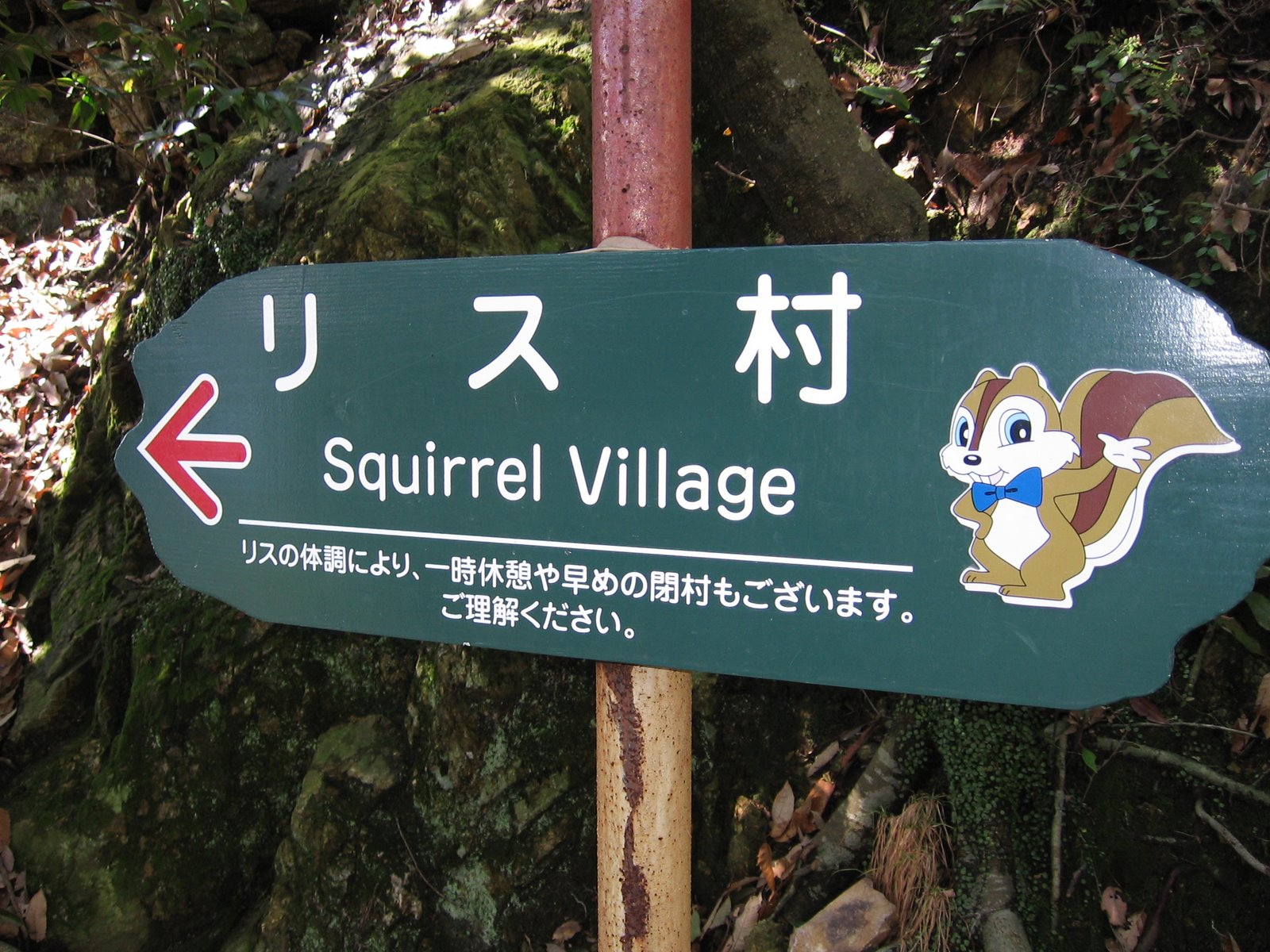
To the Squirrel Village!

Mt. Kinka has three main attractions at its summit. Gifu Castle and the Gifu Castle Archives Museum offers insight into the history behind the castle and the mountain. The Observation Deck Restaurant offers visitors a panoramic view of the city, in addition to hot meals. There is an observation deck on top of the restaurant that provides a view that cannot be seen from Gifu Castle. Also, in the Mt. Kinka Squirrel Village, visitors can play with and feed squirrels while learning about the four species inside the Squirrel Village.

== Area attractions ==
Additionally, there are many attractions at the base of Mt. Kinka.

- Gifu City Museum of History
- Gifu Park
- Eizō & Tōichi Katō Memorial Art Museum
- Inaba Shrine
- Site of Oda Nobunaga's Former Residence, Senjō-jiki (千畳敷)
- Nawa Insect Museum
