= Tōichi Katō =

Japanese painter (1916–1996)

Tōichi Katō (加藤 東一)
- Born: 6 January 1916; Gifu, Gifu, Japan
- Died: 3 December 1996 (aged 80)
- Occupation: Painter
- Known for: nihonga-style painting

Tōichi Katō (加藤 東一, Katō Tōichi; 6 January 1916 – 3 December 1996) was a Japanese painter in the Nihonga style and board chairman of the Nitten, a significant Japanese art conference. He and his older brother, Eizō Katō, have a museum dedicated to their works in Gifu, Gifu Prefecture.

== Biography ==
- 1916 Born in Gifu's Mitono-machi as the fifth son of a lacquerware merchant
- 1934 Graduated from Gifu Junior High School
- 1941 Entered into the Tokyo Fine Arts School in Nihonga Studies
- 1947 Graduates from the Tokyo Fine Arts School in Nihonga Studies; enters his first work (白暮) to the Japan Art Academy's third annual exhibition and has it selected

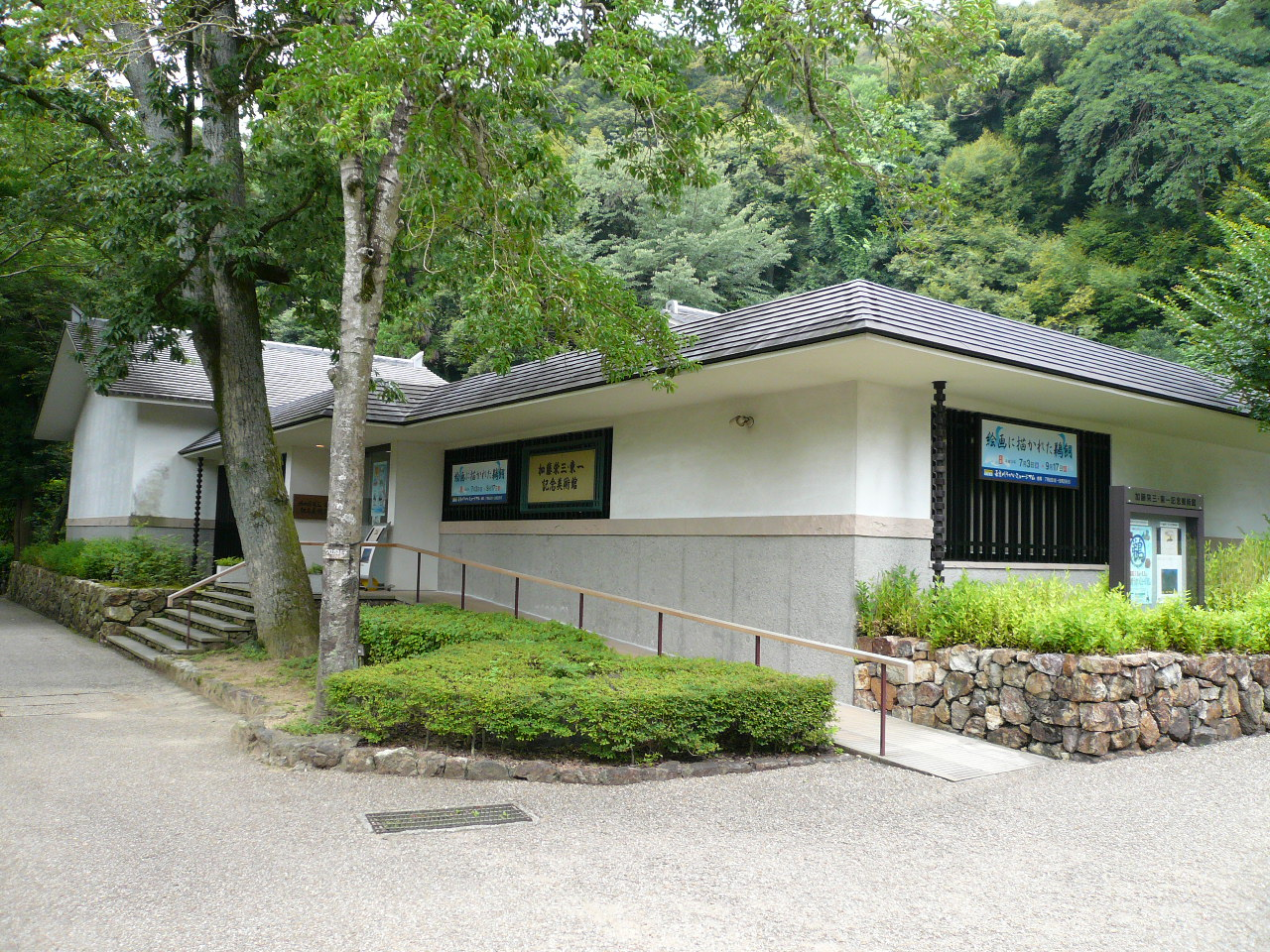
Eizō & Tōichi Katō Memorial Art Museum

- 1991 The Eizō & Tōichi Katō Memorial Art Museum was opened in Gifu
- 1993 Completes the wall partition for the great alcove at Kinkaku-ji
- 1995 Obtains recognition from Japan as an "outstanding contributor to culture"
- 1996 Receives honorary citizenship in Gifu
- 1996 Dies of pneumonia at the age of 80
- 1997 Receives honorary citizenship in Fujisawa, Kanagawa Prefecture
