= Eizō & Tōichi Katō Memorial Art Museum =

Coordinates: 35.435001°N 136.775092°E

Eizō & Tōichi Katō Memorial Art Museum 加藤栄三・東一記念美術館
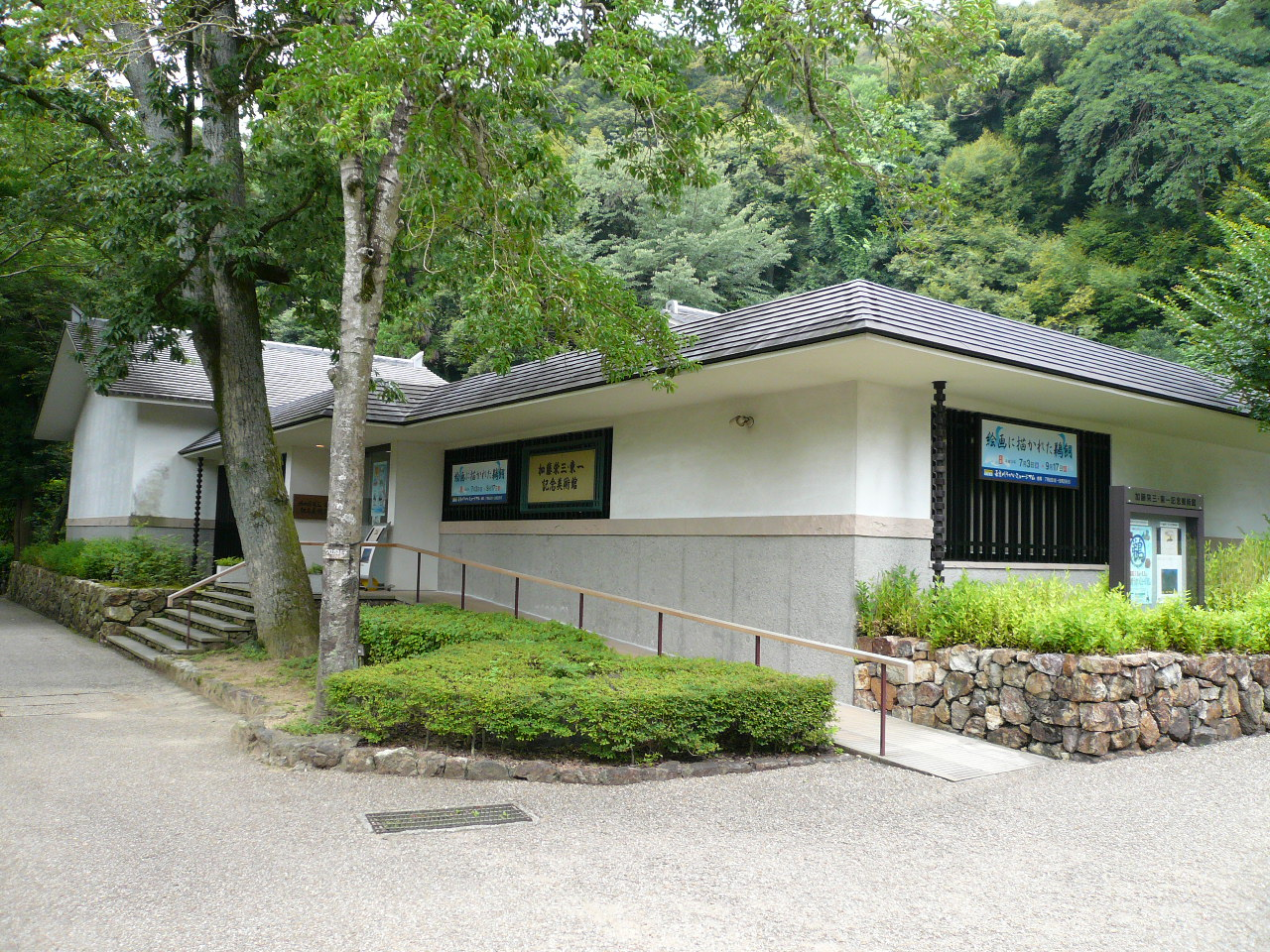
- Established: May 11, 1991
- Location: Gifu Park, Gifu, Gifu, Japan
- Type: Art museum
- Public transit access: Gifu Bus
- Website: Museum homepage

The Eizō & Tōichi Katō Memorial Art Museum (加藤栄三・東一記念美術館, Katō Eizō, Tōichi Kinen Bijutsukan) is a museum located in Gifu Park in the city of Gifu, Gifu Prefecture, Japan. It is dedicated to the works of the brothers Eizō and Tōichi Katō, who were born in the city. It is part of the Gifu City Museum of History.

== Facility layout ==
The facility was built with reinforced concrete for its base and wooden supports for the walls. The total floor space is 490.6 m^{2} (5,281 ft^{2}); each of its two exhibition rooms have an area of 116.7 m^{2} (1,256 ft^{2}), which the rest of the space being dedicated to the reception area, offices and other non-exhibition spaces.

== Facilities information ==
Hours of operation

9:00am to 5:00pm (entry until 4:30pm)

Holidays

Mondays (Tuesday, if Monday is a holiday)
Day after national holidays
Dec. 29 to Jan. 3

- Entrance fee

	Individual Rate	Group Rate
Adult	300 yen	240 yen
Child	150 yen	90 yen

- Group discounts are available to parties of 20 or larger.
- Those over 70 years of age are allowed free admission.

== Access ==
From JR Gifu Station (Bus Platform 11) or Meitetsu Gifu Station (Bus Platform 4), board any bus towards Nagara. Get off the bus at "Gifu Koen, Rekishi Hakubutsukan-mae," approximately 15 minutes from the train stations. The museum is a five-minute walk from there.
