= Eizō Katō =

Japanese artist

Eizō Katō (加藤 栄三)
- Born: August 20, 1906
- Died: May 24, 1972 (aged 65)
- Occupation: Painter
- Known for: nihonga-style painting

Eizō Katō (加藤 栄三, Katō Eizō; August 20, 1906 – May 24, 1972) was a Japanese painter in the nihonga style. He and his younger brother, Tōichi Katō, have a museum dedicated to their works in Gifu, Gifu Prefecture.

== Biography ==
He was born in 1906 Gifu's Mizono-chō as the third son of a lacquerware merchant. His early education took place at local schools when he graduated from Gifu Commercial High School in 1923.

In 1926, he entered into the Tokyo Fine Arts School in Nihonga Studies, where he would spend the next five years studying art and entering competitions. It was in 1929 that he first submitted a work to the Japan Art Academy’s 10th annual event, entering a piece entitled “Small Scenes of a Summer Day” (夏日小景 Natsubi Shōkei). In 1931, he graduated from the Tokyo Fine Arts School in Nihonga Studies. His work was part of the painting event in the art competition at the 1936 Summer Olympics.

- 1939 His work entitled “Moonlit Night” (月夜 Tsukiyo) was a special selection at the Third Shinbunten.
- 1945 Many of his works were destroyed in the air raids of Gifu City on July 9.
- 1950 Split from the Nitten Exhibition.
- 1951 Rejoined the Nitten Exhibition.
- 1956 Entered “Basket Fire” (篝火 Kagaribi) into the 12th Annual Japan Arts Exhibition. It is from this time that he started focusing on cormorant fishing as his subject, about which he created many pieces.
- 1958 At the refounding of the Japan Arts Exhibition, he was named to the exhibition's council.
- 1965 Entered “Thunder God” (雷神 Raijin) in the 8th New Nitten Exhibition.
- 1969 Was named the director of the Japan Arts Exhibition.
- 1972 Died on May 24.
- 1974 The "Eizō Katō Posthumous Exhibitions" were held in Tokyo and Gifu.

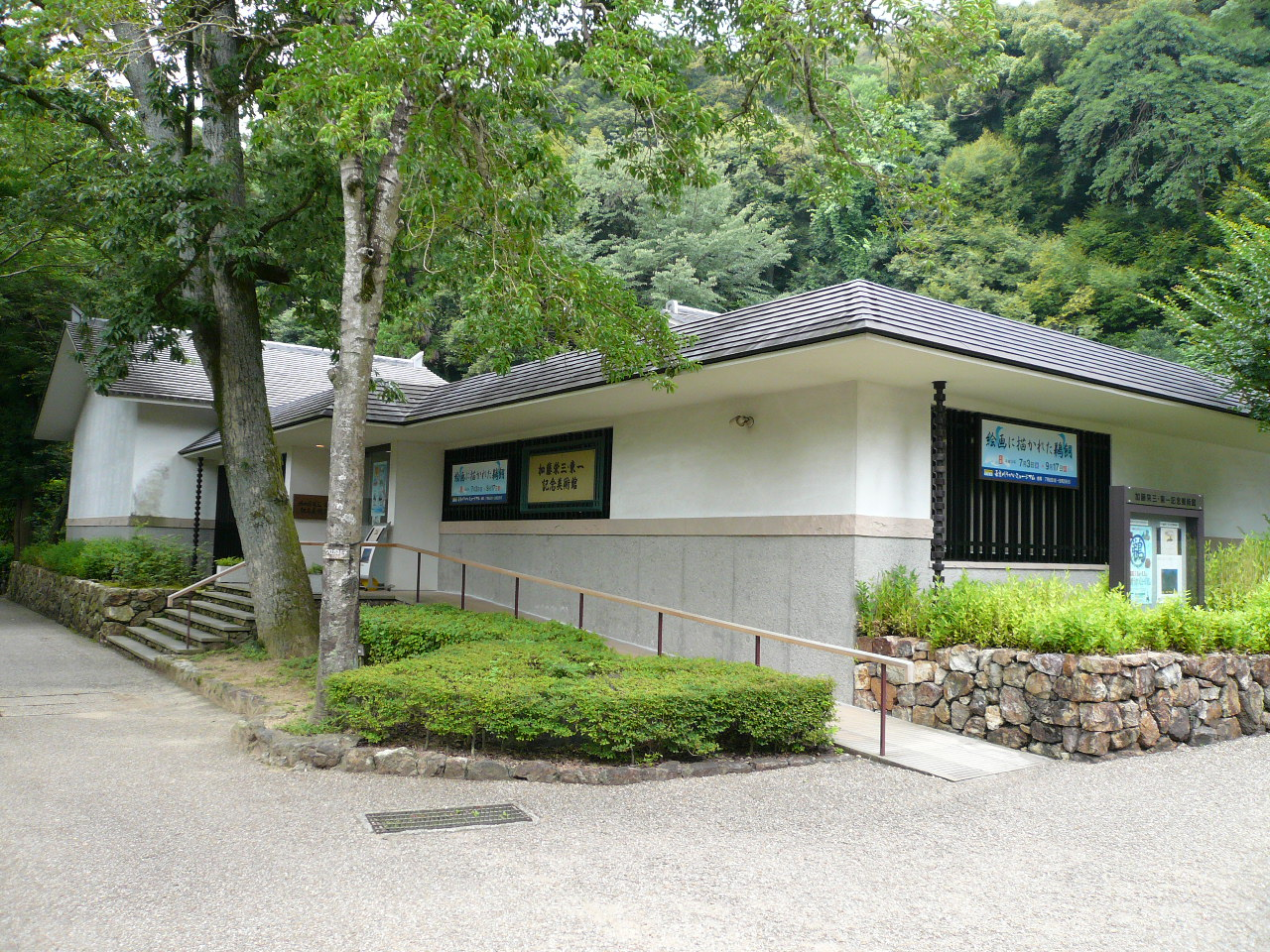
Eizō & Tōichi Katō Memorial Art Museum

- 1991 The Eizō & Tōichi Katō Memorial Art Museum was opened in Gifu.
- 1992 The "Eizō Katō: 20th Anniversary Exhibition" was opened in Tokyo.
