= Mount Kinka Ropeway =

Aerial tramway in Gifu, Japan

Coordinates: 35°26′0.1″N 136°46′39.6″E

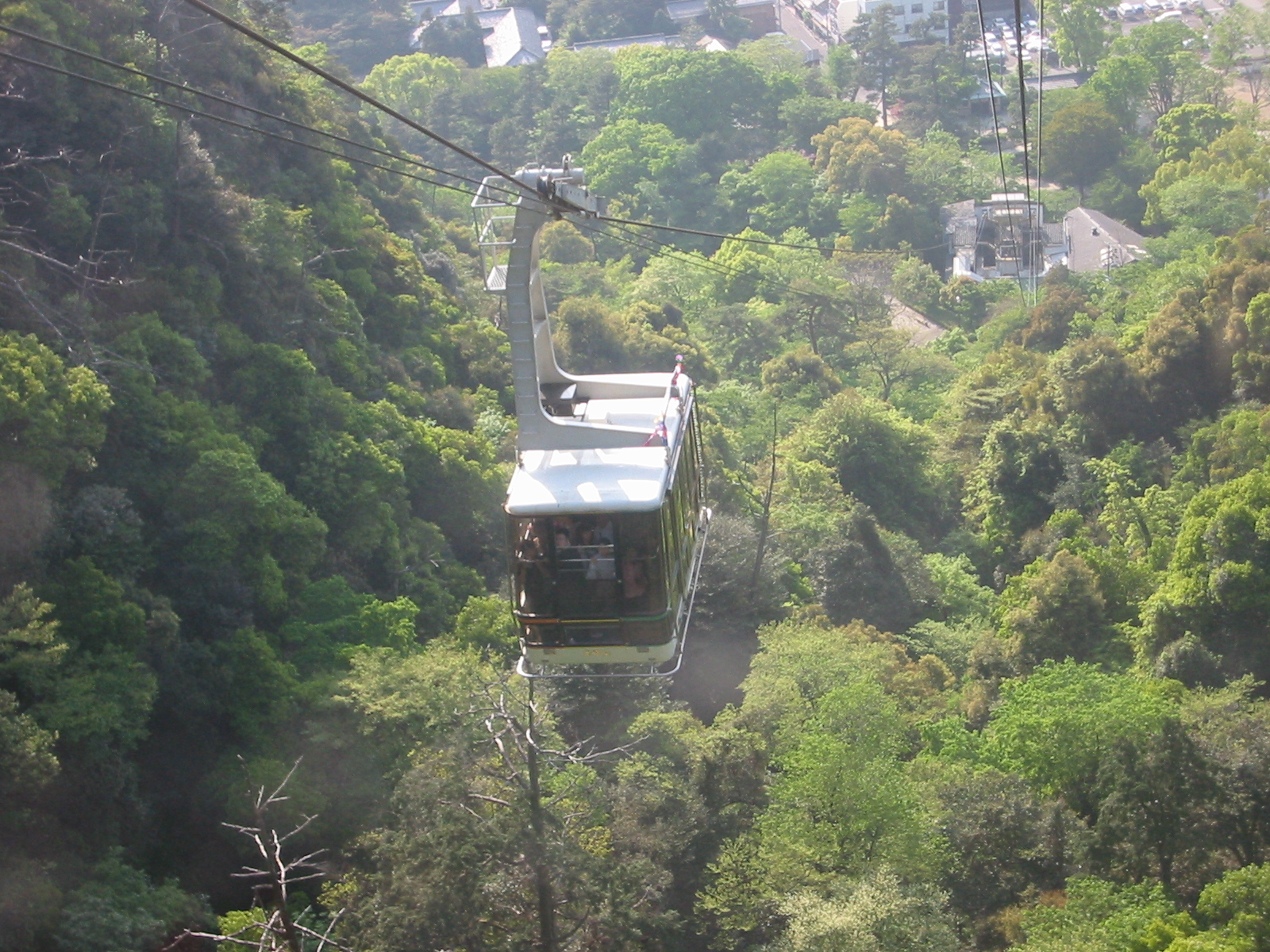
The Mt. Kinka Ropeway from the top of Mt. Kinka

The Mt. Kinka Ropeway (金華山ロープウェー, Kinkazan Rōpuwē) is a Japanese aerial lift line in Gifu, Gifu. This is the only line Gifu Kankō Ropeway (岐阜観光索道, Gifu Kankō Sakudō) operates. The company belongs to Meitetsu Group. The line, opened in 1955, climbs Mount Kinka, linking Gifu Park and Gifu Castle.

== Background ==
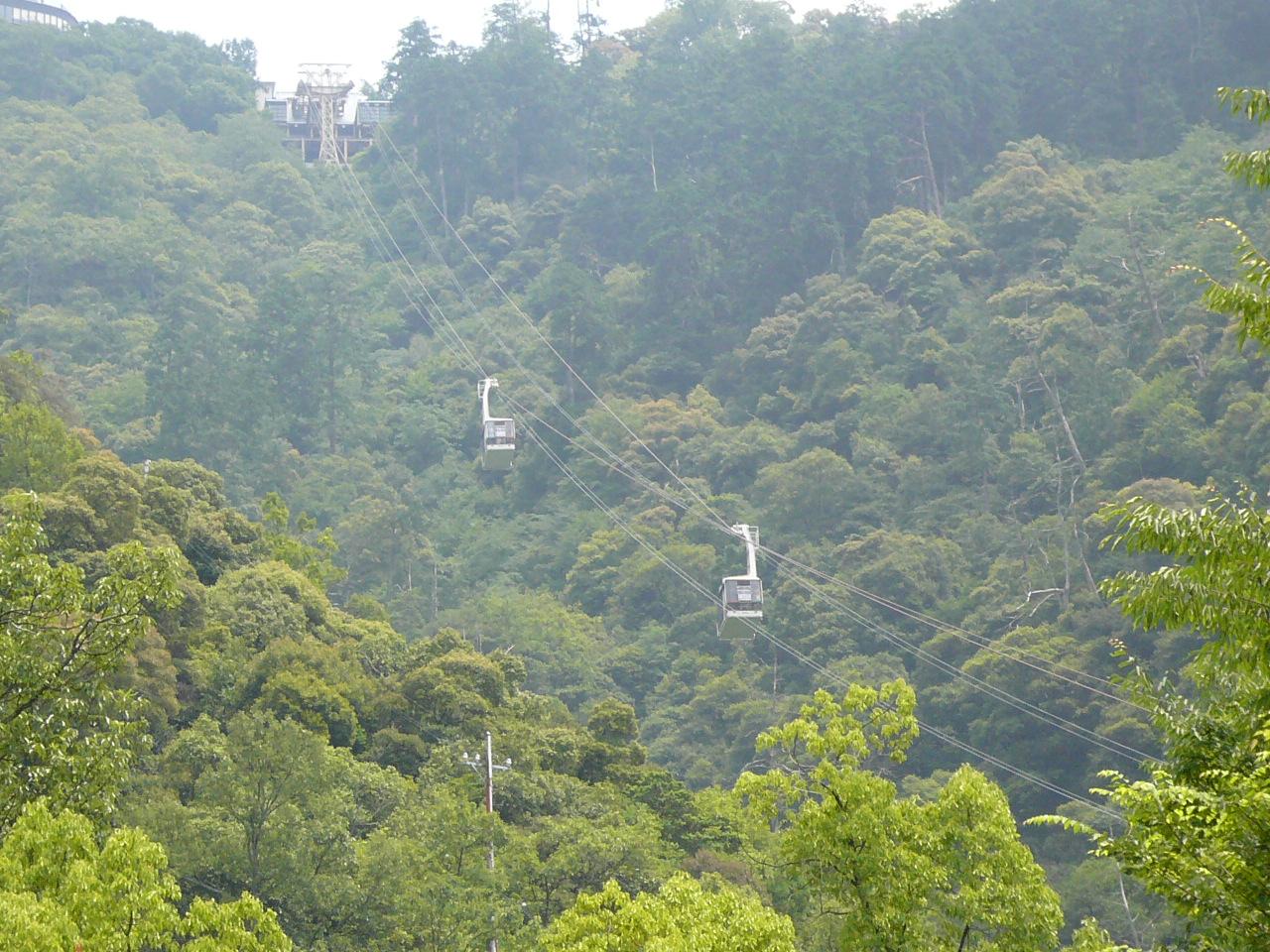
The ropeway from the base of Mt. Kinka

In addition to taking a hiking trail up Mt. Kinka, visitors can also take the Mt. Kinka Ropeway, which first opened in 1955. This ropeway enables visitors to reach the top of the mountain in less than five minutes. The hours of operation for the ropeway vary depending on the seasons throughout the year, but it is generally open from 9:00am to 6:00pm. On weekdays, it runs every 15 minutes, while on weekends and holidays, it runs every 10 minutes.

== Basic data ==
- System: Aerial tramway, 3 cables
- Distance: 599 m (1,965 ft)
- Vertical interval: 255 m (837 ft)
- Maximum gradient: 32°42′
- Operational speed: 3.6 m/s
- Passenger capacity per cabin: 46
- Stations: 2
- Time required for single ride: 3 minutes

== Fees ==
Ropeway Fare	One-way	Roundtrip
Adult (over 12 y.o.)	600yen	1050yen
Child (4-11 y.o.)	280yen	520yen

- A 10% discount for adults and 25% for children is available for groups of 30 or more.
- A 25% discount is available for adults with a school group of 30 or more.
- A 50% discount is available for those on disability welfare.

== See also ==
- List of aerial lifts in Japan
