= Gifu City Museum of History =

Museum in Gifu, Japan

Coordinates: 35.43332°N 136.772803°E

Gifu City Museum of History 岐阜市歴史博物館
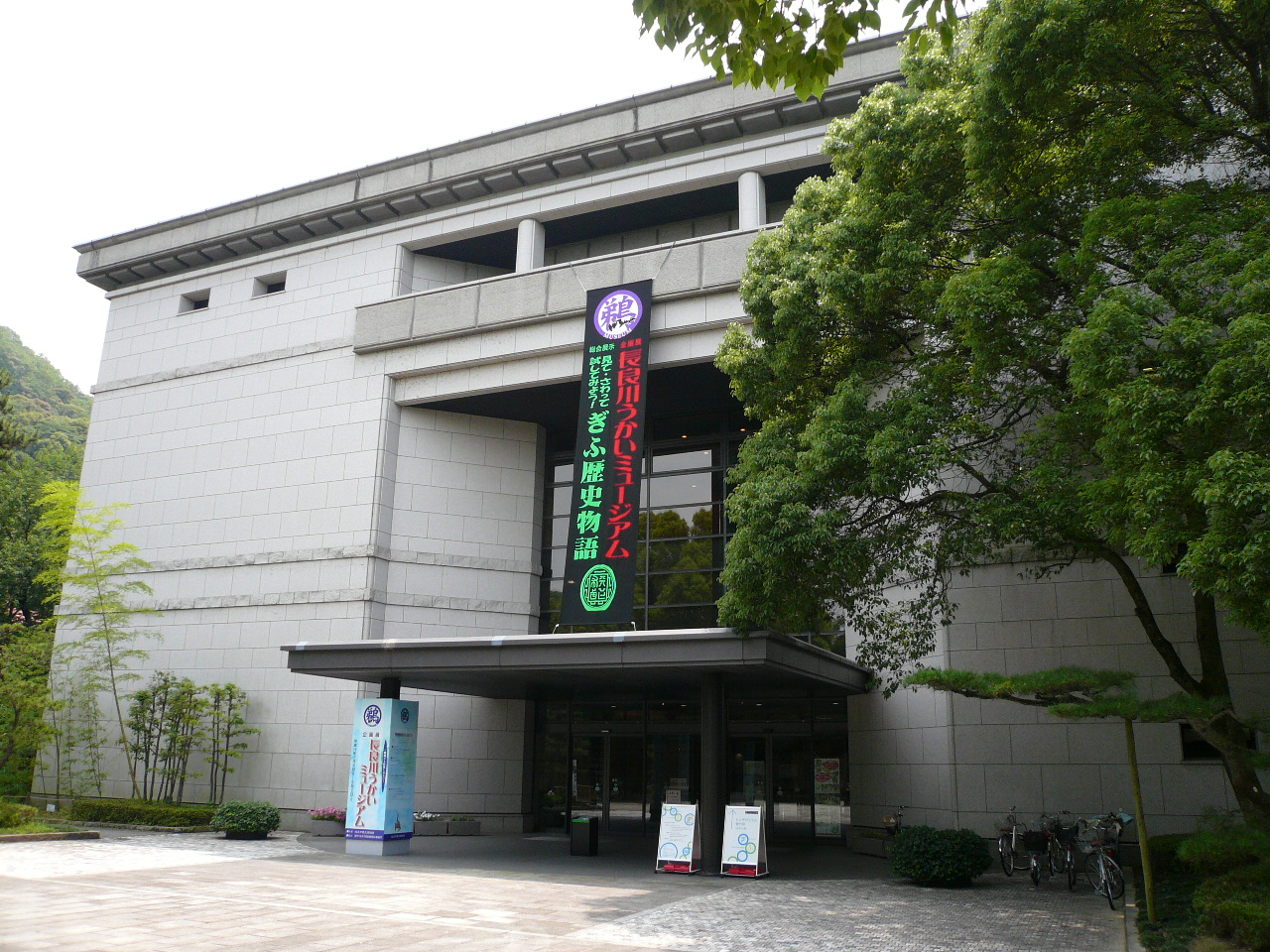
- Established: November 1985
- Location: 2-18-1 Ōmiya-chō, Gifu; Gifu Prefecture, Japan
- Public transit access: Gifu Bus
- Website: Museum of History homepage

The Gifu City Museum of History (岐阜市歴史博物館, Gifu-shi Rekishi Hakubutsukan) is a city-supported history museum located in the city of Gifu, Gifu Prefecture, Japan. Located in Gifu Park at the base of Mount Kinka, it is in the heart of Gifu City's sightseeing area.

The museum primarily focuses on the history and traditional crafts of the surrounding area and includes a recreation of a Warring States Period free market that was created by Oda Nobunaga, a leading feudal lord of the 16th century, as well as many hands-on exhibits. However, the museum often hosts special exhibitions, which cover a wide variety of themes.

== History ==
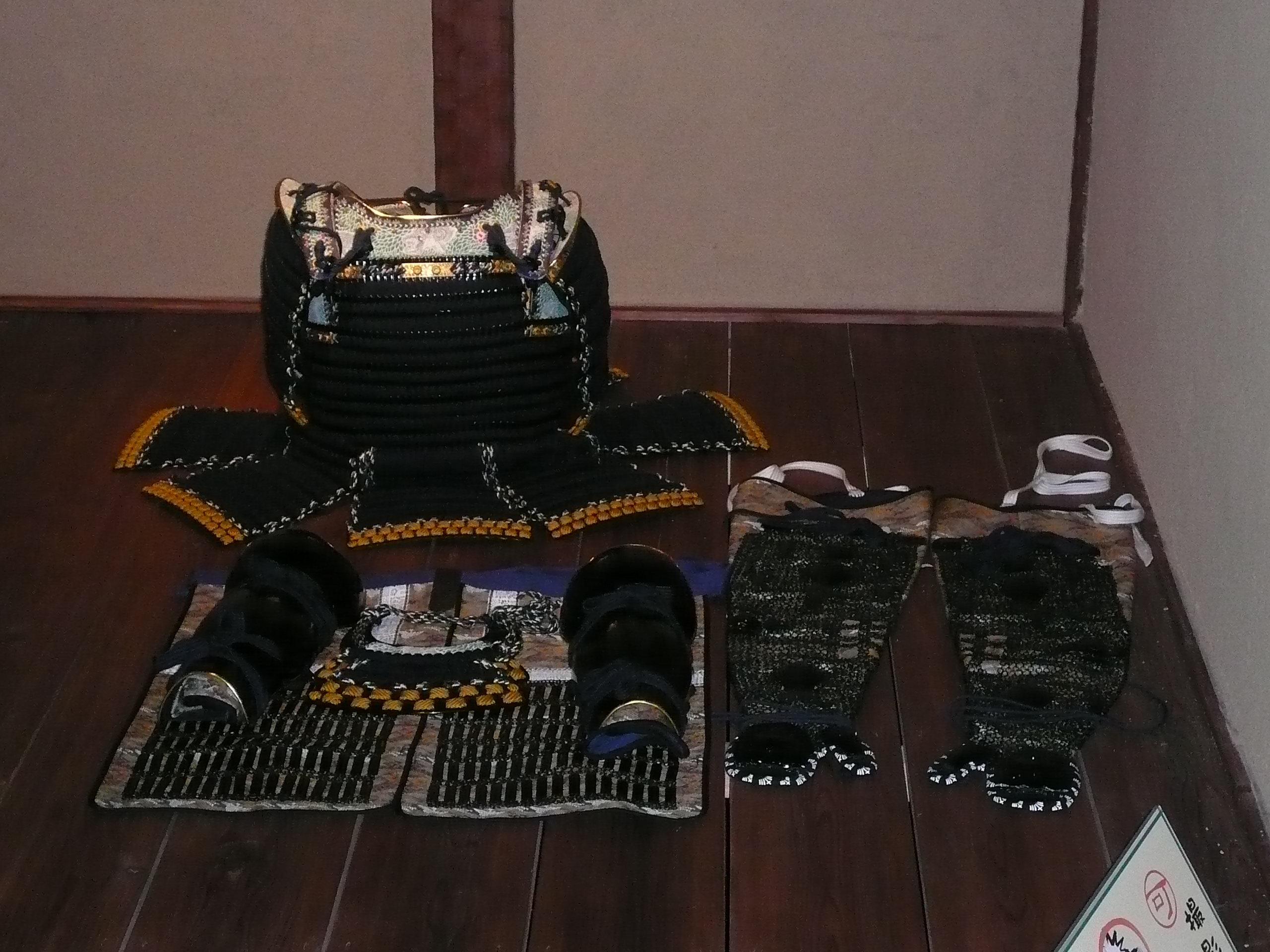
Armor on display

Planning for the museum began in 1972 as a result of an initiative by the local Social Education Committee. Construction was completed in 1985 and the museum opened in November of that year. In March 2005, after undergoing extensive renovations, the museum held a grand renewal opening, just in time for its 20th anniversary that November.

Currently, both the Eizō & Tōichi Katō Memorial Art Museum in Gifu Park and the Yanaizu Folklore Museum in Yanaizu-chō serve as branches to the museum.

== Hands-on activities ==
The history museum offers the following activities:

- Historical Gifu

The first area of the permanent exhibit is dedicated to Gifu's early history, going back to the Jōmon period. Visitors can try their hand at putting together a broken vase, making their own designs on a clay vase, ringing an ancient bell, or wearing old armor.

- Warring States period

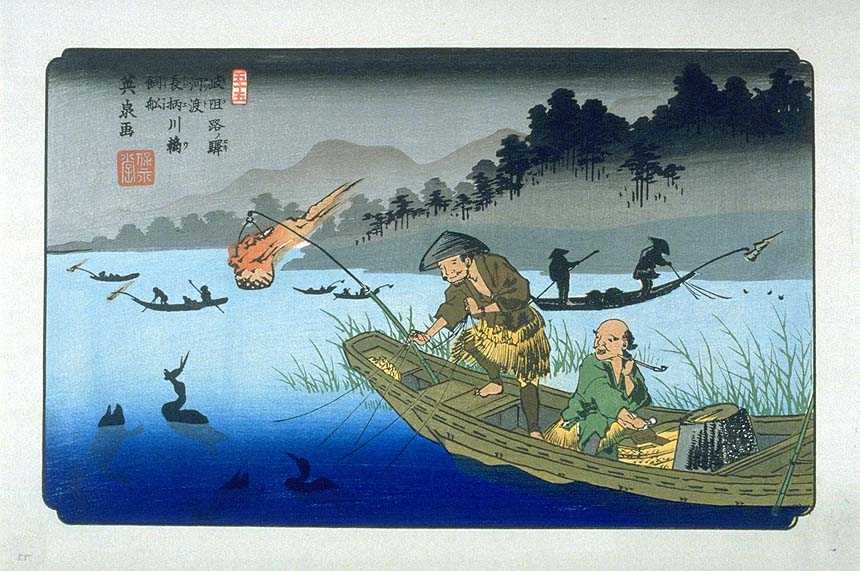
Keisai Eisen's ukiyo-e of Gōdo-juku

The second permanent area focuses on the Warring States period of Gifu's history, when Gifu received its name and first flourished. Men and women can try on period clothing, visit recreated stores and houses, have koma battles, or practice ryūgo or sugoroku.

- Modern Gifu

The last section of the permanent exhibit focuses on Gifu's more recent history. There are scent boxes that represent each of Gifu's traditional industries, musical recordings and pictorial slides from decades ago, and an opportunity for visitors to make their own ukiyo-e (see right) of Gōdo-juku, one of Gifu's two former post towns on the Nakasendō.

== Facilities information ==
- Contact

Address: 2-18-1 Ōmiya-chō, Gifu, Gifu Prefecture

- Hours of Operation

9:00am to 5:00pm (entry until 4:30pm)

- Holidays

Mondays (Tuesday, if Monday is a holiday)
Day after national holidays
Dec. 29 to Jan. 3

- Entrance Fee

Permanent Exhibit	Individual Rate	Group Rate
Adult	300 yen	240 yen
Child	150 yen	90 yen

- Group discounts are available to parties of 20 or larger.
- Those over 70 years of age are allowed free admission.
- Special exhibit fees are separate.

== Access ==
From JR Gifu Station (Bus Platform 11) or Meitetsu Gifu Station (Bus Platform 4), board any bus operated by Gifu Bus heading towards Nagara. Get off the bus at "Gifu Kōen, Rekishi Hakubutsukan-mae," approximately 15 minutes from the train stations.
