= Gifu Bus =

Public transportation company in Japan

Gifubus Co., Ltd.

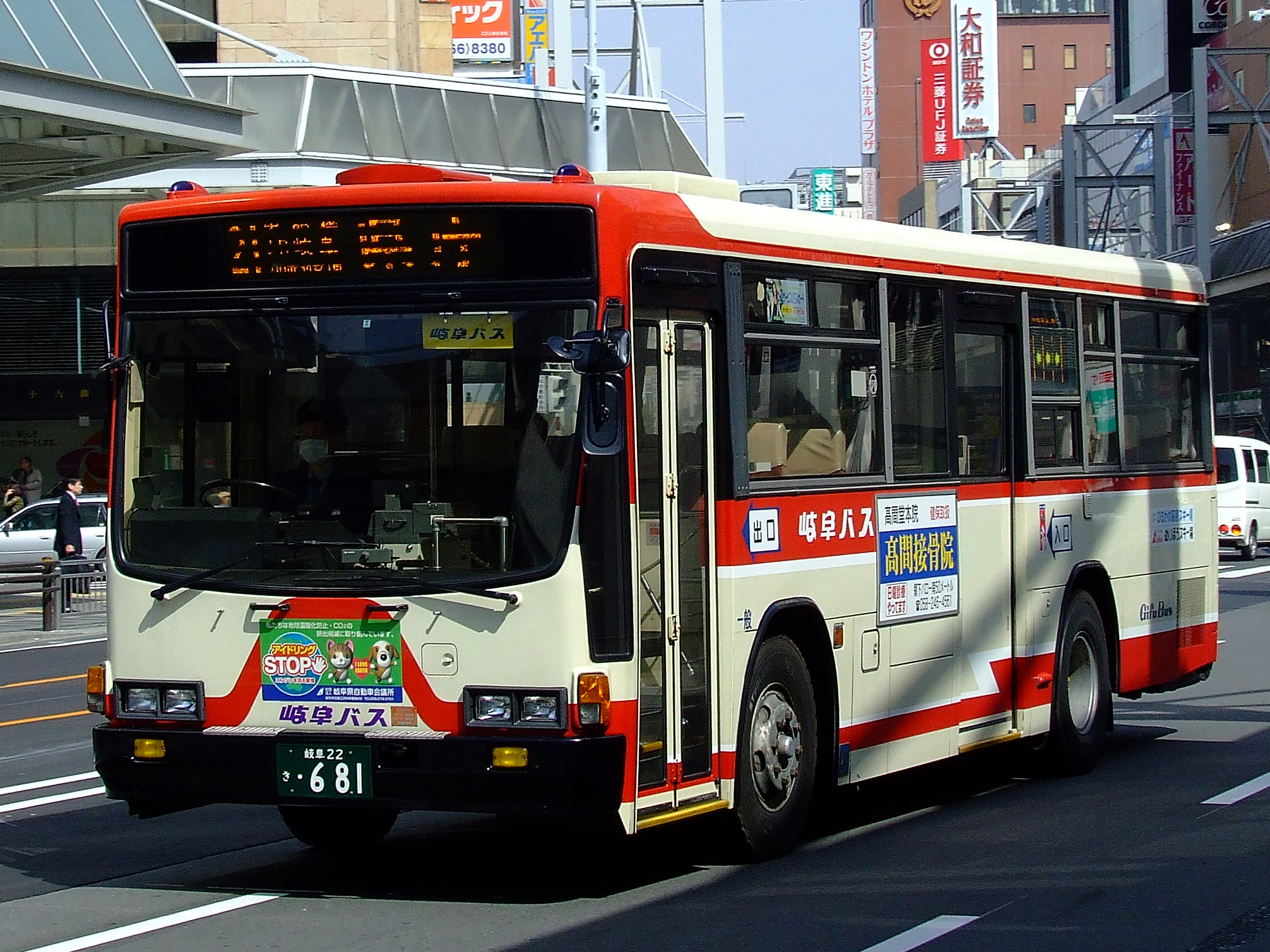
- Native name: 岐阜乗合自動車
- Company type: Kabushiki gaisha
- Industry: Public transportation
- Founded: April 21, 1943
- Headquarters: Gifu, Gifu Prefecture, Japan
- Area served: Gifu Prefecture
- Revenue: 5.82 billion yen (2005)
- Total assets: 12.67 billion yen (2005)
- Number of employees: 597 (2024)
- Parent: Meitetsu
- Subsidiaries: Kayo Autotech Co., Ltd.
- Website: www.gifubus.co.jp

Gifu Bus (岐阜乗合自動車, Gifu Noriai Jidōsha) is a public transportation company based in Gifu, Gifu Prefecture, Japan. It is a subsidiary of Meitetsu (Nagoya Railroad) and primarily operates within Gifu Prefecture. Some of its public transportation routes within the city of Gifu were handed over by Meitetsu Bus on October 1, 2004. On April 1, 2005, it took over operations of public bus routes formerly run by the city. At the same time, it also replaced bus lines in nearby cities and began operating the Gifu Community Bus.

== Branch offices ==
Gifu Bus operates 11 offices in the area, three of which are located within the city of Gifu. The other locations within Gifu Prefecture include Yamagata, Mino, Seki, Gujō, Kakamigahara and Ginan. The final location is in Nishiharu, in the neighboring Aichi Prefecture.

Drivers' nameplates indicate the branch to which they belong, so some nameplates indicate branch offices that have been closed, moved or merged and are not included in the list above.

== Fares ==
Gifu Bus' local routes are divided into regions and fares vary based on the distance traveled between the boarding and unboarding locations. The base fare is 200 yen, though reduced fares are available for children and the elderly. Riders can take a numbered ticket when boarding the bus, with their fare indicated on a board at the front of the bus as they get off.

Until March 31, 2007, riders were able to use prepaid fare cards to pay fares. These cards were available in various denominations and offered riders a bonus of 5–15% depending on the denomination purchased. These prepaid cards were replaced by ayuca smart cards, which went on sale on December 1, 2006. Like the prepaid cards, these smart cards replaced cash and gave bonuses when stored fare was added. Both systems were used simultaneously for four months until the prepaid cards were stopped.

Gifu Bus began accepting Meitetsu's manaca and other Nationwide Mutual Usage Service cards on March 2, 2024. ayuca sales ended on February 15, 2026, superseded by manaca. Gifu Bus buses will stop accepting ayuca on January 1, 2027.

== Vehicles ==
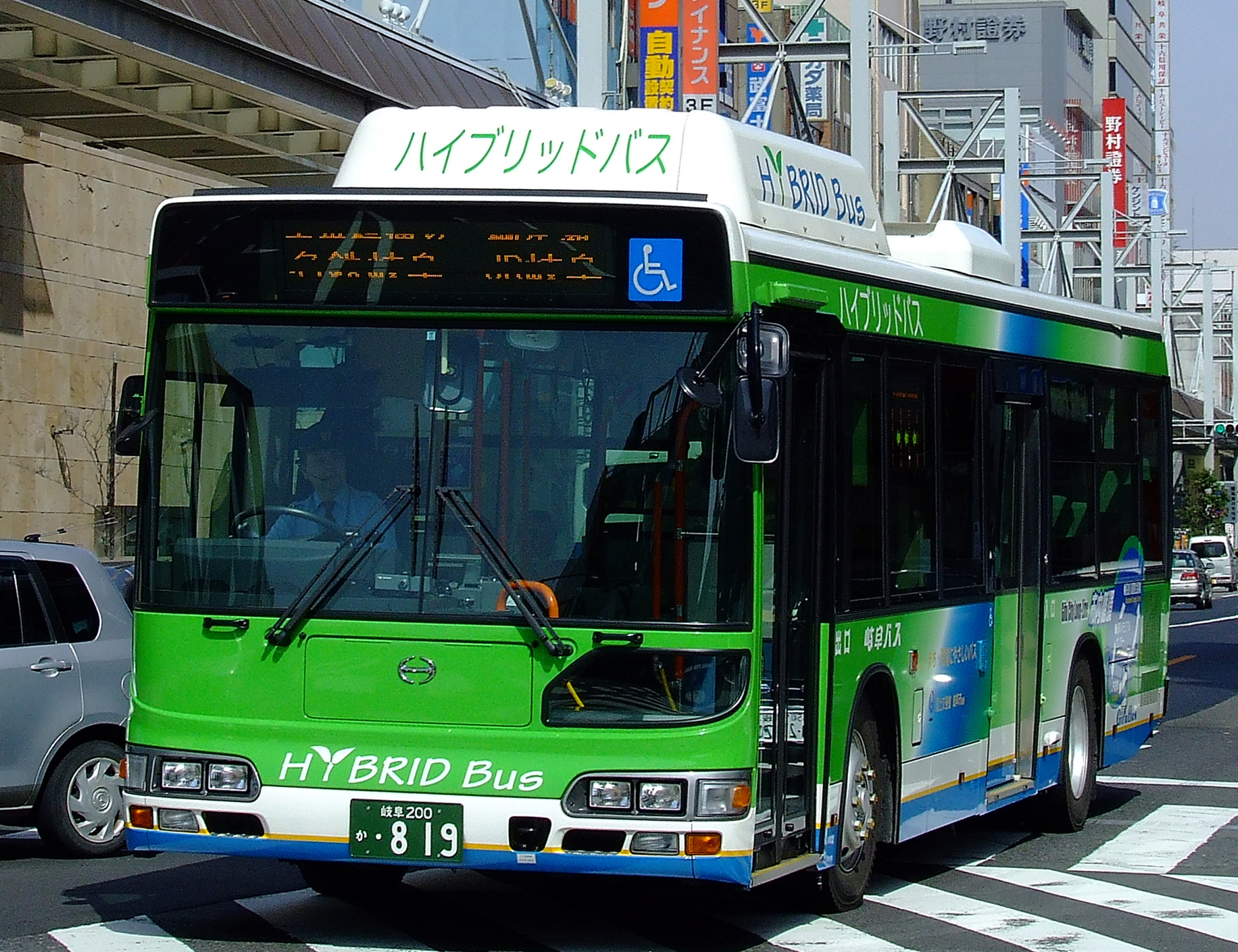
Hino Motors hybrid bus used by Gifu Bus

The majority of the buses in use were made by Mitsubishi Fuso Truck and Bus Corporation, because those were the buses used by Nagoya Railroad when the routes began. However, the buses run by Gifu were models made by either Isuzu or Nissan Diesel, so there is some variety among bus types. Additionally, some buses were purchased from Kawasaki Heavy Industries many years ago; these buses have been refurbished and are still in use.

In 2005, Gifu Bus began using non-step buses from Hino Motors to accommodate the aging population of the area. The company also uses hybrid buses made by Mitsubishi that were first used in Expo 2005 in neighboring Aichi Prefecture; most of these buses are operated by the Yanagase Branch Office. Hino Motors provided the hybrid buses used exclusively on the Shinai Loop Line.

The sightseeing and highway buses generally use Mitsubishi buses, but there are also a few made by Mercedes-Benz. Some of the larger model buses were built by the Belgian company Van Hool.

== Routes ==
The company's bus routes are listed below, separated by the branch office which manages them. (Note: Not all branch offices run bus lines.)

Gifu Branch Office

- Gifu City Loop Line
- Sagiyama Kenchō Line
- Shōrai Kanō Line
- Chūsetsu Nagara Line
- Ginanchō Line
- Kidaijidanchi Line
- Iwado Irifune Line
- Malera Chūsetsu Line
- Aeon Kakamigahara Line
- Yana Bus
- Ii Bus (Community Bus)

Gifu West Branch Office

- Akanabe Mitahora Line
- Obusa Sunomata Line
- Gifu Shōtoku Gakuendai Line
- Kagashima Ichihashi Line
- Mieji Hozumi Line
- Hozumi Rio-World Line
- Kitagata Hozumi Line

Kakigase Branch Office

- Kurono Line
- Gifu Daigaku, Byōin Line
- Branch of Gifu Daigaku, Byōin Line

- Motosu Line
- Ijira Line
- Kakebora Hōju Line

- Kanō Shima Line
- Kanō Minami Line
- Sogaya Line
- Kitagata Enkyōji Line
- Saigō Line
- Masada Chūsetsu Line
- Ōno Shinsei Kitagata Line
- Gifu Kōsen Line
- Ōno Kitakō Line
- Kenchō Gidai line
- Kagashimaōhashi Line
- Ōno Hozumi Line

Mino Branch Office

- Kano Danchi Line
- Takami Line
- Makitani Line
- Horado Seki Line
- Nagoya Line ^{H}
- Takaoka Himi Line ^{H}

Takatomi Branch Office

- Gifu Takatomi Line
- Gihoku Line
- Itadori Line
- Gifu Joshidai Line
- Mitahora Line

Seki Branch Office

- Gifu Kaminoho Line
- Seki Mugi Line
- Takano Line
- Horado Seki Line
- Seki Unuma Line

Hachiman Branch Office

(Gifu Bus Community Hachiman Co., Ltd.)

- Hachiman Line
- Wara Line
- Meihō Line
- Shōkawa Hachiman Line
- Hachiman Line ^{H}
- Shirakawa-gō ^{H}
- Hachiman Nagoya Line ^{H}

Kakamigahara Branch Office

(Gifu Bus Community Co., Ltd.)

- Ōbora Danchi Line
- Ozaki Danchi Line
- Senbiki Taiheidai Town Line
- Kawashima Maewatari Line
- Hino Ichihashi Line
- Kurachi Line
- Gifu Kakamigahara Line
- Kakamigahara Tōbu Line
- VR Techno Line
- Unuma Ryokuen Danchi Line
- Little World Line
- Meiji-mura Line
- Chōja-machi Danchi Junkan Line

^{H}Indicates highway lines

=== Designations ===
Each route listed above (other than the Gifu City Loop Line, the Yana Bus, the Community Bus, the School bus as Ōno Kitakō and Kagashima Ōhashi Line, and the Highway Lines) are designated with both a letter and a two-digit number. All routes run through Meitetsu Gifu Station along eight main trunks, so each line is divided into one of eight groups. The numbering indicates how far from Meitetsu Gifu Station the final destination is (e.g. a bus numbered "80" would travel further than a bus numbered "50"). The eight letters and their respective areas are listed below.

- N: for/from Nagara Bridge Avenue (ex. North/Northwest of Gifu City) Area
- K: for/from Kinka Bridge Avenue (ex. North/Northwest of Gifu City) Area
- C: for/from Chūsetsu Bridge Avenue (ex. Gifu Univ., Kurono) Area
- O: for/from Ōnawaba Bridge Avenue (ex. Kitagata, Ōno) Area
- G: for/from Gōdo Bridge Avenue (ex. Kagashima, Mizuho City) Area
- W: for/from West Kanō (ex. Kanō Shinhonmachi, Sunomata) area
- E: for/from East Kanō (ex. Kanō Sakuramichi, Pref. Office, Yanaizu) area
- B: for/from Bairin Park (ex. Kitaishiki) area

=== Late night routes ===
Three of the routes have a few buses that run beyond normal operating hours, allowing commuters and other people to catch a late bus home. The charge for these buses is twice the normal fare and they do not run on Saturdays, Sundays or holidays.

- Kurono Line (Kakigase Branch Office)
- Takatomi Line (Takatomi Branch Office)
- Ōbora Danchi Line (Kakamigahara Branch Office)

=== School routes ===
Gifu Bus operates shuttle buses to two local universities, Asahi University and Gifu University. The route to Asahi University is jointly operated by the Gifu, Gifu West, and Kakigase branch offices. The Gifu University route is part of the Kenchō Gidai Line and is run by the Kakigase Branch Office.
