= Hokke-ji (disambiguation) =

Hokke-ji (法華寺, Hokke-ji) is the name of various Buddhist temples throughout Japan China and Taiwan.

- Hokke-ji, located in Nara, Nara Prefecture
- Hokke-ji, located in Gifu, Gifu Prefecture
- Hokke-ji, located in Miharu, Fukushima Prefecture
- Fahua-si, located in Dongcheng, Beijing, China.
- Fahua-si, located in Wanhua, Taipei, Taiwan.

== See also ==
- Hōkai-ji, a temple in Kamakura
