= Hokke =

Hokke can refer to:

- Hokke, a cadet branch of the Japanese Fujiwara family
- The fish Okhotsk atka mackerel

For temples, see Hokke-ji (disambiguation).
