= Matsuo Pond =

Pond in Gifu, Japan

Coordinates: 35°27′22″N 136°48′11″E

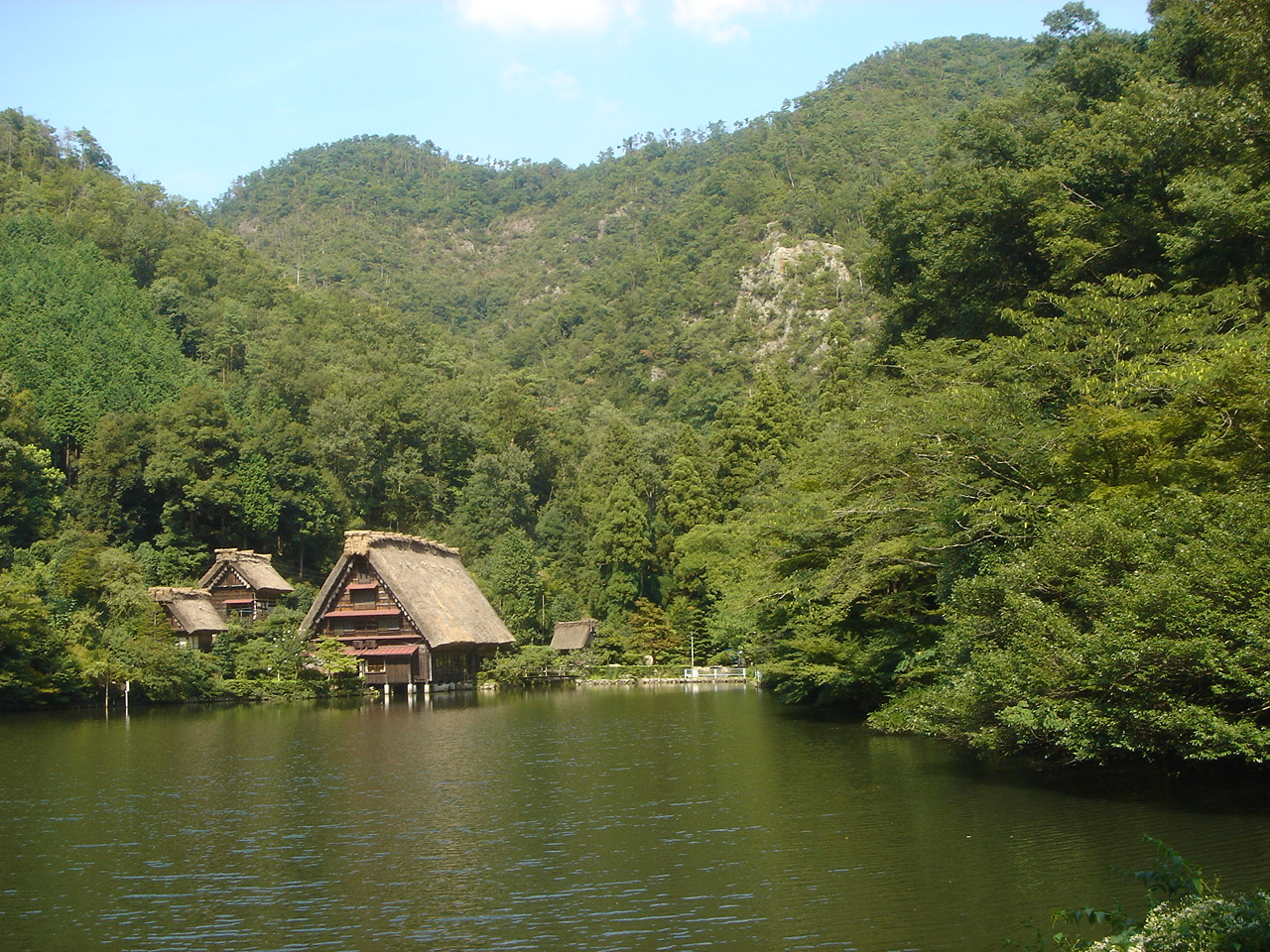
Lake Matsuo and the Iwafune-sō

Matsuo Pond (松尾池, Matsuo-ike) is a pond in Gifu, Gifu Prefecture, Japan. It is located at the southern base of Mount Dodo, the city's tallest mountain. The area around the lake is known as the Hagi Falls Nature Park (萩の滝自然公園 Hagi-no-taki Shizen Kōen). The park is very popular in the fall when the leaves are changing color.

== History ==
In 1966, the architects of the gasshō-zukuri houses in Shirakawa in the northern part of the prefecture were brought to Matsuo Pond to construct the Iwafune-sō (岩舟荘).
