= Sugimoto-dera =

Buddhist temple in Kamakura, Japan

- 杉本寺
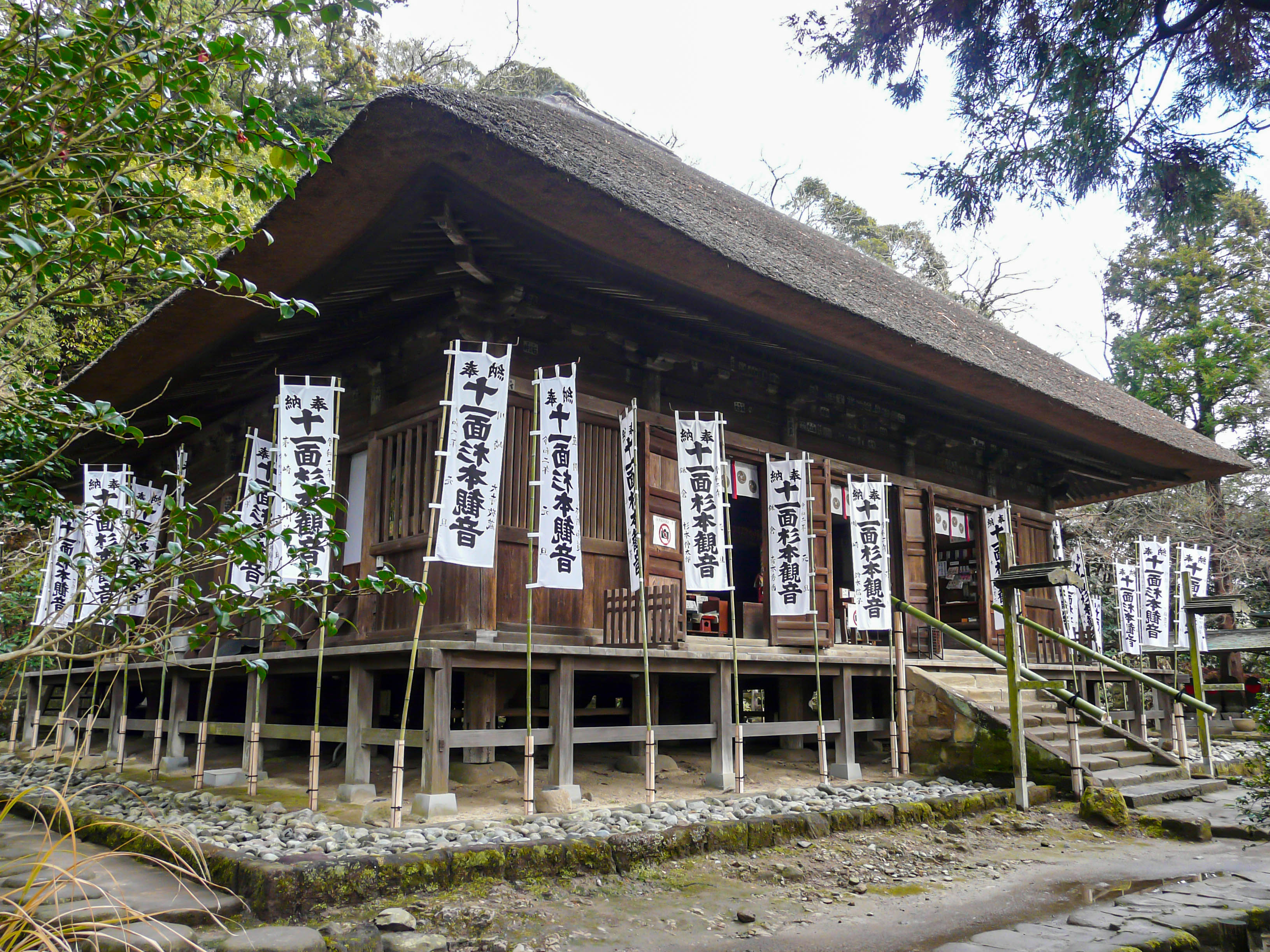
- Kannon-do (Hondo)

- Location within Kanagawa Prefecture Location within Japan

Religion
- Affiliation: Buddhist
- Deity: Jūichimen Kannon Bosatsu
- Rite: Tendai
- Status: functional

Location
- Location: 903 Nikaidō, Kamakura-shi, Kanagawa-ken 248-0002
- Country: Japan
- Coordinates: 35°19′21.3″N 139°34′2.8″E

Architecture
- Founder: c.Gyōki
- Completed: c.734

Website
- Official website
- National Important Cultural Property

Sugimoto-dera (杉本寺) is a Buddhist temple located in the city of Kamakura, Kanagawa Prefecture, Japan. The temple's full name is Taizō-zan Kannon-in Sugimoto-dera (大蔵山観音院杉本寺). It is one of the oldest temples in Kamakura and, together with Hōkai-ji, the only one of the Tendai denomination. The temple is Number one of the Bandō Sanjūsankasho pilgrimage circuit. Two of the three statues of Jūichimen Kannon Bosatsu it enshrines are Important Cultural Properties. Sugimoto-dera is nicknamed Geba Kannon ("Dismount Kannon"), because horsemen never failed to dismount from their steeds when they passed by. (According to a different version of the legend, non-believers always fall from their horse when passing in front of the temple.) The temple is a branch temple (末寺, matsuji) of Hōkai-ji.

== Overview ==
The temple’s legend states that in the 8th century Gyōki (668–749) was crossing the Kantō region when he saw Kamakura from Mount Taizō (the Taizōzan in the temple's name) and decided to leave there a statue of the bodhisattva Kannon. He then carved and enshrined it himself. Later in 734, Emperor Shōmu was told by the bodhisvatta herself to build here a temple (the Hondō). The emperor ordered his minister, the Sadaijin Fujiwara no Fusasaki (681 – 737) to fulfill this order.

Another legend holds that it was Empress Kōmyō (701–760) rather than Emperor Shōmu who instructed Fujiwara no Fusasaki and Gyōki to build the temple, with a statue of Jūichimen Kannon as the main object of worship. The temple is therefore considered to be the oldest of Kamakura's temples, predating the Kamakura shogunate by half a millennium.

In 851, the temple was visited by Ennin (794–864), who made a new Jūichimen Kannon statue and gave it to the temple. Again in 985, cloistered Emperor Kazan (968–1008) told the priest Eshin Sōzu Genshin (942–1017) to carve a third statue of Jūichimen Kannon and enshrine it in the temple.

One evening in 1189 a fire destroyed the entire temple, but the temple's bettō, a man called Jōdai-bō, jumped into the fire and rescued the three statues, laying them under a large cryptomeria tree. From this episode stems the present name of the temple, “Sugimoto Kannon”, which literally means "Under the cryptomeria tree". The rescue was deemed miraculous, and greatly increased the temple's reputation and the number of its pilgrims. The story was later further embellished claiming that the statues repaired under the tree unaided, and simply were found under the tree.

Historical accounts of the temple are rare, remaining most of its past largely unknown. Sugimoto-dera certainly predates the Kamakura period (1185–1333) and is therefore, if not the oldest, among the oldest temples in Kamakura. The Azuma Kagami calls it "Ōkura Kannon-dō”, or "Ōkura Kannon Hall", from the name of the area where it is located. The temple was visited in 1191 by Shōgun Minamoto no Yoritomo, who ordered extensive repairs. At that time, he is said to have donated the Juichimen Kannon statue in the front of the sanctuary, as the three honzon images were made into hibutsu hidden images.

Minamoto no Yoritomo and his son, Minamoto no Sanetomo were instrumental in creating the Bandō Sanjūsankasho, a series of 33 temples in eastern Japan sacred to Kannon, and designated this temple to be the starting point of the pilgrimage circuit.

The temple survived the fall of the Kamakura shogunate in the Battle of Kamakura, but in the early years of the Nanboku-chō period was fortified by Shiba Ienaga, a military commander serving Ashikaga Takauji. However, he committed suicide at the temple after being attacked by Kitabatake Akiie, a supporter of the Southern Court, and more than 300 samurai lost their lives. The many small gorintō (stone stupas) to the right of the main hall were laid there in memory of those who fell on that occasion.

The history of the temple during the Muromachi period is not known.

The three sitting statues of Jūichimen Kannon that the Hondo enshrines are the temple's main object of worship. The statue on the left is supposedly the one Gyōki made, but it appears to belong rather to the late Heian period (from 794 to 1185). In spite of its dubious attribution, the statue is a Kamakura city Important Cultural Asset. The one in the middle is the statue said to have been made by Ennin, which also seems to go back only to the late Heian period and is a national Important Cultural Property. The one on the right is the statue traditionally attributed to Genshin, which has been dated to the middle of the Kamakura period and is far too young to really be by him. This work too is a national Important Cultural Property. Religious tradition notwithstanding, none of the statues seems therefore to be attributable to its supposed author.

Finally, the two warriors at the Niō gate (the Niōmon, see photo), are attributed by the temple to famous sculptor Unkei, but the claim is not supported by any evidence.

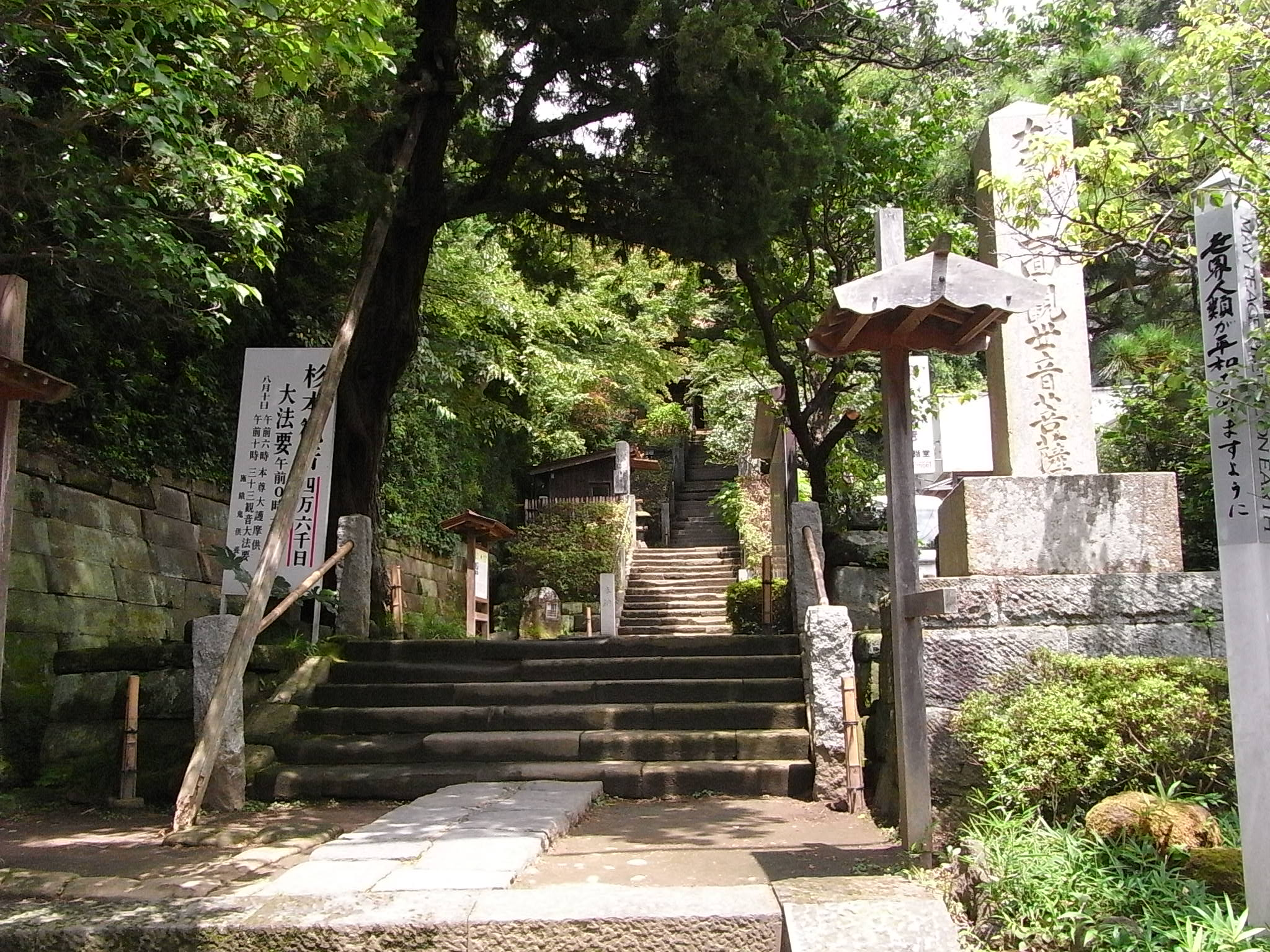
Approach

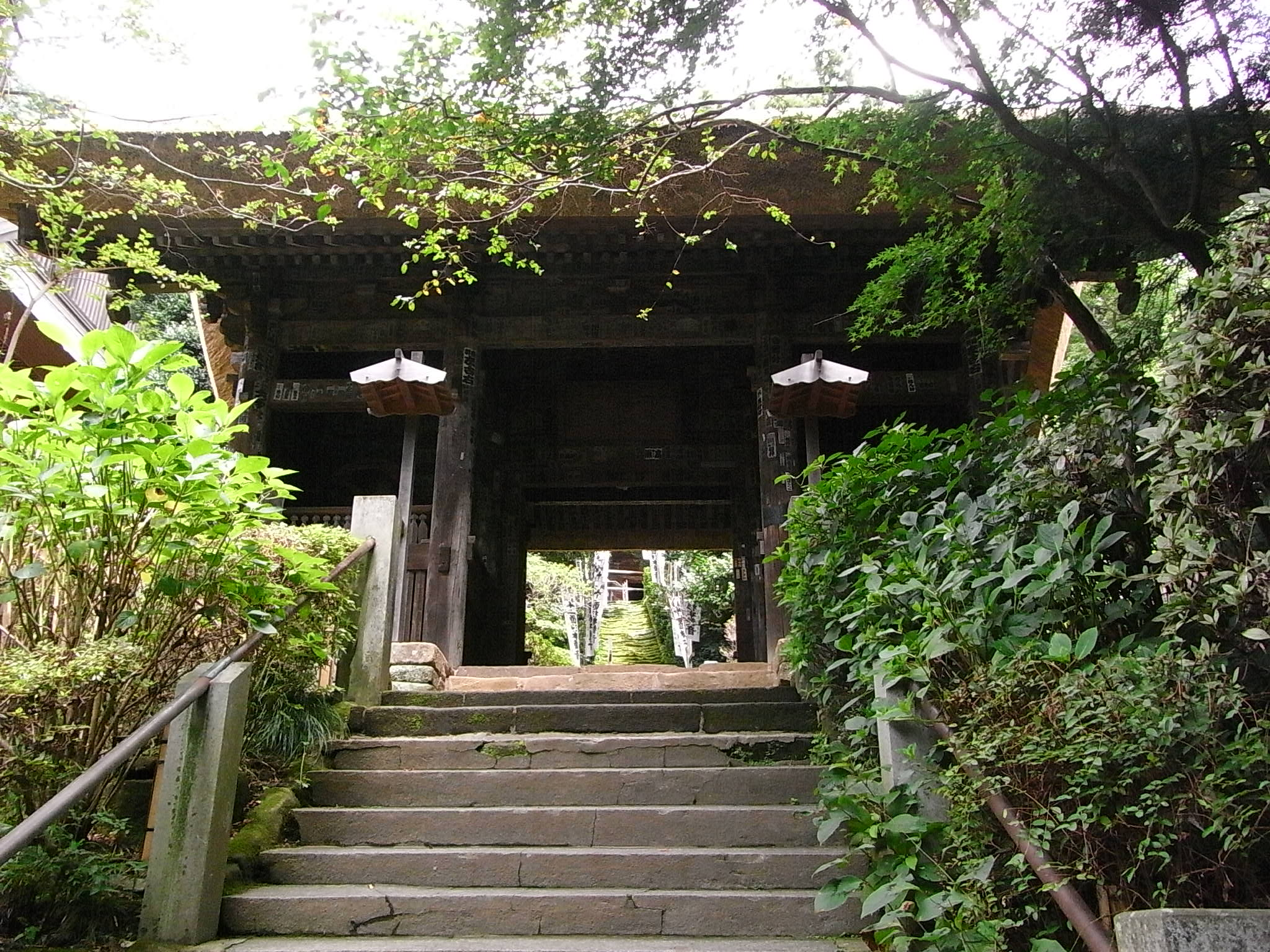
Niōmon

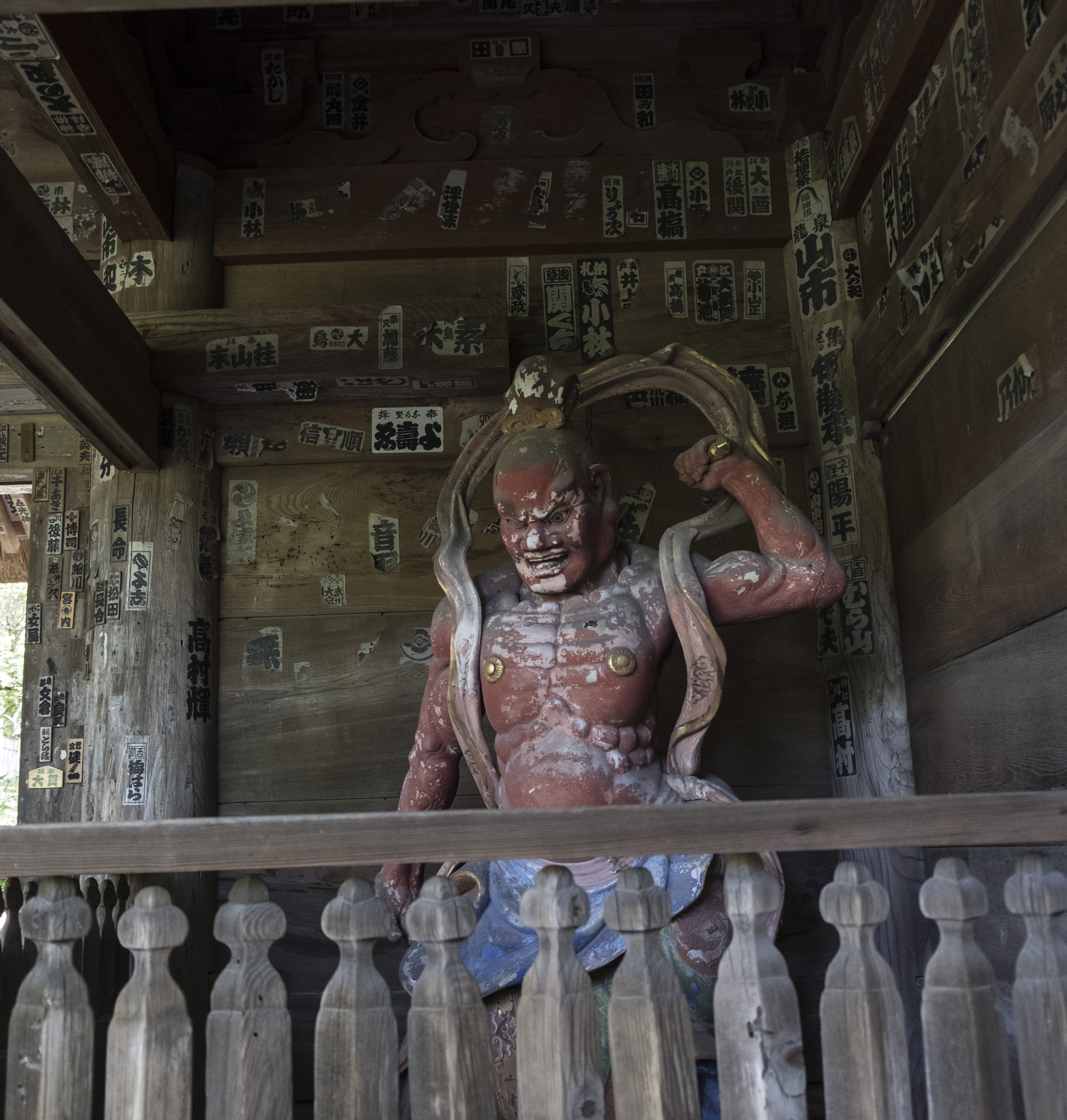
Niō statue

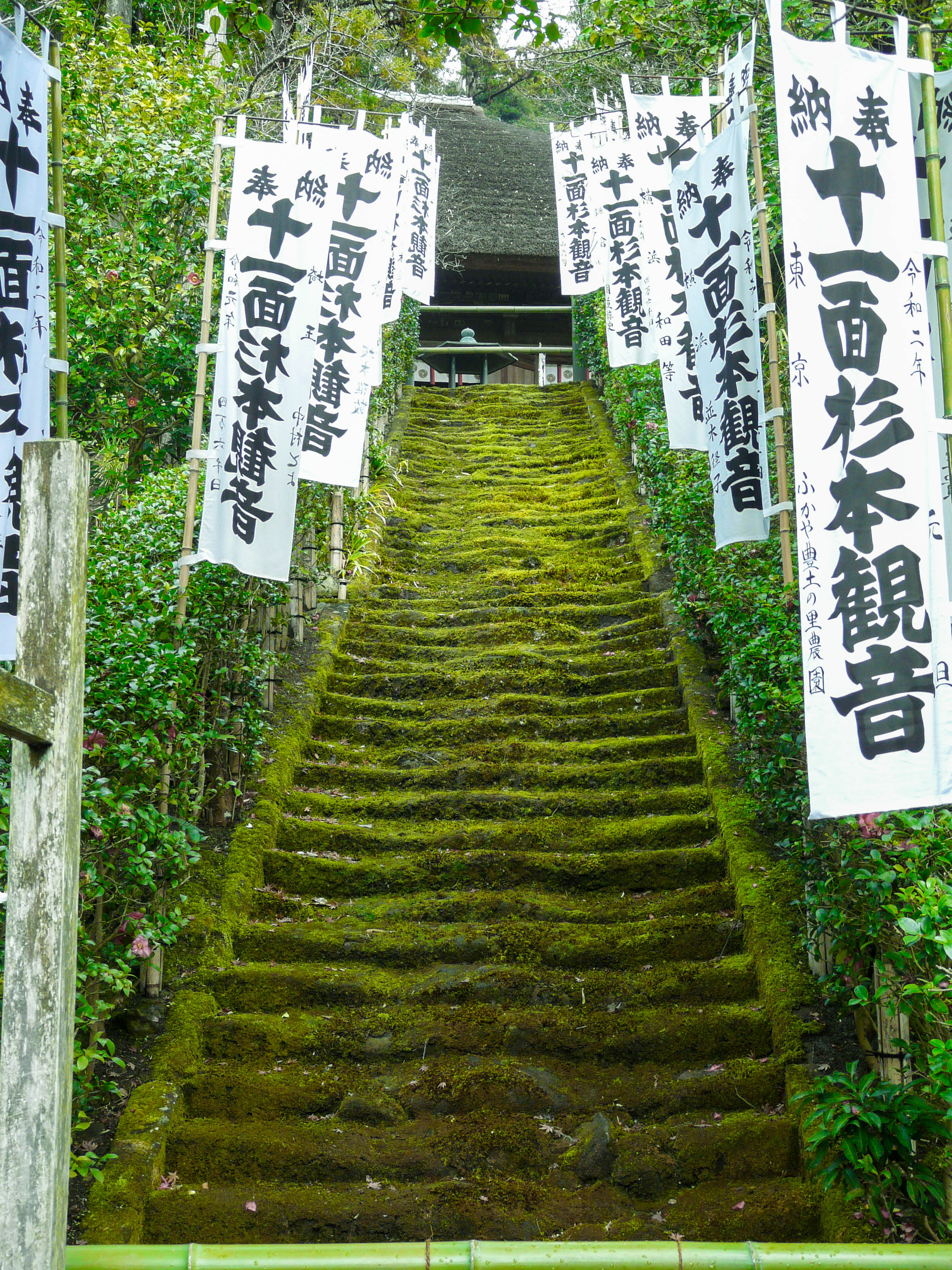
Moss cover stairs

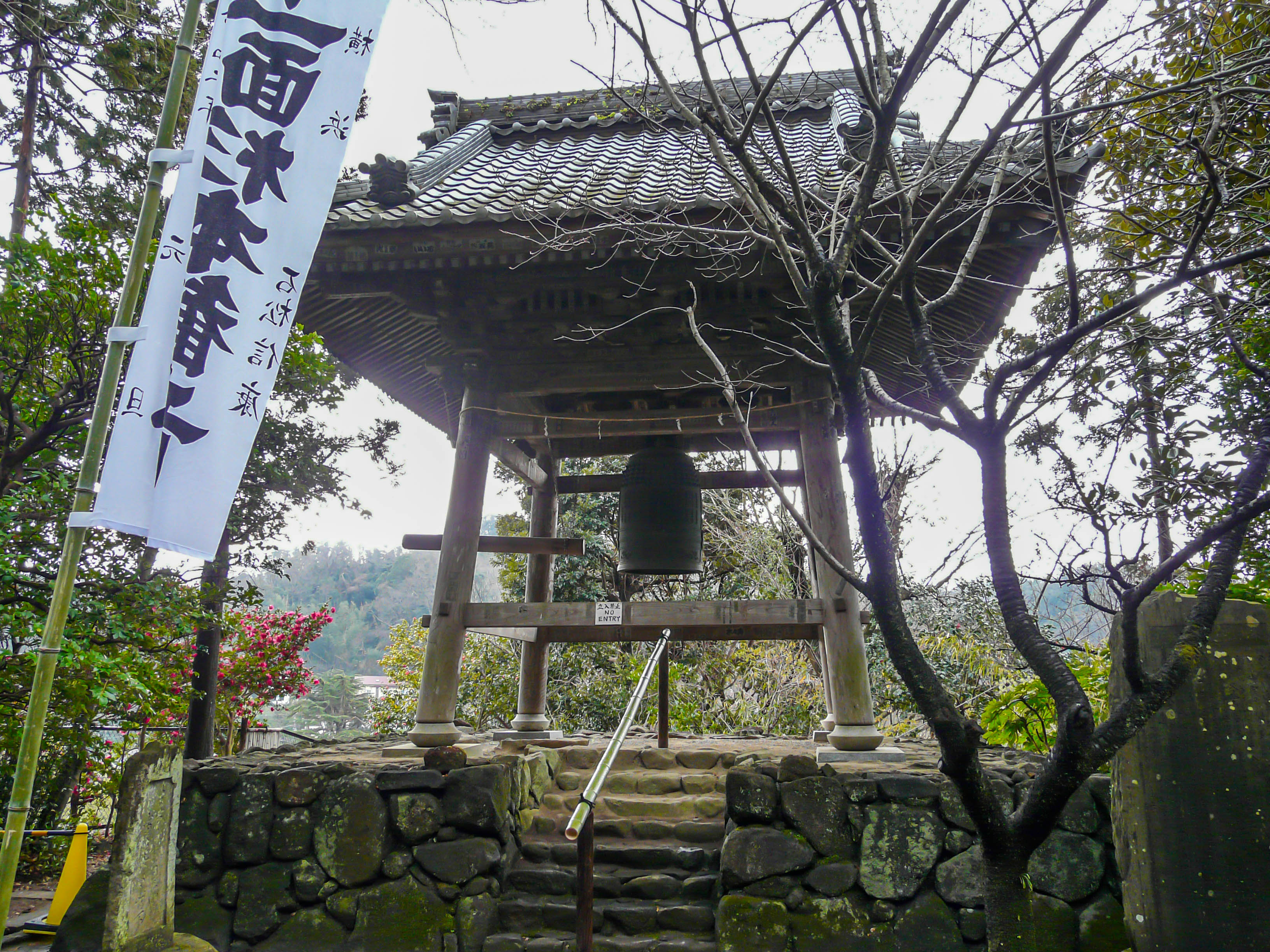
Shoro

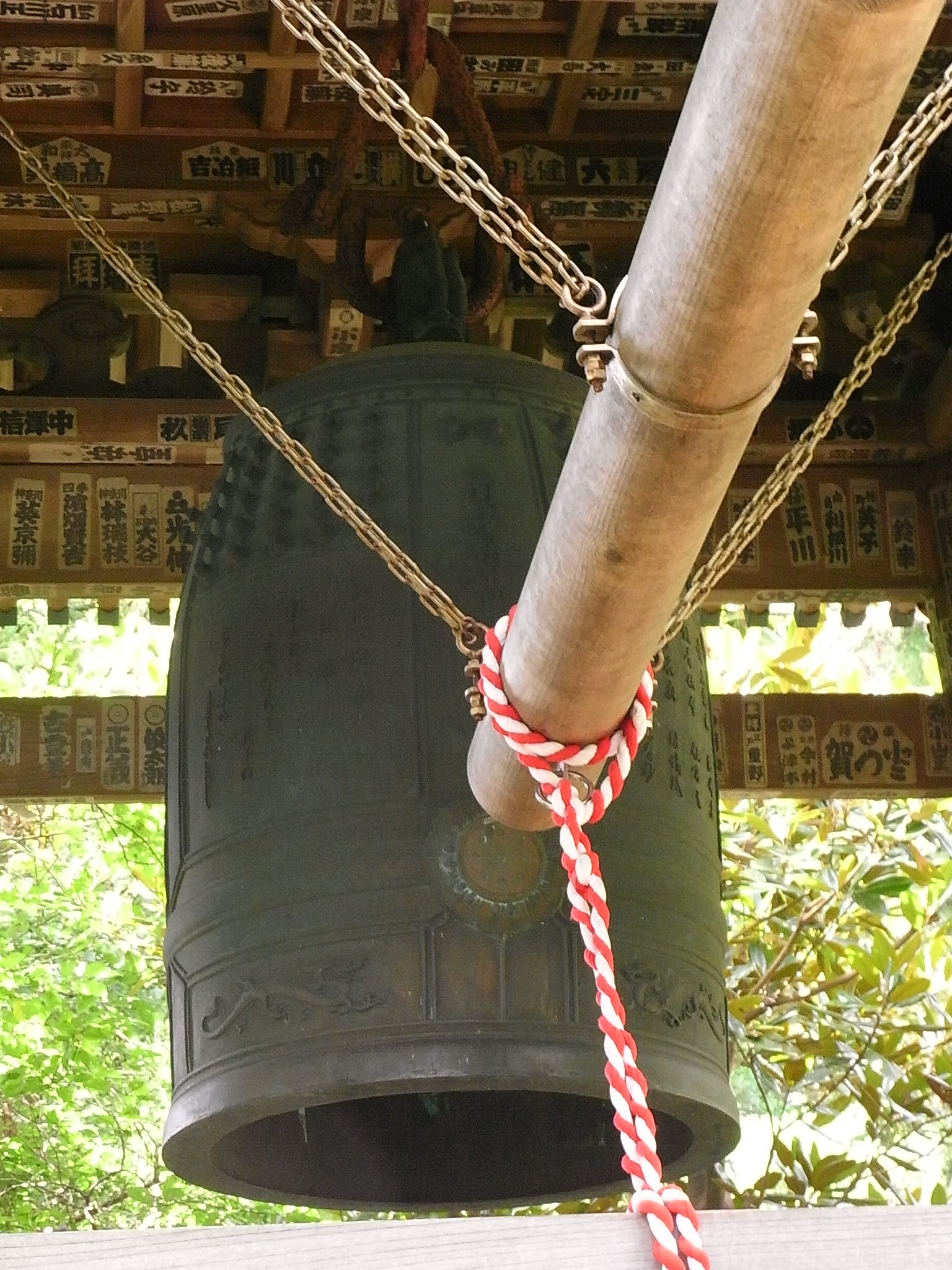
Bonsho

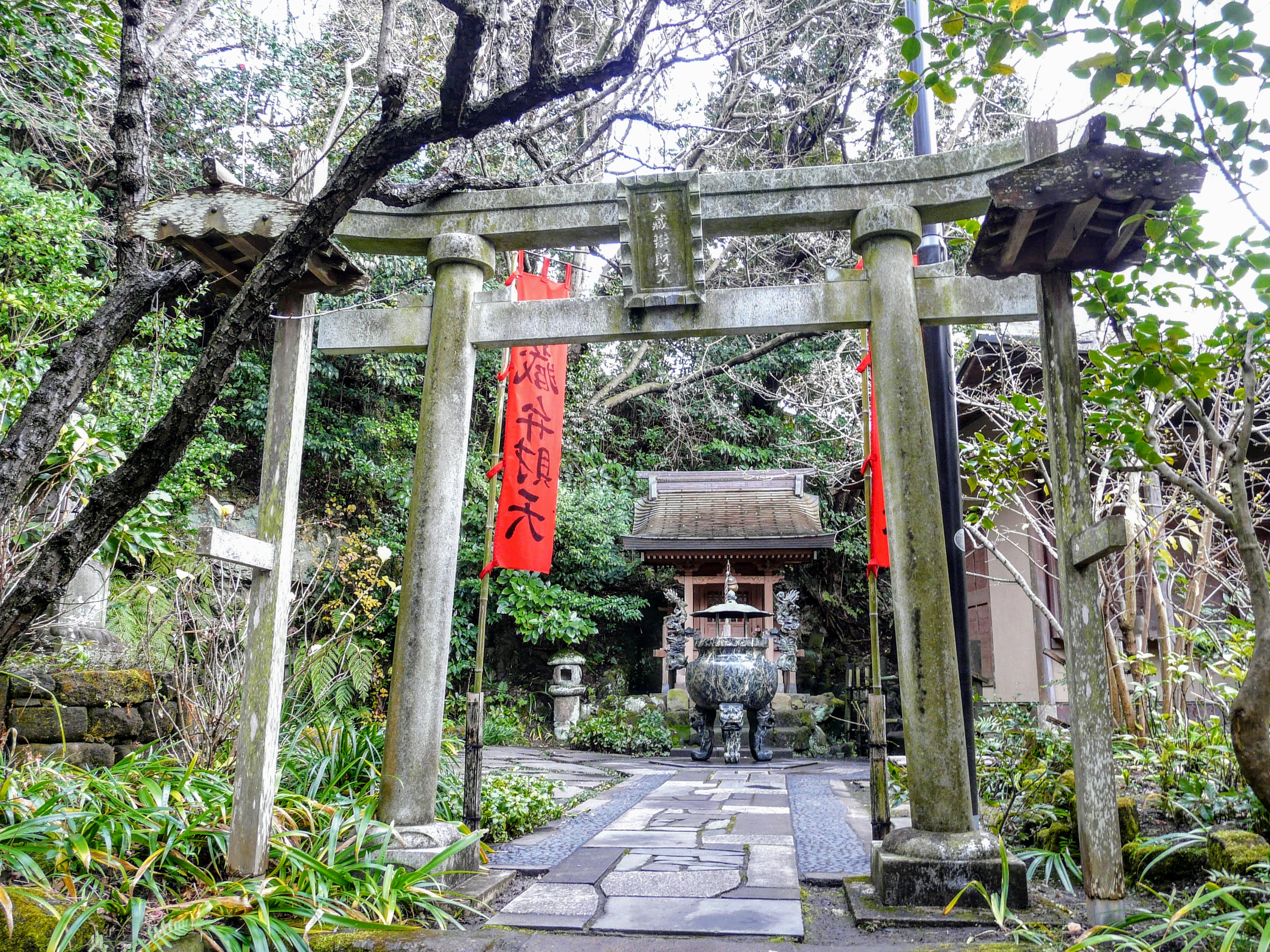
Benzaiten-do

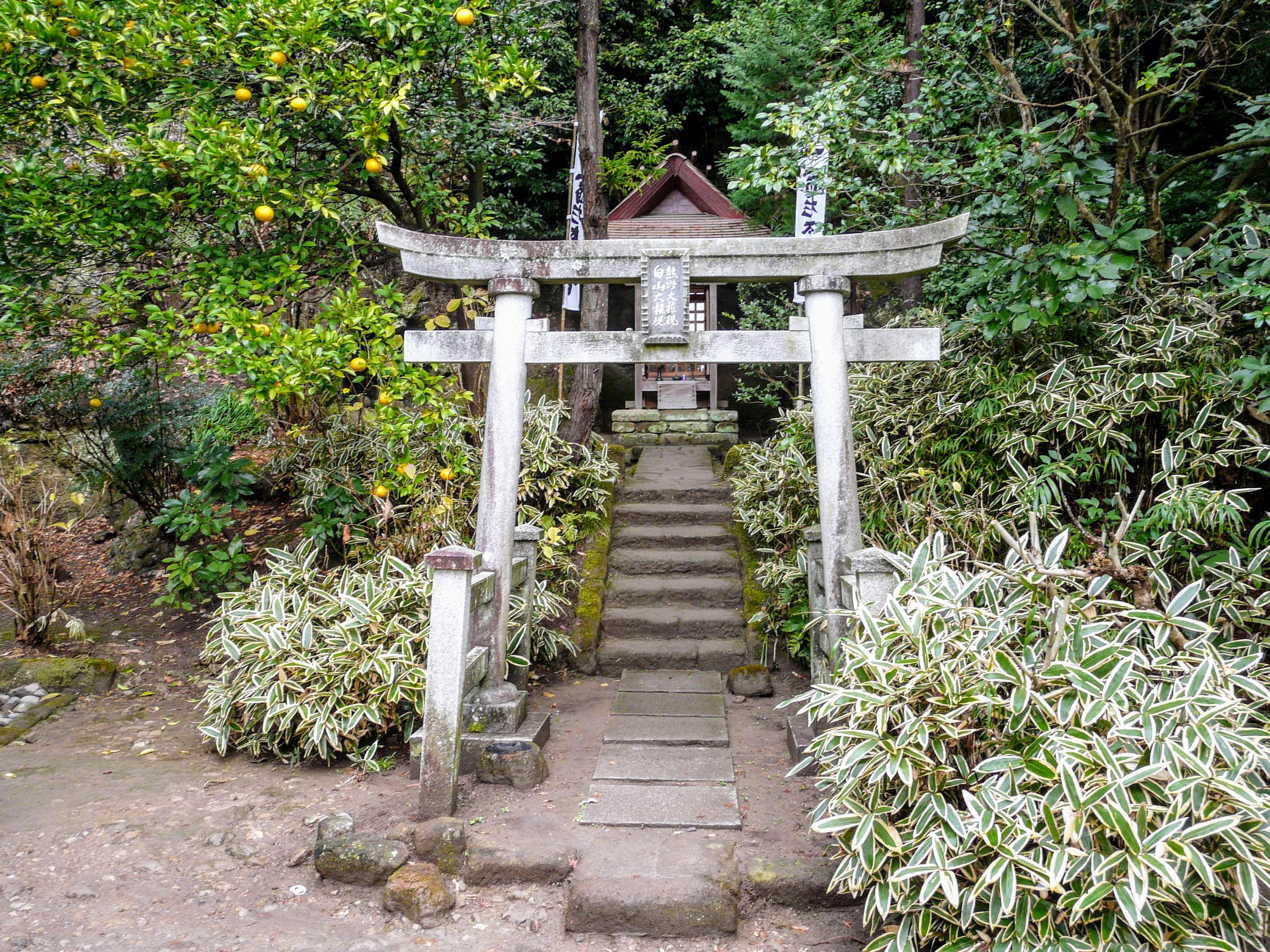
Gongen-do

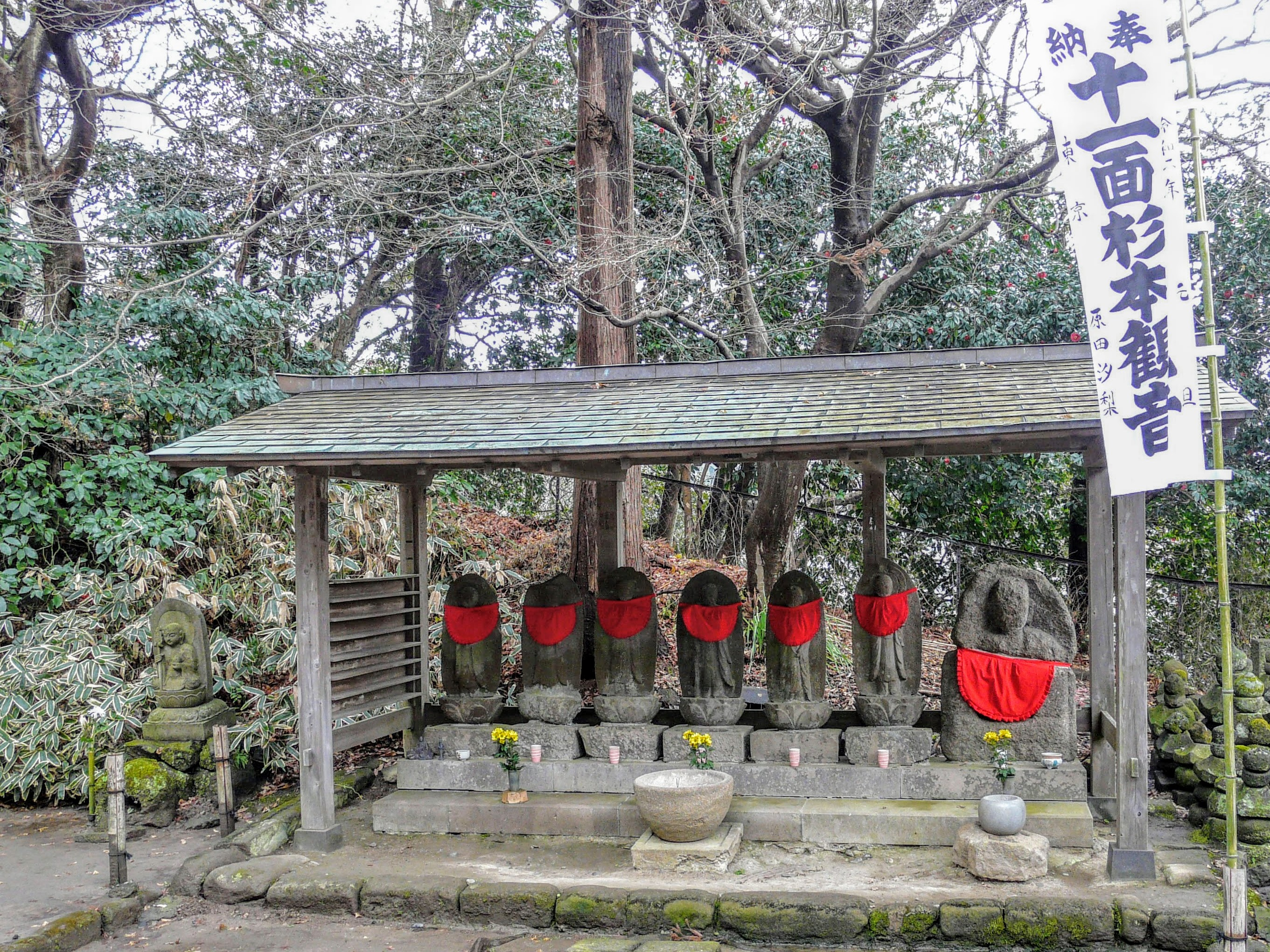
Jizo-do

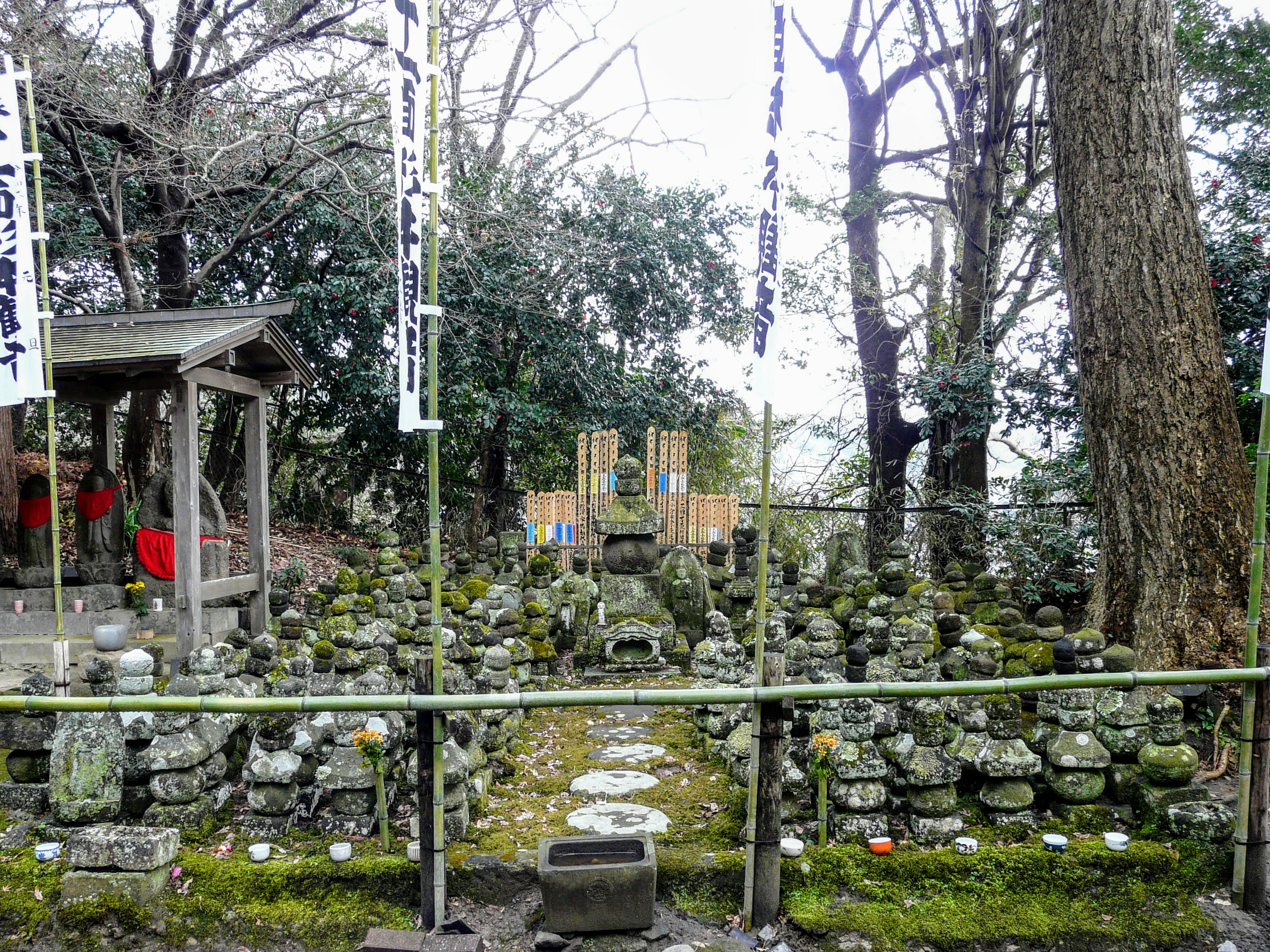
Gorinto

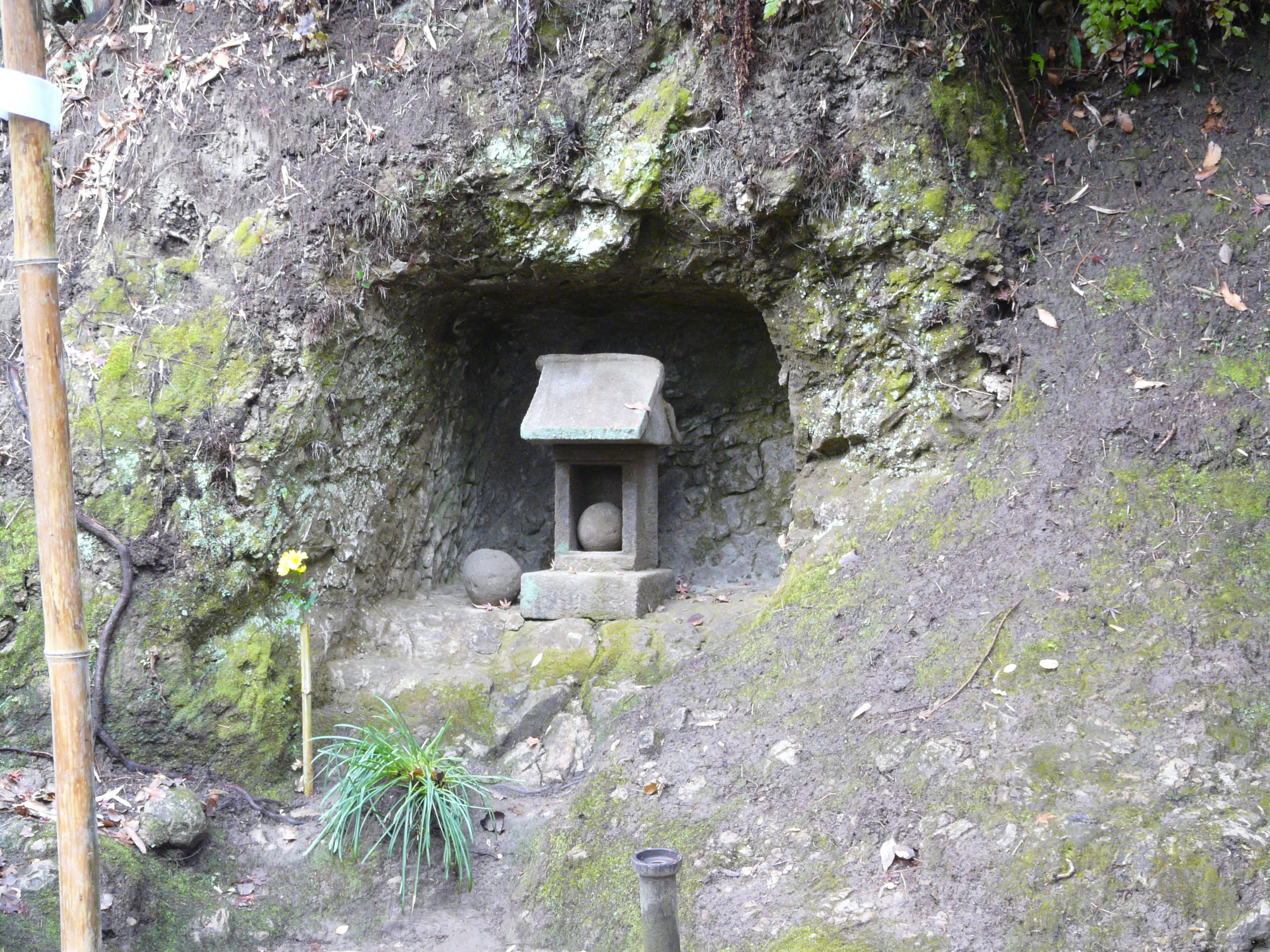
Yagura

The temple is a 30-minute walk east of from JR East Kamakura Station.

== National Important Cultural Properties ==
- Wooden standing Jūichimen Kannon (木造十一面観音立像), Heian period attributed to Ennin
- Wooden standing Jūichimen Kannon (木造十一面観音立像), Kamakura period attributed to Genshin

== Kanagawa Prefectural Tangible Cultural Properties ==
- Kannon-do Hall (杉本寺観音堂 附 棟札), Edo period (1678)

== Kamakura City Tangible Cultural Properties ==
- Wooden standing Jūichimen Kannon (木造彩色十一面観音立像), Heian period, attributed to Gyōki.
- Wooden standing Jizo Bosatsu (木造地蔵菩薩立像)
