= Tōshō-ji =

Hōjō clan's family temple

Coordinates: 35°19′13.56″N 139°33′32.93″E

Seiryūzan Tōshō-ji
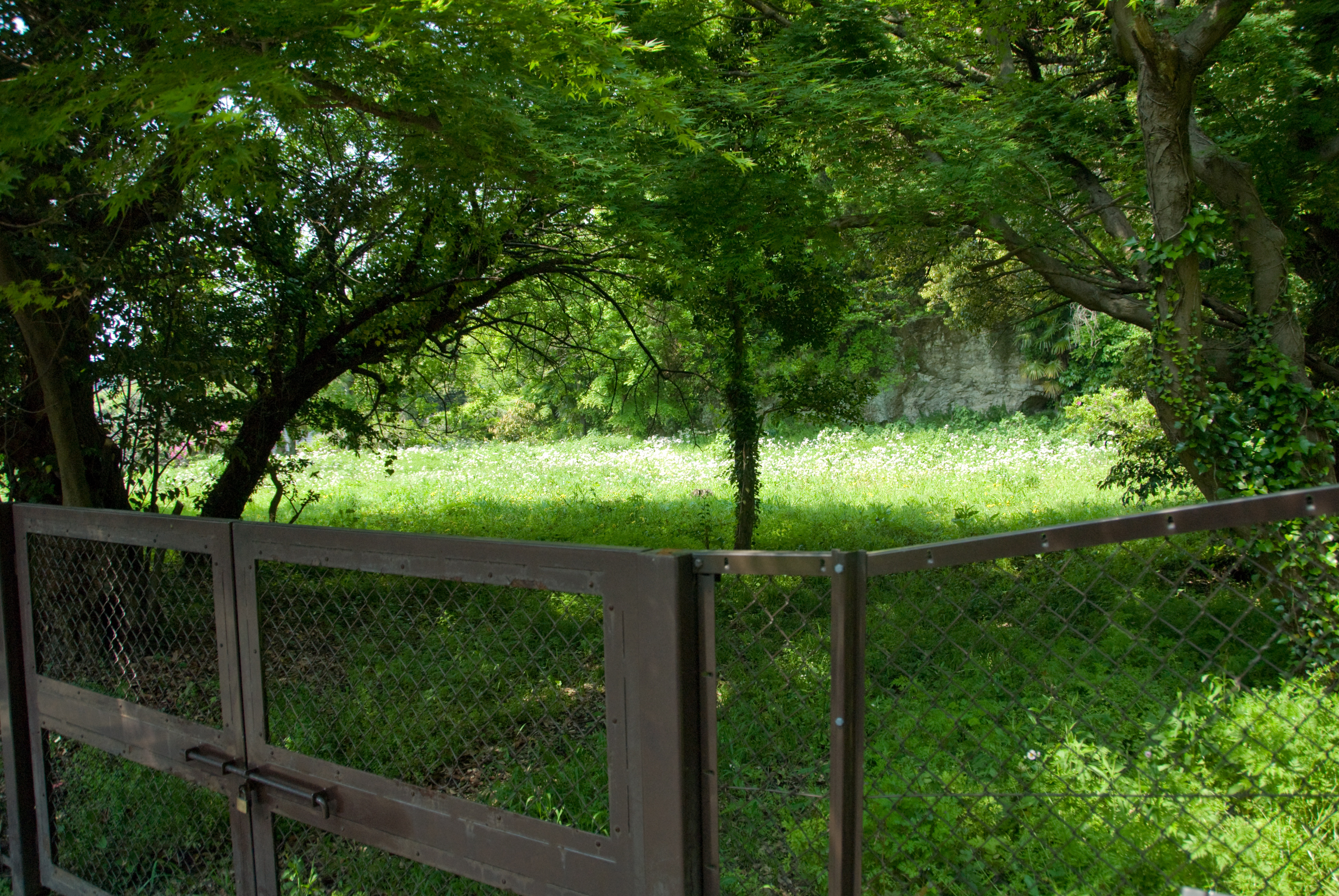
- The site in Kamakura where Tōshō-ji once stood

Religion
- Affiliation: Rinzai
- Status: Closed as of 1333

Location
- Country: Japan
- Interactive map of Seiryūzan Tōshō-ji

Architecture
- Founder: Hōjō Yasutoki, Taikō Gyōyū
- Completed: 1237

Tōshō-ji (東勝寺) was the Hōjō clan's family temple (bodaiji) in Kamakura during the Kamakura period. Its founder was Taikō Gyōyū and it was constructed in 1237 by Hōjō Yasutoki in memory of his mother, who had her tomb there. According to the Taiheiki, from its foundation until the end of the Kamakura shogunate every regent (shikken) was buried there. The temple no longer exists, since it was set on fire by the Hōjō themselves when the entire family committed suicide after Nitta Yoshisada's invasion of Kamakura on July 4, 1333. Its ruins were found in the Kasaigayatsu valley in today's Ōmachi. Tōshō-ji very probably used to occupy the entire valley. Standing at the top of a narrow valley shut off at its base by the Nameri river's deep gorge and by steep hills on the other three sides, and besides offering a clear view of the only road that crossed the river, it was a fortress surely valuable to the family also from the military point of view.

At the site is a plaque that reads:

National Historic Sites - The remains of Toshoji as designated on July 31, 1998 Toshoji is a Buddhist temple founded in the first half of the 13th Century by Yasutoki Hojo, the third vice-shogun of the Kamakura shogunate. In 1333, when Yoshisada Nitta and his troops attacked Kamakura, Takatoki Hōjō, all members of his clan, and his followers shut themselves up in this temple, set it on fire, and there, met their death.

The temple was restored soon after this incident, and in the Muromachi Era (1392–1467) it came to rank third among the ten most renowned temples in the Kanto area. However, it was said to have been later abandoned in the Sengoku Era (1467–1573).

The site is extremely important from an historical viewpoint as the remains of the main temple of the Hojo dynasty, and as the final resting place of the Kamakura Shogunate. By a series of excavations conducted in 1976, 1996, and 1997, part of the remains of the temple has been confirmed.
Board of Education, Kamakura City, March 2000

Excavations in situ have revealed the basic structure of the temple, shards of Chinese pottery, and roof tiles bearing the Hōjō family crest. Stones and other surfaces singed by fire were also found, confirming the presence of a fire.

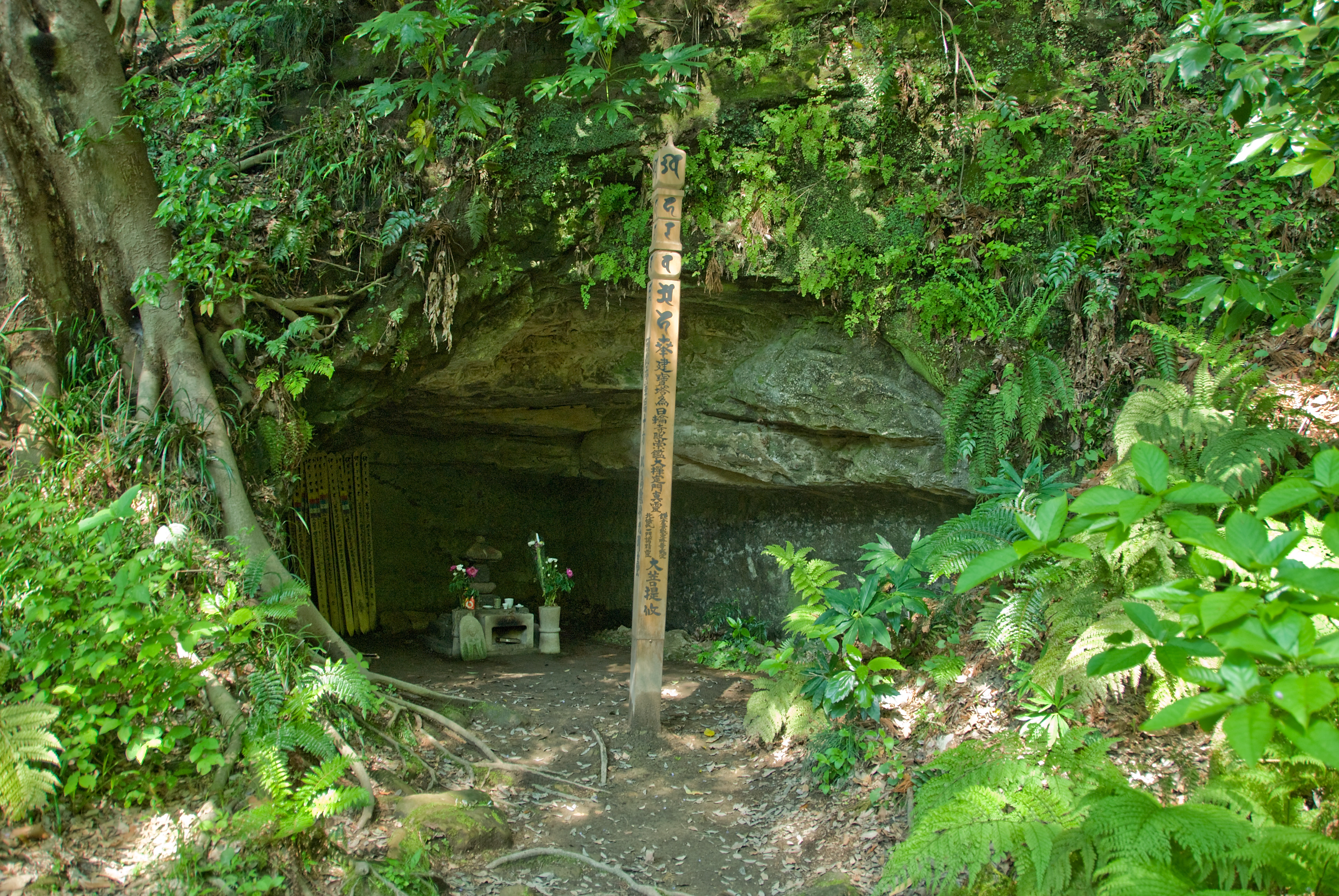
The Hōjō Takatoki Harakiri Yagura

About a hundred meters uphill after the temple, inside the forest lies the Hōjō Takatoki Harakiri Yagura, the cave where, according to tradition, the last of the Hōjō regents disemboweled himself. There are however other locations in Kamakura that make the same claim.

The black stele in front of Takatoki's yagura reads:

In May 1333, when Nitta Yoshisada invaded Kamakura, Regent Hōjō Takatoki left his residence in Komachi and barricaded himself in Tōshō-ji, the family temple where all his ancestors were buried. After that, while watching from afar the lights and smoke of the fires consuming the shops and residences of the entire city of Kamakura that his family had ruled for 150 years, he and his whole family, composed of over 870 people, committed suicide. This tragic act that ended the Hojo's power forever took place here.
Erected in March 1918 by the Kamakuracho Seinendan

Ashikaga Takauji, the first of the Ashikaga shōguns, was ordered by Emperor Go-Daigo to transfer the temple and the Hōjō's remains to a new location, renaming it Hōkai-ji. Because the neighborhood was said to be still haunted by the ghosts of the Hōjō, a shrine called Tokusō Gongen was erected within the new temple to placate them. The shrine still exists and can be seen to the right of Hōkai-ji's main hall.

On the Shakadōgayatsu side of the Shakadō Pass, just before the first houses, a small street to the left takes to a large group of yagura called Shakadōgayatsu Yagura-gun. There rest the bones of some of the Hōjō who killed themselves at Tōshō-ji that day. Their identity has been confirmed by the presence of a gorintō dated exactly eight days after the invasion, eight days being the time required by Buddhism before a funeral can be performed.
