= Hokke-ji (Gifu) =

Buddhist temple in Gifu, Japan

Coordinates: 35°28′22.1″N 136°47′12.5″E

- 法華寺
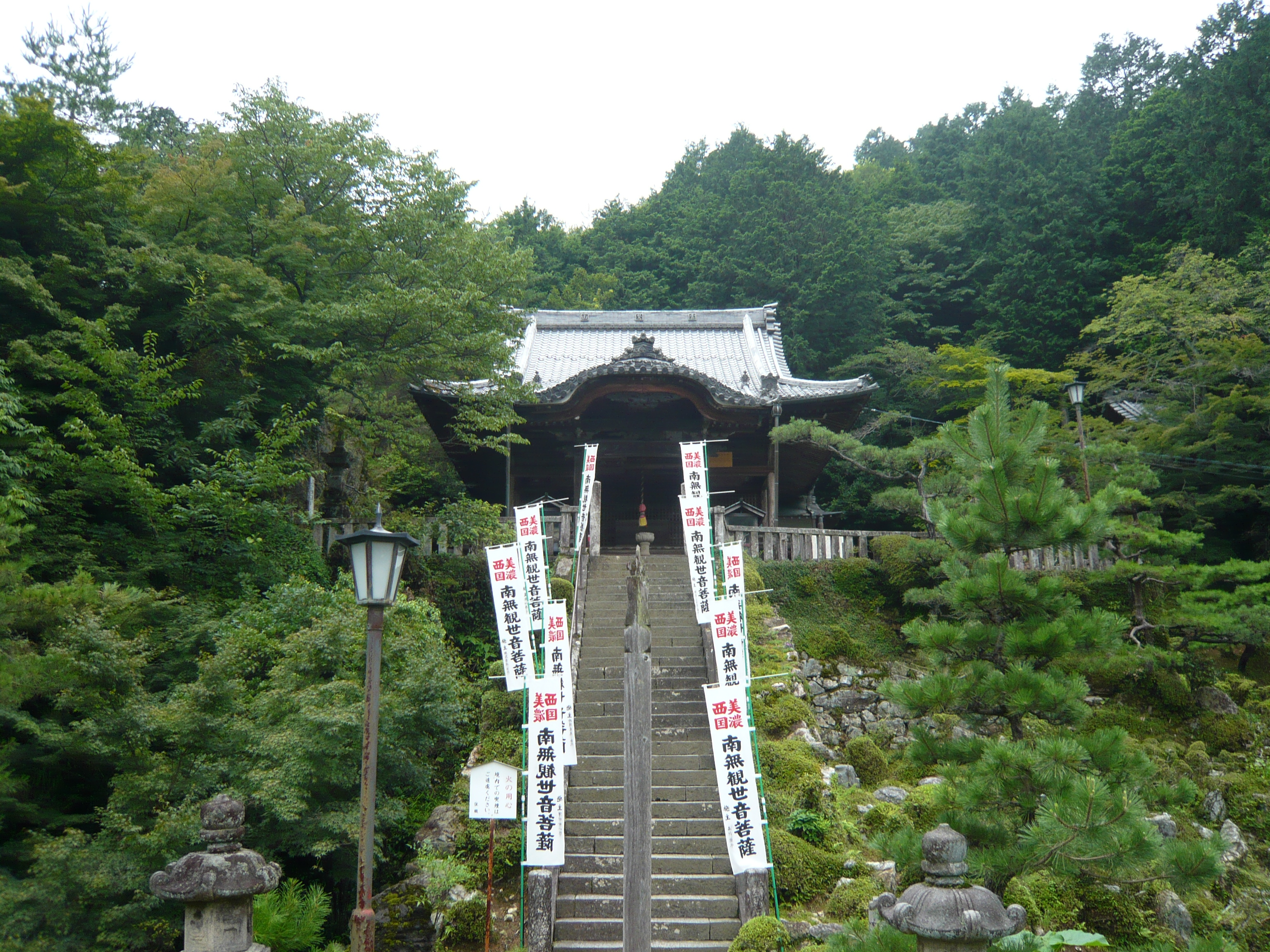

Religion
- Affiliation: Shingon

Location
- Location: 31 Mitahora; Gifu, Gifu Prefecture; 502-0004
- Country: Japan
- Interactive map of Hokke-ji

Architecture
- Completed: 816

Hokke-ji (法華寺) is a Buddhist temple of the Shingon school located in Gifu, Gifu Prefecture, Japan. Though its formal name is Hokke-ji, it is more well known by its unofficial name, Mitahora Kōbō (三田洞弘法).

It is located in the foothills of Mount Dodo, the largest mountain in the city of Gifu. Also, it is the fifteenth of the Mino Thirty-three Kannon.

== History ==
The temple was originally built in 816, by Kūkai under the orders of Emperor Saga. Kūkai's posthumous name was "Kōbō Daishi" (弘法大師), giving rise to the temple's alternate name.

Burnt to the ground by fire in 1620, it was consumed by fire and not rebuilt until 1623. Sixty-one years later, in 1684, it was moved to its current location.

== Festivals ==
- February 3 - Setsubun Star Festival
- 21st of every month - Kōbō Daishi Memorial Service

== See also ==
- Mino Thirty-three Kannon
- Glossary of Japanese Buddhism

== Images ==
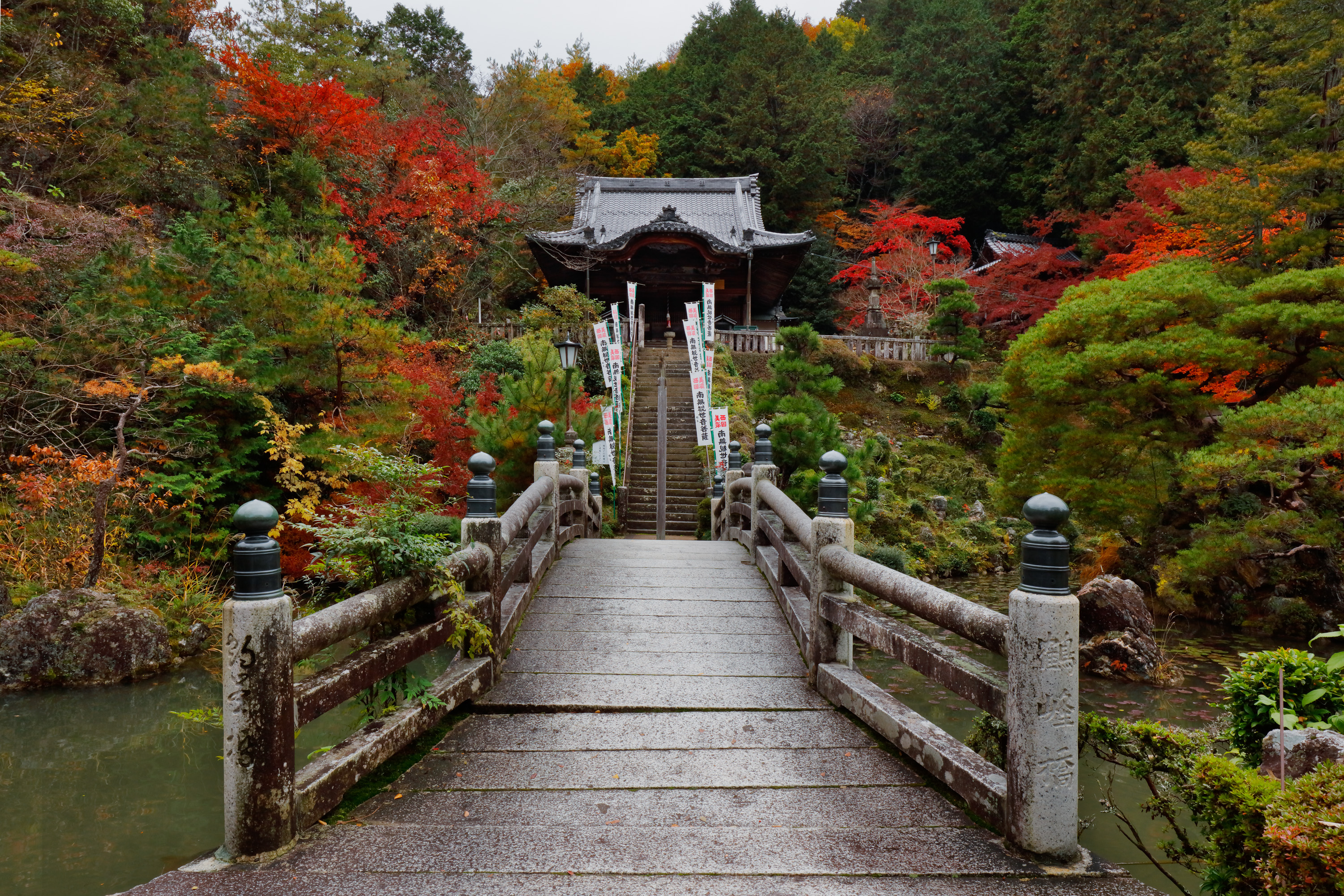

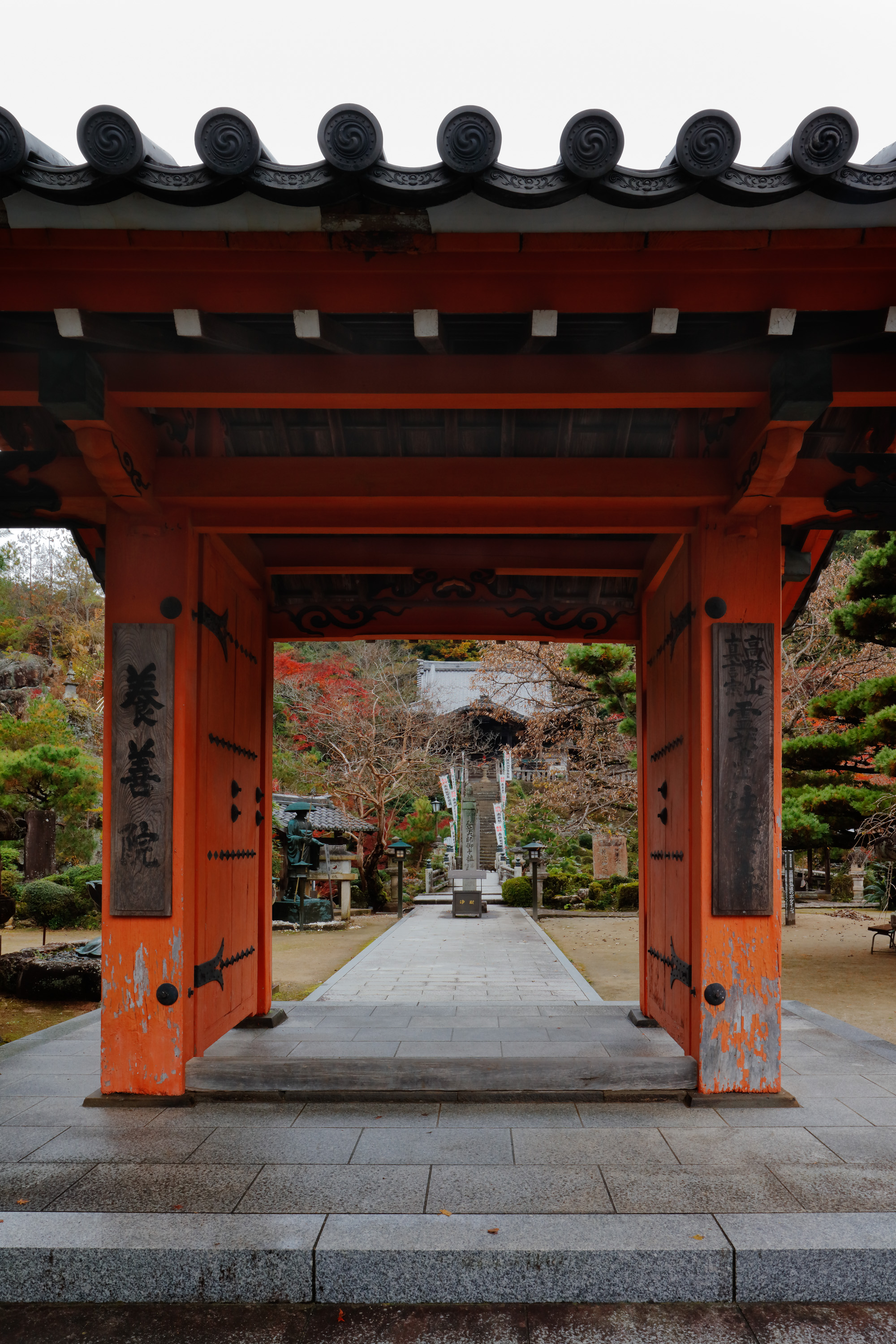

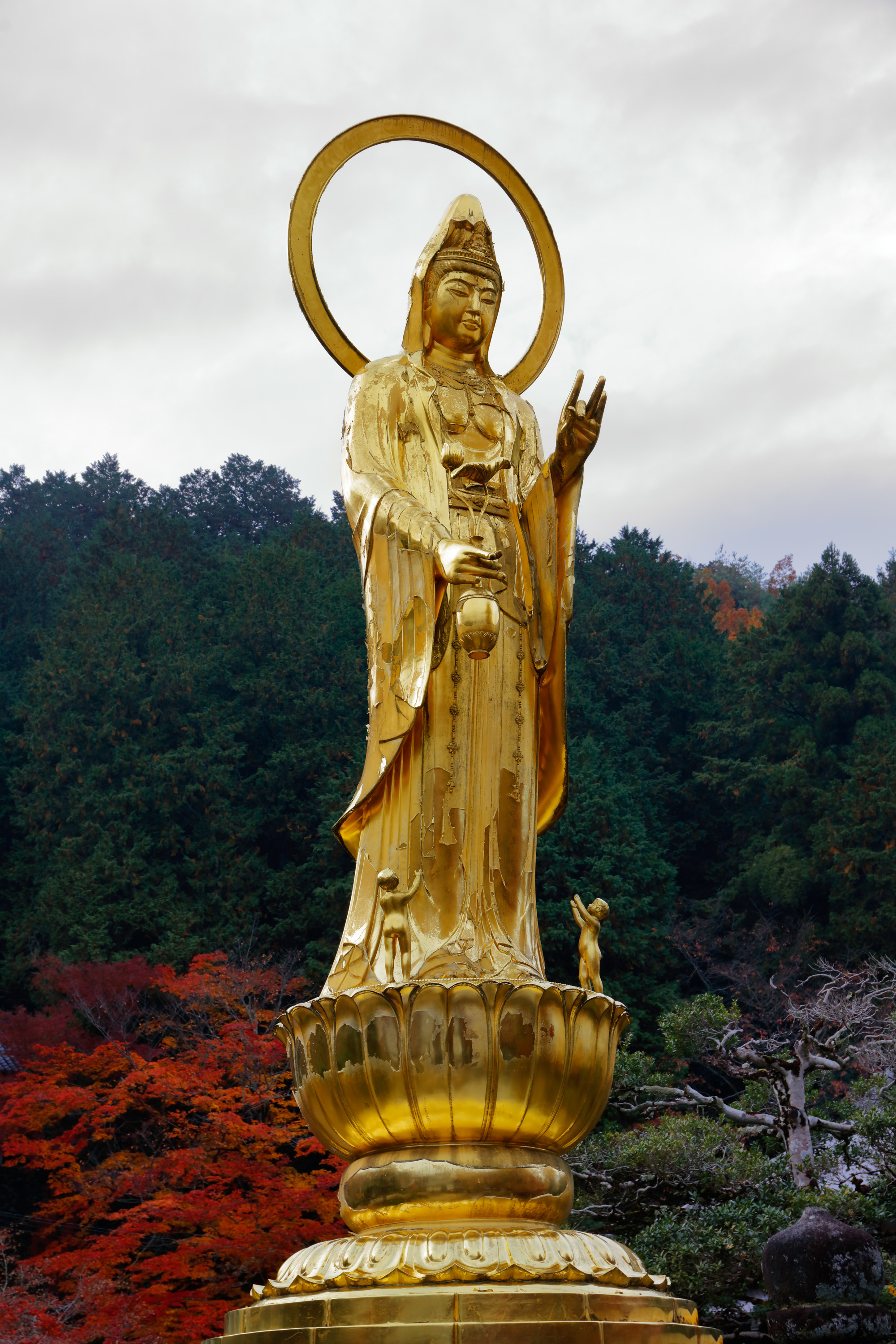

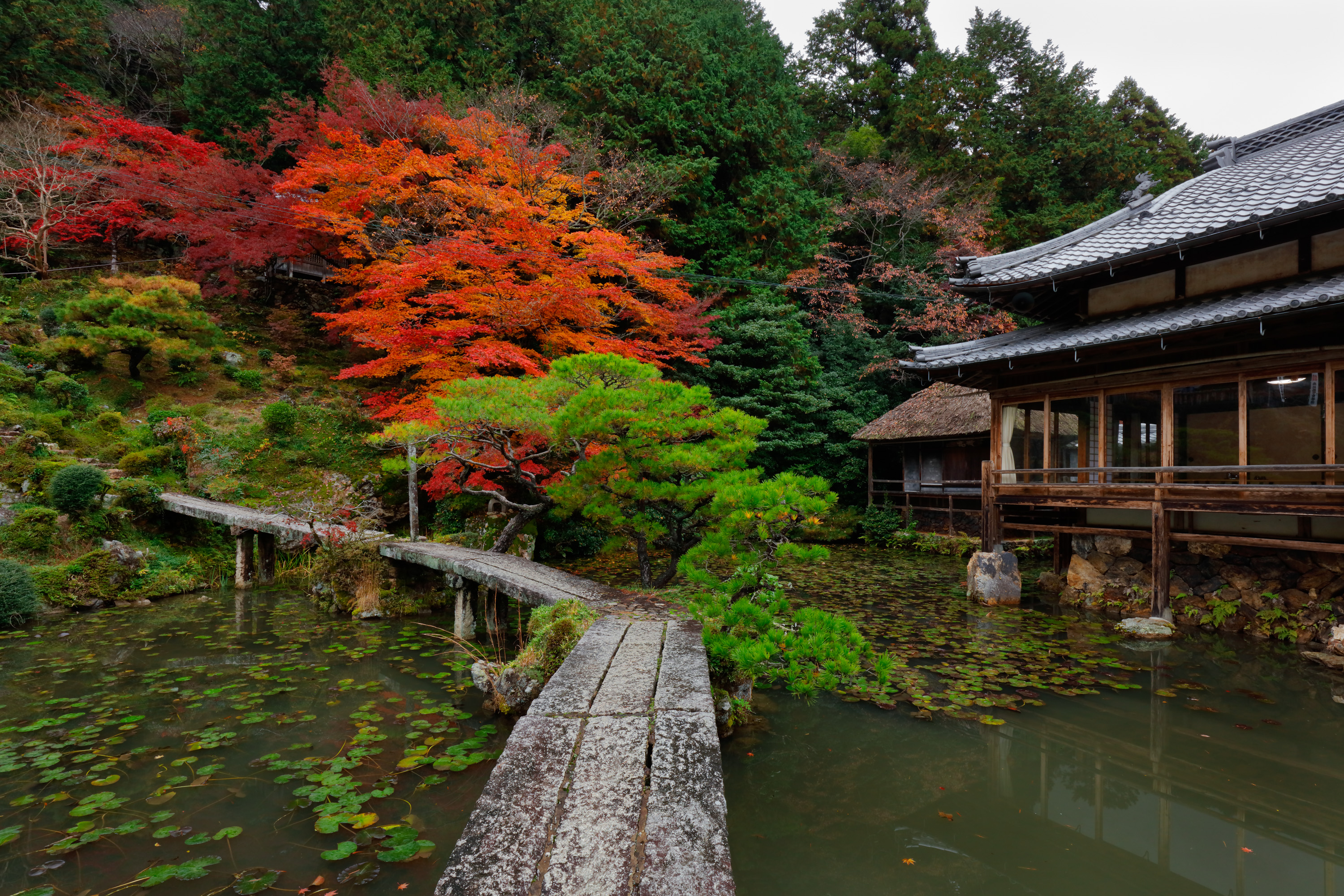

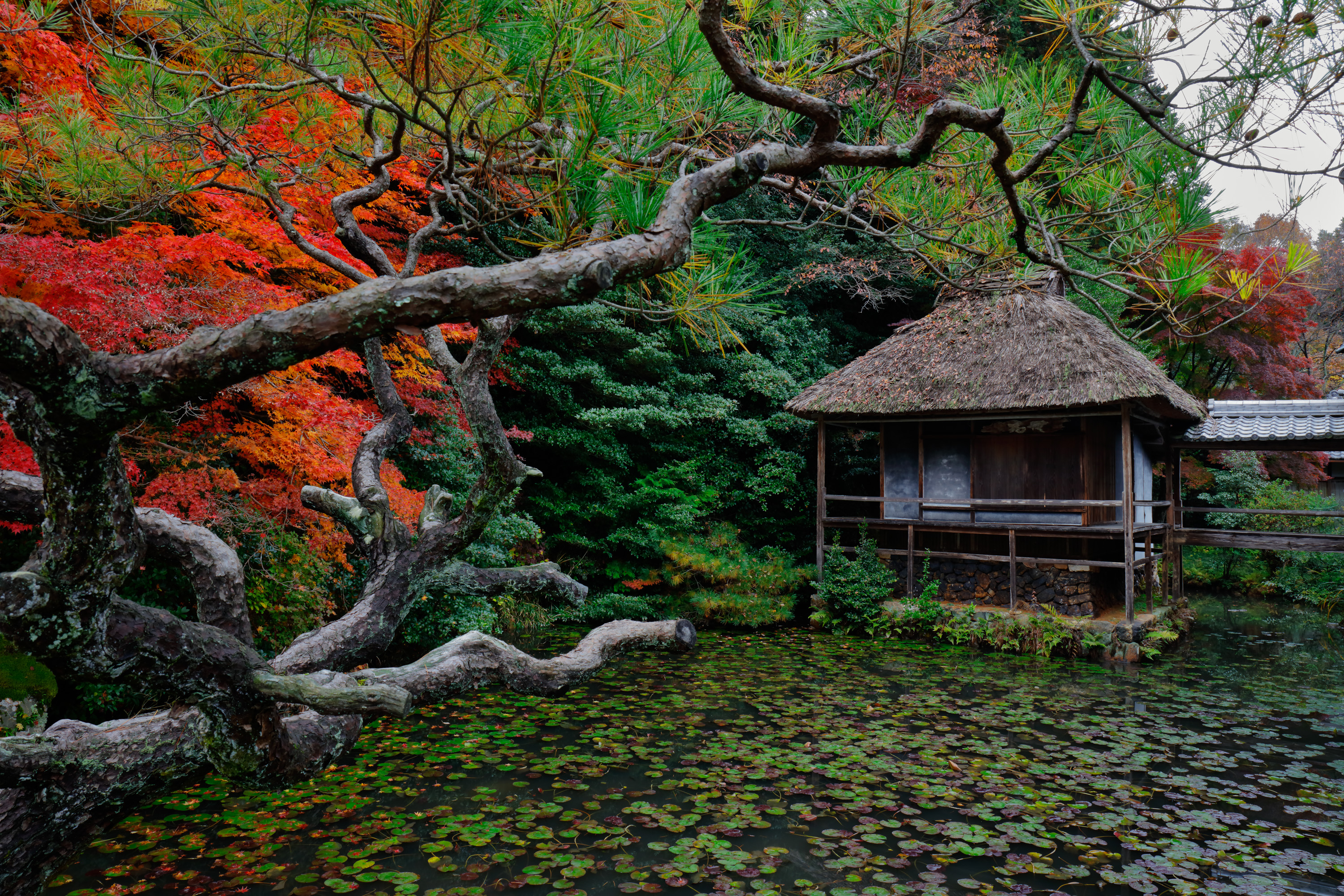

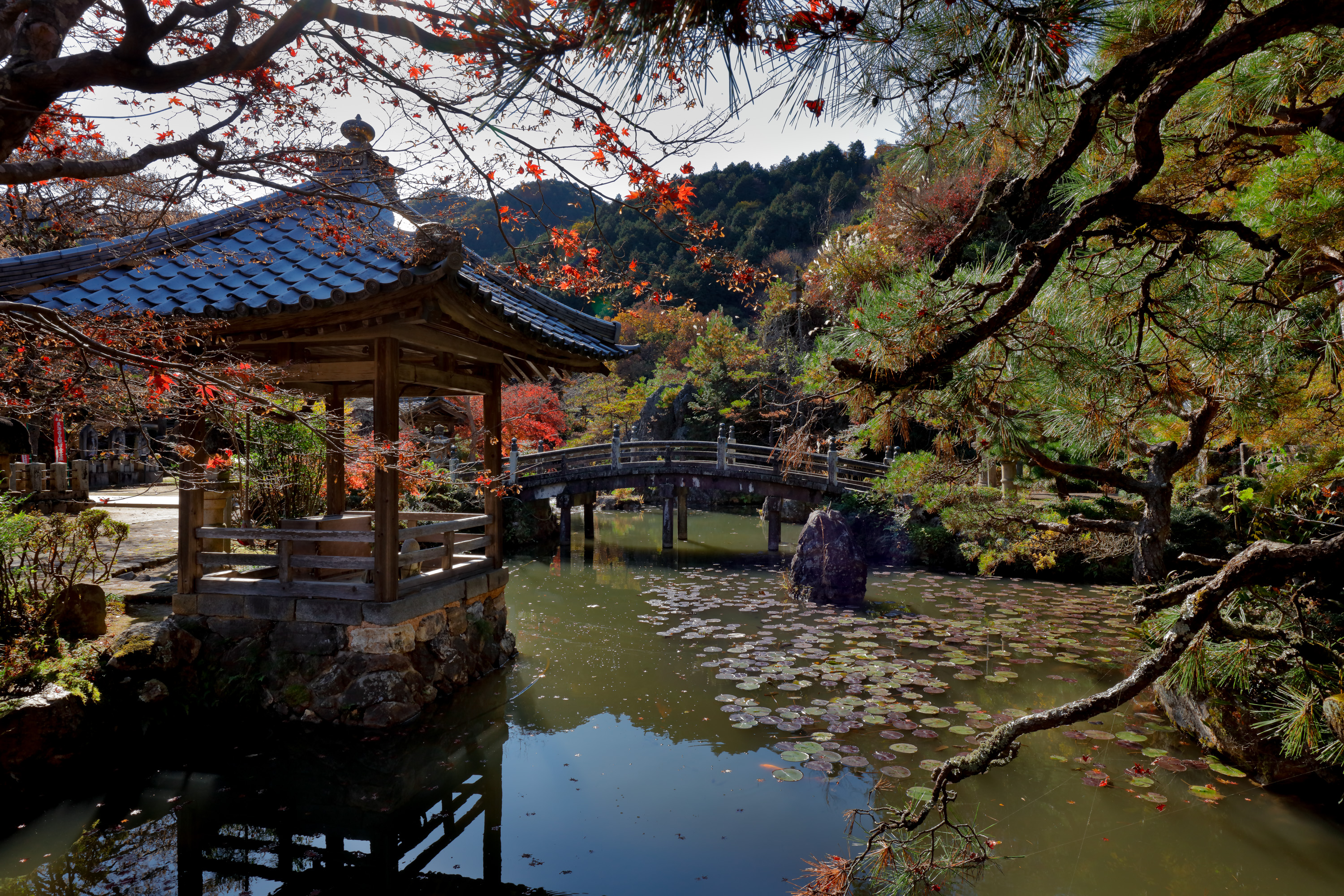

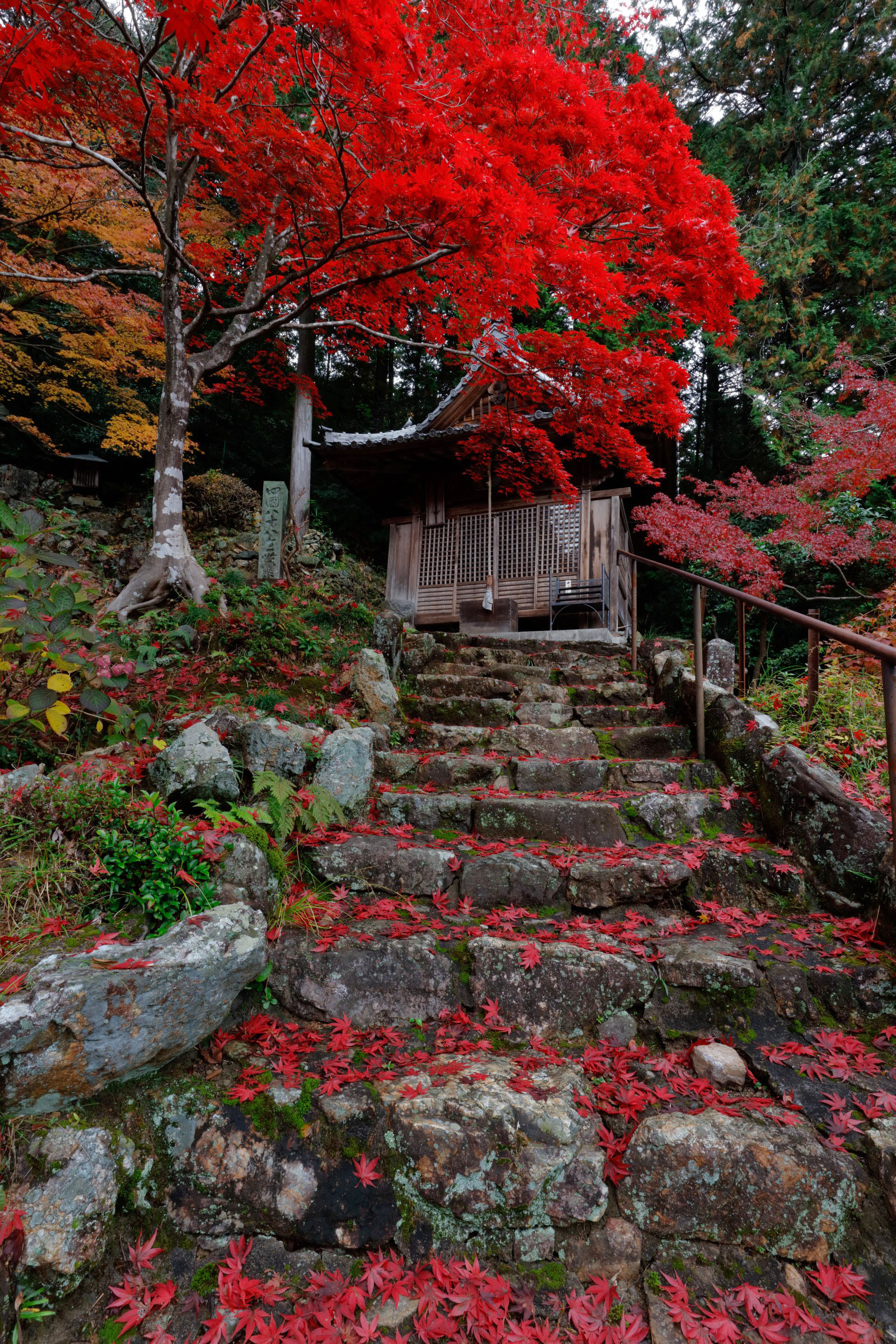

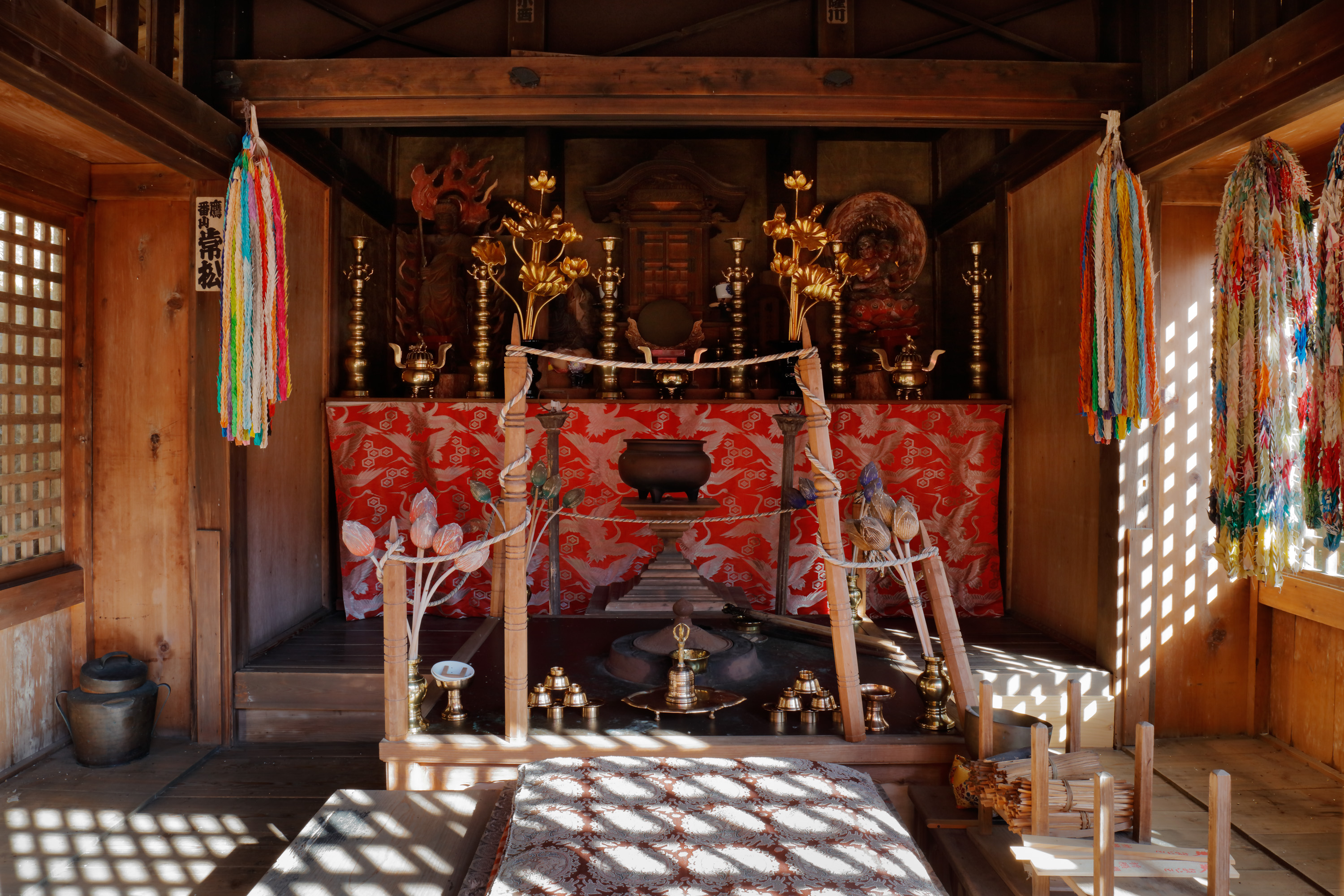

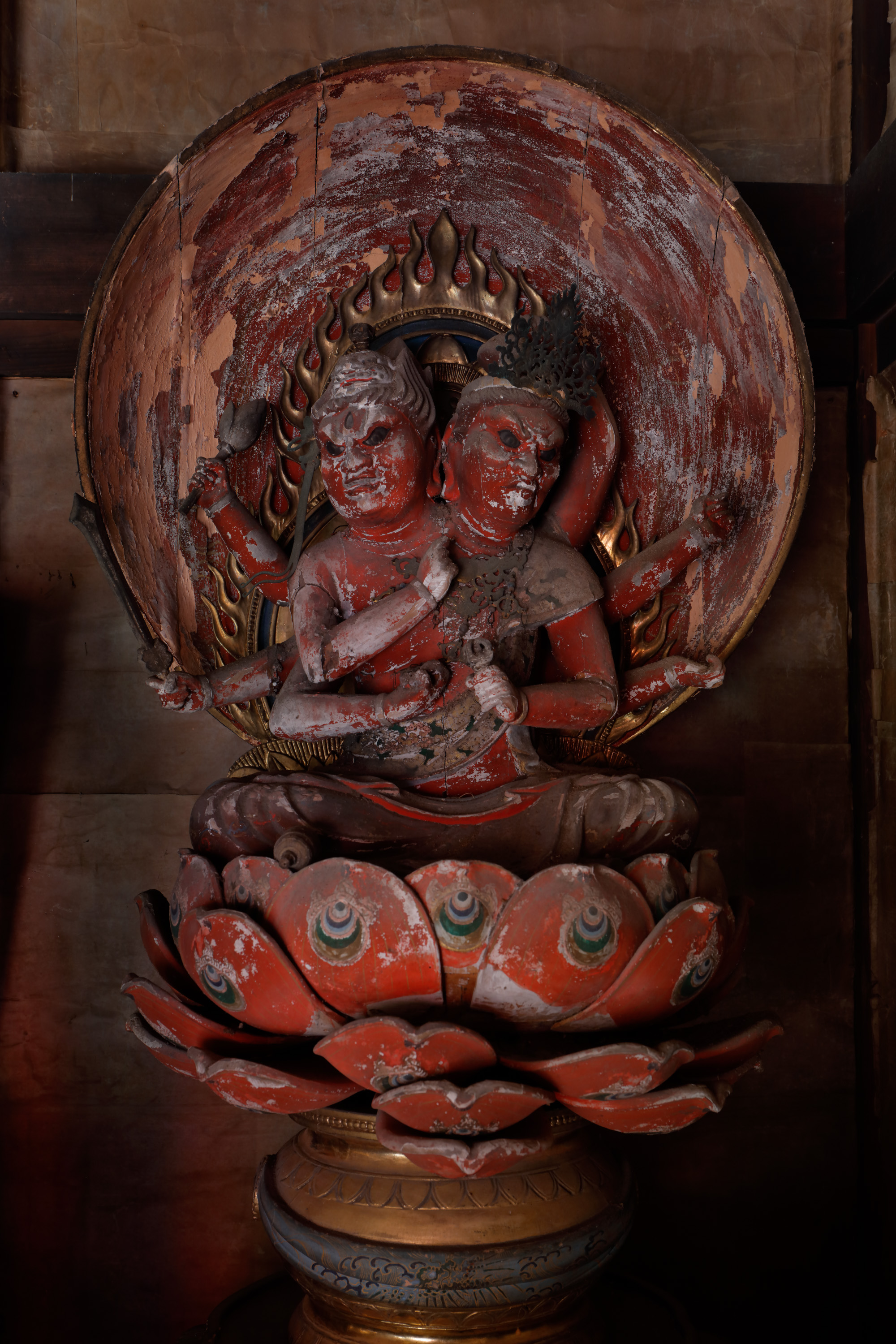

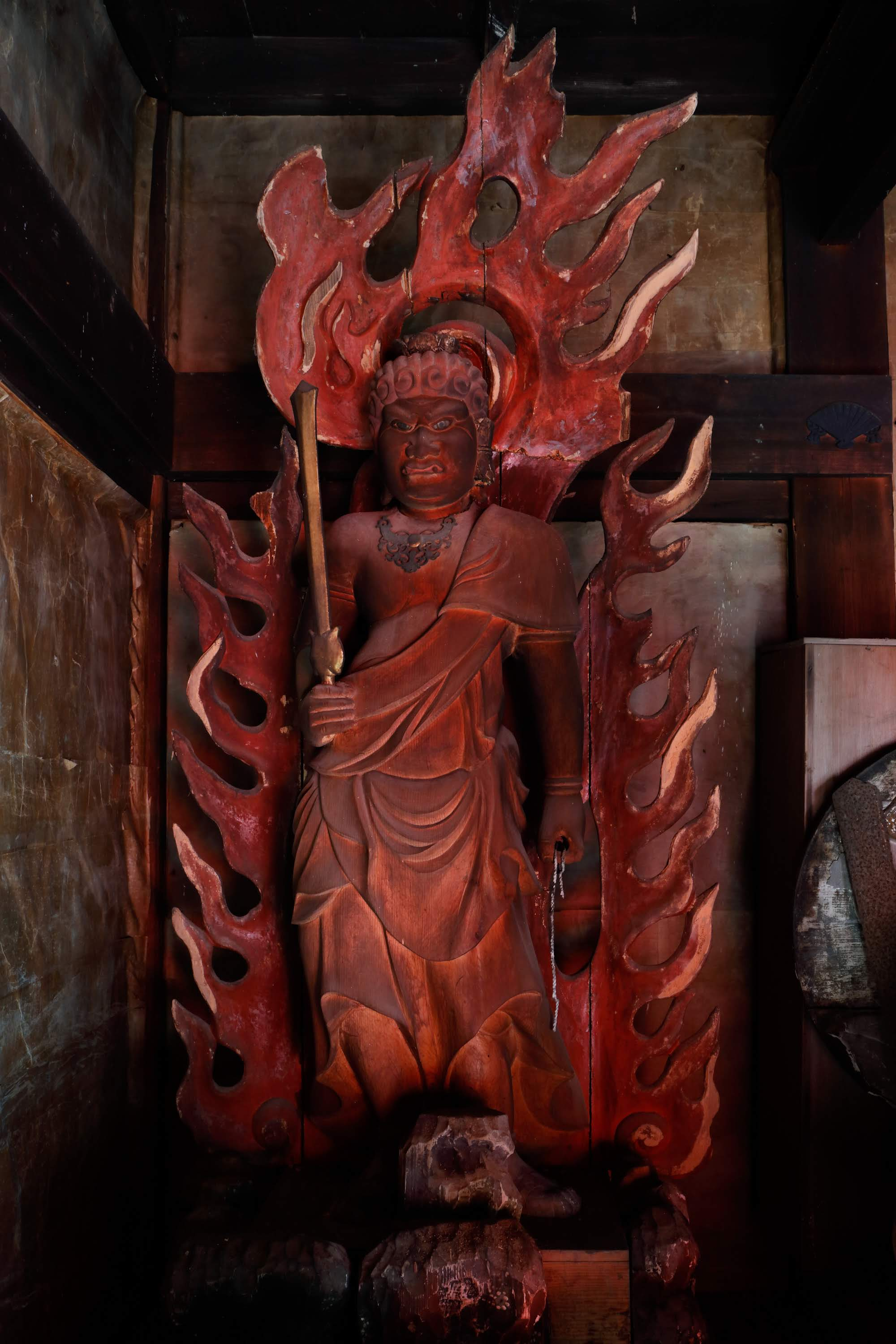
