= Bodaiji =

Type of Japanese Buddhist temples

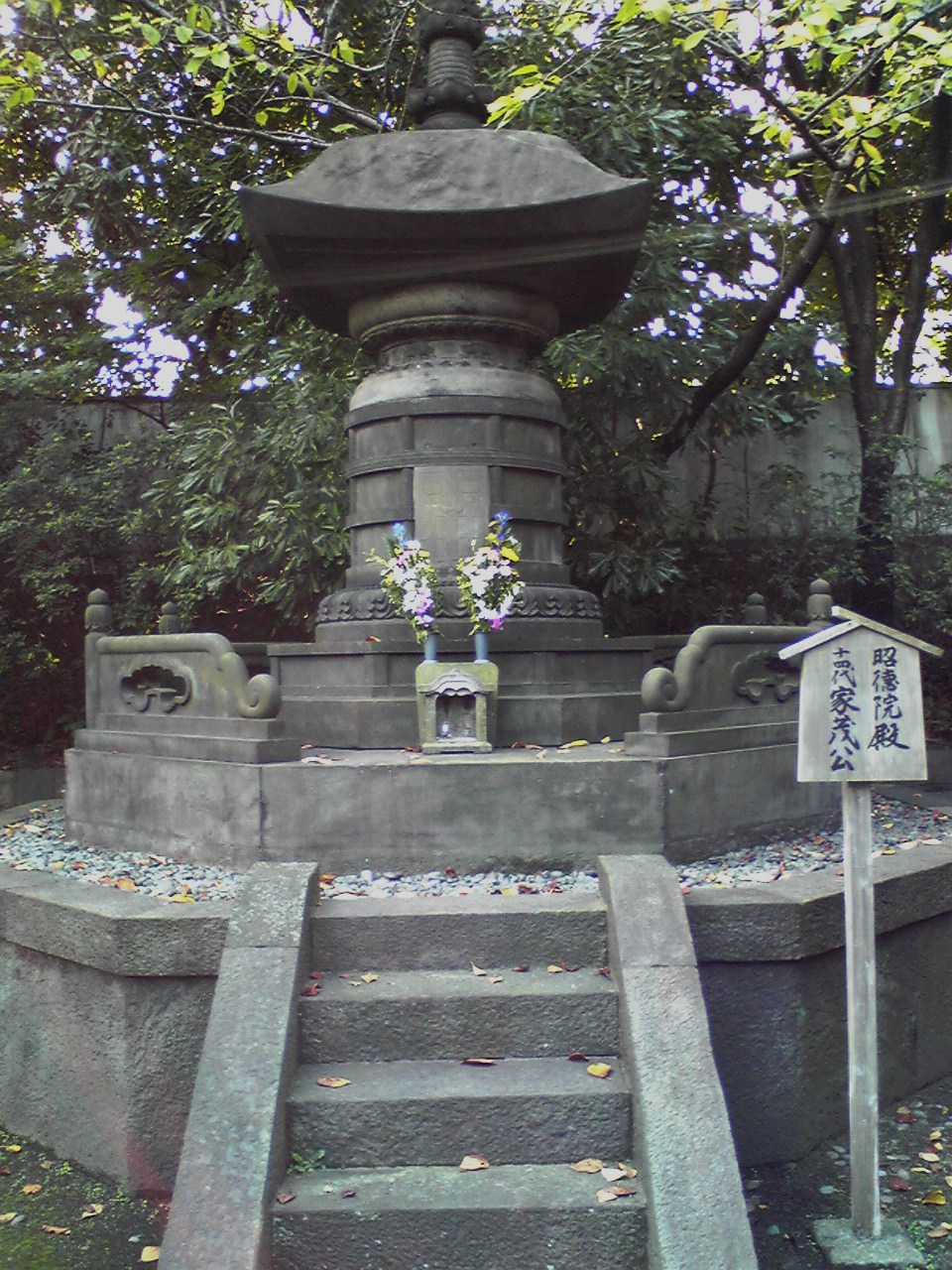
Tokugawa Iemochi's grave at Zōjō-ji, one of the two Tokugawa bodaiji

A bodaiji (菩提寺, lit. "bodhi temple") in Japanese Buddhism is a temple which, generation after generation, takes care of a family's dead, giving them burial and performing ceremonies in their soul's favor. The name is derived from the term bodai (菩提), which originally meant just Buddhist enlightenment (satori), but which in Japan has also come to mean either the care of one's dead to ensure their welfare after death or happiness in the beyond itself. Several samurai families including the Tokugawa had their bodaiji built to order, while others followed the example of commoners and simply adopted an existing temple as family temple. Families may have more than one bodaiji. The Tokugawa clan, for example, had two, while the Ashikaga clan had several, both in the Kantō and the Kansai areas.

== Some famous bodaiji ==
- The Hōjō clan's Tōshō-ji in Kamakura (Kamakura period) (destroyed in 1333)
- The Hōjō clan's Hōkai-ji in Kamakura (Muromachi period)
- The Ashikaga's Tōji-in in Kyoto (Muromachi period)
- Ashikaga Takauji's Chōju-ji in Kamakura (Muromachi period)
- Zuisen-ji in Kamakura (Muromachi period), bodaiji of the five Ashikaga Kantō kubō, rulers of Kantō during the early Muromachi period
- The Tokugawa's Kan'ei-ji and Zōjō-ji in Tokyo (Edo period)
- The Naitō clan's Kōmyō-ji in Kamakura (Edo period)
- Kenchū-ji in Nagoya
- The Imperial Family's Sennyū-ji in Kyoto (mausoleum Tsuki no wa no misasagi is situated)

== See also ==
- Ancestral shrine
