= Hagi Falls =

- 萩の滝
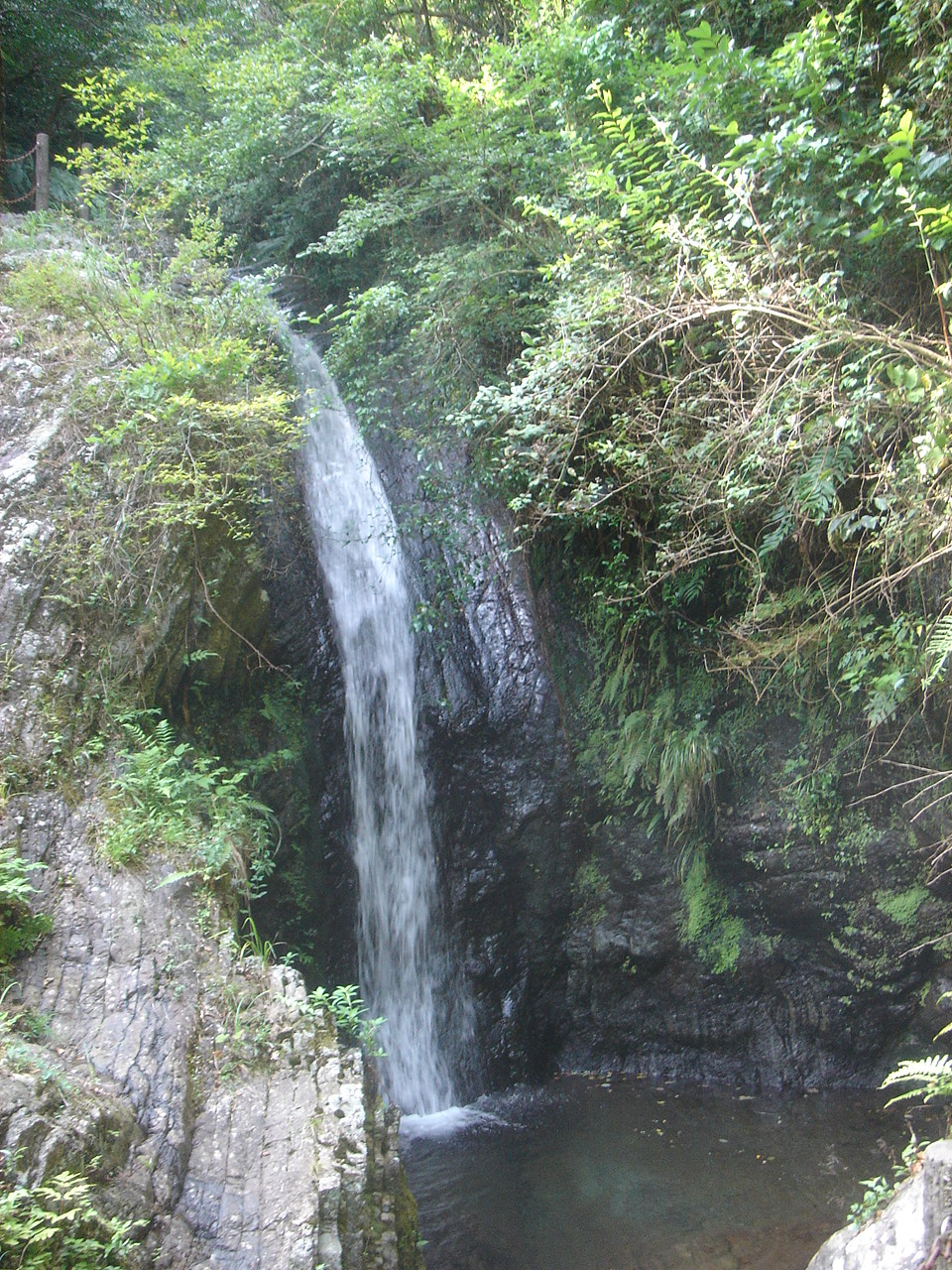
- Hagi Falls
- Interactive map of Hagi Falls
- Location: Gifu, Gifu Prefecture; Japan
- Coordinates: 35°27′23.6″N 136°48′9″E
- Type: Tiered
- Total height: 10 m (33 ft)
- Number of drops: 2
- Total width: 1 m (3 ft)
- Watercourse: Nagara River

The Hagi Falls (萩の滝, Hagi no Taki) is a waterfall located in Mount Dodo's small valley in the city of Gifu, Gifu Prefecture, Japan. In 1986, it was named one of Gifu Prefecture's "50 Famous Waters."

== Geography ==
Hagi Falls is the one natural waterfall located in the city of Gifu. It is 96 km from Nagoya, 438 km from Osaka, 520 km from Kobe, 780 km from Yokohama, 790 km from Tokyo. It received its name because of the abundance of Japanese clover (萩 hagi) that once filled the surrounding area.

It is a two-tiered waterfall, with the upper one being called the "Small Falls" (小滝 Kotaki) and the lower one being called the "Large Falls" (大滝 Ōtaki). Matsuo Pond was built in order to store and make use of the clear water from the Nagara River that flows through the falls.

== Hagi Falls Nature Park ==
The Hagi Falls Nature Park was established to protect the surrounding area. It includes Matsuo Pond and Mount Dodo.
