= Hōkai-ji =

Buddhist temple in Kamakura, Japan

Coordinates: 35°19′19.92″N 139°33′28.75″E

Shakuman-in Endon Hōkai-ji
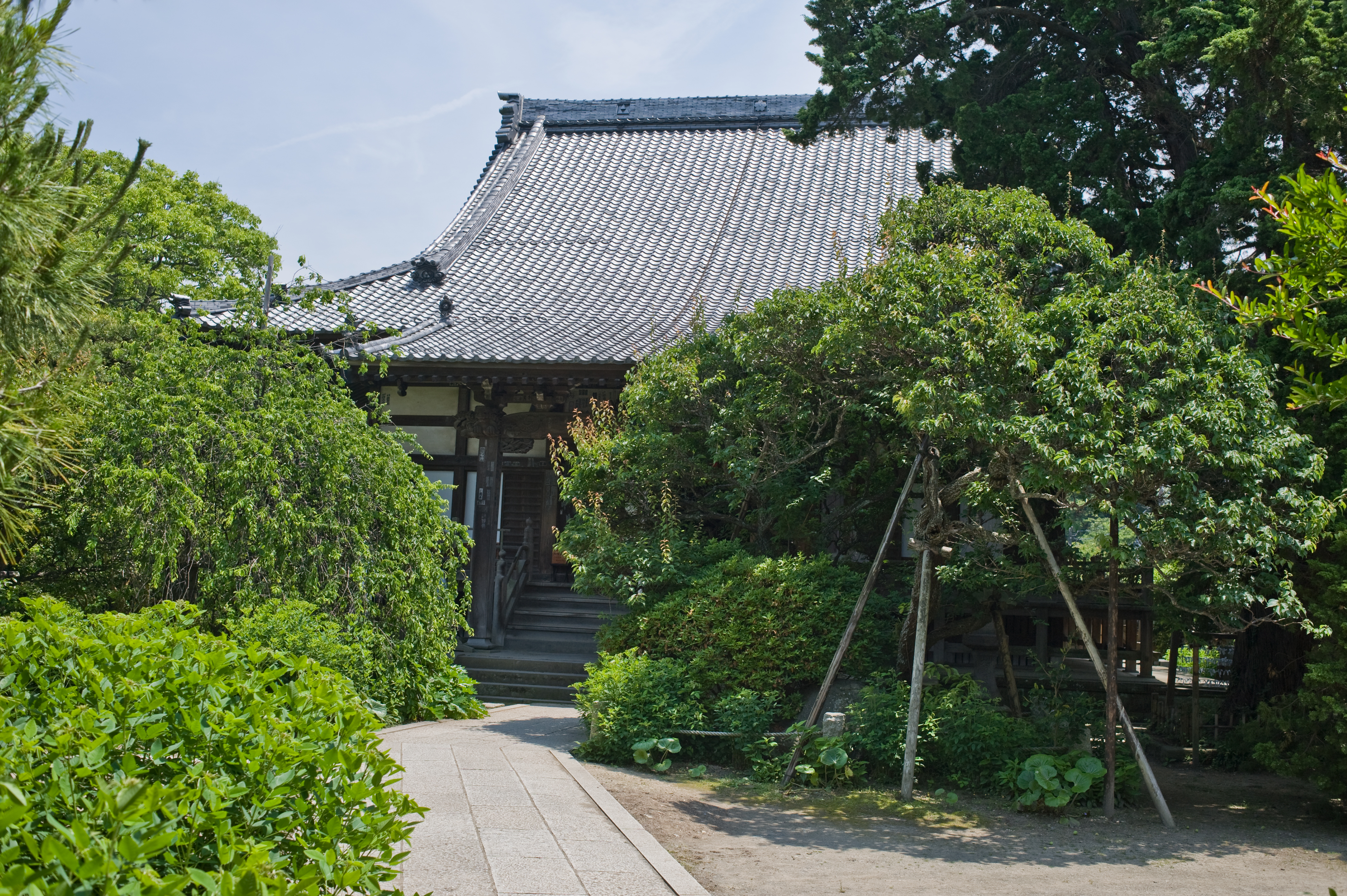
- Hōkai-ji's Main Hall

Religion
- Affiliation: Tendai
- Deity: Jizō Bosatsu

Location
- Location: 5-22, Komachi 3-chome, Kamakura, Kanagawa 248-0006
- Country: Japan
- Interactive map of Shakuman-in Endon Hōkai-ji

Architecture
- Founder: Emperor Go-Daigo and Ashikaga Takauji
- Completed: 1335

Kinryūzan Shakuman-in Endon Hōkai-ji (金龍山釈満院円頓宝戒寺) is a Buddhist temple in Kamakura, Kanagawa Prefecture, Japan. Often called Hagidera (萩寺), or "bush-clover temple", because those flowers are numerous in its garden, its existence is directly linked to a famous tragedy that on July 4, 1333 wiped out almost the entire Hōjō clan, ruler of Japan for 135 years. The temple was founded expressly to enshrine the souls of the 870 members (men, women and children) of the clan who, in accordance with the samurai code of honor, committed suicide on that day at their family temple (bodaiji) of Tōshō-ji to escape defeat. Together with ancient Sugimoto-dera, Hōkai-ji is the only temple of the Tendai denomination in Kamakura. Formerly a branch temple (寺末, matsuji) of the great Kan'ei-ji (one of the two Tokugawa family temples), after its destruction it became a branch of Enryaku-ji.

== History ==
The temple of Tōshō-ji was built in 1237 by Hōjō Yasutoki in memory of his mother and, according to the Taiheiki, from its foundation until the end of the Kamakura shogunate it was the Hōjō's funerary temple (bodaiji); every Hōjō regent had been buried there. The Taiheiki relates how on July 4, 1333, when the shogunate fell at the hands of Nitta Yoshisada, almost all members of the Hōjō clan in Kamakura barricaded themselves inside Tōshō-ji, set it on fire and killed themselves, leaving just a few survivors. Recent excavations in situ have revealed the basic structure of the temple, shards of Chinese pottery, and roof tiles bearing the Hōjō family crest. Stones and other surfaces altered by heat were found, which confirmed the presence of a fire.

=== Hōkai-ji ===
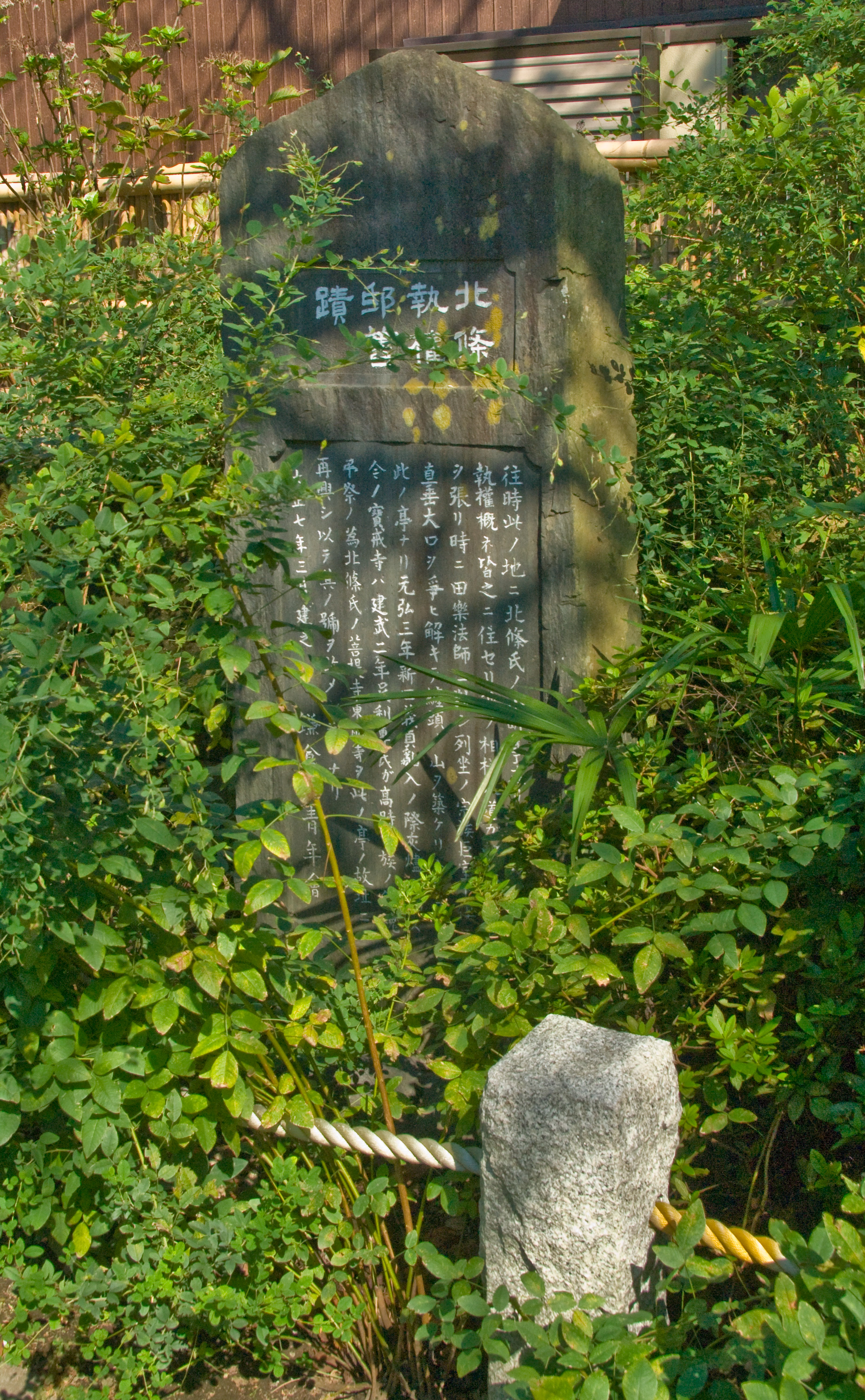
The stele describing Hōkai-ji's history

The man who would later become the first of the Ashikaga shōguns, Ashikaga Takauji, was given by Emperor Go-Daigo the order to build a new temple, today's Hōkai-ji, in a certain spot in Komachi, move there the remains of the clan and make it the new Hōjō funeral temple. (Tōshō-ji was rebuilt where it used to stand.) That particular area was chosen because it had been until 1333 the Hōjō clan's Komachi residence. Later, because the locals claimed that the neighborhood was still haunted by Hōjō ghosts, a shrine called Tokusō Gongen was erected within the temple to placate them. The shrine still stands next to Hōkai-ji's main hall.

The stele at the temple's entrance (see photo on the left) reads:

This is where the Komachi residence of the Hōjō clan used to stand. Starting from [second regent] Hōjō Yoshitoki, the regents usually lived here. [Last regent] Hōjō Takatoki would party here day and night and sometimes would, together with the other vassals, toss a dengaku performer a mountain of hitatare (a type of garment) and hakama as a reward. The mansion was destroyed by fire during Nitta Yoshisada's invasion of Kamakura in 1333. Today's Hōkai-ji was built here in 1335 by Ashikaga Takauji. This temple was built here as the Hōjō's funeral temple to soothe the resentment of Takatoki and his clan, who had previously been enshrined at Tōshō-ji.

After the failure of Emperor Go-Daigo's Kenmu Restoration and his consequent fall from power, Hōkai-ji came under the protection of Ashikaga Takauji himself. The temple's shichidō garan was finally completed around 1353. The temple was completely destroyed by fire in 1538. At the beginning of the Edo period, Tenkai, founder of Kan'ei-ji, asked shogun Tokugawa Ieyasu if the temple could be supported and maintained by the state.

== Points of interest ==
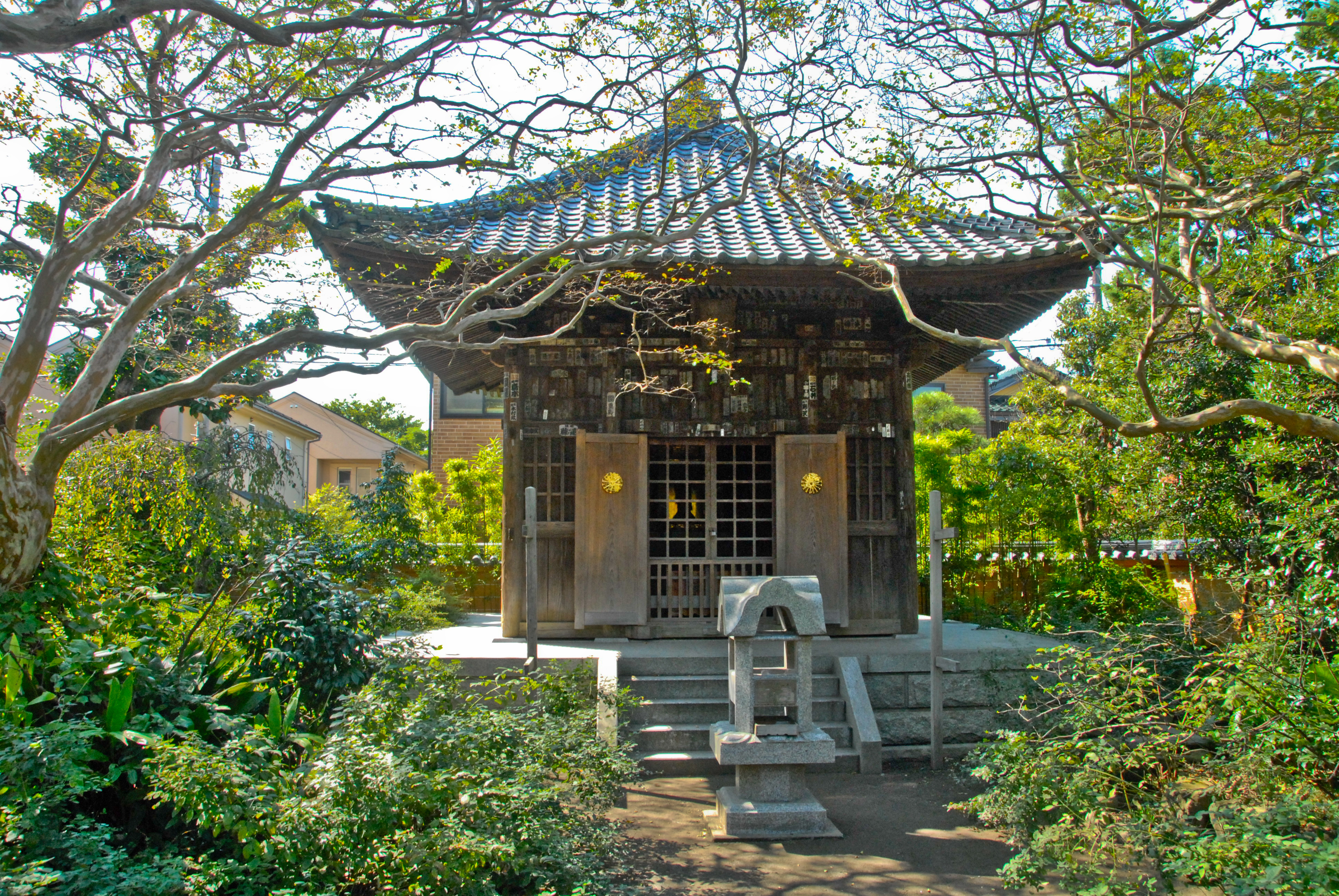
The Taishi-dō

The temple's Hon-dō is open to the public and contains many valuable objects. Among the others, it houses Hōkai-ji's main object of worship, a seated statue of Jizō Bosatsu carved in wood around 1365 by artist Sanjō Hōin Ken'en. The statue is a national Important Cultural Asset. On the two sides stand the statues of gods Bonten (Brahma) and Taishakuten (Indra), both made during the Nanboku-chō period and both prefectural Important Cultural Properties. There are also the statues of the Ten Deva Kings, of Enma, lord of the Beyond, and a sitting statue of the temple's founder Enkan. Finally, the Main Hall contains another national Important Cultural Property, a statue of Shokei, the second head priest of the temple, made in 1372.

To the right of the Main Hall stands the Kankiten-dō, a small structure enshrining Kangiten (or Kankiten) (歓喜天, god of delight), who is the Buddhist version of god Ganesh. The 152 cm statue inside the building, representing two elephant-headed human beings (a male and a female) embracing, represents him. Because of the statue's sexual connotations, the building however is, like most halls dedicated to this deity, closed to the public.

The shrine and the torii nearby constitute Tokusō Daigongen (得宗大権現, Tokusō's shrine), founded to pacify the souls of the Hōjō. The building was rebuilt in 1992 and contains a statue of Hōjō Takatoki, the last regent and, following protocol, the last Hōjō to kill himself.

Next to the entrance stands the Taishi-dō (太子堂, Prince's Hall) dedicated to Prince Shotoku, who adopted Buddhism as the official religion of Japan. On the doors is visible the chrysanthemum, symbol of the Imperial Household. Every year on January 22, carpenters, plasterers and blacksmiths gather together for the memorial service held in his honor. The prince was directly responsible for the construction of many temples, Hōryū-ji among the others.
