= Mount Dodo =

Mountain in northern Gifu, Gifu Prefecture, Japan

Coordinates: 35°27′47″N 136°48′00″E

- 百々ヶ峰
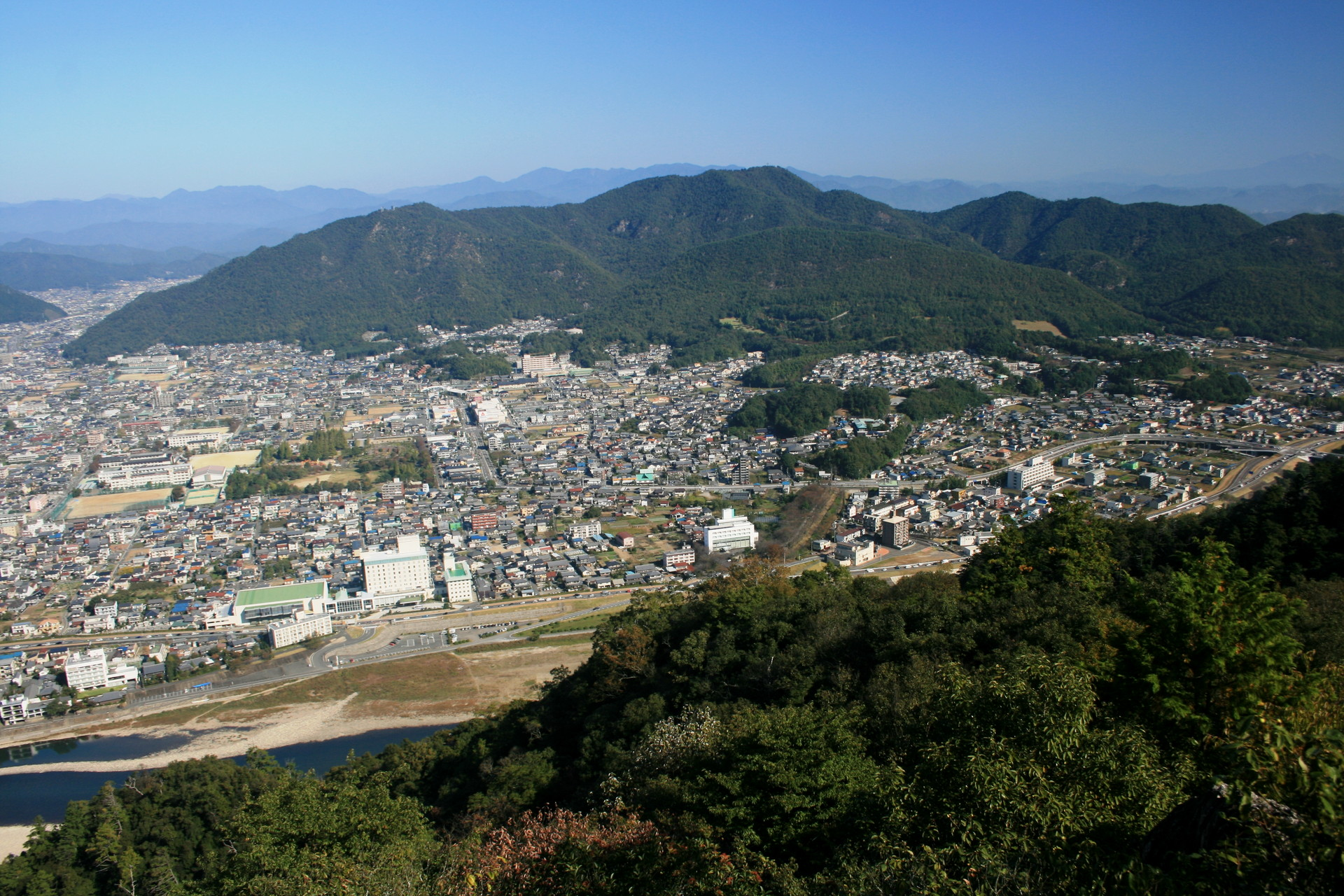
- Mt. Dodo from Mount Kinka

Highest point
- Elevation: 417.9 m (1,371 ft)

Geography
- Location: Gifu, Gifu Prefecture, Japan

Mount Dodo (百々ヶ峰, Dodo-ga-mine), or Mount Dodogamine, is located in the northern part of the city of Gifu, Gifu Prefecture, Japan it is 417.9 m (1,371 ft) in height, making it the tallest mountain in the city. The mountain's small valley includes Matsuo Pond and Hagi Falls.

== Reaching the summit ==
There are six routes for reaching the summit:

- Mitahora Kōbō Route (三田洞弘法ルート)
- Matsuo Pond Route (松尾池ルート Matsuoike Rūto)
- Shōrai Danchi Route (松籟団地ルート)
- Nishiyama Yongō-fun Route (西山4号墳ルート)
- Nishiyama Danchi Route (西山団地ルート)
- Suwa Shrine Route (諏訪神社ルート Suwa Jinja Rūto)

The Tōkai Nature Path (東海自然歩道 Tōkai Shizen Hodō) runs through Mount Dodo, using different routes to climb up and down the mountain.

== Summit attractions ==
- Mount Haku Observatory (白山展望台 Hakusan Tenbōdai)
- Nagara River Observatory (長良川展望台 Nagaragawa Tenbōdai)
