= Ozeki =

Ozeki or Ōzeki may refer to:

- Ōzeki, a rank in Makuuchi, the top division of professional sumo
  - List of ōzeki
- Ozeki (surname)
- Ōzeki station (disambiguation), the name of two railway stations in Japan
- Ōzeki lantern company, Gifu manufacturer of Akari lighting sculptures designed by Isamu Noguchi
- Ōzeki Masutoshi (1849–1905), 16th daimyō of Kurobane Domain in Shimotsuke Province, Japan
- Shinya Ozeki, a character in the manga series Hinomaru Sumo
- 10760 Ozeki, a minor planet
