= Gifu lanterns =

Traditional product of Gifu city, Japan

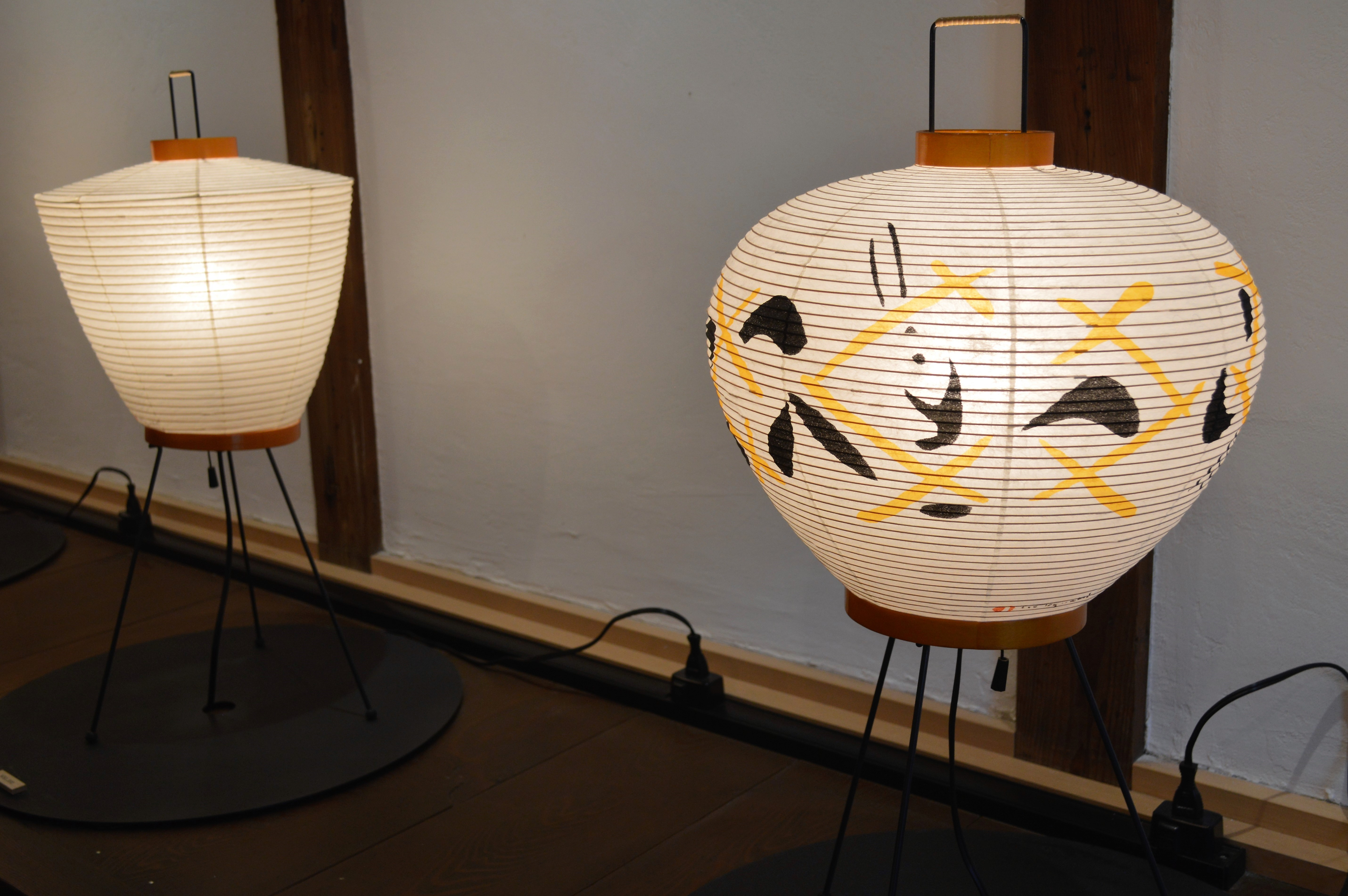
Gifu lanterns

Gifu lanterns (岐阜提灯, Gifu Chōchin), or Gifu paper lanterns, are a special product of the city of Gifu in Gifu Prefecture, Japan. They have been labeled as one of Gifu's traditional crafts. Famed artist Isamu Noguchi designed a series of Gifu Lanterns that were entitled Akari, meaning "light."

== History ==
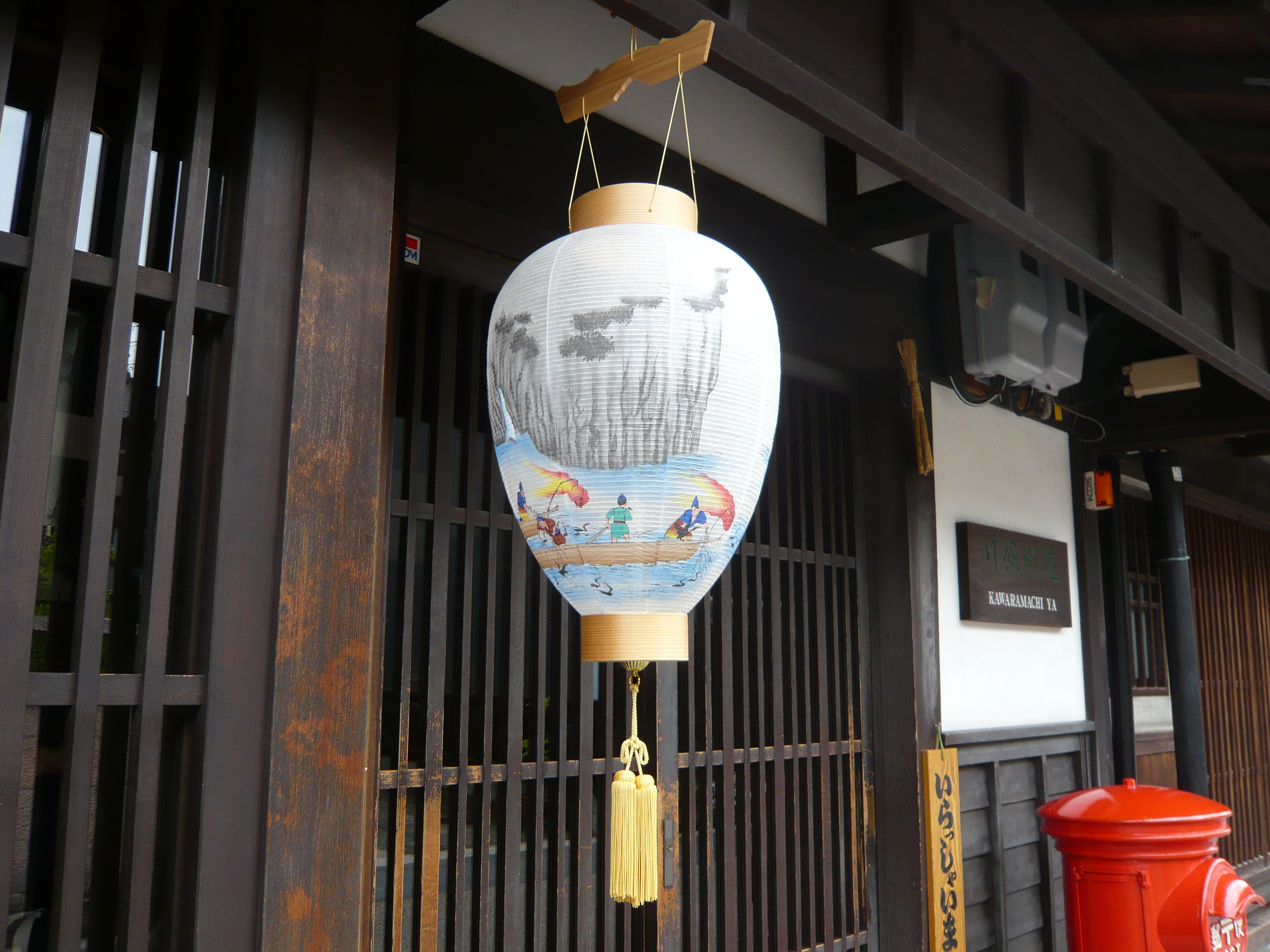
Gifu lantern

There are records of Gifu Lanterns stretching back to the Keichō and Keian eras of Japanese history, which stretched from the late-16th century to the mid-17th century. At the time, they were goods presented to the Owari Domain, rulers of the area at the time.

The modern shape of the lanterns first appeared during the Hōreki era in the mid-18th century, and the lanterns' coloration became standardized during the Bunsei era in the early-19th century.

On April 5, 1995, Gifu Lanterns were designated a traditional craft by the Ministry of International Trade and Industry, the predecessor to the Ministry of Economy, Trade and Industry. The area eventually received a brandmark for its products in October 2006.

== Isamu Noguchi ==
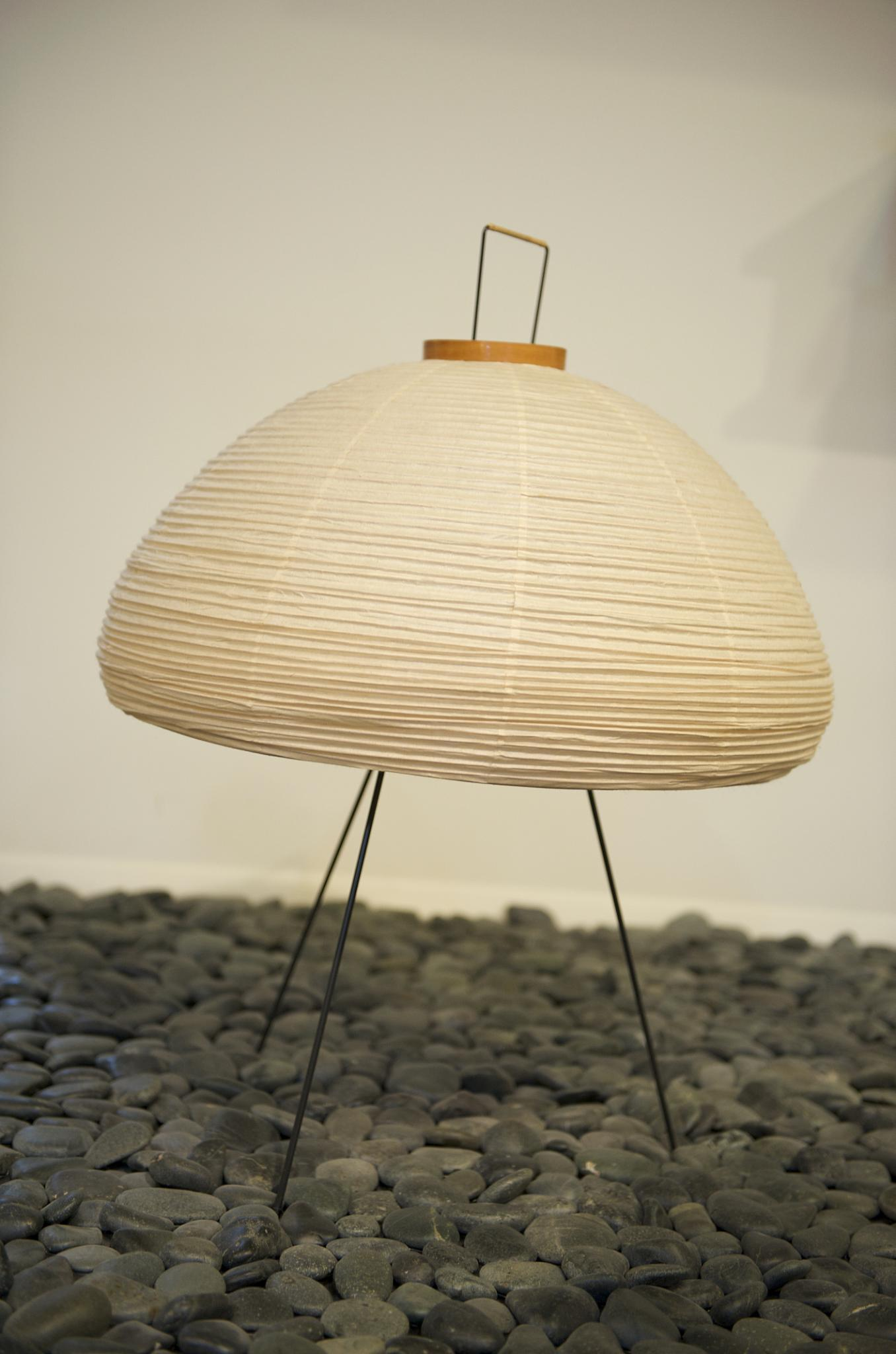
Mino washi Akari light sculpture by Isamu Noguchi (1950s)

Noguchi began designing the Akari light sculptures series in 1951. When describing the beauty of the lanterns, he said:

The light of AKARI is like the light of the sun filtered thru [sic] the paper of shoji. The hardness of electricity is thus transformed thru [sic] the magic of paper back to the light of our origin—the sun—so that its warmth may continue to fill our rooms at night.

== Features ==
Gifu Lanterns are built around a thin frame and layered with pieces of Mino washi. The paper can either be plain, showing off the flickers of light, or decorated to show a scene or design.

Because many of the lanterns are still made by hand, there are three main skills used during production, often by different people. The three skills are hari (張り), surikomi (擦り込み) and moriage (盛り上げ). Hari is when the paper is attached to the frame. Surikomi is designs are added to the paper. Moriage is applying powder to the wooden portions of the frame that remain exposed.

== See also ==
- Akari (lamp)
- Mino washi
- Gifu umbrellas
- Gifu fans
- Ozeki Lanterns, Co., Ltd. (in Japanese)
- Traditional lighting equipment of Japan
