= Bruno Aveillan =

French film director (born 1968)

- Born: 24 February 1968; Toulouse, France
- Education: Institut supérieur des arts de Toulouse
- Occupations: Film director, photographer, visual artist
- Awards: Chevalier of the Ordre des Arts et des Lettres (2026)

Bruno Aveillan (born 24 February 1968 in Toulouse) is a French film director, photographer and visual artist. He works in commercial filmmaking and also makes photographs, experimental films and installations.

== Biography ==
Aveillan studied fine arts in Perpignan and Toulouse. His initial training was in painting, before he moved towards photography and filmmaking. After working in graphic design and art direction, he became a director at the production company Quad in 1995.

Commentary on Aveillan's commercial films has frequently addressed their use of light, physical textures, movement and indirect narrative devices. Analyses of individual films have appeared in the industry publications CB News, Boards, Lürzer's Archive, Kromag and Shots.

In a 2012 editorial for the French art magazine L'Œil, Anne-Cécile Sanchez discussed his view that commissioned films and personal artistic projects inform one another.

Aveillan was appointed a Chevalier (Knight) of the Ordre des Arts et des Lettres by an order dated 21 September 2026, issued by French Minister of Culture Catherine Pégard.

== Commissioned films ==
=== Early work ===
In 1997, Aveillan directed a Perrier commercial known as La Foule, using Édith Piaf's song of that name. Its visual conceit involved figures leaving posters and becoming part of a celebration. Jean Ségura discussed the combination of live action and digital effects in Broadcast, while Libération critic Gérard Lefort compared the film to the world of Georges Méliès.

The Musée des Arts Décoratifs catalogues the Perrier film as Le Café (1997). Its 2009 annual report also lists other works by Aveillan in its collection, including Les 5 sens, Floating and Where will life take you?.

In 1999, succeeding the directors Lars von Trier and Roland Joffé, Aveillan directed the new episode in the saga for CNP. Additionally, he directed the launch for Lanvin perfume "Oxygène". It is during this spot that Gisele Bündchen makes her debut on screen. During his career Aveillan has also filmed world-renowned actresses and models such as Monica Bellucci, Rachel Weisz, Freida Pinto, Julia Roberts, Claudia Schiffer, Karlie Kloss, Liya Kebede, Sharon Stone, Milla Jovovich, Leila Bekhti.

In 2001, he was one of four directors chosen to make films for the launch of the Orange brand in France, alongside Martin Scorsese, Wong Kar-wai and Oliver Stone.

=== International work and sensory imagery ===
In the early 2000s, Aveillan directed commercials in the United States for the hair-care brand Thermasilk. Writing in The New York Times in May 2000, Patricia Winters Lauro described the use of fantasy characters and special effects in these campaigns. A related film, The Dagger, was discussed in the trade magazine Boards in 2001.

Aveillan made 5 Senses for Magnum in 2005. Lürzer's Archive examined how its close-ups and surfaces conveyed sensation, while Stéphane Zissu subsequently considered the use of slow motion, movement and materiality in the director's work for Kromag.

=== Brand films and cinematic narratives ===
In 2008, Aveillan directed A Journey, also identified with the slogan Where will life take you?, for Louis Vuitton. It was the fashion house's first institutional advertising film intended for television and cinemas. Reporting for the International Herald Tribune, Eric Pfanner noted that the campaign emphasised the idea of travel rather than displaying products. In Libération Next, Clément Ghys discussed the film's subdued road-movie atmosphere and compared it with the imagery of the Coen brothers' No Country for Old Men. The music was composed by Gustavo Santaolalla.

A Journey has also been analysed in academic writing. Barbara Flueckiger considered blur, lighting and colour in its sensory presentation; Hertez Wendel de Camargo studied the relationship between the film, myth and the journey motif; and Ana Cláudia de Oliveira and Luciane Robic examined it from a semiotic perspective.

His 2010 short film It's in Our Nature, commissioned by Shangri-La Hotels and Resorts, depicts a traveller in a snowy landscape who is rescued by wolves. The campaign uses a fable to represent hospitality rather than focusing on hotel interiors or services.

In 2012, Aveillan directed L'Odyssée, a three-and-a-half-minute film for Cartier following a panther, the house's emblem, on a fantastical journey. The short film, which chronicles Cartier's 165-year history, was first screened at The Metropolitan Museum of Art in New York City on 29 February 2012. In the academic journal Itinéraires, Ambre Abid-Dalençon studied the film's combination of epic, fantastical and dreamlike narrative modes. Aveillan subsequently directed Cartier's Shape Your Time (2014), which received a Grand Prix Stratégies/Amaury Médias du luxe in 2015. According to Stratégies, the earlier film had received 42 international awards and 160 million views at the time of the article.

In 2013, he made La Légende de Shalimar for Guerlain. The commercial ranked fifth on Google's list of the most popular YouTube advertisements in France for August 2013, as reported by Stratégies. It received three awards at Eurobest 2013, including gold for visual effects, and awards for direction and cinematography at the 2015 Bokeh International Fashion Film Festival. The theatrical screening of its extended version prompted mixed responses, particularly concerning its length; Michel Guerrin covered the reactions in Le Monde.

In 2019, Aveillan directed Éternels, a cinematic advertising film for the French historical theme park Puy du Fou. Shots reported on the six-day production, which used the park's sets, costumes and stunt performers.

In 2024, he directed an international launch film for the Renault 5 E-Tech Electric. Amy Hey's review in Shots discussed its allusions to the French New Wave and French touch, as well as the changes in its photographic and painterly effects across the periods depicted.

== Feature-film projects ==
In the early 2000s, French film producer Claude Berri approached Bruno Aveillan with a proposal to direct a feature-film adaptation of Cinderella. At the time, Berri praised the director's visual approach in Le Film français, declaring: "Since Jean-Jacques Annaud, I have never encountered such visual talent", and comparing Aveillan's potential to that of Tim Burton.

Aveillan developed a personal reinterpretation of the fairy tale, but the project was eventually abandoned following Berri's death in 2009. It was subsequently revived in Hollywood with Universal Pictures. In September 2011, Variety reported that Aveillan was attached to direct the film, with Ann Peacock in negotiations to write a new screenplay.

In August 2015, industry publications reported that Paramount Pictures had selected him to direct a proposed sequel to Hansel & Gretel: Witch Hunters. Neither project was subsequently documented as completed.

In May 2025, during the Cannes Film Festival, Aveillan was announced as the director of Polaris, a science-fiction feature film adapted from the French role-playing game created by Philippe Tessier. Produced by Nicolas Bary through TimpelPictures, the project is set in a post-apocalyptic future in which humanity has taken refuge beneath the oceans following environmental catastrophes. Conceived as an English-language production with an international cast, the film was in development and seeking international partners at the time of its announcement.

== Visual art ==
Alongside his work in commissioned filmmaking, Aveillan has developed a practice encompassing photography, experimental film and installation art. His photographic work has been discussed in relation to memory, the fragmentation of images and the movement between representation and abstraction.

In 2001, he took part in Parcours 23, a group exhibition featuring photography and video, presenting an installation combining the experimental film Minotaur-Ex with eight photographs. Writing in Technikart, Alexandra Benardeau drew attention to its forceful imagery of bodies colliding and undergoing transformations. The film subsequently received awards at the 2004 Festival international du film d'art et de vidéo (FIFAV) in Montpellier, was recognised by the Dance Films Association's Dance on Camera programme in 2007, and was presented at LOOP Barcelona in 2013.

In 2008, Aveillan exhibited Diotopes at Galerie Léo Scheer in Paris. An accompanying photographic monograph appeared in the publisher's Janvier series. In Shots, Stephen Whelan examined the role of recollection and fragmented perception in the work, observing how its blurred or partially disclosed forms move towards abstraction rather than conventional photographic description.

The series Bolshoi Underground, made backstage at Moscow's Bolshoi Theatre, was exhibited in Paris in 2012. In Télérama, Bénédicte Philippe described Aveillan as a "poet of light" and emphasised the unobtrusive character of his approach. Rather than focusing on theatrical spectacle, she drew attention to the atmosphere of silence, waiting and concentration among performers preparing for the stage. Writing in Le Nouvel Observateur, Céline Cabourg characterised the photographs as being built up in "painterly touches", between blur and clarity. She noted the use of fragments of bodies and theatrical spaces instead of an overall view of the Bolshoi, creating a more allusive representation of its backstage world.

Between 2011 and 2014, Galerie Spree presented Aveillan's work at editions of the Cutlog contemporary-art fair. The catalogue for the 2011 Paris edition, held at the Bourse de Commerce, reproduced L'Évidence, a work measuring 140 by 140 centimetres. At the 2012 edition, art critic Barbara Sabaté Montoriol singled out portraits from Acetate Spirit, describing their sfumato effects and the sense of visual ambiguity they produced. Reviewing the 2013 Paris edition for The Huffington Post, art historian Julie Chaizemartin praised the subtlety of two Aveillan photographs, comparing the delicacy of their treatment to the work of Gerhard Richter. His experimental film Papillon was presented at Cutlog New York in 2014, at The Clemente cultural centre in Manhattan.

The 2014 Milan exhibition Bolshoi Underground & altre storie, curated by Francesco Gattuso at Galleria Centro Steccata, brought together photographs from several series. In the Gazzetta di Parma, Stefania Provinciali identified light, dance, the human body and absence as recurrent concerns in Aveillan's work, connecting them to his experiments with movement and illumination in film. Ginevra Bria, writing in Artribune, drew attention to the technical finish of the prints and the deliberate choice of colour temperatures. She described dancers' bodies and faces appearing to dissolve into chromatic gradations, with recognisable subjects giving way to a more abstract perception of space.

In 2015, the retrospective #Flashback was held at the Couvent des Minimes in Perpignan, bringing together photographs, installations and experimental films. Its selection included earlier series such as Diotopes, Mnemo#Lux, Bolshoi Underground, Acetate Spirit and Isolation Ceremony, alongside previously unexhibited photographs and screenings of Minotaur-Ex, W.H.E.A.T., Morpholab, Papillon and NOIR. The exhibition was also covered by Julien Marion in L'Indépendant, Anne-Claire Meffre in Madame Figaro and Paris Match, with commentary on the fragmentation of the photographic image, diffuse light and the relationship between Aveillan's photographic and cinematic practices.

The visual-art dimension of Aveillan's filmmaking also attracted critical attention with the broadcast of Divino Inferno (Et Rodin créa la Porte de l'Enfer) in 2017, a documentary exploring the creation of The Gates of Hell by Auguste Rodin. Writing in Le Monde, Joël Morio described Aveillan as a "visual artist" (artiste plasticien) and highlighted the film's highly aestheticised imagery, combining dance, poetry and literature. He considered that this artistic approach made the documentary a "unique work" (un objet unique), reflecting the singular nature of Rodin's masterpiece. In Télérama, François Ekchajzer praised the documentary's ambitious visual approach, describing its docufiction format as particularly suited to conveying the sensuality and vitality of Rodin's sculptures. He emphasised Aveillan's use of dancers covered in clay or plaster, whose movements overcome the limitations of the two-dimensional screen and restore a physical presence to the sculpted figures. Ekchajzer regarded the integration of dance as one of the film's major achievements, noting that it avoids a static, museum-like representation of Rodin's work and brings the sculptures vividly to life.

In 2023, a group of 25 limited-edition photographic prints by Aveillan entered the collections of the Musée Rodin in Paris. In the publication +Photographie #6: Les acquisitions des collections publiques (2025), the museum's photography curator Cyrielle Durox documented the acquisition and reproduced the work Blue Thoughts. The museum associates these photographs with the research, location scouting and visual experiments undertaken for Divino Inferno.

In 2024, Aveillan exhibited the experimental film La Symphonie du Trois (Triades) in Shanghai in connection with the Trinity centenary project curated by Jérôme Sans. Later that year, the photographic and moving-image installation Résonances was presented at BUND 33 as a specially commissioned part of Résonances Art Déco: Paris Chic – Shanghai Moderne (8 November 2024 – 16 February 2025). The work combined experimental film with contemporary photography to address connections between Paris and Shanghai through Art Deco, movement and the built environment. Shanghai Daily described Résonances as a distinct section of the exhibition, commissioned by organiser Hantang Culture.

From 9 June to 26 September 2026, Aveillan presented SUMO, Forces sacrées at the Maison de la culture du Japon à Paris. The photographs resulted from his June 2025 immersion in the Naruto-beya sumo stable, directed by former ōzeki Kotoōshū Katsunori. The exhibition explored the discipline through the wrestlers' bodies, daily gestures and rituals, rather than through competition alone. In Fisheye, Esther Baudoin contrasted the physical intensity of morning training with the suspended time of afternoons devoted to care, rest and meditation. She also discussed how shadow and light lend the wrestlers' bodies a sculptural, almost spiritual presence. Stéphane Jarno covered the exhibition in Télérama in the context of the renewed public interest in sumo surrounding the Paris tournament of June 2026. On 16 September 2026, Télérama Sortir selected SUMO, Forces sacrées for its Le choix de la semaine ("Pick of the Week") feature. In her review, Marie-Anne Kleiber drew attention to the strength of the compositions, the use of light and the striking impression of silence conveyed by the photographs, while noting the limited explanatory material accompanying the exhibition.

== Social-awareness work ==
Aveillan has directed awareness campaigns for organisations including Reporters Without Borders, UNICEF and French food banks. He has supported the film category of the Mlle Pitch Awards, a French creative competition for public-interest campaigns, since its first edition in 2021.

In 2016, he directed Tous touchés for the French road-safety authority. Its four films collectively received numerous advertising awards, including six bronze awards at the Cannes Lions International Festival of Creativity and a silver Eurobest award.

In 2023, he participated in the collective production of Le Premier Cri, a short film honouring Mahsa Amini and expressing support for Iranian women, featuring Zar Amir Ebrahimi's voice in French and Persian.

== Awards ==
- From 1995 to 2017, the awards include: Gold Lion Cannes, AEAF Award, Gold Clio Awards, Golden Globe New York, Grand Prix Stratégie, Art Director Club (France, UK, Italy, Germany), Gold London International Awards, Gold AdFest, TV Gold ADDY's, Gold New York Festival, Toucan d'Or, Art & Technology award, EuroEffies, Ad Masters, European Film Cristal, Gold Eurobest, Ars Electronica, Gold Epica, Grand prix and Gold Mobius award, Gold Werbefilmpreis, Golden award of Montreux, Siggraph, Gold Spike Awards
- 2014, Aveillan received a "Lifetime Achievement Award" at La Jolla International Fashion Film Award à San Diego, for "Global Excellence"

== Selected exhibitions ==
- 2008: Diotopes, Galerie Léo Scheer, Paris; accompanied by a monograph in the Janvier series, including a text by Marcos Lutyens.
- 2010: Mnemo#Lux, Epicentro Artspace, Berlin, in association with Camera Work gallery.
- 2011: Cutlog, Bourse du Commerce, Paris; Galerie Spree presented L'Évidence.
- 2012: Lumières, Impressions, Visa Off Festival, Perpignan (guest of honour).
- 2012: Bolshoi Underground, Galerie Spree, Paris.
- 2012: Cutlog, Bourse du Commerce, Paris; works from the Acetate Spirit series.
- 2013: Minotaur-Ex, LOOP Barcelona.
- 2013: Acetate Spirit, Galerie Spree, Paris.
- 2013: Cutlog, Atelier Richelieu, Paris; photographs including Quatre.
- 2014: Bolshoi Underground & altre storie, Galerie Centro Steccata, Milan; curated by Francesco Gattuso.
- 2014: Cutlog New York, The Clemente, New York; presentation of Papillon.
- 2015: Isolation Ceremony, Multimedia Art Museum, Moscow (MAMM).
- 2015: 3 + 1, Art Paris Art Fair, Grand Palais, Paris.
- 2015: #Flashback, Couvent des Minimes, Perpignan; a retrospective combining photography, experimental films and installations.
- 2026: SUMO, Forces sacrées, Maison de la culture du Japon à Paris, 9 June–26 September.

== Selected publications ==
- Roland Garros par Bruno Aveillan. Éditions de la Martinière. ISBN 9782732475943.
- Flashback. Éditions NOIR.
- Narcisse. Direction de la Culture. ISBN 2910106217.
- IX Moscow International Biennale. GBUKiO (Multimedia Complex of Actual Arts). ISBN 9785939770774.
- Acetate Spirit. Éditions NOIR. ISBN 9782954679204.
- Victor Book 2. Hasselblad.
- Bruno Aveillan: Bolshoi Underground. Éditions Au-delà du raisonnable, Les Littératures visuelles. ISBN 9782919174089.
- Fascinatio. Éditions Higgins, M+M Auer collection.
- Fulguratio. Éditions Higgins, M+M Auer collection.
- Mnemo#Lux. Kerber, PhotoArt collection. ISBN 9783866784635.
- Diotopes. Éditions Léo Scheer, Janvier collection. ISBN 9782756101316.
- Off. ArtFair Brussels, 2012.
- Parcours 23. Studio P.Up.
- Autoportraits. Studio P.Up.
