= Gifu fans =

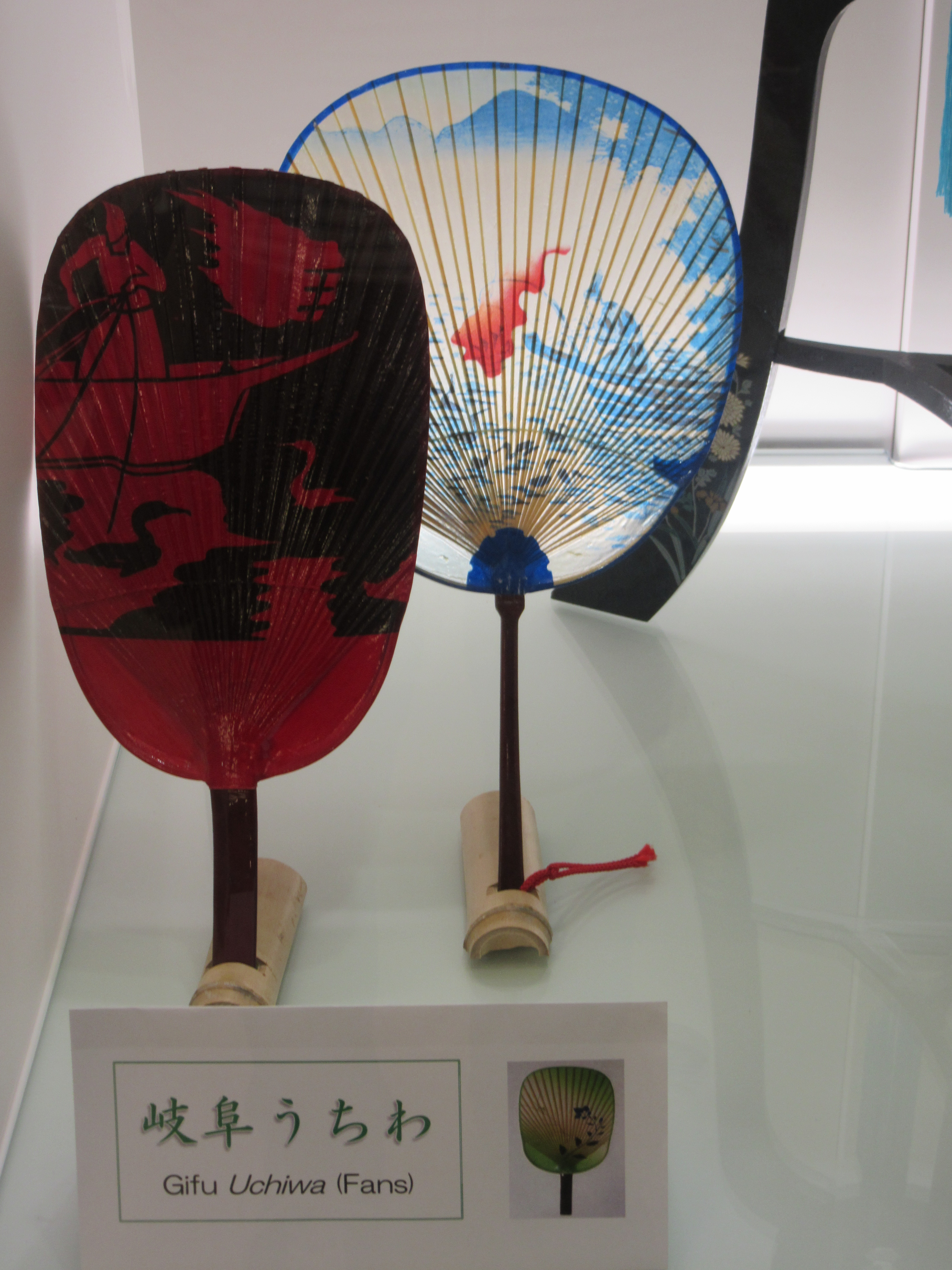
Gifu fans at the Gifu City information centre

Gifu fans (岐阜うちわ, Gifu Uchiwa) are hand-held fans created as a special product of the city of Gifu in Gifu Prefecture, Japan. They have been labeled as one of Gifu's traditional crafts and have a history dating back to the Muromachi period. The fans were first created as omiyage for tourists and visitors to Cormorant Fishing on the Nagara River.

== History ==
The Oyudan no Ue no Nikki (御湯殿上日記), a journal from the Muromachi period, records that Gifu's Zuiryū-ji gave away fans as gifts. A member of the Matsudaira clan officially named the fans Gifu Uchiwa.

Today, over 10,000 fans are produced each year.

== Features ==
Gifu Uchiwa are strong fans, entirely handmade from washi (Japanese paper) and bamboo. The covers for the fans are made using Mino washi, while the base structure is made in more fine detail than the fans made in Marugame and Kyoto. There are over 20 individual steps required to make one fan.

== See also ==
- Mino washi
- Gifu lanterns
- Gifu umbrellas
