= Gifu umbrellas =

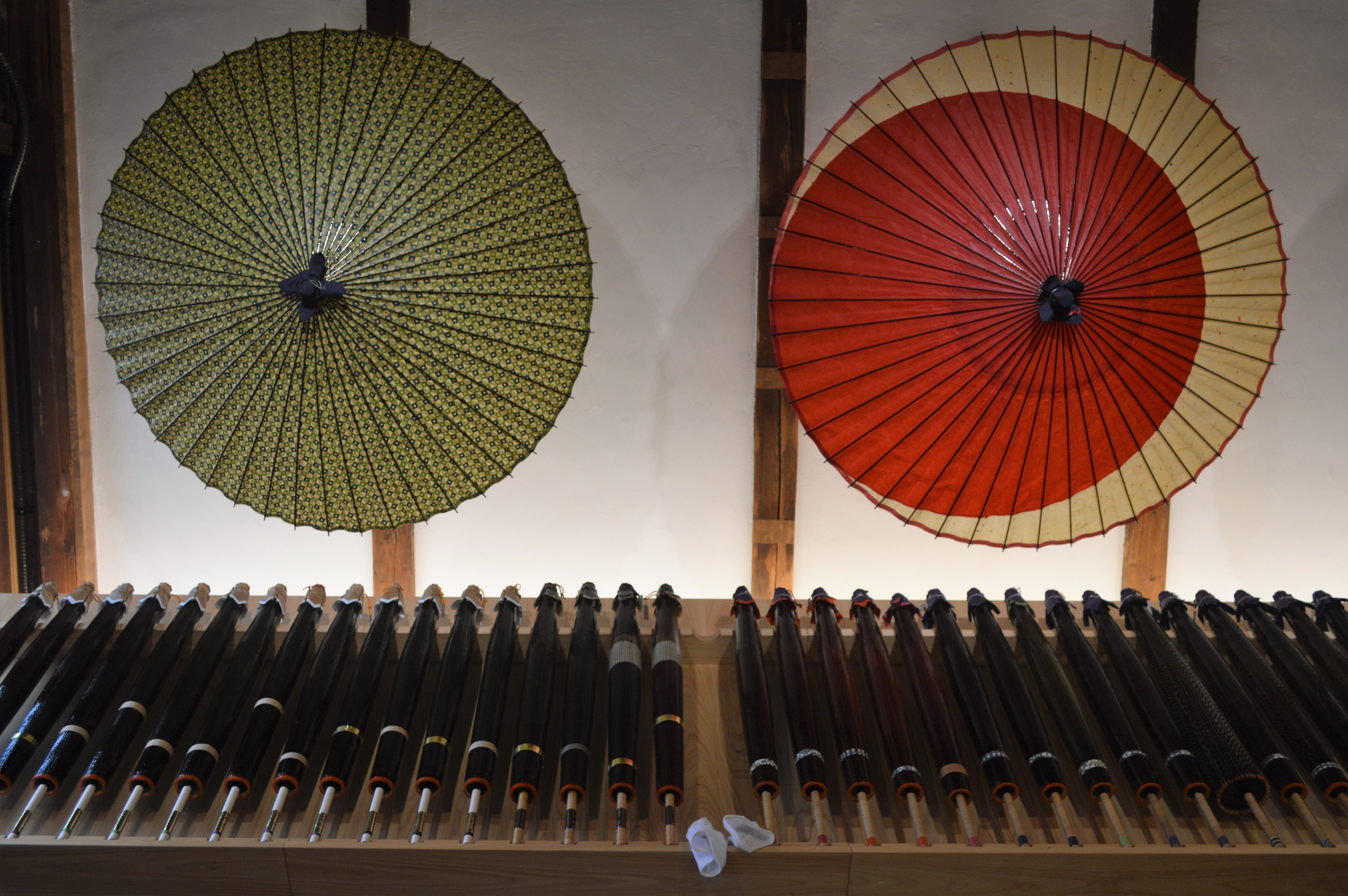
Gifu umbrellas

Gifu umbrellas (岐阜和傘, Gifu Wagasa), or Gifu Japanese umbrellas, are a special product of the city of Gifu in Gifu Prefecture, Japan. They have been labeled as one of Gifu's traditional crafts.

== History ==
In 1639, the Matsudaira clan became rulers of the Kanō Domain and brought with them umbrella artisans from their former home in the Akashi Domain (modern-day Hyōgo Prefecture). By 1756, the umbrellas became more fully developed and the modern shapes and designs first appeared.

== Demand ==
During the end of the Edo period, approximately 520,000 umbrellas were shipped north to Edo each year. By the beginning of the Meiji period, production increased to 12 million umbrellas each year and international sales first began on a widescale. Production continued to increase until its peak during the Shōwa period, which 15 million umbrellas being produced each year, but modern production has dropped to just tens of thousands of umbrellas.

== Features ==
Gifu Umbrellas are made using Mino washi, a strong local paper. A number of natural materials are used in the production process and there are a limited number of people who have the skills to make the umbrellas.

Among traditional crafts in Japan, Gifu Umbrellas are particularly difficult to make with over 100 steps involved from start to finish. Because of all the skills required to make the umbrellas, it would be difficult for one person to make an umbrella through each step.

== Gallery ==
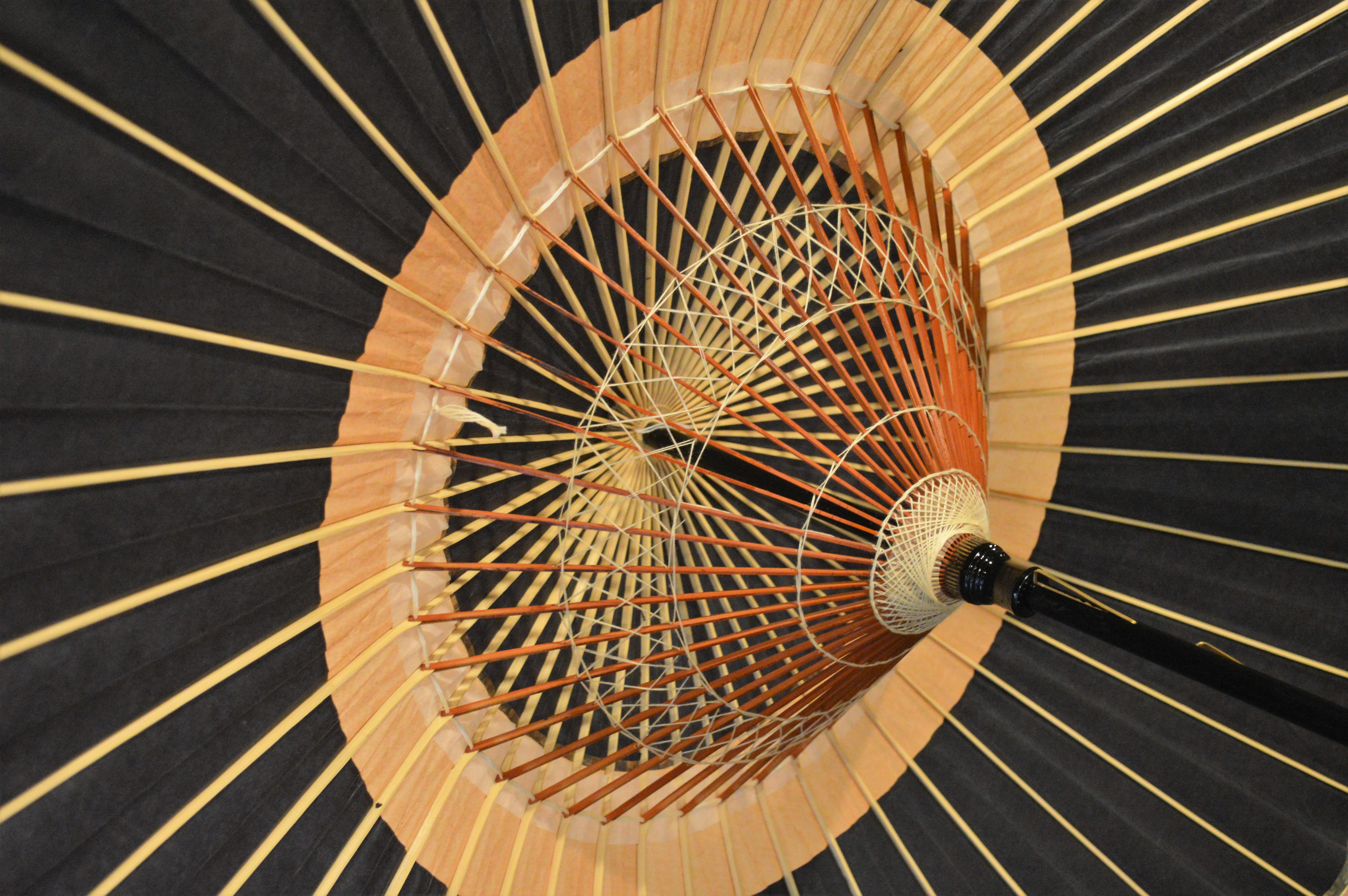

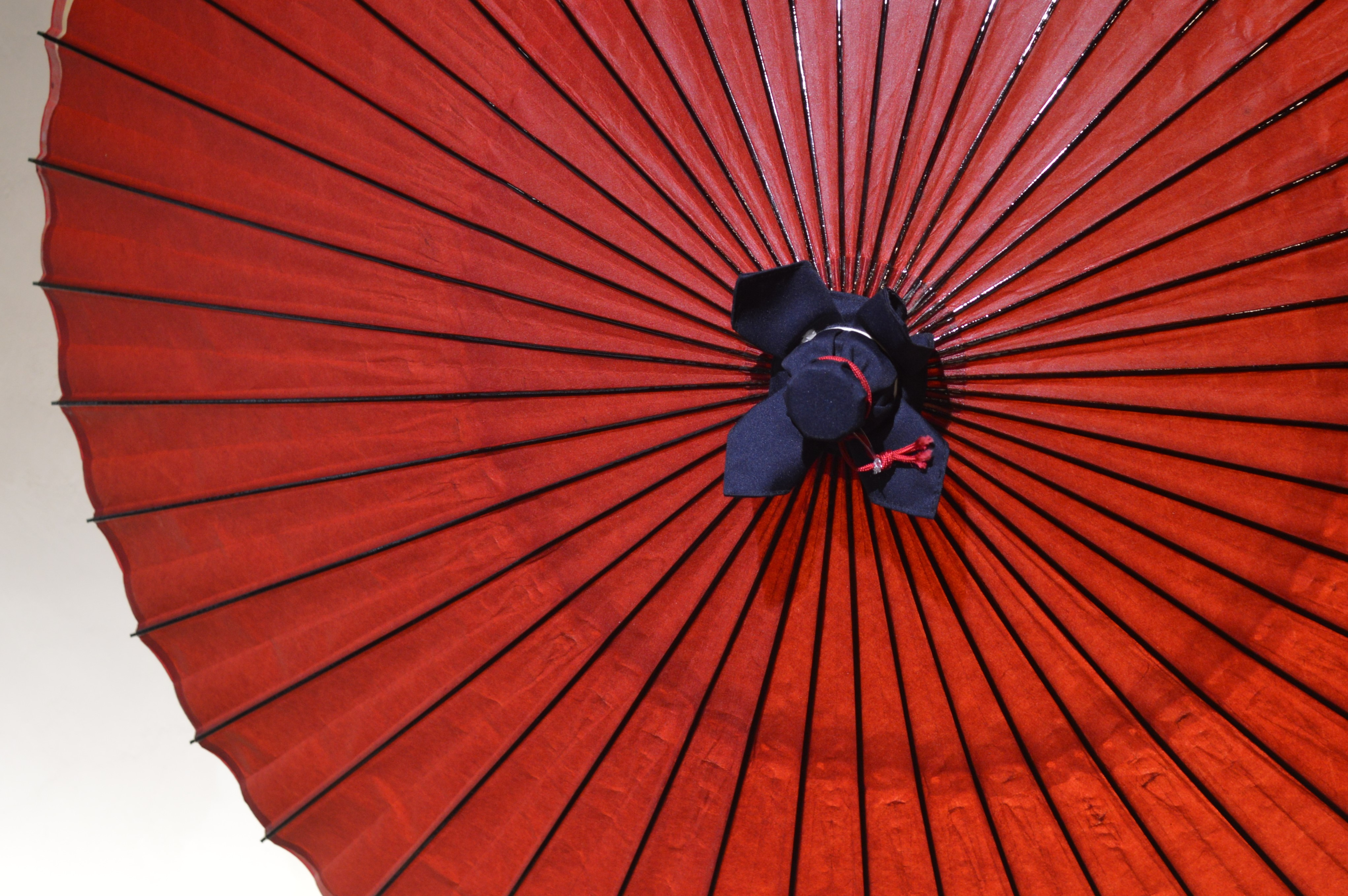

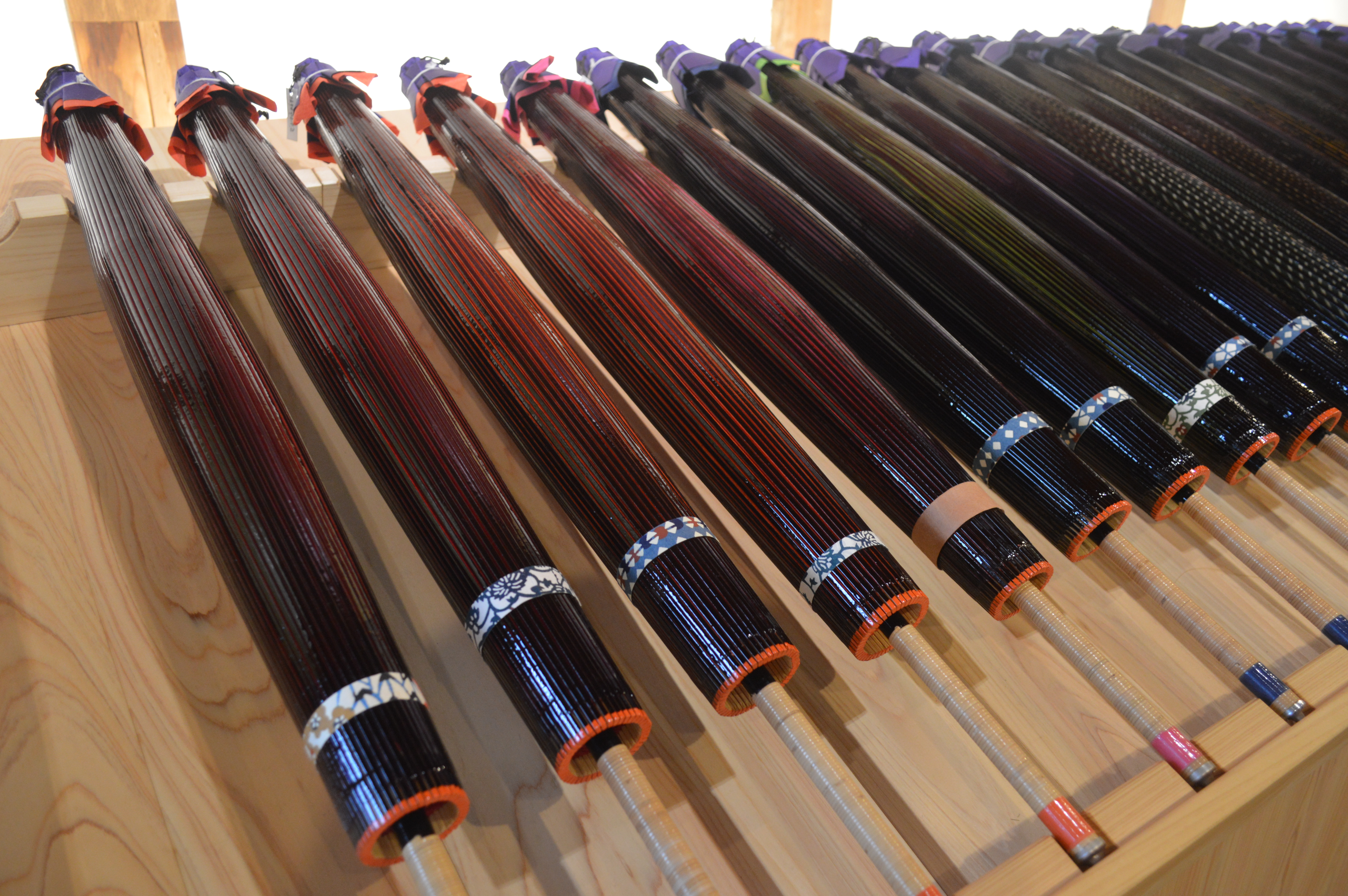

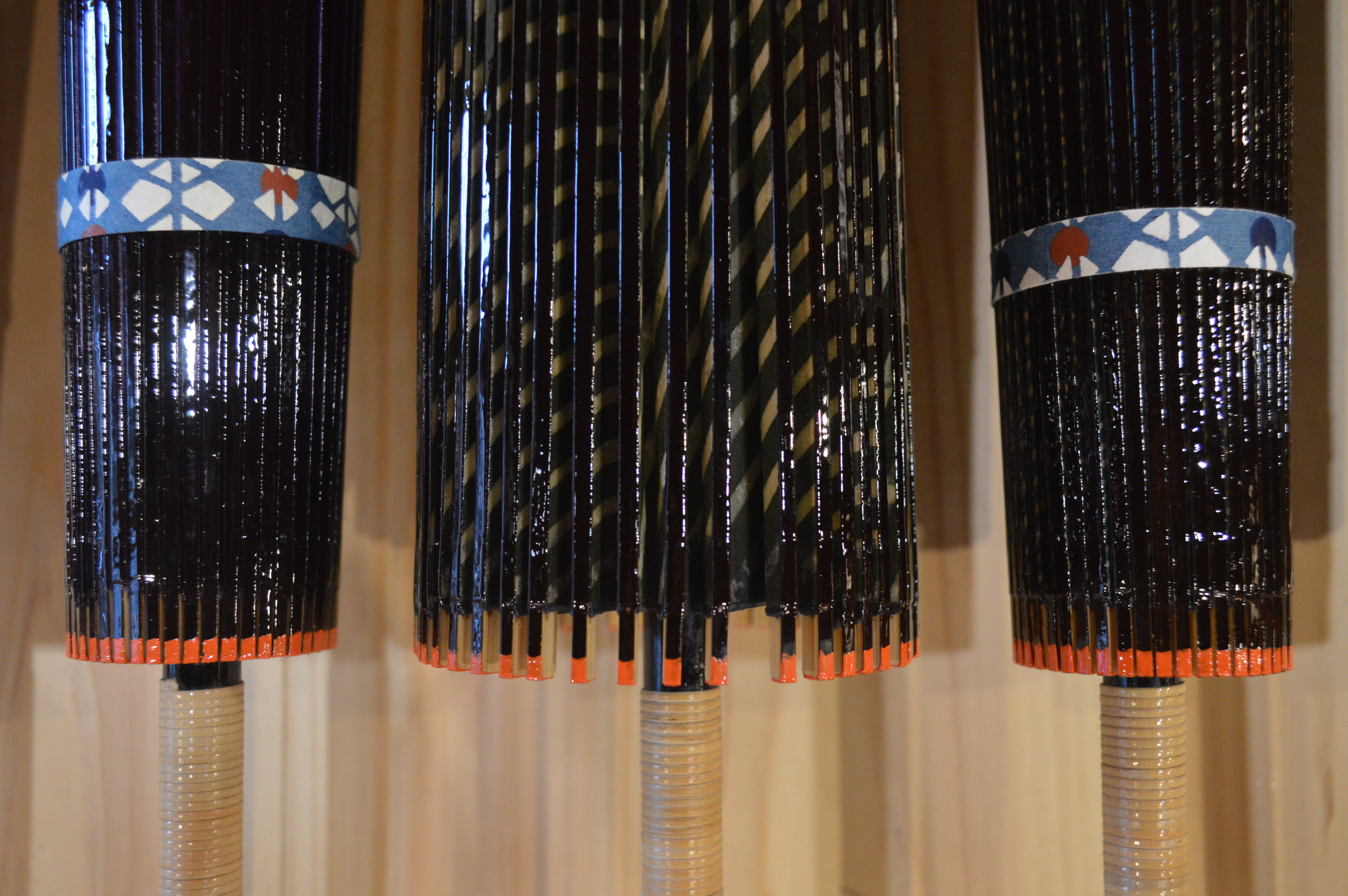

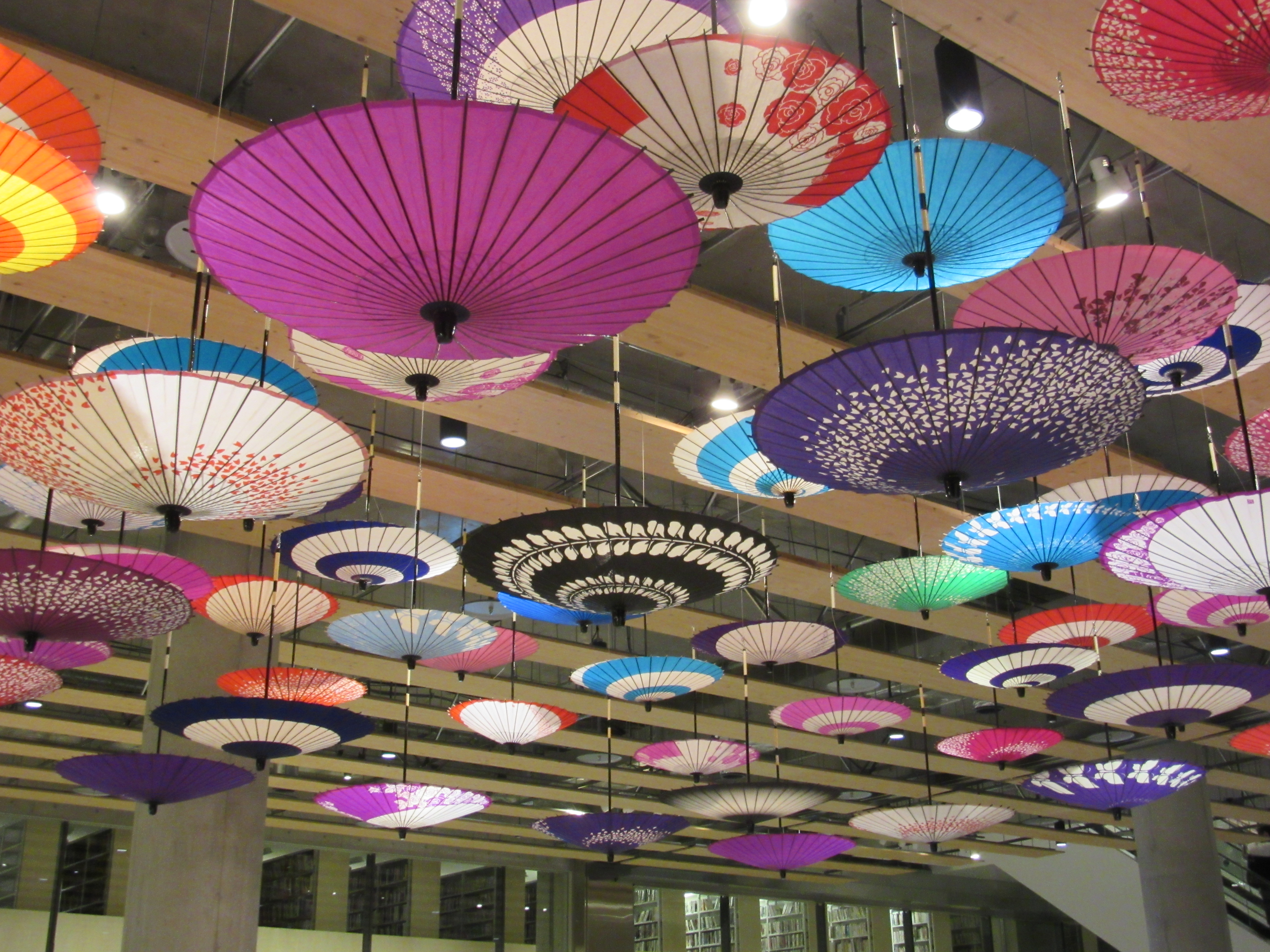

== See also ==
- Gifu lanterns
- Gifu fans
