= Kurobane Domain =

Feudal domain in Edo period Japan

Kurobane Domain 黒羽藩
- under Tokugawa shogunate Japan
- 1596–1871
- Capital: Kurobane jin'ya
- Area
  - Coordinates: 36°52′10″N 140°07′18″E
- Government
  - Type: Daimyō
- Historical era: Edo period
  - Established: 1596
  - Disestablished: 1871
- Today part of: part of Tochigi Prefecture

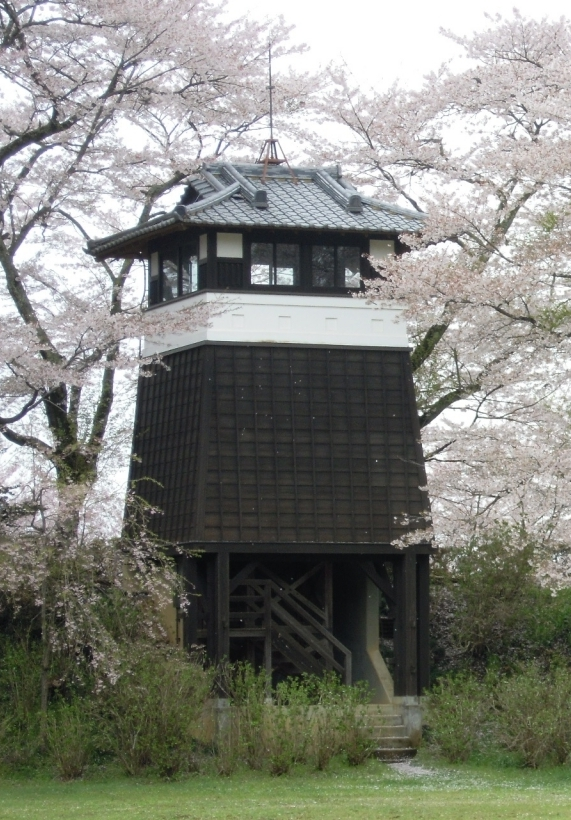
Reconstructed yagura at Kurobane Castle Park, Ōtawara, Tochigi

Kurobane Domain (黒羽藩, Kurobane-han) was a feudal domain under the Tokugawa shogunate of Edo period Japan, located in the Nasu District of Shimotsuke Province (modern-day Tochigi Prefecture), Japan. It was centered on Kurobane jin'ya in what is now part of the city of Ōtawara, Tochigi. Kurobane was ruled through all of its history by the tozama Ōzeki clan.

== History ==
After Tokugawa Ieyasu took control over the Kantō region in 1590, he assigned a 13,000 koku holding in northern Shimotsuke Province to Ōzeki Takamasu, the head of one of the seven leading samurai clans from the area. His son, Ōzeki Sukemasu, fought a rear-guard action against the Uesugi clan in Aizu during the Battle of Sekigahara and was rewarded with an increase in kokudaka to 20,000 koku and was confirmed as daimyō of Kurobane.

Although their residence was styled as a jin'ya, it was built in the former central bailey of the clan’s ancestral Kurobane Castle, which was located on a 50-meter tall hill, with moats, earthen ramparts and yagura watchtowers.

During the time of the 4th daimyō, Ōzeki Masuchika, the domain was divided, with 1000 koku going to each of his two younger brothers. In 1689, the noted haiku poet Matsuo Basho spent 14 day at Kurobane while traveling the Tohoku region and writing the Oku no Hosomichi. This was the longest stay in any one location during his journey. The 15th daimyō, Ōzeki Masuhiro, served in a number of important posts within the Bakumatsu period Tokugawa shogunate, including Kaigun bugyō and wakadoshiyori. He also improved the domain’s military by introducing the Spencer repeating rifle and western military technologies. The 16th and final daimyō, Ōzeki Masatoshi, sided with the Satchō Alliance in the Boshin War of the Meiji Restoration, and fought in the Battle of Aizu.

After the abolition of the han system in July 1871, Kurobane Domain became part of Tochigi Prefecture.

The domain had a population of 19,493 people in 3666 households, of which 1937 were samurai in 638 households per a census in 1870.

== Holdings at the end of the Edo period ==
As with most domains in the han system, Kurobane Domain consisted of several discontinuous territories calculated to provide the assigned kokudaka, based on periodic cadastral surveys and projected agricultural yields.

- Shimotsuke Province
  - 47 villages in Nasu District
  - 7 villages in Haga District

== List of daimyō ==
| # | Name | Tenure | Courtesy title | Court Rank | kokudaka |
|---|---|---|---|---|---|
Ōzeki clan (tozama) 1596–1871
| 1 | Ōzeki Sukemasu (大関資増) | 1596–1605 | -unknown- | unknown - | 20,000 koku |
| 2 | Ōzeki Masamasu (大関政増) | 1606–1615 | -unknown- | -unknown- | 20,000 koku |
| 3 | Ōzeki Takamasu (大関高増) | 1616–1646 | Tosa-no-kami (土佐守) | Junior 5th Rank, Lower Grade (従五位下) | 20,000 koku |
| 4 | Ōzeki Masuchika (大関増親) | 1646–1662 | Tosa-no-kami(土佐守) | Junior 5th Rank, Lower Grade (従五位下) | 20,000 -> 18,000 koku |
| 5 | Ōzeki Masunaga (大関増栄) | 1662–1688 | Shinano-no-kami(信濃守) | Junior 5th Rank, Lower Grade (従五位下) | 18,000 koku |
| 6 | Ōzeki Masutsune (大関増恒) | 1688–1738 | Shinano-no-kami (信濃守) | Junior 5th Rank, Lower Grade (従五位下) | 18,000 koku |
| 7 | Ōzeki Masuoki (大関増興) | 1738–1763 | Iyo-no-kami (伊予守) | Junior 5th Rank, Lower Grade (従五位下) | 18,000 koku |
| 8 | Ōzeki Masutomo (大関増備) | 1763–1764 | Inaba-no-kami (因幡守) | Junior 5th Rank, Lower Grade (従五位下) | 18,000 koku |
| 9 | Ōzeki Masusuke (大関増輔) | 1764–1802 | Iyo-no-kami (伊予守) | Junior 5th Rank, Lower Grade (従五位下) | 18,000 koku |
| 10 | Ōzeki Masuharu (大関増陽) | 1802–1811 | Mimasaku-no-kami (美作守) | Junior 5th Rank, Lower Grade (従五位下) | 18,000 koku |
| 11 | Ōzeki Masunari (大関増業) | 1811–1824 | Tosa-no-kami (土佐守) | Junior 5th Rank, Lower Grade (従五位下) | 18,000 koku |
| 12 | Ōzeki Masunori (大関増儀) | 1824–1848 | Iyo-no-kami (伊予守) | Junior 5th Rank, Lower Grade (従五位下) | 18,000 koku |
| 13 | Ōzeki Masuakira (大関増昭) | 1848–1856 | Shinano-no-kami (信濃守) | Junior 5th Rank, Lower Grade (従五位下) | 18,000 koku |
| 14 | Ōzeki Masuyoshi (大関増徳) | 1856–1861 | Noto-no-kami (能登守) | Junior 5th Rank, Lower Grade (従五位下) | 18,000 koku |
| 15 | Ōzeki Masuhiro (大関増裕) | 1861–1867 | Higo-no-kami (肥後守) | Junior 5th Rank, Lower Grade (従五位下) | 18,000 koku |
| 16 | Ōzeki Masutoshi (大関増勤) | 1867–1871 | Mimasaku-no-kami (美作守) | Junior 5th Rank, Lower Grade (従五位下) | 18,000 koku |
