= Ozeki (surname) =

Ozaki (written: 大関 or おおぜき) is a Japanese surname. Notable people with the surname include:

- Ōzeki Masutoshi (1849–1905), 16th daimyō of Kurobane Domain
- Ruth Ozeki (born 1956), American writer
- Tatsuya Ozeki (born 1976), Japanese baseball player
- Tokiko Ozeki (born 1950), Japanese cross-country skier
- Yukie Ozeki (born 1949), Japanese table tennis player
- Yuto Ozeki (born 2005), Japanese footballer
