= Akari (lamp) =

Line of paper lamps designed by Isamu Noguchi

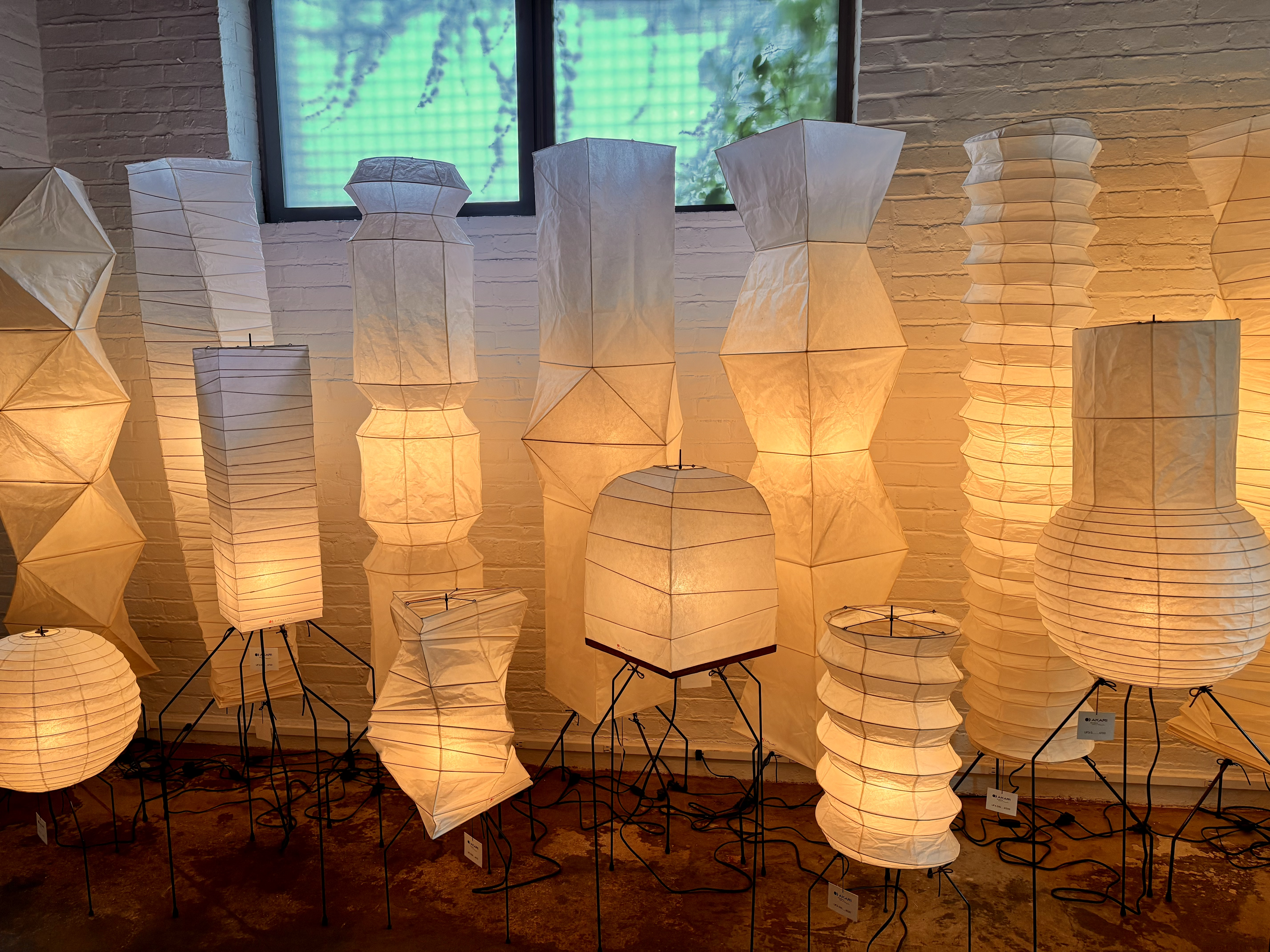
- Akari light sculptures at the Noguchi Museum
- Designer: Isamu Noguchi
- Date: 1951–present
- Made in: Gifu, Japan
- Materials: Washi paper, bamboo, metal
- Style / tradition: Mid-century modern
- Sold by: Ozeki lantern company
- Collection: Akari light sculptures

Akari lamps (Akari light sculptures) are paper lanterns designed by American artist and furniture designer Isamu Noguchi.

The lamps are made of washi paper and bamboo, and have been popular since the 1950s. Akari means "light" ("illumination") in Japanese, and the lamps are a modern version of traditional Japanese lanterns. There are over 200 Akari iterations in different shapes, sizes and colors.

Akari lamps are an example of mid-century modern design.

== History ==
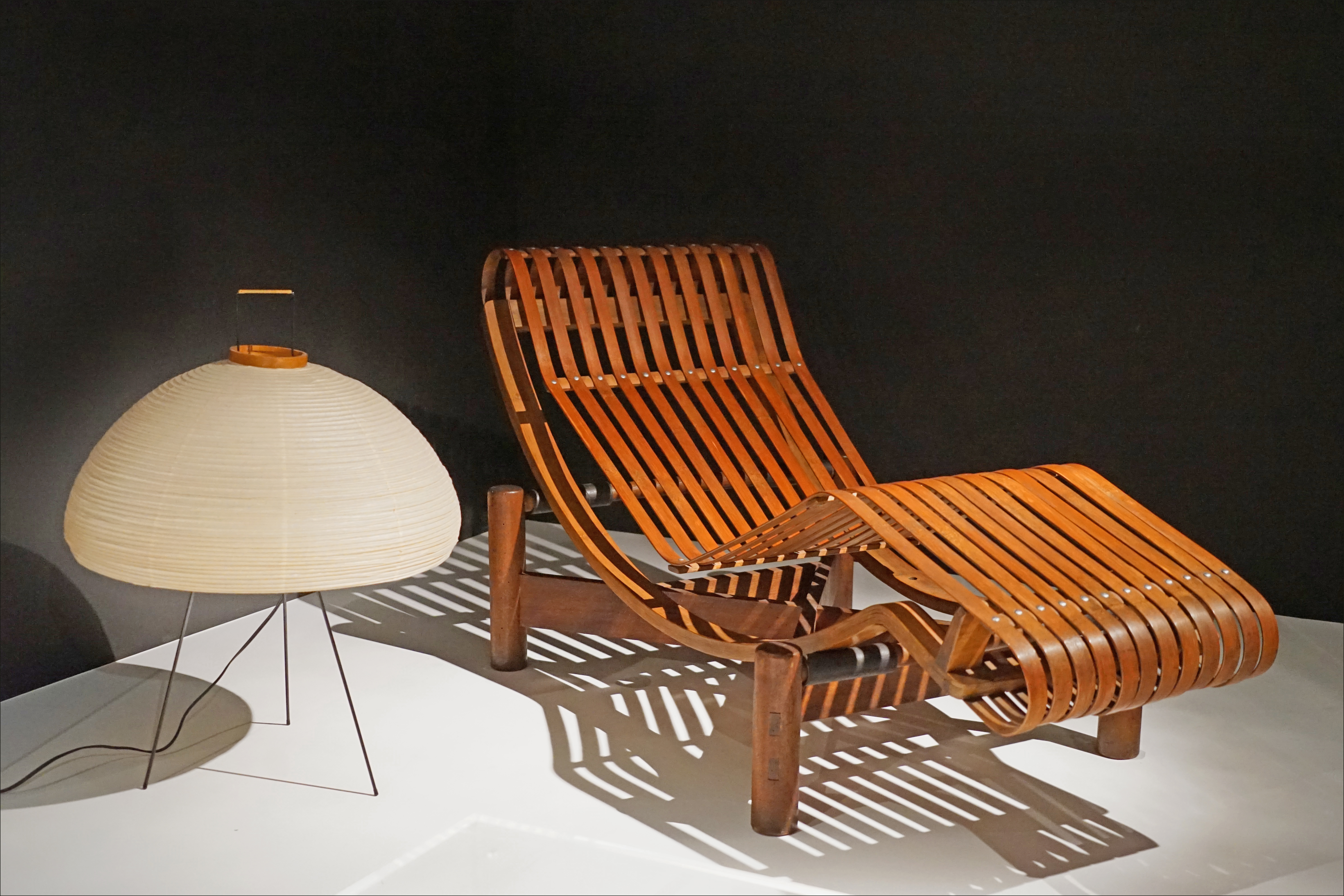
Noguchi's Akari 10A light sculpture displayed with a Charlotte Perriand Tokyo chaise longue in the Musée des Arts Décoratifs, Paris

Isamu Noguchi was born to a Japanese father and American mother, and was raised by his mother in the United States and Japan. He was a well-respected sculptor and artist by the late 1940s, but he struggled financially.

On a trip to Japan in 1951, Noguchi visited Gifu, a town that specialized in making traditional paper lanterns. The mayor of Gifu approached Noguchi and asked him to modernize the lanterns, which were growing obsolete with the rise of electricity. Noguchi did so by redesigning the lamps to use light bulbs rather than candles, and using wire to make the shapes more sculptural.

Noguchi viewed his new lanterns as works of art rather than simple light sources. He called them "Akari light sculptures" and compared the light they emit to "the sun filtered through the paper of shoji". In reference to Jun'ichirō Tanizaki's seminal philosophical essay on Japanese aesthetics In Praise of Shadows, Noguchi mused, "All that you require to start a home are a room, a tatami, and Akari."

They could be easily collapsed and shipped flat, and were an immediate success in Japan and worldwide. The resulting pieces have been exhibited in galleries, widely collected, and are held in many public collections such as the Museum of Modern Art and the Metropolitan Museum in New York, the Musée des Arts Décoratifs in Paris, and the Victoria and Albert Museum in London amongst others. The artist's designs continue to be handmade in Gifu by the original manufacturer, Ozeki & Co.

Generations of architects and designers have drawn inspiration from Noguchi's Akari light sculptures, which have remained the architype for "silent dialogue between Japanese tradition and modernity" since their inception. More recent collaborations with designers such as Barber Osgerby and Sebastian Conran have paid homage to the originals, and been exhibited at international design events such as the London Design Festival, Paris's Maison & Object, as well as the Noguchi Museum itself.

== Design ==
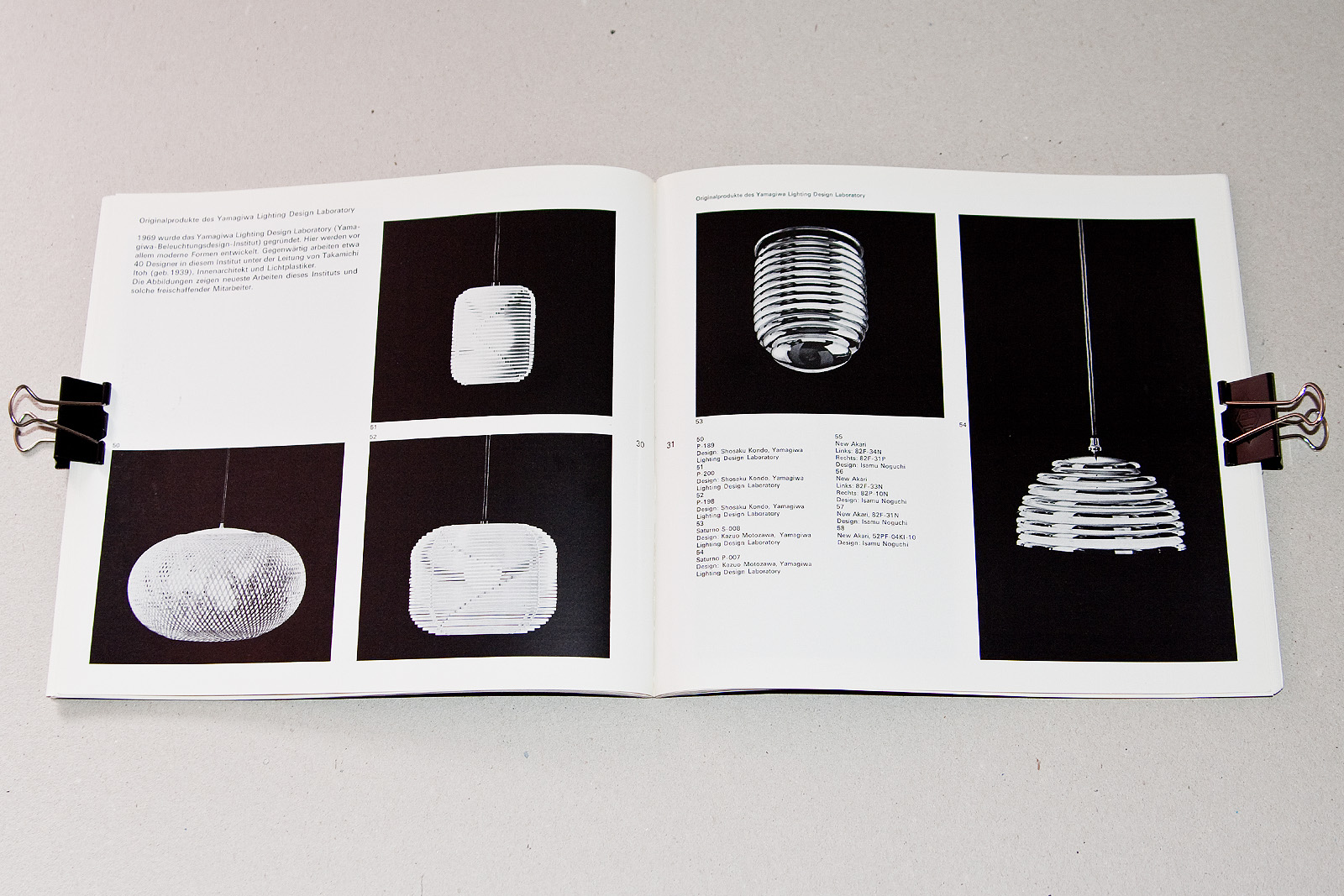
1975 Akari catalogue designed by Josef Müller-Brockmann

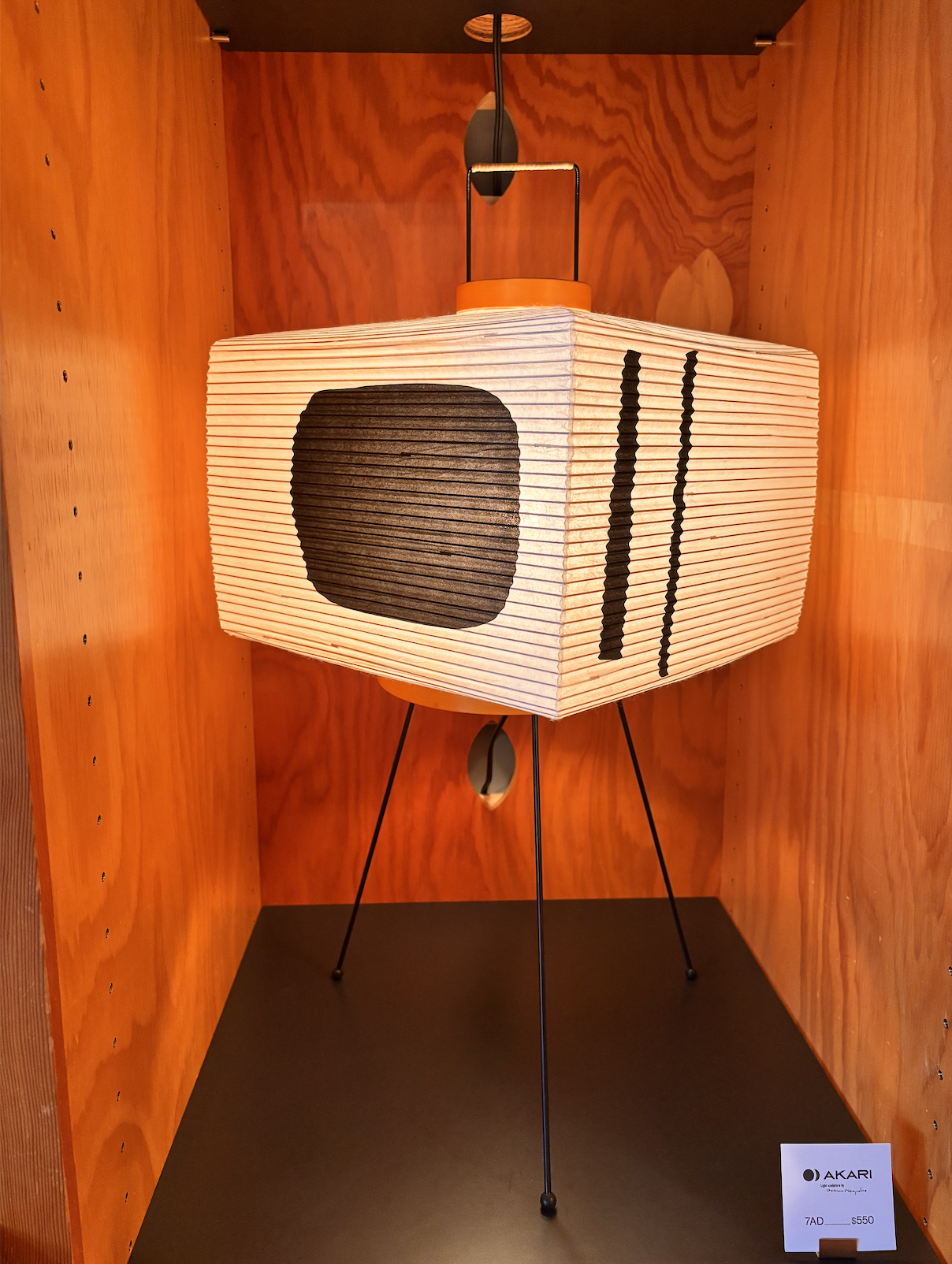
A TV-shaped Akari light sculpture at the Noguchi Museum

Akari lamps are made in Gifu using Mino washi paper, bamboo, and metal. The warm patina of the paper and the lamps' "idiosyncratically sculptural shapes" make them difficult to replicate. To emulate the warm glow of high-end lanterns like Akari, some people dye white lanterns with tea.

The lanterns come in a variety of shapes, from round or rectangular to resembling a banana or a television set.

== Reception ==
Akari lamps have been popular since their advent, and The Strategist called them a "shorthand for taste but not flashiness".

Fans of Akari include painter Georgia O'Keeffe who had an Akari pendant lamp in her New Mexico home and filmmaker Mira Nair, who said in a 2002 The New York Times profile that she owned seven Akari lamps.

A 2021 article by The Strategist profiled 41 Akari owners with photos of the lamps styled in their homes. The owners praised the lamps' coziness and simplicity.

Vintage examples of Noguchi's "light sculptures" are considered collector's items and sell for thousands of dollars at auction.

== See also ==
- Japanese craft – Handicrafts of Japan
- List of Traditional Crafts of Japan
