= Mino washi =

Type of Japanese paper created in Gifu Prefecture, Japan

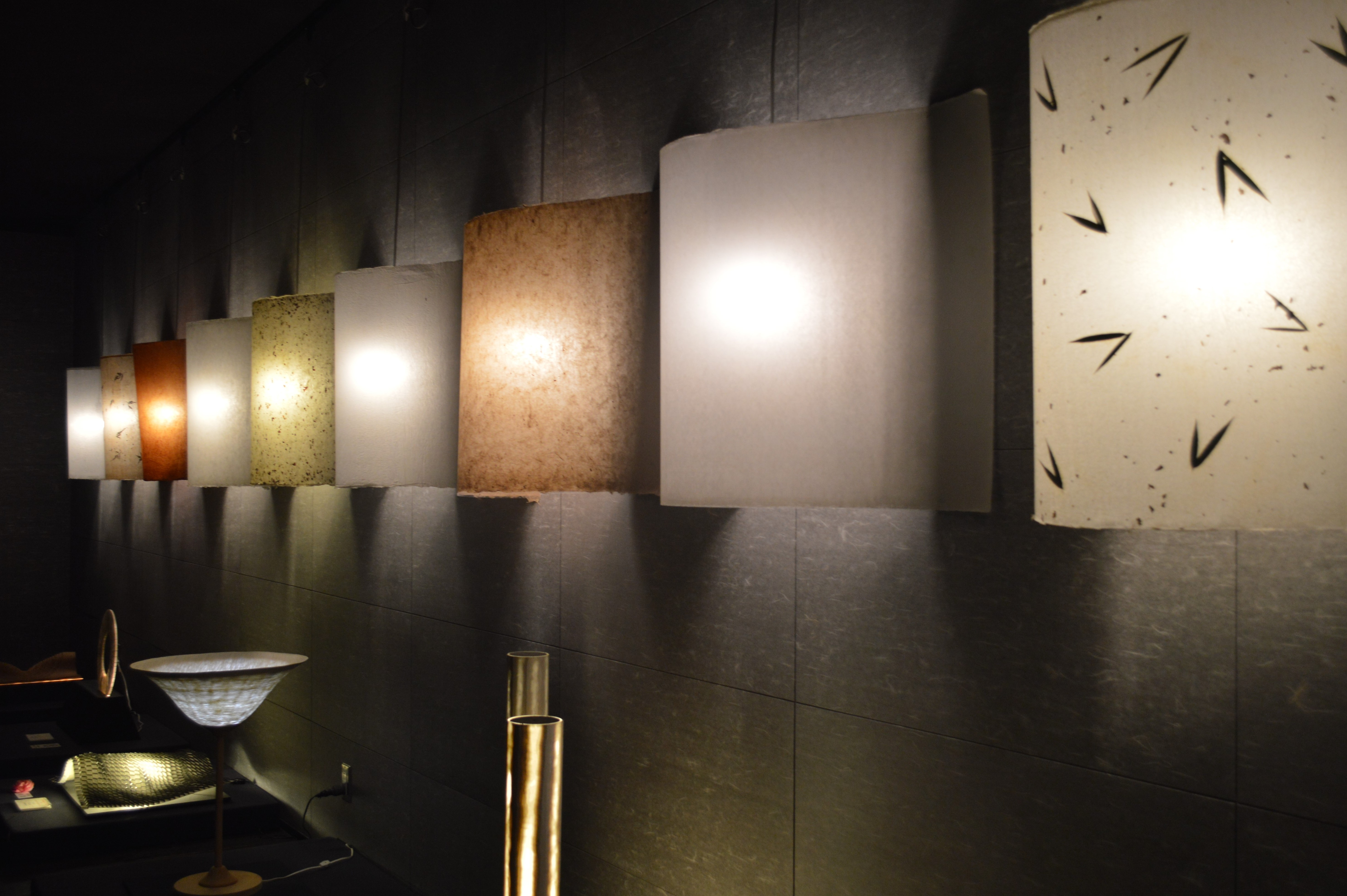
Mino washi

Mino washi (美濃和紙, Mino paper) is a type of Japanese paper created in Gifu Prefecture, Japan. Washi is made from the paper mulberry which is a plant that grows in the city of Mino. In 1985, it was designated a Traditional Craft by the Ministry of International Trade and Industry (now the Ministry of Economy, Trade and Industry).

== History ==
The origin of Mino washi can be traced to the Nara period in eighth century Japan, when the high quality paper was first made in Mino Province. Some of the original paper is still preserved in Shōsōin in the city of Nara in Nara Prefecture. During the Heian period, government officials were dispatched to the area when paper standards, such as size and color, were first established.

During the first part of the Kamakura period, Mino washi was relatively unused and unknown; however, because of activities during the Nanboku-chō period and the Ōnin War, the low-cost Mino washi came into more widespread use. Also, the Toki clan, who served as the shugo of Mino Province at the time, promoted industries and paper production as a way of strengthening the area and their power. Many members of the monk and kuge classes in Japan would visit the area and use the paper, bringing it back to their homelands, increasing the distribution of the paper. Eventually, merchants began to sell the paper throughout Japan, too.

During the Edo period, regulations were put in place regarding sales of the paper and the area further flourished as a special production area. As uses for the paper increased (including in shōji and other common uses), the amount of production increased and it became a well-known paper.

In 2014, this paper had been listed as intangible cultural heritage by UNESCO.

== Traditional craft of Gifu ==
Starting in the Edo period, the area surrounding Nagara Bridge in the city of Gifu became an important port to merchants traveling up and down the Nagara River. As a result, Mino washi and other goods that traveled from the upper-Mino region came ashore in the city and were sold in many tonya. Because of the high quality of the paper, it was used in many of the traditional crafts within the city, including lanterns (岐阜提灯 Gifu Chōchin), umbrellas (岐阜和傘 Gifu Wagasa) and fans (岐阜うちわ Gifu Uchiwa). Mino washi has become essential to the creation of these traditional crafts. The tonya in the Kawara-machi area of the city managed to survive the Gifu air raid during World War II, so the tradition continues today much as it has for hundreds of years.

== See also ==
- Ise washi from Ise, Mie
