= Ōzeki station =

Ōzeki Station is the name of two train stations in Japan:

- Ōzeki Station (Fukui) (大関駅)
- Ōzeki Station (Fukuoka) (大堰駅)
