= Ōzeki Masutoshi =

Viscount Ōzeki Masutoshi
- 大関増勤
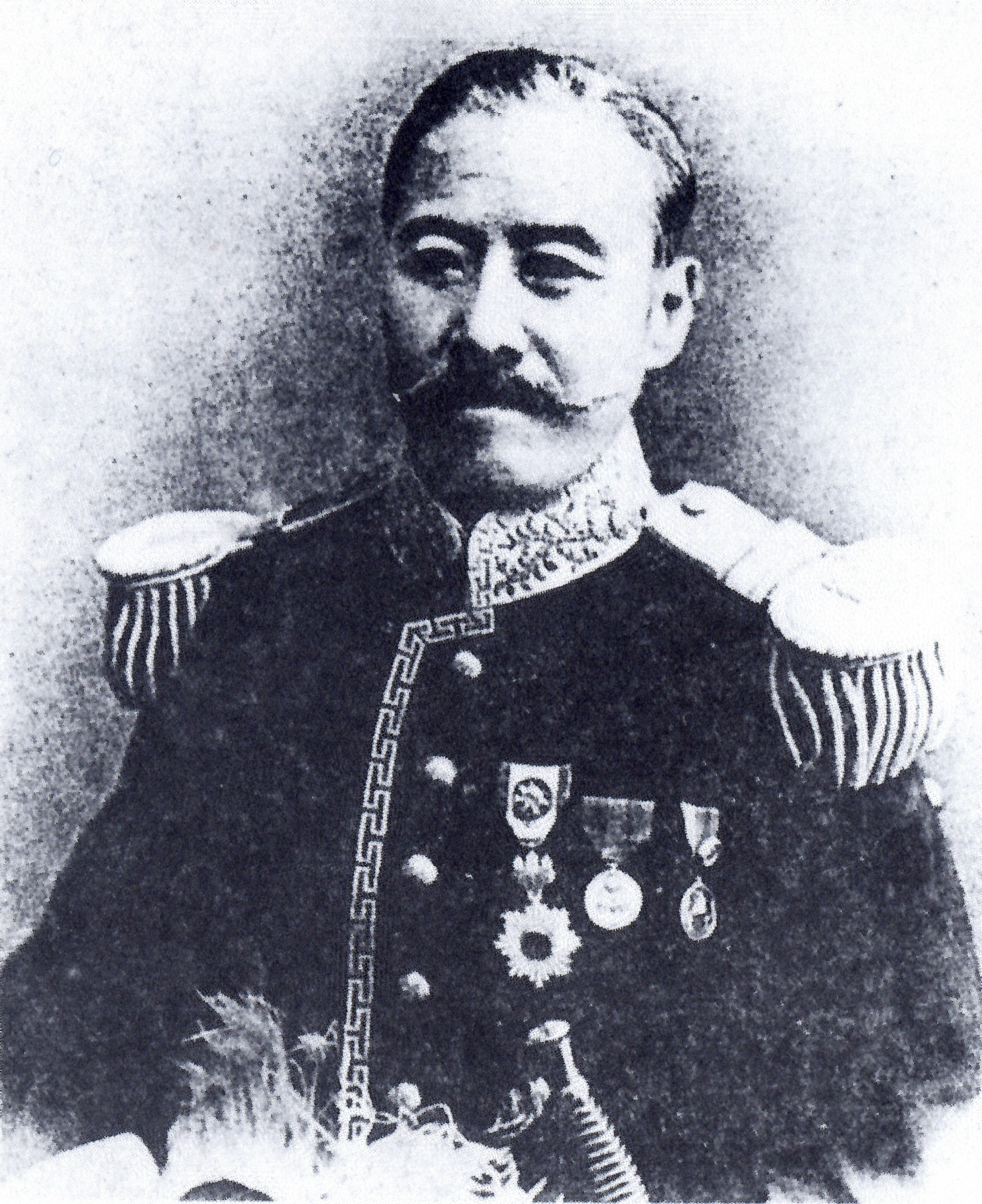
- Ōzeki Masunori

16th Daimyō of Kurobane Domain
- In office 1868–1869
- Monarch: Shōgun: Tokugawa Yoshinobu
- Preceded by: Ōzeki Masahiro
- Succeeded by: < position abolished >

Imperial Governor of Kurobane
- In office 1869–1871
- Monarch: Emperor Meiji

Personal details
- Born: January 28, 1849
- Died: August 9, 1905 (aged 56); Tokyo, Japan
- Spouse: daughter of Nabeshima Naotomo
- Domestic partner: daughter of Ikoma Chikayuki
- Parent: Tani Morishige (father)

Viscount Ōzeki Masutoshi (大関 増勤, January 28, 1849 – August 9, 1905) was the 16th (and final) daimyō of Kurobane Domain in Shimotsuke Province, Japan (modern-day Tochigi Prefecture) under the Bakumatsu period Tokugawa shogunate. His courtesy title was Mimasaka-no-kami, and his Court rank was Junior Fifth Rank, Lower Grade, later raised to Upper Third Rank.

== Biography ==
Ōzeki Masutoshi was the son of Tani Morishige, the daimyō of Yamaga Domain in Tanba Province, although some accounts state that he was the third son of Matsudaira Yorihisa of Hitachi-Fuchū Domain. In any event, he was posthumously adopted in 1868 to succeed Ōzeki Masuhiro, the 15th daimyō of Kurobane who had died without heir. In the Boshin War, he immediate pledged fealty to the new Meiji government and was awarded with reconfirmation in his holdings of 15,000 koku. In 1869 he was appointed imperial governor of Kurobane. With the abolition of the han system in July 1871, he retired and relocated to Tokyo. In February 1872, he went to the United States for studies, returning to Japan the following year.

With the establishment of the kazoku peerage system he was awarded with the title of shishaku (viscount) in 1884. In 1885, he was awarded the Order of the Rising Sun, 4th class. He was awarded the Order of the Sacred Treasures, 3rd class on his death in 1905.

== See also ==
- Kurobane Domain
